= 2025 Japanese gubernatorial elections =

10 gubernatorial elections were held in Japan in 2025.

== Background ==
The Japanese political process has two types of elections.

- National elections (国政選挙, kokusei senkyo)
- Subnational/local elections (地方選挙, chihō senkyo)

While the national level features a parliamentary system of government where the head of government is elected indirectly by the legislature, prefectures and municipalities employ a presidential system where chief executives and legislative assemblies are directly elected, independently from each other. Many of the prefectural and municipal elections are held together in unified local elections (統一地方選挙, Tōitsu chihō senkyo) since 1947, held in years before leap years; but since each election cycle of every chief executive or assembly of any prefecture or municipality is independent and not reset after resignations/deaths/recalls/no-confidence votes/dissolutions/municipal mergers, there are also many non-unified local elections today. Prefectural and municipal assemblies are unicameral, the National Diet is bicameral, with the two houses on independent election cycles.

== Yamagata Prefecture ==
The 2025 Yamagata gubernatorial election was held on January 26, 2025. It was won by the incumbent Mieko Yoshimura.

Date	Before election		After election	
Date	Governor	Party	Governor	Party
January 26, 2025	Mieko Yoshimura	Independent	Mieko Yoshimura	Independent

Candidates	Party	Votes	%
Mieko Yoshimura (Incumbent)	Independent	318,364	94.7%
Jun Nakayama	Independent	17,794	5.3%

Number of Registered Voters	Voter Turnout	
Number of Registered Voters	%	±
864,892	39.67	▼ -23.27

== Gifu Prefecture ==
The 2025 Gifu gubernatorial election was held on January 26, 2025. It was won by Yoshihide Esaki.

Date	Before election		After election	
Date	Governor	Party	Governor	Party
January 26, 2025	Hajime Furuta	Independent	Yoshihide Esaki	Independent

Candidates	Party	Votes	%
Yoshihide Esaki	Independent	436,418	76.3%
Wada Reiko	Independent	135,224	23.7%

Number of Registered Voters	Voter Turnout	
Number of Registered Voters	%	±
1,601,505	36.21	▼ -11.83

== Chiba Prefecture ==
The 2025 Chiba gubernatorial election was held on March 16, 2025. It was won by the incumbent Toshihito Kumagai.

Date	Before election		After election	
Date	Governor	Party	Governor	Party
March 16, 2025	Toshihito Kumagai	Independent	Toshihito Kumagai	Independent

Candidates	Party	Votes	%
Toshihito Kumagai (Incumbent)	Independent	1,404,905	85.9%
Masayuki Ogura	Independent	140,435	8.6%
Takashi Tachibana	Anti-NHK	79,060	4.8%
Atsuhiko Kurokawa	Tsubasa	10,948	0.7%

Number of Registered Voters	Voter Turnout	
Number of Registered Voters	%	±
5,186,664	31.93	▼ -7.06

== Fukuoka Prefecture ==
The 2025 Fukuoka gubernatorial election was held on March 23, 2025. It was won by the incumbent Seitaro Hattori.

Date	Before election		After election	
Date	Governor	Party	Governor	Party
March 23, 2025	Seitaro Hattori	Independent	Seitaro Hattori	Independent

Candidates	Party	Votes	%
Seitaro Hattori (Incumbent)	Independent	1,036,280	79.7%
Koichiro Yoshida	Independent	209,416	16.1%
Nobuo Shindo	Independent	27,952	2.1%
Takahiro Fujimaru	Okane o Min'na e Shin Dokuritsu-Tō	27,394	2.1%

Number of Registered Voters	Voter Turnout	
Number of Registered Voters	%	±
4,169,693	31.93	▲1.97

== Akita Prefecture ==
The 2025 Akita gubernatorial election was held on April 6, 2025. It was won by the newcomer Kenta Suzuki.

Date	Before election		After election	
Date	Governor	Party	Governor	Party
April 6, 2025	Norihisa Satake	Independent	Kenta Suzuki	Independent

Candidates	Party	Votes	%
Kenta Suzuki	Independent	273,270	58.4%
Kazuzo Saruta	Independent	189,382	40.5%
Norio Okubo	Independent	5,345	1.1%

Number of Registered Voters	Voter Turnout	
Number of Registered Voters	%	±
789,908	59.59	▲3.03

== Wakayama Prefecture ==
Following the death of then governor Shūhei Kishimoto on April 15, the 2025 Wakayama gubernatorial special election was held on June 1, 2025. It was won by incumbent acting governor Izumi Miyazaki. (Note: Miyazaki only serves as the acting governor following the death of Shūhei Kishimoto)

Date	Before election		After election	
Date	Governor	Party	Governor	Party
June 1, 2025	Izumi Miyazaki	Independent	Izumi Miyazaki	Independent

Candidates	Party	Votes	%
Izumi Miyazaki (incumbent)	Independent	250,454	84.1%
Michiko Matsuzaka	JCP	47,215	15.9%

Number of Registered Voters	Voter Turnout	
Number of Registered Voters	%	±
759,006	39.86	0.00

== Mie Prefecture ==
The 2025 Mie gubernatorial special election was held on September 7, 2025. It was won by the incumbent governor Katsuyuki Ichimi.

Date	Before election		After election	
Date	Governor	Party	Governor	Party
September 7, 2025	Katsuyuki Ichimi	Independent	Katsuyuki Ichimi	Independent

Candidates	Party	Votes	%
Katsuyuki Ichimi (incumbent)	Independent	366,887	65.5%
Masashi Ito	Independent	164,504	29.4%
Tsuyoshi Ishikawa	Independent	28,429	5.1%

Number of Registered Voters	Voter Turnout	
Number of Registered Voters	%	±
1,422,251	39.77	▲1.79

== Ibaraki Prefecture ==
The 2025 Ibaraki gubernatorial election was held on September 7, 2025. It was won by the incumbent governor Kazuhiko Ōigawa.

Date	Before election		After election	
Date	Governor	Party	Governor	Party
September 7, 2025	Kazuhiko Ōigawa	Independent	Kazuhiko Ōigawa	Independent

Candidates	Party	Votes	%
Kazuhiko Ōigawa (incumbent)	Independent	447,833	58.3%
Shigehiro Tanaka	Independent	162,216	21.1%
Masahiko Uchida	Independent	158,585	20.6%

Number of Registered Voters	Voter Turnout	
Number of Registered Voters	%	±
2,342,787	33.52	▼ -1.50

== Miyagi Prefecture ==
The 2025 Miyagi gubernatorial election was held on October 26, 2025. It was won by the incumbent governor Yoshihiro Murai.

Date	Before election		After election	
Date	Governor	Party	Governor	Party
October 26, 2025	Yoshihiro Murai	Independent	Yoshihiro Murai	Independent

Candidates	Party	Votes	%
Yoshihiro Murai (incumbent)	Independent	340,190	39.3%
Masamune Wada	Independent	324,375	37.5%
Miyuki Yusa	Independent	176,287	20.4%
Nobuto Ito	Independent	20,445	2.4%
Jun Kanayama	Independent	3,663	0.4%

Number of Registered Voters	Voter Turnout	
Number of Registered Voters	%	±
1,872,116	46.50	▼ -9.79

== Hiroshima Prefecture ==
The 2025 Hiroshima gubernatorial election was held on November 9, 2025. It was won by the newcomer Mika Yokota.

Date	Before election		After election	
Date	Governor	Party	Governor	Party
November 9, 2025	Hidehiko Yuzaki	Independent	Mika Yokota	Independent

Candidates	Party	Votes	%
Mika Yokota	Independent	552,614	83.4%
Mayumi Inohara	Independent	75,468	11.4%
Hiroshi Oyama	Independent	34,333	5.2%

Number of Registered Voters	Voter Turnout	
Number of Registered Voters	%	±
1,872,116	46.50	▼ -9.79

== See also ==
- 2025 in Japan
- Other elections in Japan in 2025
  - 2025 Japanese House of Councillors election
  - 2025 Tokyo prefectural election
  - 2025 Saitama mayoral election
