= List of current Japanese governors =

The governor is the highest ranking executive of a prefecture in Japan.

Prefecture	Picture	Current governor	Former party	Term	Took office	Office expires
Aichi (list)		Hideaki Omura	Independent (Note: First elected with the support of Genzei Nippon and NKP.)	4th	February 15, 2011	February 11, 2027
Akita (list)		Kenta Suzuki	Independent	1st	April 20, 2025	April 19, 2029
Aomori (list)		Sōichirō Miyashita	Independent	1st	June 29, 2023	June 28, 2027
Chiba		Toshihito Kumagai	Independent (Note: First elected with the support of CDP, DPFP, JIP, SDP as well as partial support from LDP representatives.)	2nd	April 5, 2021	April 4, 2029
Ehime		Tokihiro Nakamura	Independent (Note: First elected with the support of DPJ, LDP and NKP.)	4th	December 1, 2010	November 29, 2026
Fukui		Takato Ishida	Independent	1st	January 28, 2026	January 24, 2030
Fukuoka		Seitaro Hattori	Independent (Note: First elected with the support of CDP, DPFP, LDP, NKP and SDP.)	2nd	April 14, 2021	April 10, 2029
Fukushima		Masao Uchibori	Independent (Note: First elected with the support of DPJ, LDP, NKP and SDP.)	3rd	November 12, 2014	November 10, 2026
Gifu		Yoshihide Esaki	Independent (Note: First elected with the support of CDP, DPFP, LDP and NKP.)	1st	February 6, 2025	February 5, 2029
Gunma		Ichita Yamamoto	Independent (Note: First elected with the support of LDP and NKP.)	2nd	July 28, 2019	July 27, 2027
Hiroshima (list)		Mika Yokota	Independent	1st	November 29, 2025	November 28, 2029
Hokkaidō (list)		Naomichi Suzuki	Independent	2nd	April 23, 2019	April 21, 2027
Hyōgo		Motohiko Saitō	Independent (Note: First elected with the support of LDP and JIP.)	2nd	August 1, 2021	November 16, 2028
Ibaraki (list)		Kazuhiko Ōigawa	Independent	3rd	September 26, 2017	September 25, 2029
Ishikawa (list)		Yukiyoshi Yamano	Independent	1st	March 27, 2026	March 26, 2030
Iwate		Takuya Tasso	Independent (Note: First elected with the support of DPJ.)	4th	April 30, 2007	September 10, 2027
Kagawa		Toyohito Ikeda	Independent	1st	September 5, 2022	September 4, 2026
Kagoshima		Kōichi Shiota	Independent (Note: First elected without the support of political parties.)	2nd	July 28, 2020	July 27, 2028
Kanagawa (list)		Yūji Kuroiwa	Independent	4th	April 23, 2011	April 19, 2027
Kōchi		Seiji Hamada	Independent	2nd	December 7, 2019	December 6, 2027
Kumamoto (list)		Takashi Kimura	Independent	1st	April 16, 2024	April 15, 2028
Kyoto (list)		Takatoshi Nishiwaki	Independent (Note: First elected with the support of CDP, DP, Kibō no Tō, LDP, NKP and SDP.)	3rd	April 16, 2018	April 14, 2030
Mie		Katsuyuki Ichimi	Independent	2nd	September 14, 2021	September 11, 2029
Miyagi (list)		Yoshihiro Murai	LDP (Note: First elected with the support of LDP.)	6th	November 21, 2005	November 20, 2029
Miyazaki		Shunji Kōno	Independent	4th	January 21, 2011	January 17, 2027
Nagano (list)		Shuichi Abe	Independent (Note: First elected with the support of DPJ, PNP and SDP.)	5th	September 1, 2010	August 31, 2030
Nagasaki		Ken Hirata	Independent (Note: First elected with support of LDP, CDP and {CDP.)	1st	March 2, 2026	March 1, 2030
Nara		Makoto Yamashita	JIP	1st	May 2, 2023	May 1, 2027
Niigata (list)		Hideyo Hanazumi	Independent	3rd	June 10, 2018	June 9, 2030
Ōita		Kiichiro Satō	Independent	1st	April 28, 2023	April 27, 2027
Okayama (list)		Ryūta Ibaragi	Independent (Note: First elected with the support of LDP, NKP and SP.)	4th	November 12, 2012	November 11, 2028
Okinawa (list)		Genta Koja	Independent	1st	September 30, 2026	September 29, 2030
Ōsaka (list)		Hirofumi Yoshimura	JIP	2nd	April 4, 2019	April 2, 2027
Saga (list)		Yoshinori Yamaguchi	Independent	3rd	January 14, 2015	January 9, 2027
Saitama (list)		Motohiro Ōno	DPP (Note: First elected with the support of CDP, DPP, JCP and SDP.)	2nd	August 31, 2019	August 30, 2027
Shiga (list)		Taizō Mikazuki	Independent	4th	July 20, 2014	July 19, 2030
Shimane		Tatsuya Maruyama	Independent	2nd	April 30, 2019	April 28, 2027
Shizuoka		Yasutomo Suzuki	Independent (Note: First elected with the support of CDP and DPP.)	1st	May 26, 2024	May 25, 2028
Tochigi		Tomikazu Fukuda	Independent	6th	December 9, 2004	December 8, 2028
Tokushima		Masazumi Gotoda	LDP	1st	May 18, 2023	May 17, 2027
Tokyo (list)		Yuriko Koike	Independent	3rd	August 2, 2016	July 30, 2028
Tottori		Shinji Hirai	Independent	5th	April 13, 2007	April 8, 2027
Toyama		Hachiro Nitta	Independent (Note: First elected with partial support of LDP and JIP.)	2nd	November 9, 2020	November 8, 2028
Wakayama		Izumi Miyazaki	Independent	1st	June 3, 2025	May 31, 2029
Yamagata		Mieko Yoshimura	Independent (Note: First elected with the support of DPJ, JCP and SDP.)	5th	February 14, 2009	February 13, 2029
Yamaguchi		Tsugumasa Muraoka	Independent	4th	February 25, 2014	February 22, 2030
Yamanashi		Kotaro Nagasaki	LDP	2nd	February 17, 2019	February 16, 2027

== See also ==
- Lists of governors of prefectures of Japan
