= Masaru Hashimoto =

Japanese politician (born 1945)

- 橋本 昌
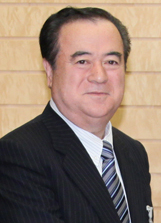
- Hashimoto in 2011

Governor of Ibaraki Prefecture
- In office 26 September 1993 – 25 September 2017
- Monarch: Akihito
- Preceded by: Fujio Takeuchi
- Succeeded by: Kazuhiko Ōigawa

Personal details
- Born: 19 November 1945 (age 80) Tōkai, Ibaraki, Japan
- Party: Independent
- Education: University of Tokyo

Masaru Hashimoto (橋本 昌, Hashimoto Masaru; born 19 November 1945) is a Japanese politician who was the governor of Ibaraki Prefecture from 1993 to 2017.

== Life ==
Masaru Hashimoto was born on 19 November 1945 in Tōkai, Ibaraki Prefecture.

He is a graduate of the University of Tokyo, and joined the Ministry of Home Affairs in 1969.
