= Norihisa =

- Gender: Male

Origin
- Origin: Japanese
- Meaning: Different meanings depending on the kanji used

Norihisa (written: 敬久, 範久 or 憲久) is a masculine Japanese given name. Notable people with the name include:

- Norihisa Satake (佐竹 敬久; born 1947), Japanese politician
- Norihisa Shimizu (清水 範久; born 1976), Japanese footballer
- Norihisa Tamura (田村 憲久; born 1964), Japanese politician
