= Kimimachizaka Prefectural Natural Park =

Natural park in Akita prefecture, Japan

- きみまち阪県立自然公園
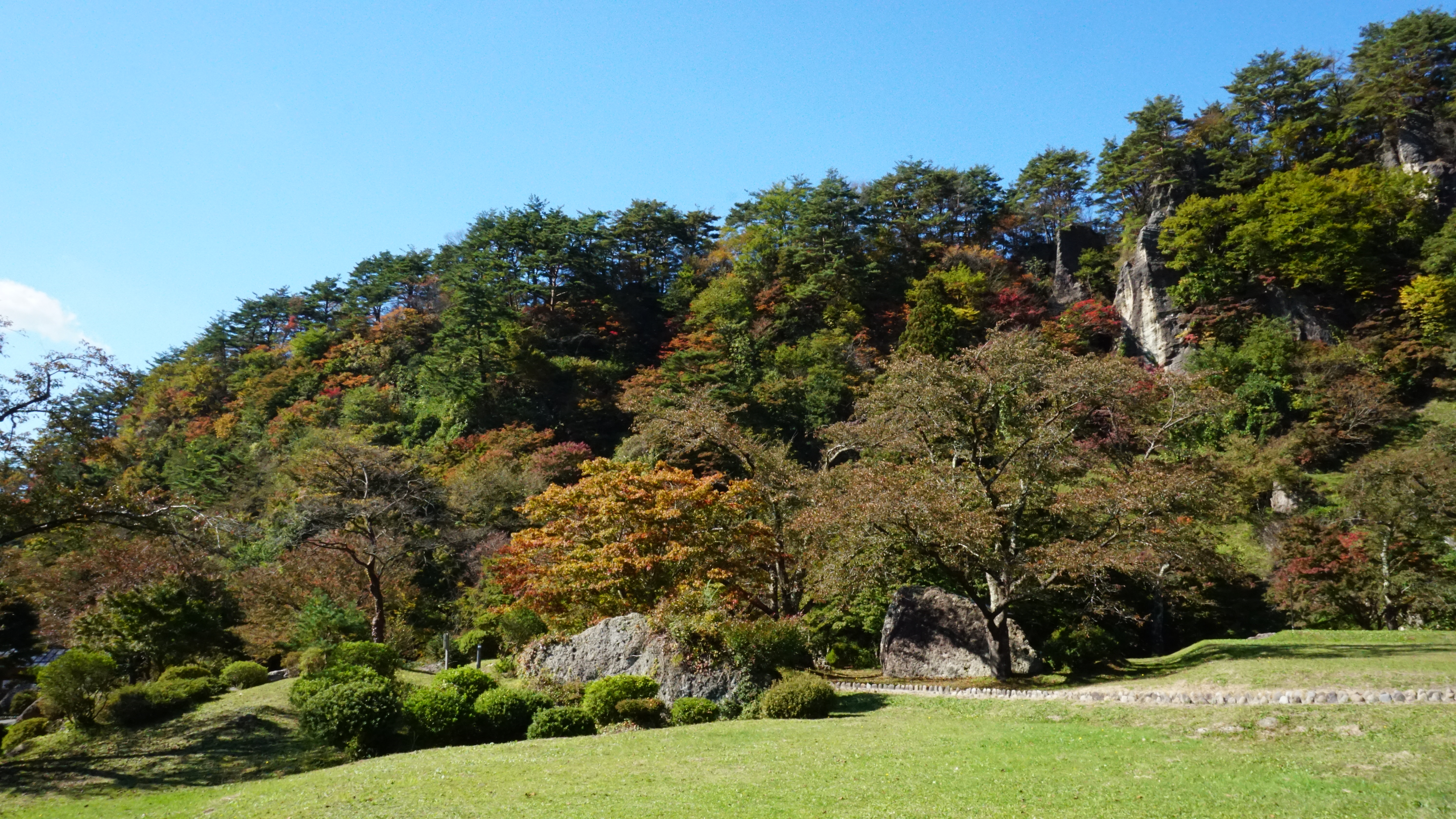
- Kimimachizaka
- Interactive map of Kimimachizaka Prefectural Natural Park
- Location: Akita Prefecture, Japan
- Coordinates: 40°13′N 140°16′E
- Area: 5.99 km^{2} (2.31 sq mi)
- Established: 16 July 1964

Kimimachizaka Prefectural Natural Park (きみまち阪県立自然公園, Kimimachizaka kenritsu shizen kōen) is a Prefectural Natural Park in Akita Prefecture, Japan. Established in 1964, the park spans the borders of the municipalities of Fujisato and Noshiro, and takes its name from Kimimachizaka (きみまち阪).

== See also ==
- National Parks of Japan
- Parks and gardens in Akita Prefecture
