= Moriyoshizan Prefectural Natural Park =

Natural park of Akita prefecture, Japan

- 森吉山県立自然公園
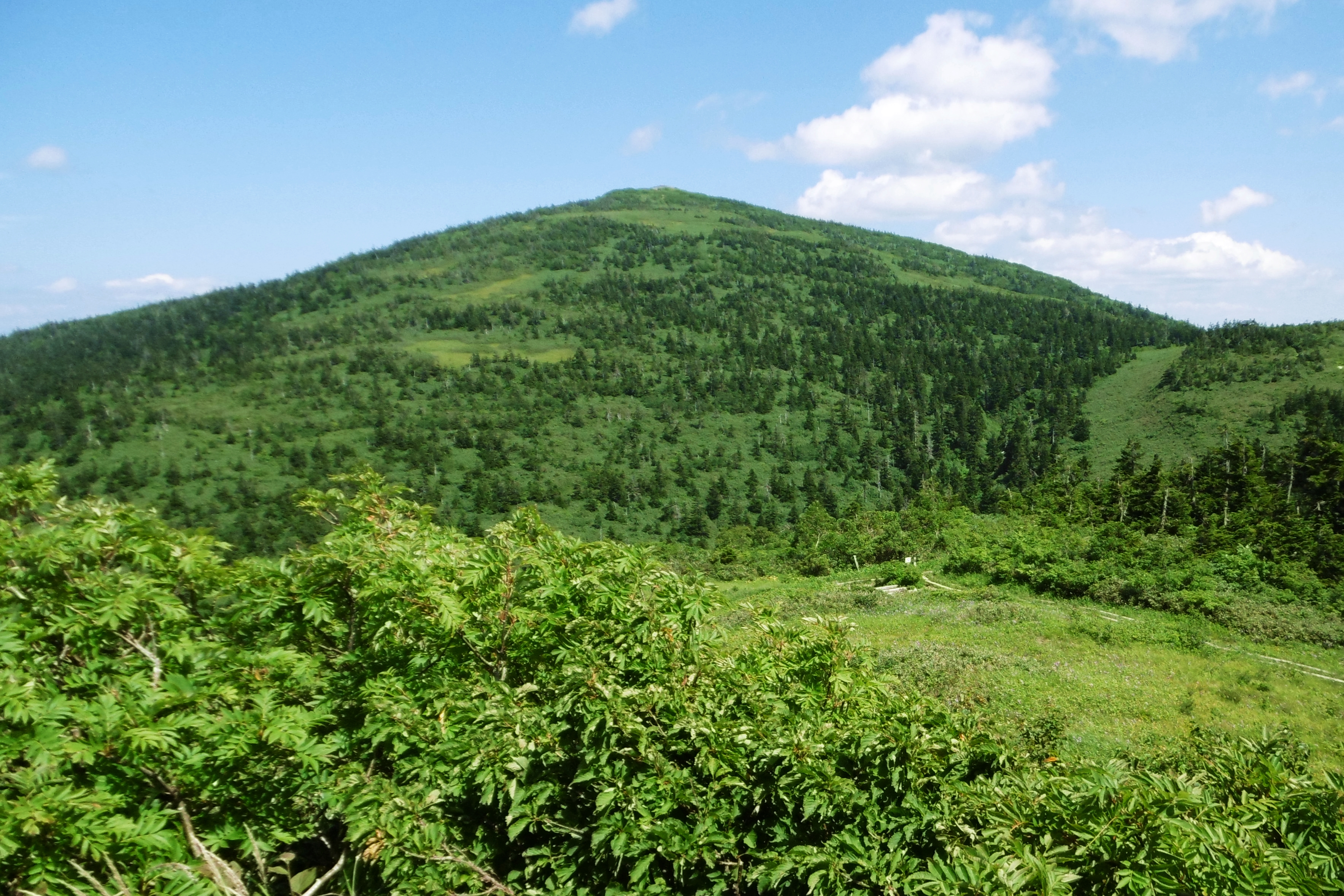
- Mount Moriyoshi
- Interactive map of Moriyoshizan Prefectural Natural Park
- Location: Akita Prefecture, Japan
- Nearest city: Kitaakita
- Coordinates: 39°59′N 140°32′E
- Area: 152.14 km^{2} (58.74 sq mi)
- Established: 1 October 1968

Moriyoshizan Prefectural Natural Park (森吉山県立自然公園, Moriyoshizan kenritsu shizen kōen) is a Prefectural Natural Park in Akita Prefecture, Japan. Established in 1968, the park lies within the municipality of Kitaakita, and takes its name from Mount Moriyoshi (森吉山).

== See also ==
- National Parks of Japan
- Parks and gardens in Akita Prefecture
