= Hachimori Iwadate Prefectural Natural Park =

Natural park of Akita prefecture, Japan

- 八森岩館県立自然公園
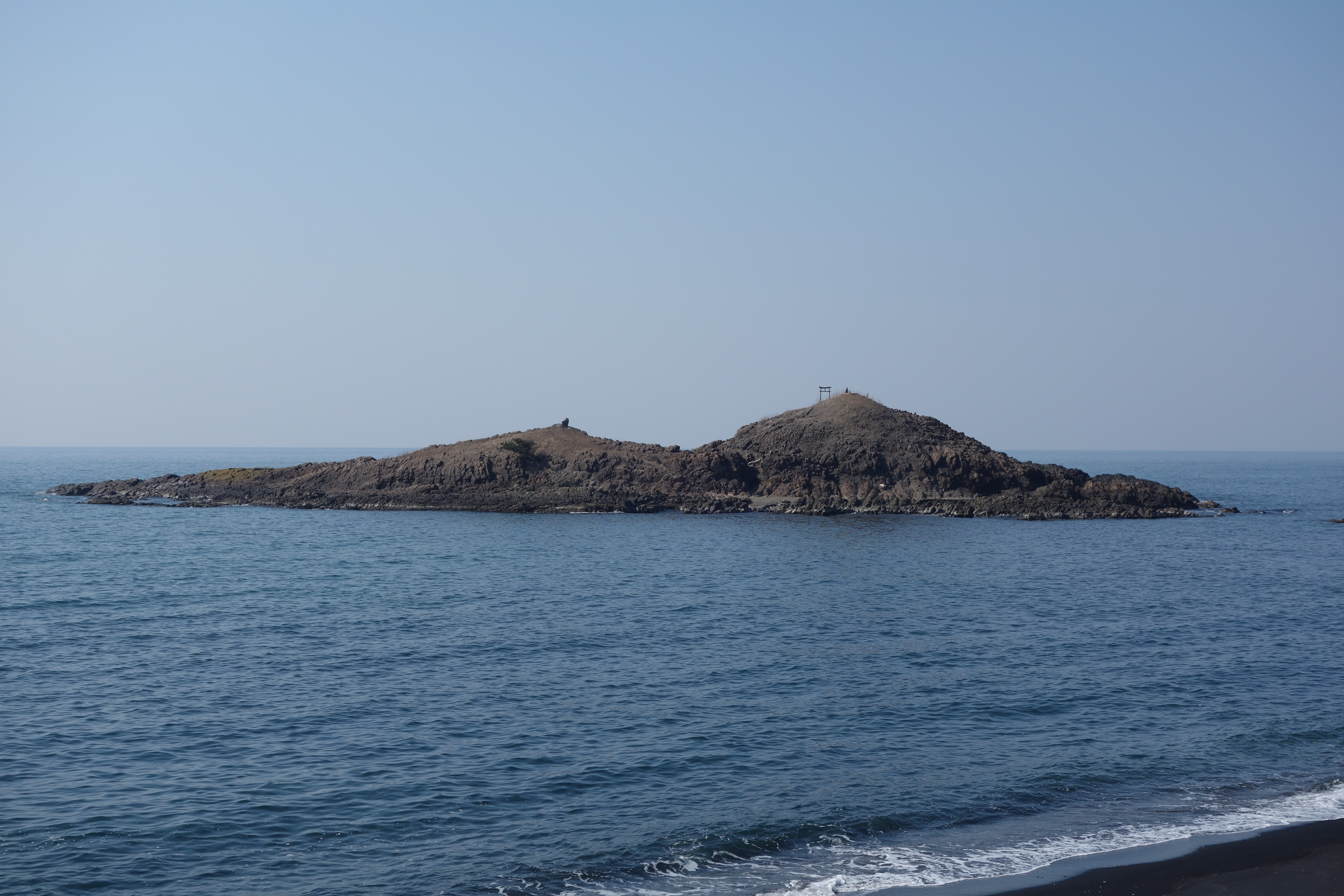
- Oshima
- Interactive map of Hachimori Iwadate Prefectural Natural Park
- Location: Akita Prefecture, Japan
- Coordinates: 40°22′N 140°01′E
- Area: 21.79 km^{2} (8.41 sq mi)
- Established: 16 July 1964

Hachimori Iwadate Prefectural Natural Park (八森岩館県立自然公園, Hachimori Iwadate kenritsu shizen kōen) is a Prefectural Natural Park in Akita Prefecture, Japan. Established in 1964, the park lies within the municipality of Happō (formerly within Hachimori).

== See also ==
- National Parks of Japan
- Parks and gardens in Akita Prefecture
