= Hidehiko Yuzaki =

Governor of Hiroshima Prefecture in Japan

- 湯崎 英彦

Governor of Hiroshima Prefecture
- In office 29 November 2009 – 28 November 2025
- Monarchs: Akihito; Naruhito
- Preceded by: Yūzan Fujita
- Succeeded by: Mika Yokota

Personal details
- Born: 4 October 1965 (age 61) Saeki-ku, Hiroshima, Japan
- Party: Liberal Democratic
- Education: University of Tokyo (LLB); Stanford University (MBA)

Hidehiko Yuzaki (湯崎 英彦, Yuzaki Hidehiko; born 4 October 1965) is a Japanese politician and former governor of Hiroshima Prefecture in Japan.

== Early life and education ==
Yuzaki was born 4 October 1965, in Saeki-ku, Hiroshima. He received his B.L. degree from the University of Tokyo in 1990 and his M.B.A. from the Stanford University School of Business in 1995. Yuzaki's paid job was as a part-time teacher at an after-school program to help students pass their admissions exams.

== Political career ==
Yuzaki served in the Ministry of International Trade and Industry before running for governor of the Hiroshima Prefecture. He was elected governor of the Hiroshima Prefecture on 8 November 2009, as the candidate of the member of the Liberal Democratic Party of Japan (LDP). Yuzaki has identified cultivating a culture of entrepreneurship in Hiroshima as a top priority in his political career.

As governor of Hiroshima, he tried to forge new initiatives in the field of nuclear disarmament. On 4 November 2011, he announced a new plan to formulate a road map for nuclear abolition through the cooperation of former government officials. The project is titled Hiroshima for Global Peace. In the same month, he visited Washington, D.C., and met US National Security Council member Laura Holgate in order to enlist the cooperation of the US government.

In the 2021 Liberal Democratic Party leadership election, Yuzaki endorsed the campaign of Fumio Kishida.

== Other activities ==
He is a member of the International Advisory Board at the Blavatnik School of Government at the University of Oxford. Yuzaki is a fan of American barbecue cuisine, which he states is a product of his education at Stanford.

Preceded by Yūzan Fujita	Governor of Hiroshima Prefecture; 2009–2025	Succeeded by Mika Yokota
