= Tashirodake Prefectural Natural Park =

Natural park of Akita prefecture, Japan

- 田代岳県立自然公園
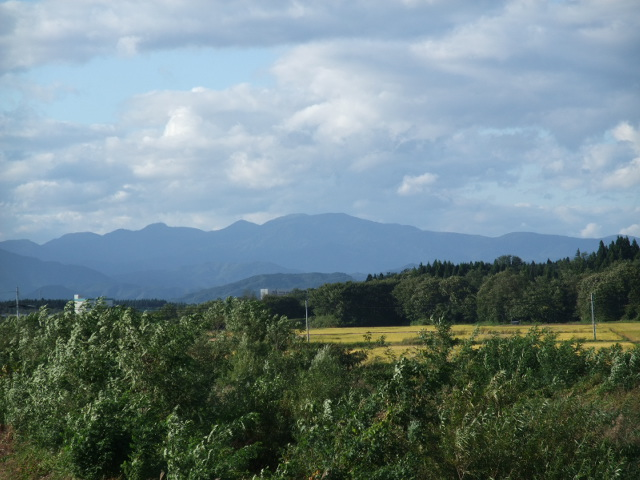
- Mount Tashiro
- Interactive map of Tashirodake Prefectural Natural Park
- Location: Akita Prefecture, Japan
- Nearest city: Ōdate
- Coordinates: 40°26′N 140°25′E
- Area: 18.55 km^{2} (7.16 sq mi)
- Established: 11 January 1975

Tashirodake Prefectural Natural Park (田代岳県立自然公園, Tashirodake kenritsu shizen kōen) is a Prefectural Natural Park in Akita Prefecture, Japan. Established in 1975, the park lies within the municipality of Ōdate, and takes its name from Mount Tashiro (田代岳).

== See also ==
- National Parks of Japan
- Parks and gardens in Akita Prefecture
