= Taiheizan Prefectural Natural Park (Akita) =

Park in Japan

- 太平山県立自然公園
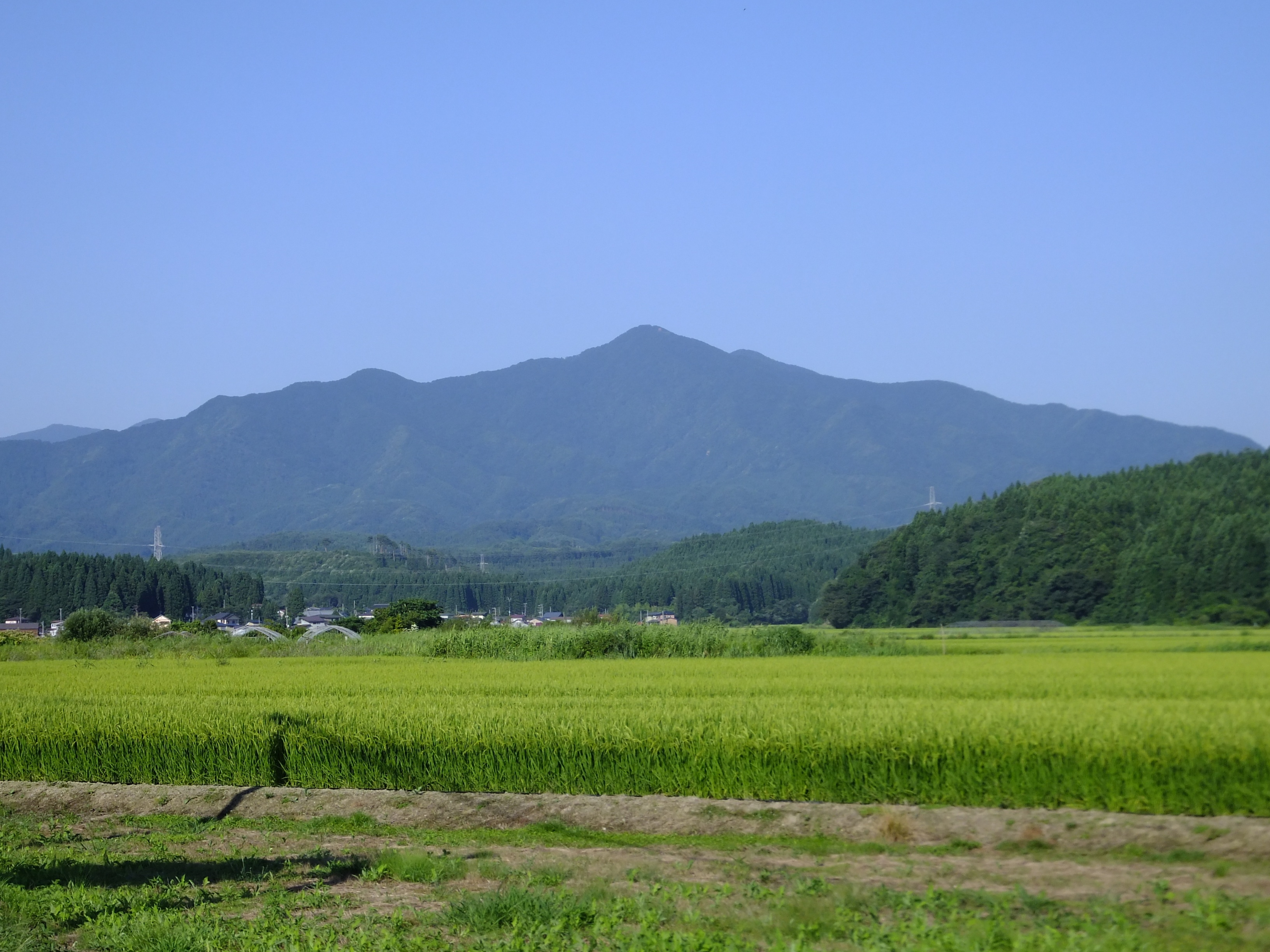
- Mount Taihei
- Interactive map of Taiheizan Prefectural Natural Park
- Location: Akita Prefecture, Japan
- Coordinates: 39°47′N 140°19′E
- Area: 118.97 km^{2} (45.93 sq mi)
- Established: 15 July 1972

Taiheizan Prefectural Natural Park (太平山県立自然公園, Taiheizan kenritsu shizen kōen) is a Prefectural Natural Park in Akita Prefecture, Japan. Established in 1972, the park spans the borders of the municipalities of Akita, Gojōme, and Kamikoani, and takes its name from Mount Taihei (太平山).

== See also ==
- National Parks of Japan
- Parks and gardens in Akita Prefecture
