= Magi Mahiru Prefectural Natural Park =

Park in Japan

- 真木真昼県立自然公園
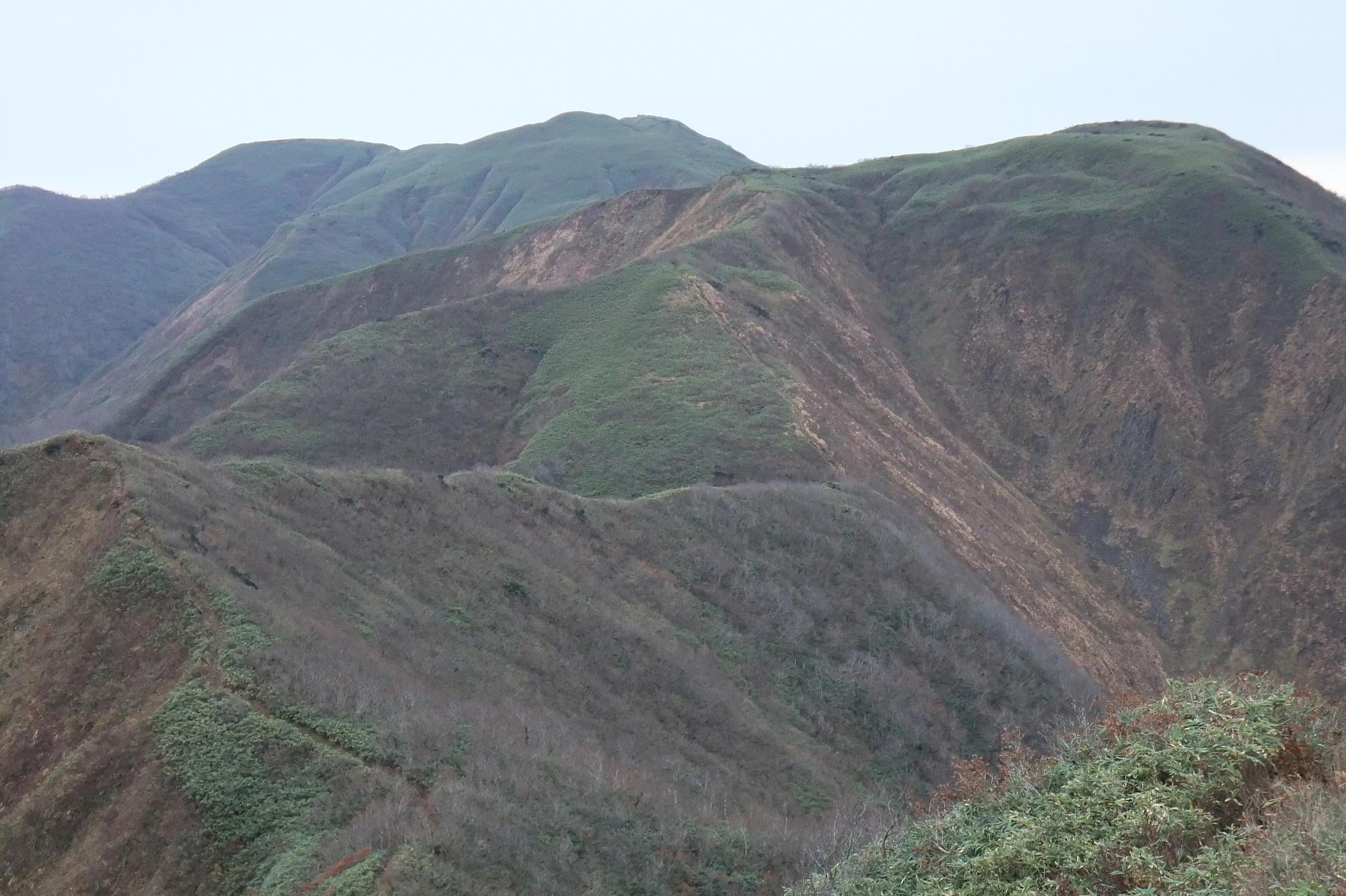
- Mount Mahiru
- Interactive map of Magi Mahiru Prefectural Natural Park
- Location: Akita Prefecture, Japan
- Coordinates: 39°32′15″N 140°41′24″E
- Area: 59.03 km^{2} (22.79 sq mi)
- Established: 11 January 1975

Magi Mahiru Prefectural Natural Park (真木真昼県立自然公園, Magi Mahiru kenritsu shizen kōen) is a Prefectural Natural Park in Akita Prefecture, Japan.

Established in 1975, the park spans the borders of the municipalities of Daisen and Misato and takes its name from two of its features, Mount Mahiru (真昼岳) and Magi Valley (真木渓谷).

== See also ==
- National Parks of Japan
- Parks and gardens in Akita Prefecture
