= Tazawako Dakigaeri Prefectural Natural Park =

Park in Japan

- 田沢湖抱返り県立自然公園
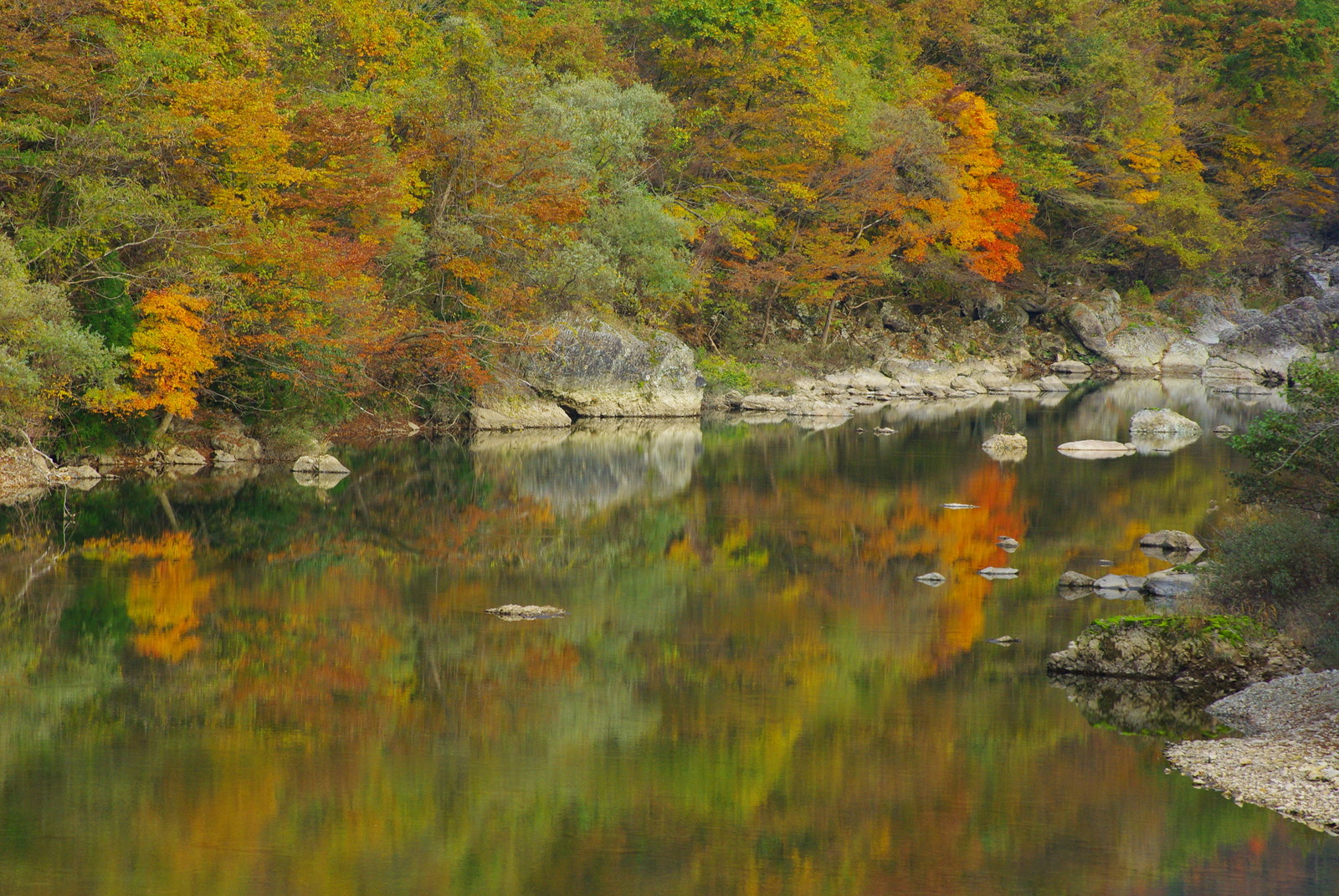
- Dakigaeri Gorge
- Interactive map of Tazawako Dakigaeri Prefectural Natural Park
- Location: Akita Prefecture, Japan
- Nearest city: Semboku
- Coordinates: 39°44′N 140°40′E
- Area: 74.77 km^{2} (28.87 sq mi)
- Established: 1 April 1960

Tazawako Dakigaeri Prefectural Natural Park (田沢湖抱返り県立自然公園, Tazawako Dakigaeri kenritsu shizen kōen) is a Prefectural Natural Park in Akita Prefecture, Japan. Established in 1960, the park lies within the municipality of Semboku, and takes its name from Lake Tazawa and Dakigaeri Gorge (抱返り渓谷).

== See also ==
- National Parks of Japan
- Parks and gardens in Akita Prefecture
