= Eikei Suzuki =

Japanese politician

- 鈴木 英敬
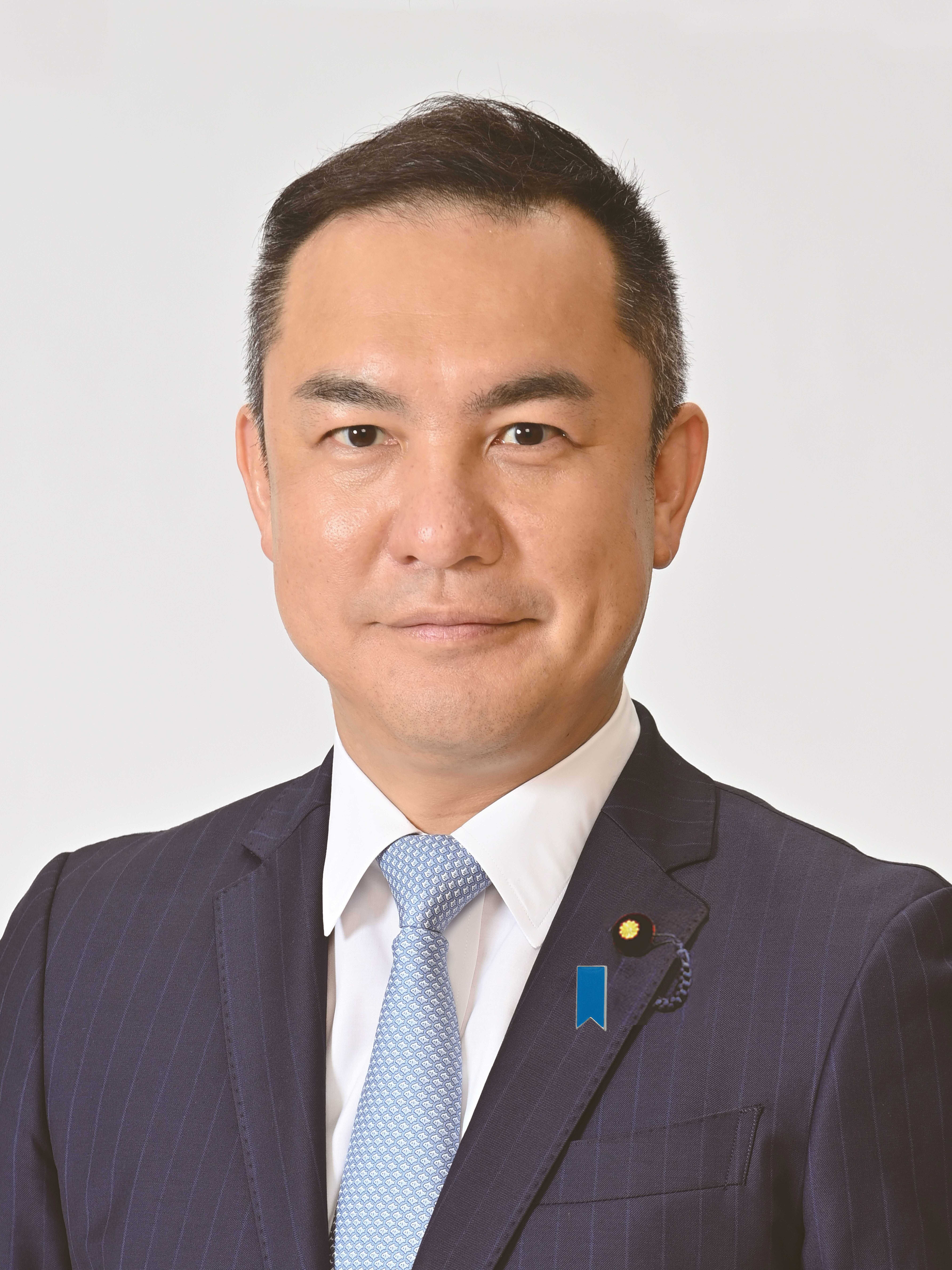
- Official portrait, 2021

Member of the House of Representatives
- Incumbent
- Assumed office 3 November 2021
- Preceded by: Norio Mitsuya
- Constituency: Mie 4th

Governor of Mie Prefecture
- In office 21 April 2011 – 12 September 2021
- Monarchs: Akihito; Naruhito
- Preceded by: Akihiko Noro
- Succeeded by: Katsuyuki Ichimi

Personal details
- Born: 15 August 1974 (age 52) Koshien, Hyōgo, Japan
- Party: Liberal Democratic (2008–2011; 2021–present)
- Other political affiliations: Independent (2011–2021)
- Education: University of Tokyo

Eikei Suzuki (鈴木 英敬, Suzuki Eikei; born 15 August 1974) is a Japanese politician and the former governor of Mie Prefecture located in Kansai region of Japan. Since 2021 he has been a Member of the House of Representatives, representing Mie's 4th district.
