= Hajime Furuta =

Governor of Gifu Prefecture in Japan

- 古田 肇

Governor of Gifu Prefecture
- In office 6 February 2005 – 5 February 2025
- Monarchs: Akihito; Naruhito
- Preceded by: Taku Kajiwara
- Succeeded by: Yoshihide Esaki

Personal details
- Born: 13 September 1947 (age 79) Gifu City, Gifu, Japan
- Party: Independent
- Education: University of Tokyo

Hajime Furuta (古田 肇, Furuta Hajime; born 13 September 1947) is a former governor of Gifu Prefecture in Japan. He held the office for five terms between 2005 and 2025. A native of Gifu City, he was chosen as the final torchbearer for the National Sports Festival when it was held in Gifu City while he was a senior at Gifu Prefectural Senior High School. He entered the Faculty of Law at the University of Tokyo and joined the Ministry of International Trade and Industry (MITI) in 1971.

== Career in National Government ==
During his time at MITI, he was sent to study at the École nationale d'administration in France. From 1994 to 1996, he served as the Executive Secretary to both Prime Ministers Tsutomu Hata and Tomiichi Murayama. Soon after he was appointed Director-General of the Economic Cooperation Department in the International Trade Bureau of MITI and later the Director-General for Commerce and Distribution Policy in the same ministry. In 2002, he was moved to the Ministry of Foreign Affairs to head the Economic Cooperation Bureau after the move was requested by then Foreign Minister Yoriko Kawaguchi and the Office of the Prime Minister. He was put in charge of various reform efforts within the ministry and was chiefly responsible for the Foreign Ministry updating and reforming Official Development Assistance (ODA). He left the ministry after he was elected in February 2005 to be the next governor of Gifu Prefecture, replacing Governor Taku Kajiwara, who had served for 16 years as governor.

== 2009 Election ==
With the support of both major political parties, the DPJ and LDP, as well as the New Komeito Party, Hajime defeated newcomer Kazuhiko Kinoshita on 25 January 2009. Kinoshita, the head of a local labor consultation center, was supported by the Japanese Communist Party.
