= Keiichi Tsuruoka =

Japanese mayor

- 鶴岡 啓一

Mayor of Chiba
- In office 1 July 2001 – 1 May 2009
- Preceded by: Asahi Matsui
- Succeeded by: Kenji Fujishiro (acting); Toshihito Kumagai

Personal details
- Born: 18 May 1940 (age 86) Chūō-ku, Chiba, Japan
- Party: Independent
- Education: University of Tokyo

Keiichi Tsuruoka (鶴岡 啓一, Tsuruoka Keiichi; born 18 May 1940 in Chiba City) is the former mayor of Chiba City in Japan, serving from his election in 2001 until his arrest and subsequent retirement in 2009 for corruption-related charges. He was an independent politician who had served in the Home Affairs Ministry after graduating from the University of Tokyo.
