= Akita Prefecture =

Prefecture of Japan

Coordinates: 39°43′7″N 140°6′9″E

Akita Prefecture 秋田県
- Prefecture

Japanese transcription(s)
  - Japanese: 秋田県
  - Rōmaji: Akita-ken
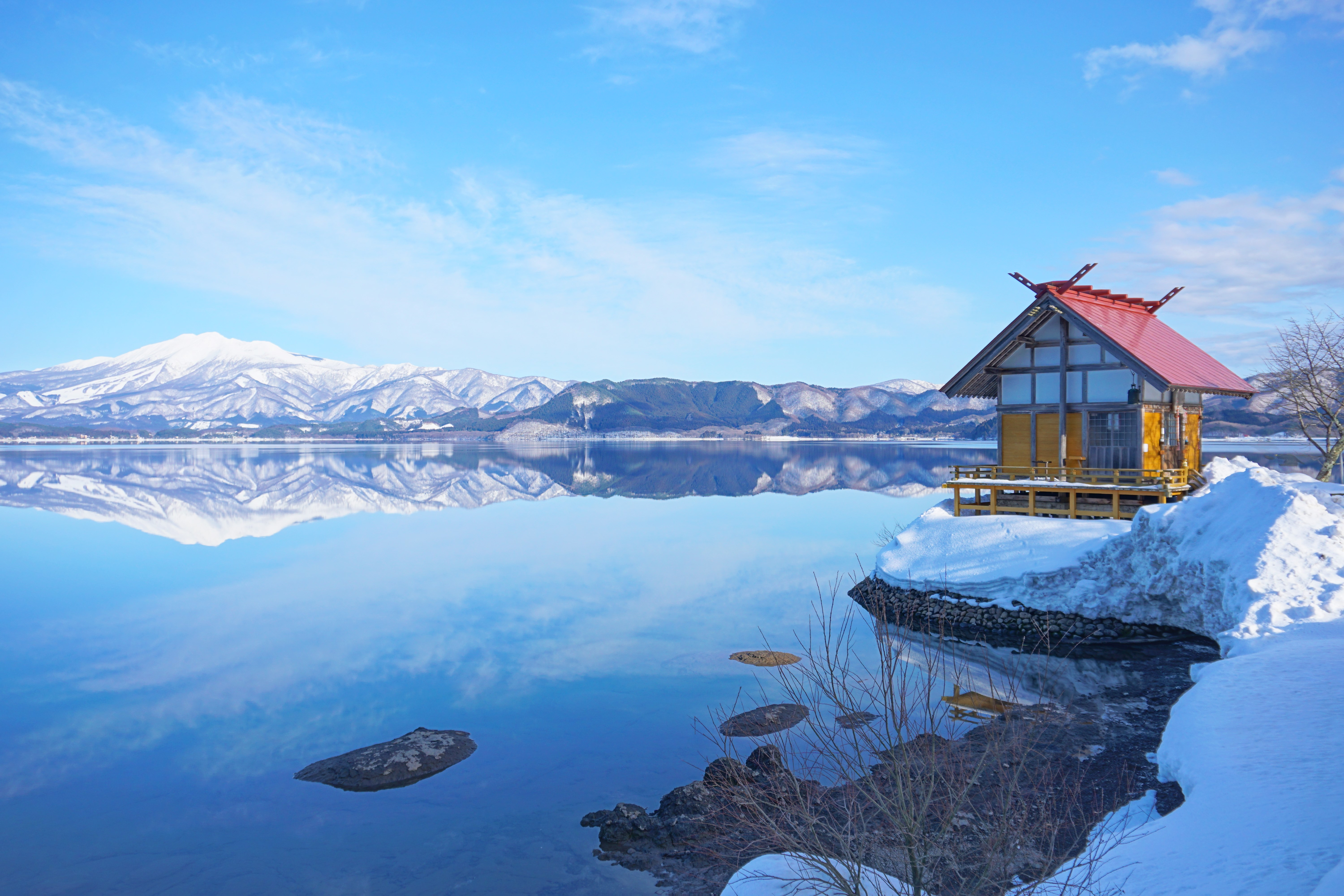
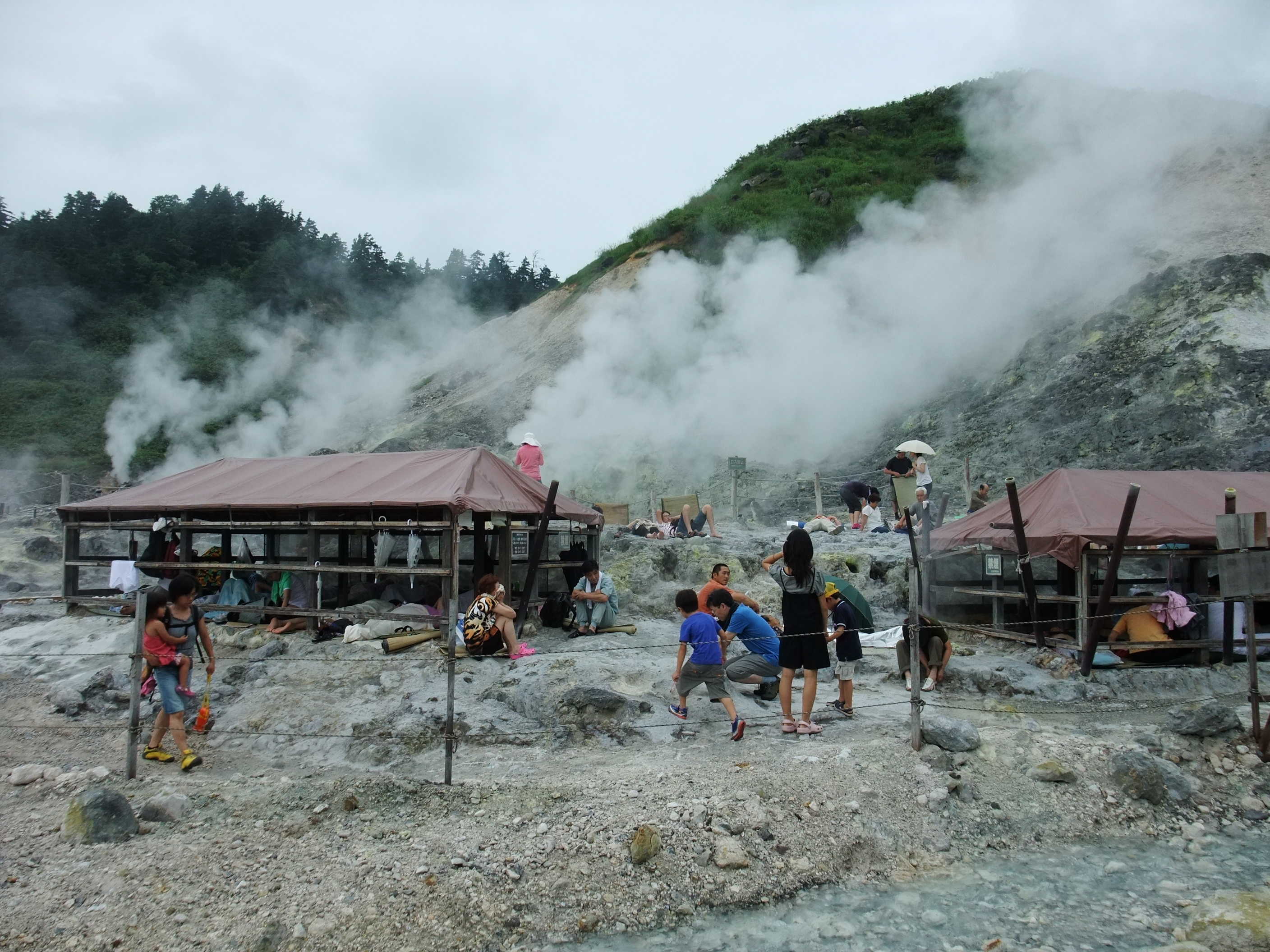
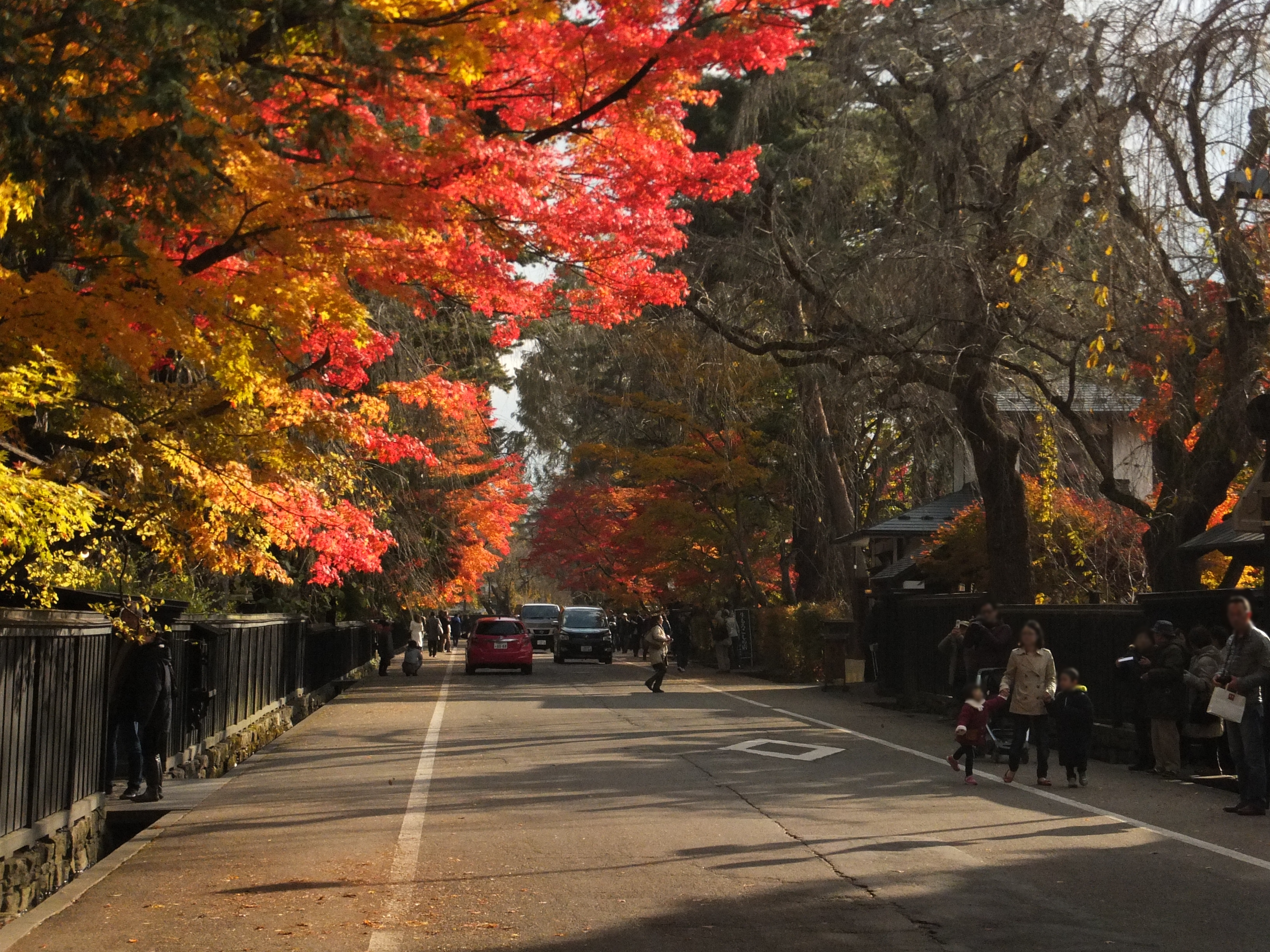
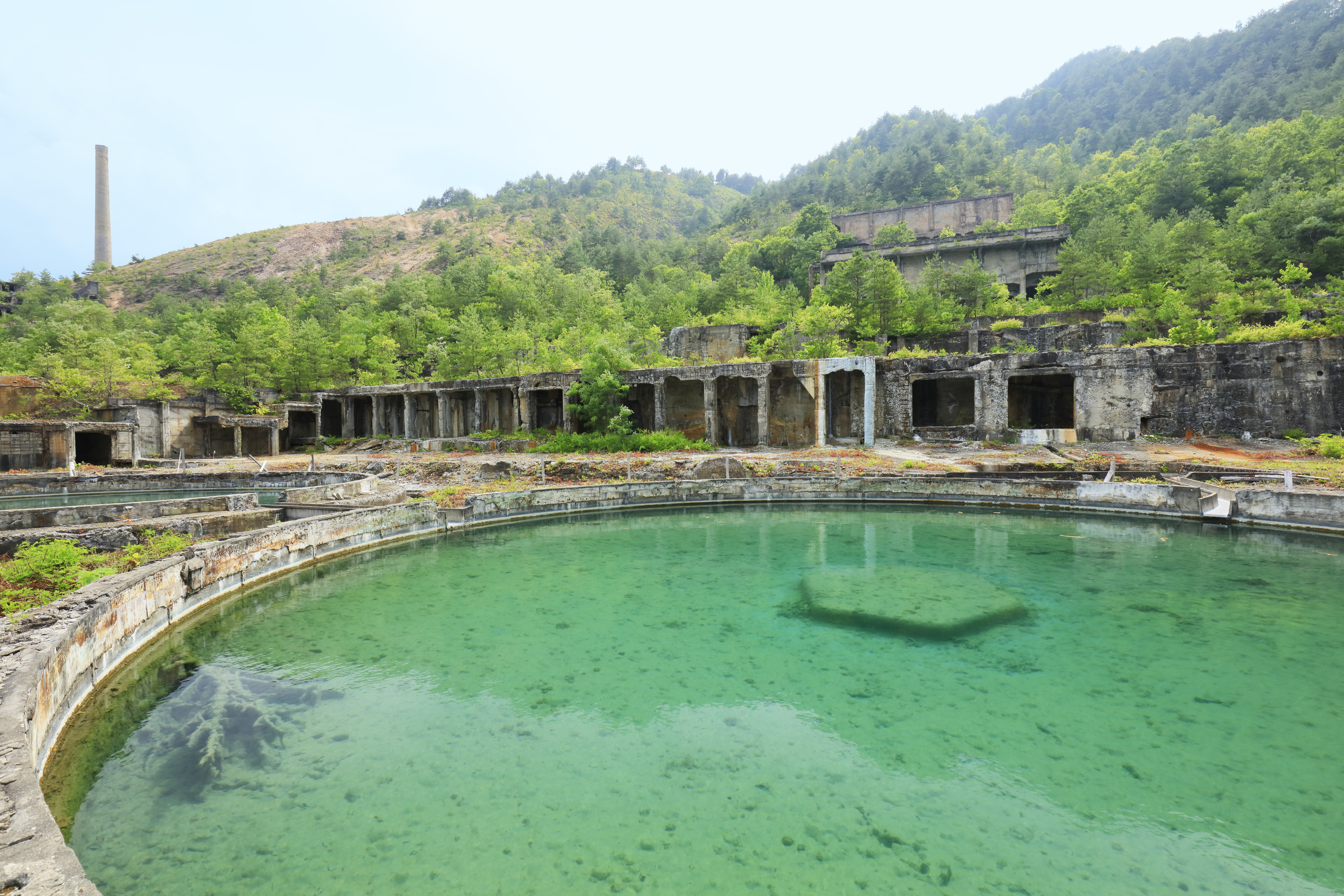
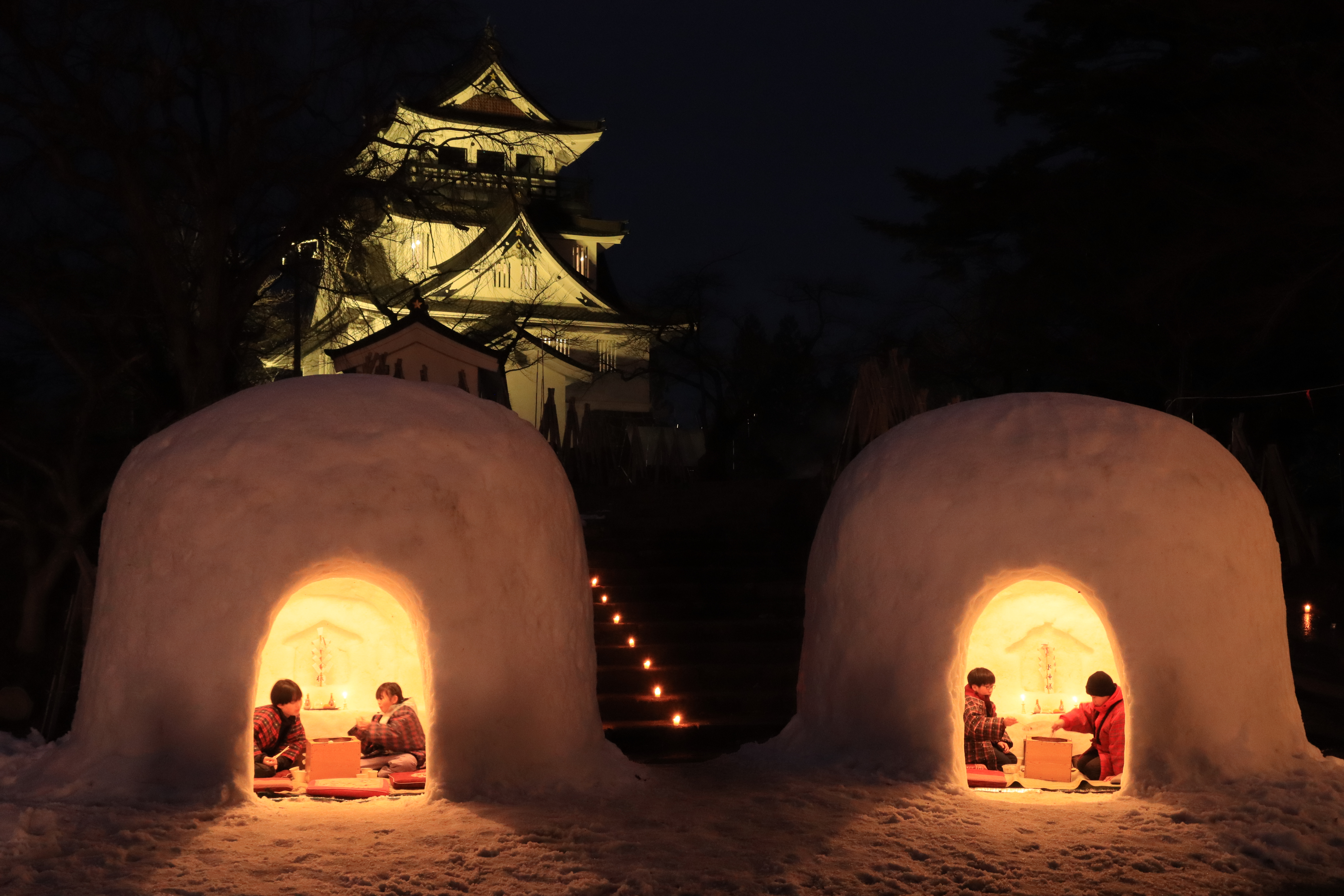
- Lake Tazawa Tamagawa Onsen Kakunodate Osarizawa Mine Kamakura

- Flag Symbol
- Anthem: Akita Kenminka and Kenmin no uta
- Country: Japan
- Region: Tōhoku
- Island: Honshu
- Capital: Akita
- Subdivisions: Districts: 6, Municipalities: 25

Government
  - Governor: Kenta Suzuki

Area
  - Total: 11,637.52 km^{2} (4,493.27 sq mi)
  - Rank: 6th

Population (August 1, 2023)
  - Total: 915,691
  - Rank: 38th
  - Density: 78.6844/km^{2} (203.792/sq mi)
  - Dialects: Akita・Nanbu (Kazuno)

GDP
  - Total: JP¥ 3,629 billion US$ 26.8 billion (2022)
- ISO 3166 code: JP-05
- Website: Akita Prefecture Official page of English
- Symbols of Japan
- Bird: Copper pheasant (Phasianus soemmerringii)
- Flower: Fuki (a kind of butterbur, Petasites japonicus)
- Tree: Akita-sugi (Cryptomeria japonica)

Akita Prefecture (秋田県, Akita-ken; Japanese pronunciation: [ä́.k̟ʲi̥.tä̀, ä̀.k̟ʲi̥.tä́.kè̞ɴ̀]) is a prefecture of Japan located in the Tōhoku region of Honshu. Its population is estimated 864,221 as of 1 October 2026 and its geographic area is 11,637 square kilometres (4,493 sq mi). Akita Prefecture is bordered by Aomori Prefecture to the north, Iwate Prefecture to the east, Miyagi Prefecture to the southeast, and Yamagata Prefecture to the south.

Akita is the capital and largest city of Akita Prefecture. Other major cities include Yokote, Daisen, and Yurihonjō. Akita Prefecture is located on the coast of the Sea of Japan and extends east to the Ōu Mountains, the longest mountain range in Japan, at the border with Iwate Prefecture. Akita Prefecture formed the northern half of the historic Dewa Province with Yamagata Prefecture.

== History ==
The region of Akita was created from the ancient provinces of Dewa and Mutsu.

Separated from the principal Japanese centres of commerce, politics, and population by several hundred kilometres and by the Ōu and Dewa mountain ranges to the east, Akita remained largely isolated from Japanese society until after the year 600. Akita was a region of hunter-gatherers and principally nomadic tribes.

The first historical record of what is now Akita Prefecture dates to 658, when Abe no Hirafu conquered the native Ezo tribes at what are now the cities of Akita and Noshiro. Abe, then governor of Koshi Province (the northwestern part of Honshū bordering the Sea of Japan), established a fort on the Mogami River, and thus began the Japanese settlement of the region.

In 733, a new military settlement (later renamed Akita Castle) was built in what is now the Takashimizu area of Akita, and more permanent roads and structures were developed. The region was used as a base of operations for the Japanese empire as it drove the native Ezo people from northern Honshū.

Governance of the region shifted hands several times. During the Tokugawa shogunate it was appropriated to the Satake clan, who ruled the region for 260 years and developed the agriculture and mining industries that are still predominant today. Throughout this period, it was classified as part of Dewa Province. In 1871, during the Meiji Restoration, Dewa Province was reshaped and the old daimyō domains were abolished and administratively reconstructed, resulting in the modern-day borders of Akita.

The famous Heian period waka poet, Ono no Komachi, is said to have been born in Yuzawa City, Ogachi Town, located in the southeast of the prefecture.

== Geography ==
Map of Akita Prefecture City Town Village

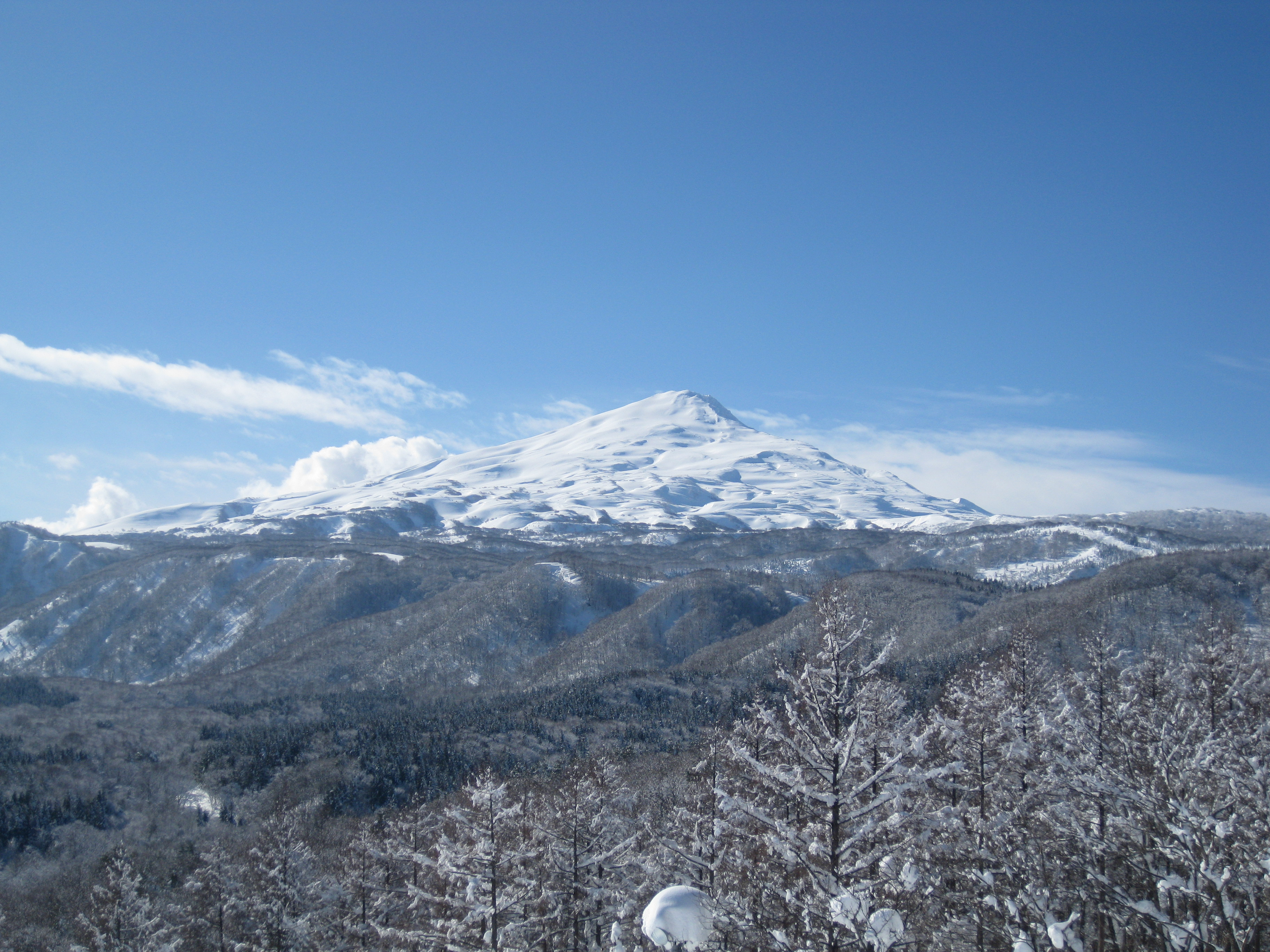
Mount Chōkai

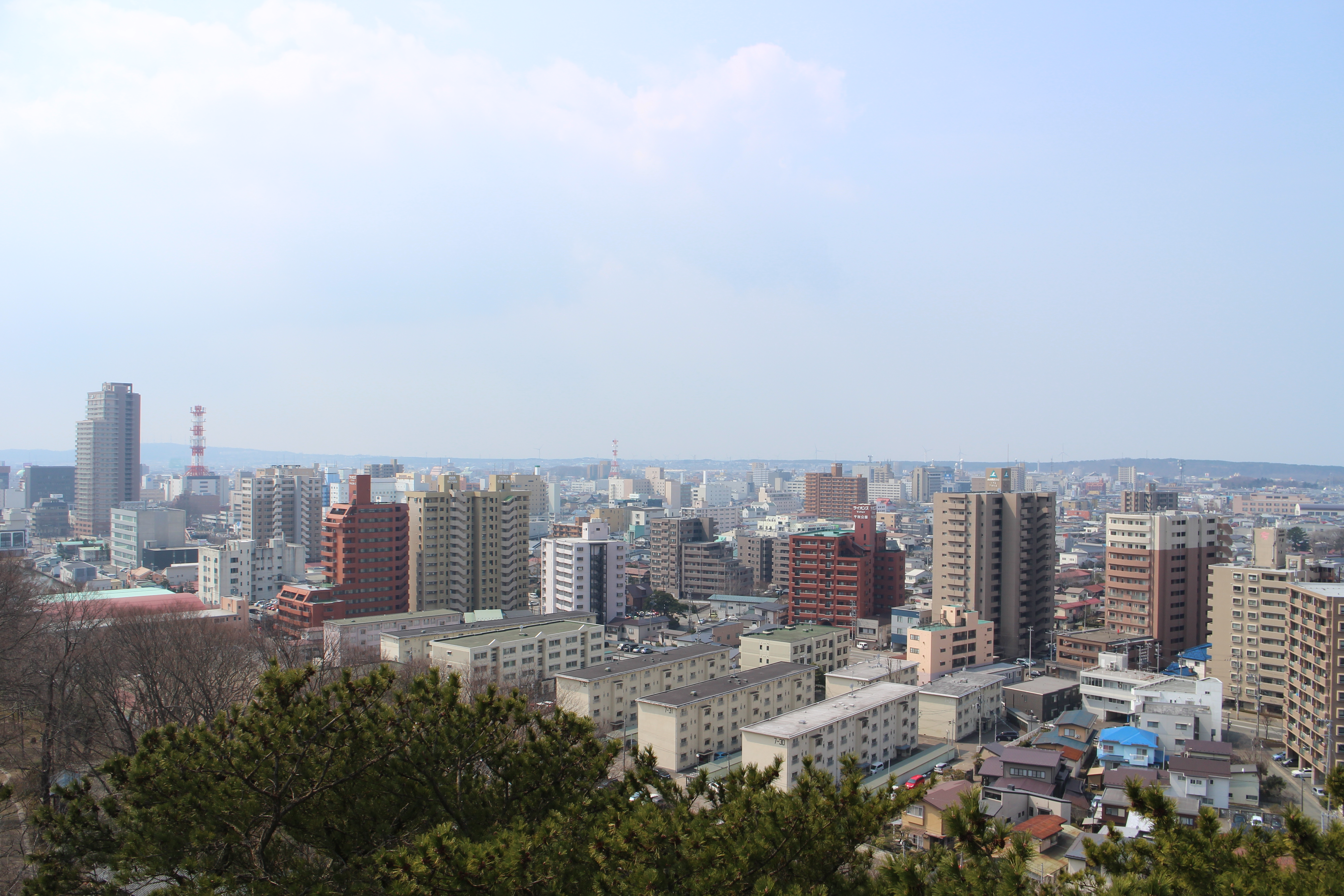
Akita City

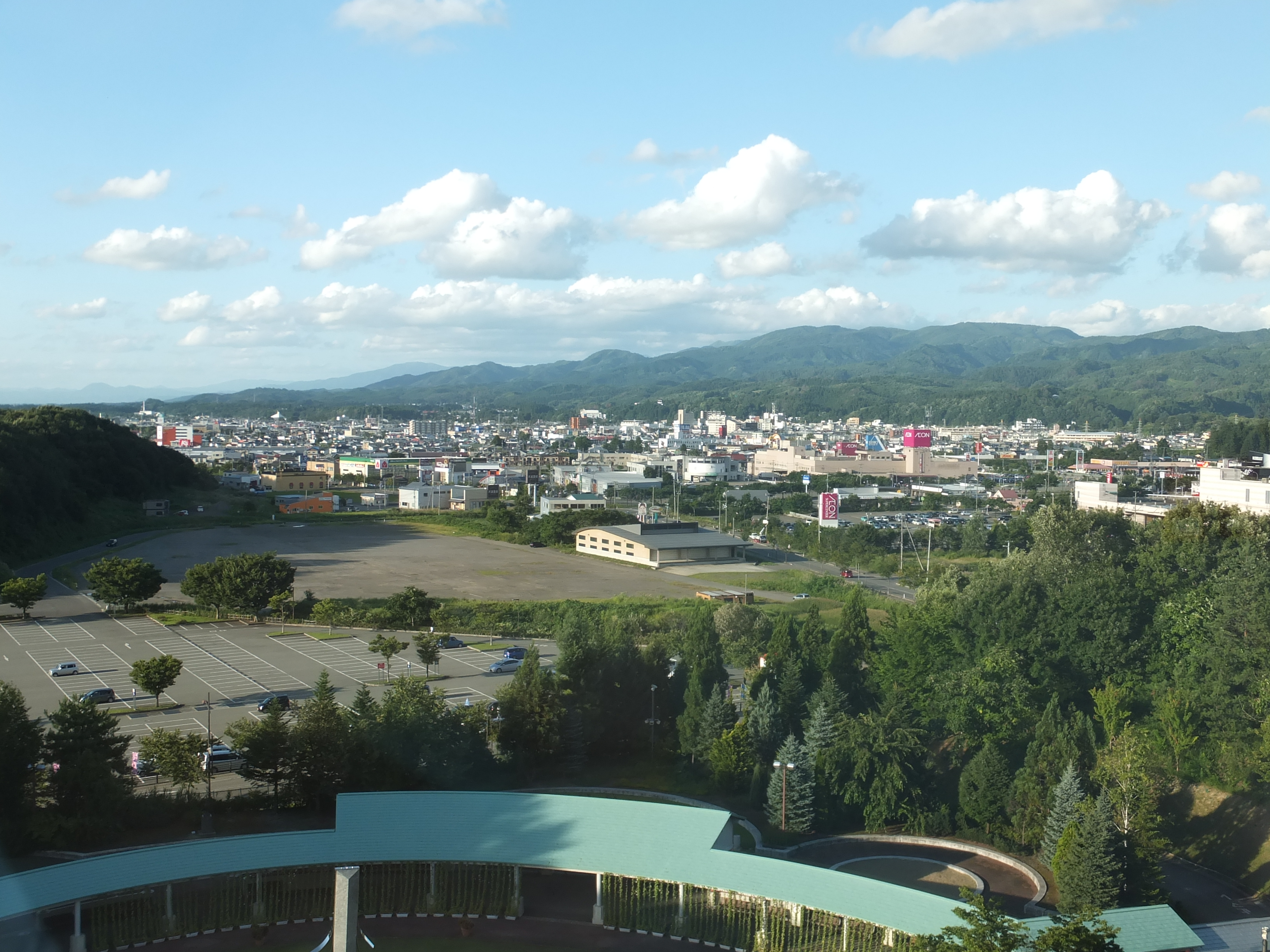
Yokote

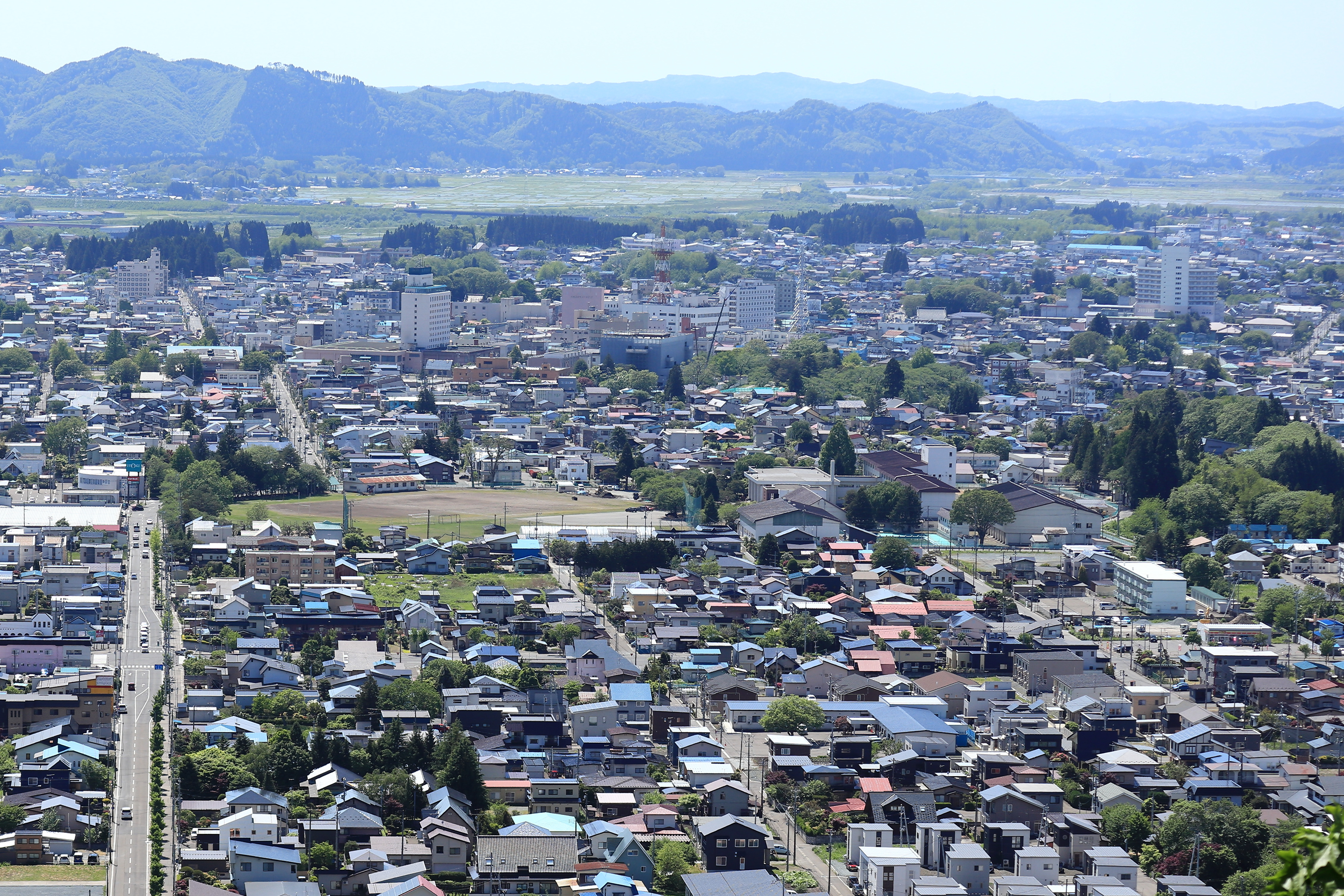
Ōdate

Historical population
Year	Pop.	±% p.a.
1872	582,297	—
1880	618,833	+0.76%
1890	697,298	+1.20%
1903	837,665	+1.42%
1913	943,628	+1.20%
1920	898,537	−0.70%
1925	936,408	+0.83%
1930	987,706	+1.07%
1935	1,037,744	+0.99%
1940	1,052,275	+0.28%
1945	1,211,871	+2.86%
1950	1,309,031	+1.55%
1955	1,348,871	+0.60%
1960	1,335,580	−0.20%
1965	1,279,835	−0.85%
1970	1,241,376	−0.61%
1975	1,232,481	−0.14%
1980	1,256,745	+0.39%
1985	1,254,032	−0.04%
1990	1,227,478	−0.43%
1995	1,213,667	−0.23%
2000	1,189,279	−0.41%
2005	1,145,501	−0.75%
2010	1,085,997	−1.06%
2015	1,023,119	−1.19%
2020	959,502	−1.28%

Located on the north-western side of Honshu, Akita Prefecture is adjacent to the Sea of Japan to the west and borders four other prefectures: Aomori in the north, Iwate in the east, Miyagi in the southeast, and Yamagata in the south.

The borders of Akita Prefecture roughly form a rectangle that is 169 kilometres (105 miles) from north to south and 86 kilometres (54 miles) from west to east. The Oga Peninsula is a prominent feature of the western edge, while the Ōu Mountains mark the eastern border and the higher Dewa Mountains run parallel through the center. Like much of northern Japan, the prefecture has cold winters, particularly in areas farther from the sea.

As of 31 March 2019, 11% of the total land area of the prefecture is designated as Natural Parks, namely the Towada-Hachimantai National Park; Chōkai, Kurikoma, and Oga Quasi-National Parks; and Akita Shirakami, Hachimori Iwadate, Kimimachizaka, Magi Mahiru, Moriyoshizan, Taiheizan, Tashirodake, and Tazawako Dakigaeri Prefectural Natural Parks.

=== Cities ===
Thirteen cities are located in Akita Prefecture:

Name		Area (km^{2})	Population	Population density (per km^{2})	Map
Rōmaji	Kanji	Area (km^{2})	Population	Population density (per km^{2})	Map
Akita (capital)	秋田市	906.07	305,625	337.31	
Daisen	大仙市	866.77	81,133	93.60	
Katagami	潟上市	97.76	32,585	333.32	
Kazuno	鹿角市	707.52	30,715	43.41	
Kitaakita	北秋田市	1,152.76	31,504	27.33	
Nikaho	にかほ市	241.13	24,291	100.74	
Noshiro	能代市	426.95	52,283	122.46	
Oga	男鹿市	241.09	26,930	111.70	
Ōdate	大館市	913.22	71,558	78.36	
Semboku	仙北市	1,093.64	25,857	23.64	
Yokote	横手市	692.8	89,574	129.29	
Yurihonjō	由利本荘市	1,209.6	76,077	62.89	
Yuzawa	湯沢市	790.91	44,346	56.07	

=== Towns and villages ===
These are the towns and villages in each district:

Name		Area (km^{2})	Population	Population density (per km^{2})	District	Type	Map
Rōmaji	Kanji	Area (km^{2})	Population	Population density (per km^{2})	District	Type	Map
Fujisato	藤里町	281.98	3,180	11.28	Yamamoto District	Town	
Gojōme	五城目町	214.94	9,015	41.94	Minamiakita District	Town	
Hachirōgata	八郎潟町	17	5,749	338.18	Minamiakita District	Town	
Happō	八峰町	234.14	7,025	30	Yamamoto District	Town	
Higashinaruse	東成瀬村	203.57	2,512	12.34	Ogachi District	Village	
Ikawa	井川町	47.95	4,658	97.14	Minamiakita District	Town	
Kamikoani	上小阿仁村	256.72	2,247	8.75	Kitaakita District	Village	
Kosaka	小坂町	201.7	4,986	24.72	Kazuno District	Town	
Misato	美郷町	168.34	19,337	114.87	Senboku District	Town	
Mitane	三種町	248.09	16,172	65.19	Yamamoto District	Town	
Ōgata	大潟村	170.11	3,164	18.60	Minamiakita District	Village	
Ugo	羽後町	230.78	14,639	63.43	Ogachi District	Town	

== List of governors of Akita Prefecture (from 1947) ==
Nº	Name	Term start	Term end	Notes (political party)
1	Kosaku Hasuike (蓮池公咲)	12 April 1947	4 April 1951	Akita Prefecture Democratic Party (秋田県民主党)
2	Tokuji Ikeda (池田徳治)	30 April 1951	29 April 1955	Independent (無所属)
3	Yujiro Obata (小畑勇二郎)	30 April 1955	29 April 1979	Independent
4	Kikuji Sasaki (佐々木喜久治)	30 April 1979	31 March 1997	Independent
5	Sukeshiro Terata (寺田典城)	20 April 1997	19 April 2009	Independent
6	Norihisa Satake (佐竹敬久)	20 April 2009	19 April 2025	Independent
7	Kenta Suzuki (鈴木健太)	20 April 2025		Independent

== Economy and population ==
Akita prefecture population pyramid in 2020

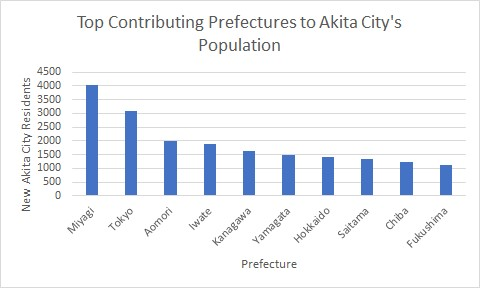
Note: Data in the chart above was taken over the course of five years (2003-2008). The graph shows how many people migrated to Akita City from other prefectures. Overall the net gain of new residents was 4,981 people, or 1.5%.

Like much of the Tōhoku Region, Akita's economy remains dominated by traditional industries such as agriculture, fishing, and forestry. This has led many young people to migrate to Tokyo and other large cities. Akita Prefecture has seen some of the most severe population decline in Japan: it is one of four prefectures in Japan registering declines in population since 1955. Its population also has the lowest percentage of children (defined as under the age of 15), at 9.3% in 2022, down from 11.2% in 2010. 38.6% of residents are 65 or older, the highest percentage of any Japanese prefecture. As of October 1, 2022, it has an estimated population of 944,902 people.

The high rate of depopulation in Akita Prefecture has led smaller communities to merge with each other, which has affected the smallest of these merged communities. As depopulation in these communities continues, educational and health facilities have closed in some areas, encouraging families to migrate to larger cities for better access to health and educational opportunities and perpetuating the decline in population. This decline, combined with an aging population, has been concerning for rural communities.

== Culture ==
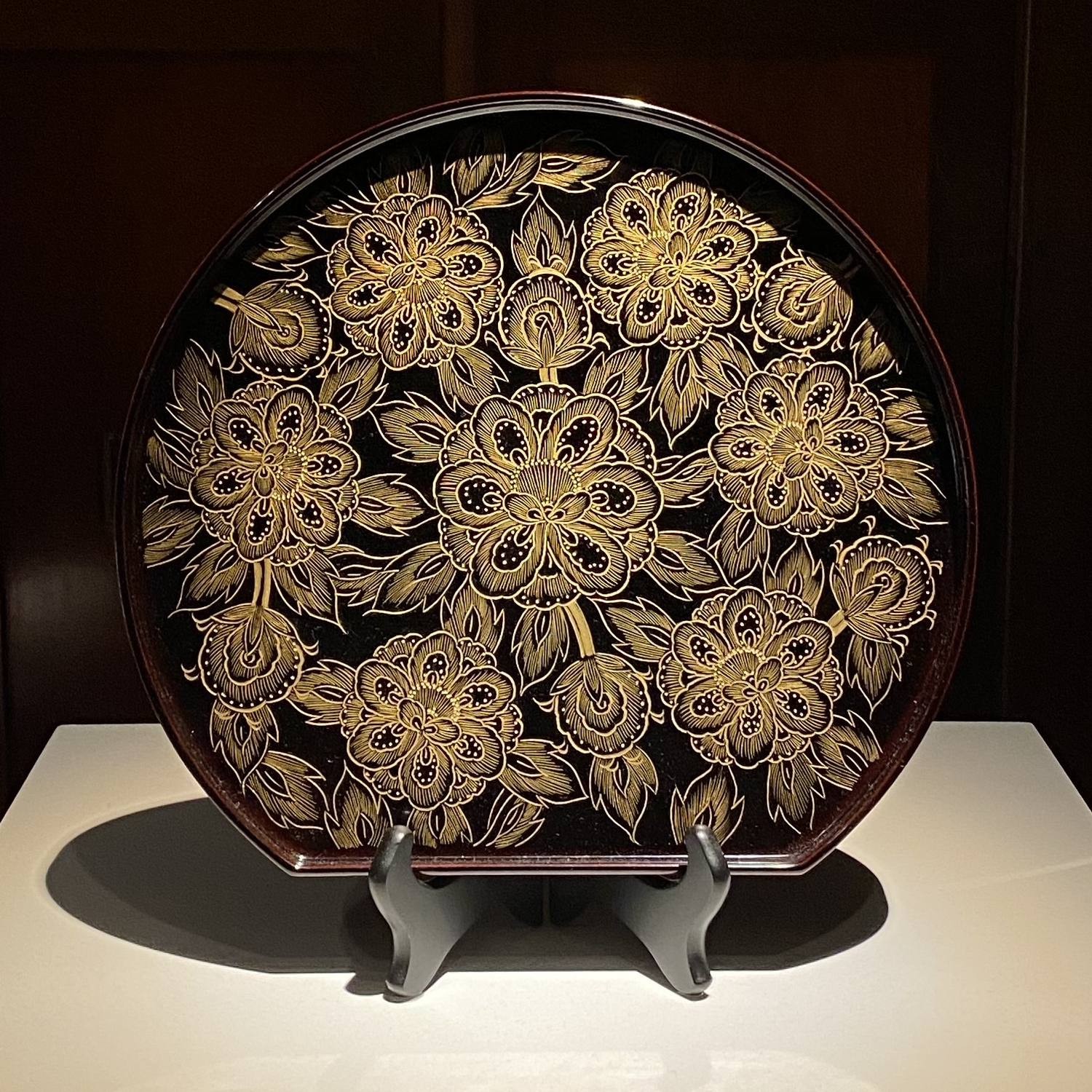
Kawatsura Shikki lacquerware in the Prince Consort Gallery, V&A, London (2024)

Akita, 秋田, meaning autumn rice paddy, is famous for rice farming and its sake breweries. It is well known for having the highest consumption of sake in Japan and is thought to be the origin of the Akita breed of dog which carries the prefecture's name. The women of the region, referred to as Akita Bijin (秋田美人, 'Beauties of Akita'), have also gained widespread renown for their white skin, rounded faces and high voices, all of which are considered highly desirable. Ono no Komachi is a famous example of an Akita bijin.

=== Food ===
Akita is known for the following regional specialties (tokusanhin):

- Kiritanpo Nabe
- Gakko
- Rice – Akita komachi
- Sake

=== Sports ===
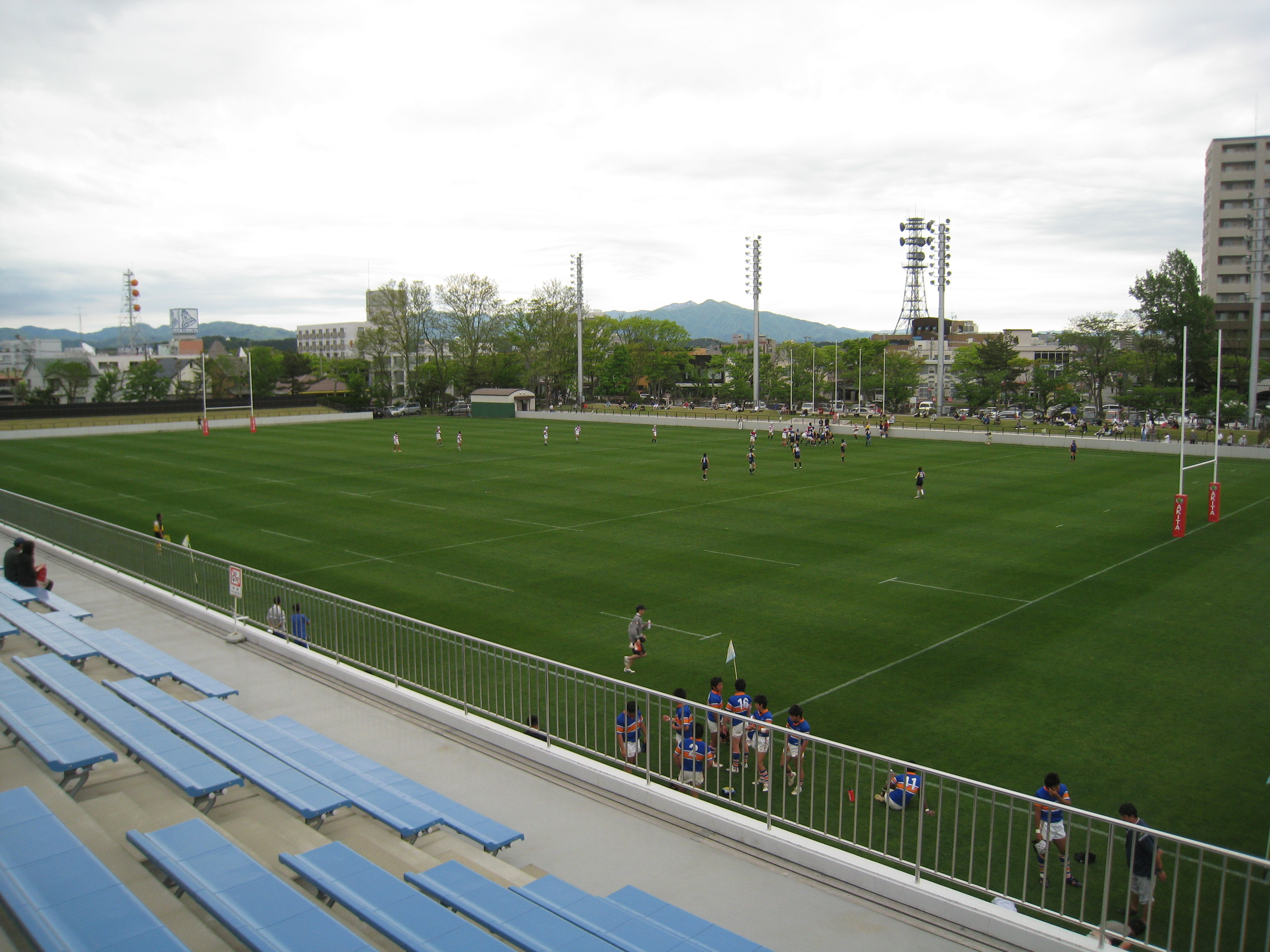
Akita Sports Plus ASP Stadium.

- Akita Bank Red Arrows, women's basketball team.
- Akita Northern Bullets, rugby union team.
- Akita Northern Happinets, men's basketball team.
- Blaublitz Akita, association football team.
- Prestige International Aranmare Akita, women's basketball team.

== Tourism ==
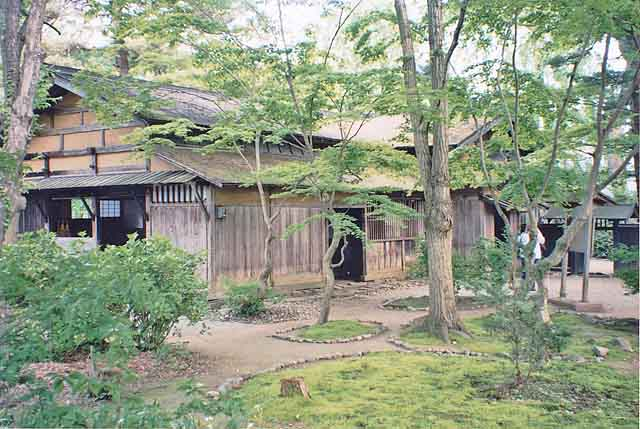
Samurai house in Kakunodate

Recently there have been efforts to revitalize rural communities facing depopulation with different forms of green tourism and agritourism. These efforts are primarily aimed at attracting urbanites and foreign tourists to Akita Prefecture, advertising its pristine forests, sprawling rice fields, and range of cultures. There has been a push for home stays, farmers markets for locally produced foods, and the integration of outsiders into local cultural practices. The Namahage ritual in Oga on New Year's Eve draws a large number of tourists to Akita Prefecture every year.

Near Lake Tazawa, there are a number of hot springs resorts (onsen). These are popular with tourists from all over Japan. In addition, numerous seasonal festivals (matsuri) offer a glimpse of rural or traditional Japan. Some famous examples are the Akita Kantō, the Omagari Fireworks, Namahage Festival, and the Yokote Kamakura Festivals.

Kakunodate, known as the little Kyoto, features many preserved samurai houses. The Aoyagi house is the former residence of Odano Naotake, who illustrated Japan's first modern guide to human anatomy. The house is now a museum and gallery of medical illustrations and traditional crafts.

Starting in 2009, Akita began experiencing a huge surge in Korean tourism after the airing of the popular drama Iris, which featured several scenes shot in Akita, most notably at Lake Tazawa and Oga's GAO Aquarium.

== Famous festival and events ==
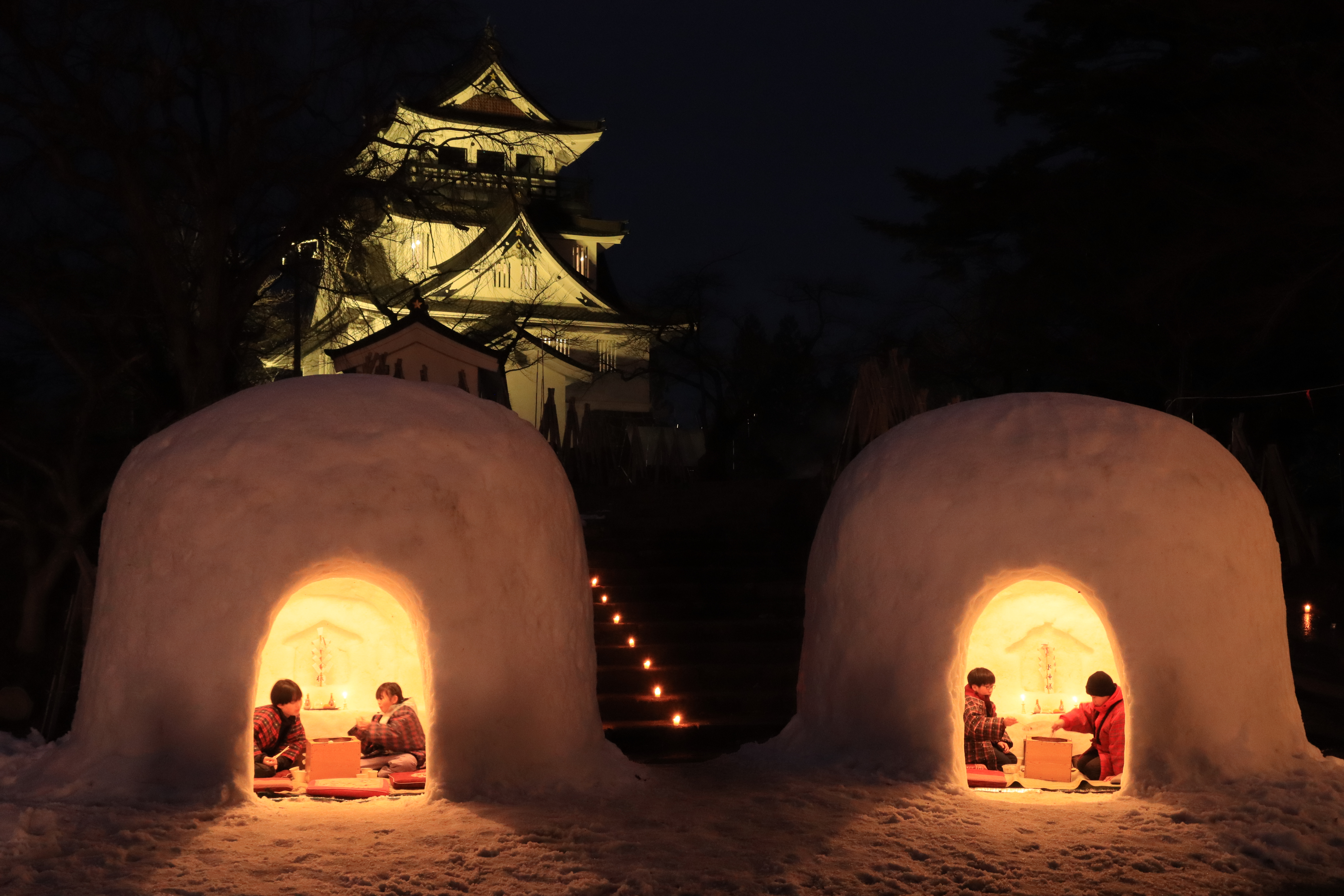
Yokote Kamakura Festival in February

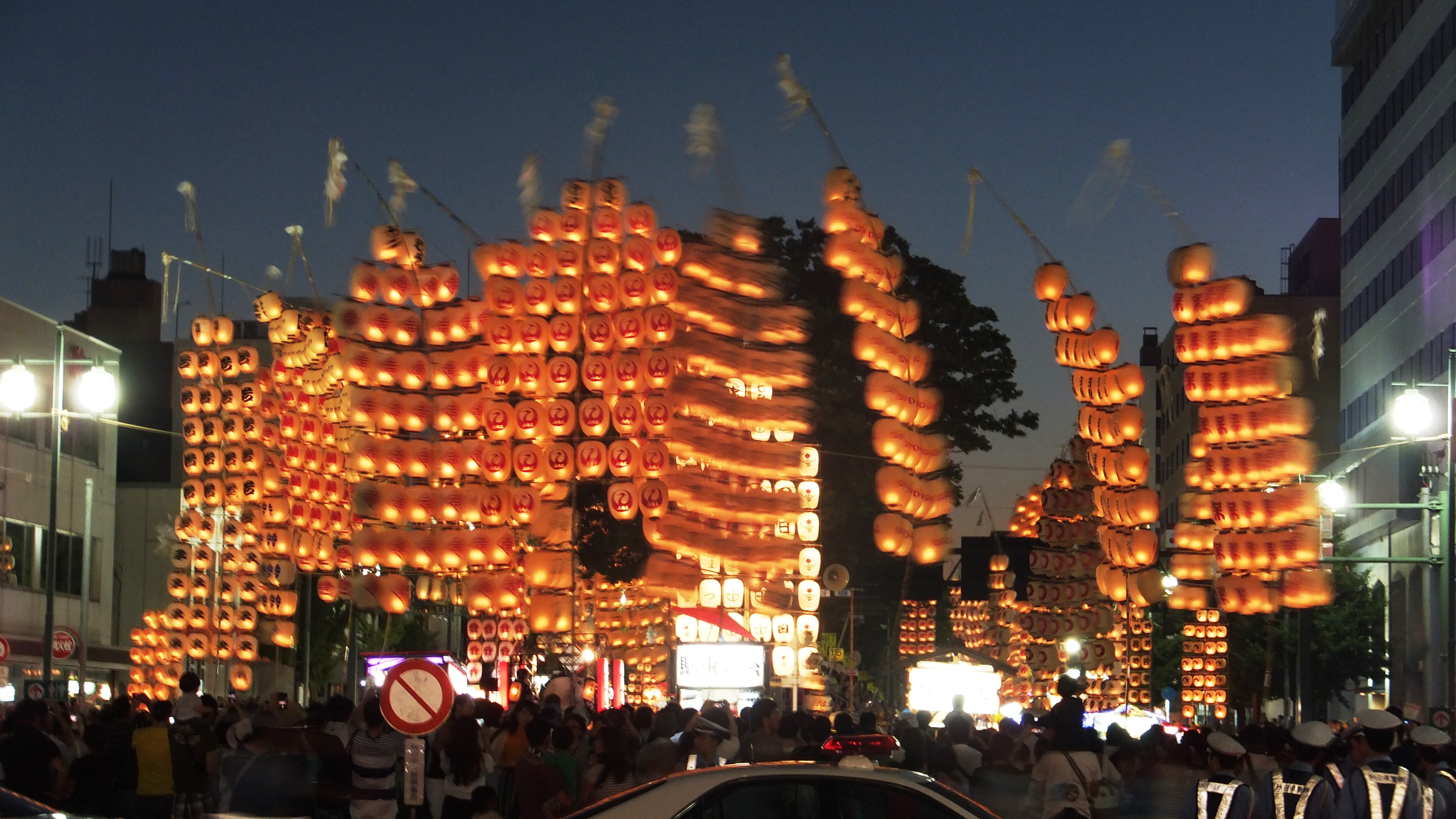
A night view of Akita Kanto Festival in August

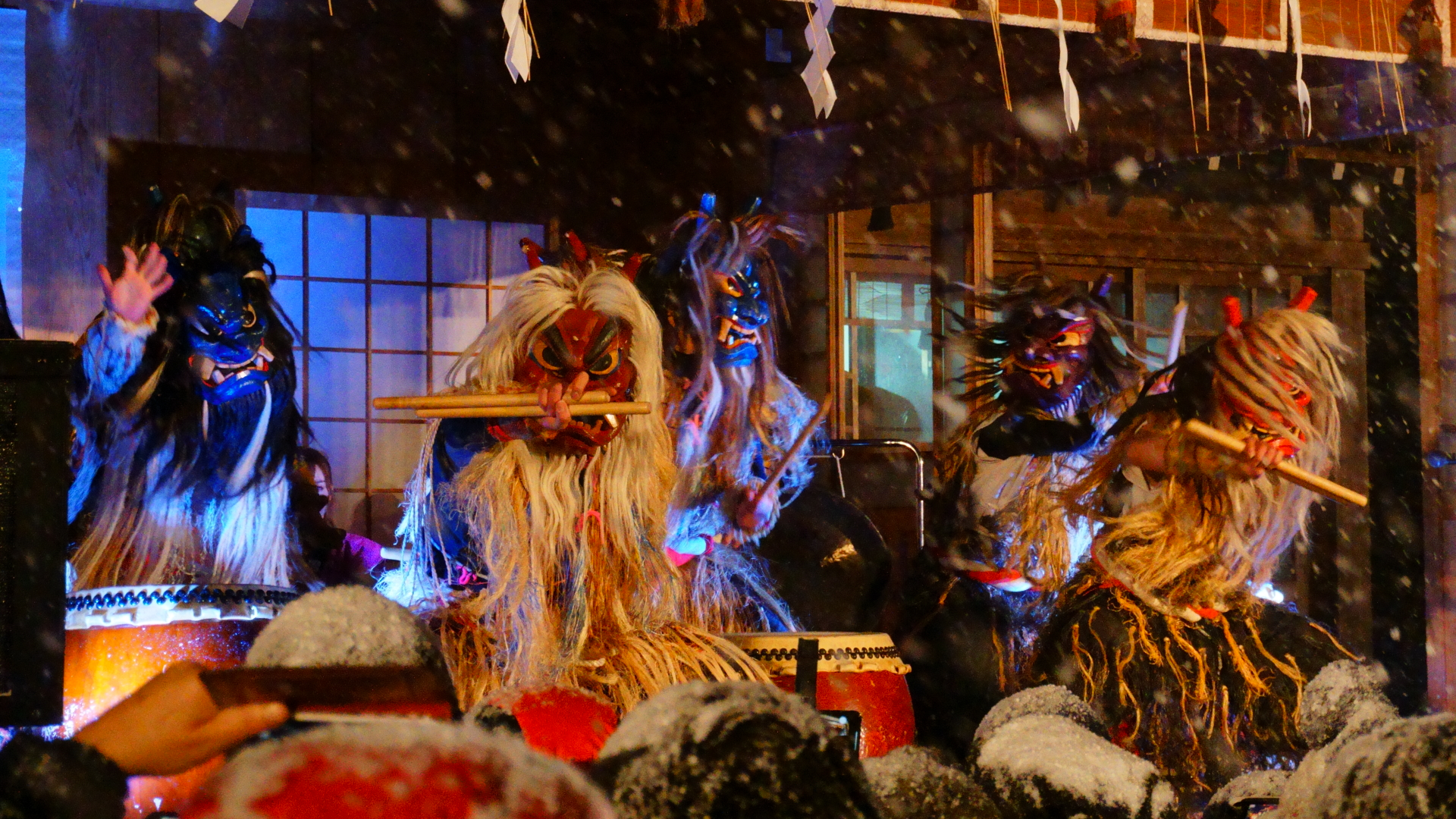
A performance of Namahage in Oga, an annual event on New Year's Eve

- Kariwano Big Tug Festival, Daisen (February)
- Amekko Festival, Odate (February)
- Kamakura Snow Statue Event, Yokote (February)
- Tsuchizaki Shinmei Festival, Akita (July)
- Akita Kanto Festival, Akita (August)
- Nishimonai Bon Dancing Festival, Ugo (August)
- Kemanai Bon Dancing Festival, Daisen (August)
- All Japan Firework Competition, Daisen (August)
- Kakunodate Festival, Semboku (September)

== Transportation ==
=== Railroads ===
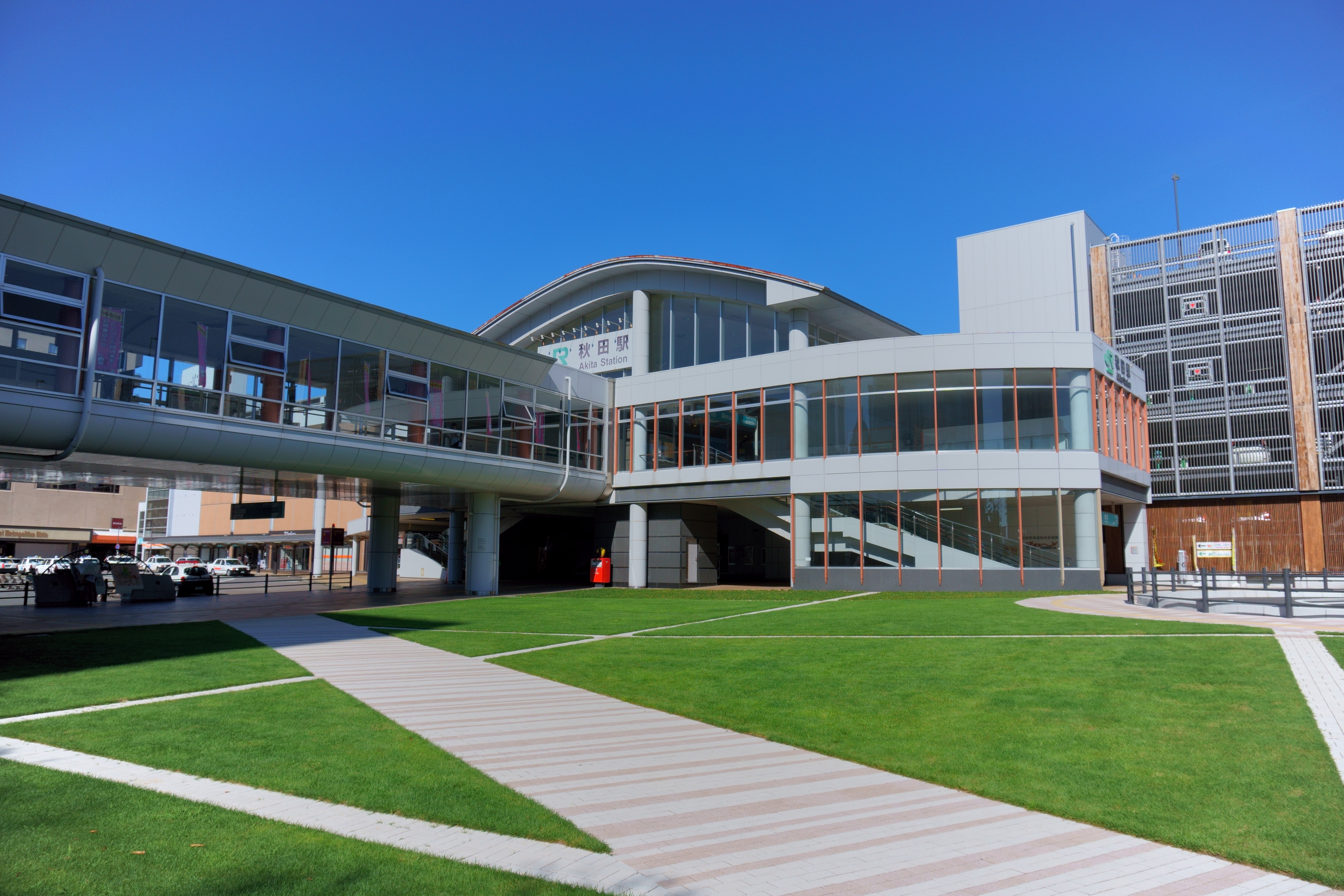
JR Akita Station

- Akita Nairiku Jukan Tetsudo ("Akita Inland Longitudinal Railway")
  - Akita Nairiku Line
- JR East
  - Akita Shinkansen
  - Gono Line
  - Hanawa Line
  - Kitakami Line
  - Oga Line
  - Ōu Main Line
  - Tazawako Line
  - Uetsu Main Line
- Yuri Kogen Railway
  - Chōkai Sanroku Line

=== Roads ===
==== Expressways ====
- Akita Expressway
- Nihonkai-Tohoku Expressway
- Tōhoku-Chūō Expressway
- Tohoku Expressway

==== National highways ====
- Route 7 (-Nikaho-Yurihonjō-Akita-Katagami-Ikawa-Gojōme-Hachirōgata-Mitane-Noshiro-Kitaakita-Ōdate-)
- Route 13 (-Yuzawa-Yokote-Misato-Daisen-Akita)
- Route 46 (-Semboku-Daisen-Akita)
- Route 101 (-Happō-Noshiro-Mitane-Oga-Katagami-Akita)
- Route 103 (-Kosaka-Kazuno-Ōdate)
- Route 104 (-Kazuno-Ōdate)
- Route 105 (Yurihonjō-Daisen-Semboku-Kitaakita)
- Route 107 (-Yokote-Yurihonjō)
- Route 108 (-Yuzawa-Yurihonjō)
- Route 282 (-Kazuno-Kosaka-)
- Route 341 (Kazuno-Semboku-Daisen-Akita-Yurihonjō)
- Route 342 (Yokote-Higashinaruse-)
- Route 397 (-Higashinaruse-Yokote)
- Route 398 (-Yuzawa-Ugo-Yurihonjō)
- Route 454 (-Kazuno-Towada, Aomori-Kosaka-)

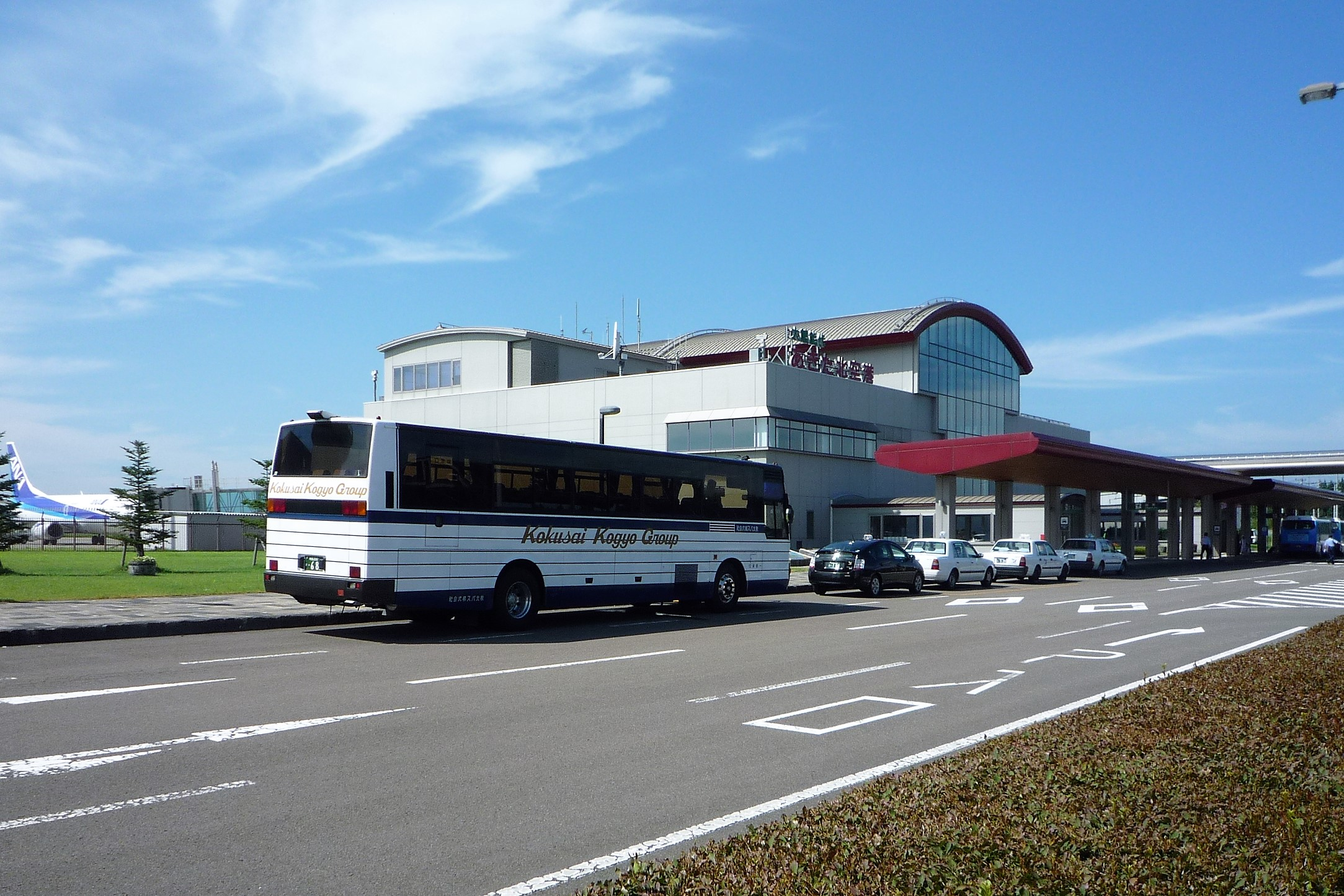
Odate Noshiro Airport

=== Airports ===
- Akita Airport
- Odate-Noshiro Airport

== Education ==
=== Universities in Akita Prefecture ===
- Akita International University
- Akita Prefectural University
- Akita University
- Akita University of Nursing and Welfare
- North Asia University

== Media ==
=== Television ===
- Akita Asahi Broadcasting (AAB)
- Akita Broadcasting System (ABS)
- Akita Television (AKT)
- NHK Akita Broadcasting (NHK)
