= List of governors of prefectures of Japan =

These are lists of governors of prefectures of Japan.

Many prefectures are missing.

- List of current Japanese governors
- List of governors of Aichi Prefecture
- List of governors of Aomori Prefecture
- List of governors of Hokkaido Prefecture
- List of governors of Hiroshima Prefecture
- List of governors of Ibaraki Prefecture
- List of governors of Ishikawa Prefecture
- List of governors of Kanagawa Prefecture
- List of governors of Kumamoto Prefecture
- List of governors of Kyoto Prefecture
- List of governors of Miyagi Prefecture
- List of governors of Nagano Prefecture
- List of governors of Niigata Prefecture
- List of governors of Okayama Prefecture
- List of governors of Okinawa Prefecture
- List of governors of Osaka Prefecture
- List of governors of Saga Prefecture
- List of governors of Saitama Prefecture
- List of governors of Shiga Prefecture
