= Kenta Suzuki =

Governor of Akita Prefecture since 2025

- 鈴木 健太
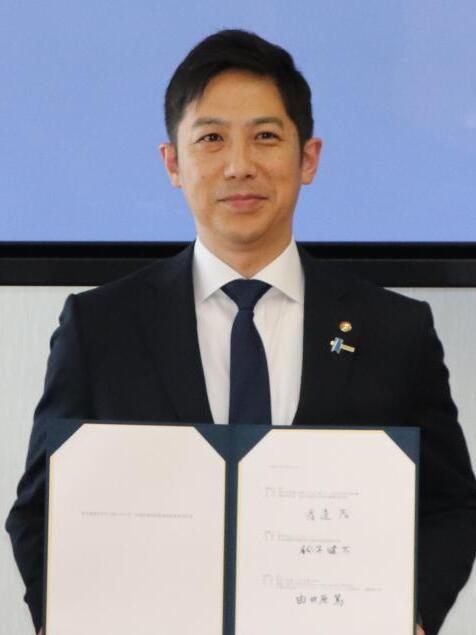
- Suzuki in 2025

Governor of Akita Prefecture
- Incumbent
- Assumed office 20 April 2025
- Monarch: Naruhito
- Preceded by: Norihisa Satake

Vice-Speaker of the Akita Prefectural Assembly
- In office 25 May 2023 – 16 November 2024

Member of the Akita Prefectural Assembly
- In office 2015 – 26 November 2024
- Constituency: Akita City

Personal details
- Born: 24 August 1975 (age 51) Osaka Prefecture, Japan
- Party: Independent (since 2025)
- Other political affiliations: LDP (2015–2025)
- Education: Kyoto University

Kenta Suzuki (Japanese: 鈴木健太, Hepburn: Suzuki Kenta; born 24 August 1975) is a Japanese politician currently serving as Governor of Akita Prefecture as an independent politician.

He previously served as a member of the Akita Prefectural Assembly as the 73rd Vice-Speaker and was a member of the Japan Ground Self-Defense Force.

== Biography ==
Suzuki was born in Osaka Prefecture and grew up in Kobe, Hyōgo Prefecture His family ran a newspaper shop, and he played baseball from elementary school through high school. While retaking his university entrance exams, he survived the Kobe earthquake, aiding in the rescue of elderly people from the rubble.

He graduated from the Faculty of Law at Kyoto University in 2000 and joined the Japan Ground Self-Defense Force (JGSDF). Suzuki later attended the Officer Candidate School and was assigned to the 16th Infantry Regiment. He was also deployed to the United Nations Peacekeeping Operations in Timor-Leste and Iraq.

In 2006, Suzuki retired from the JGSDF and moved to Akita City, the hometown of his wife, whom he met at the Officer Candidate School. Subsequently, he studied at the prefectural library and obtained a judicial scrivener's licence. In 2015, Suzuki ran for the Akita City constituency in the Akita Prefectural Assembly election as a member of the conservative Liberal Democratic Party, and won two of his three political races.

In February 2021, it was reported that he was considering running in the Akita Prefectural Gubernatorial election, but he declined to run in a later statement.

He also served as Vice-Speaker of the Prefectural Assembly between 2023 and 2024.

In November 2024, Suzuki announced his candidacy for the 2025 Akita Prefectural Gubernatorial election upon the expiration of his term at the prefectural assembly. He resigned from his seat after winning the election, and left the Liberal Democratic Party in January 2025.

In the election, he defeated former Akita Vice Governor Kazuzo Saruta and others, winning his first election for Governor of Akita.
