= Yoshihide Esaki =

Japanese politician

- 江崎禎英
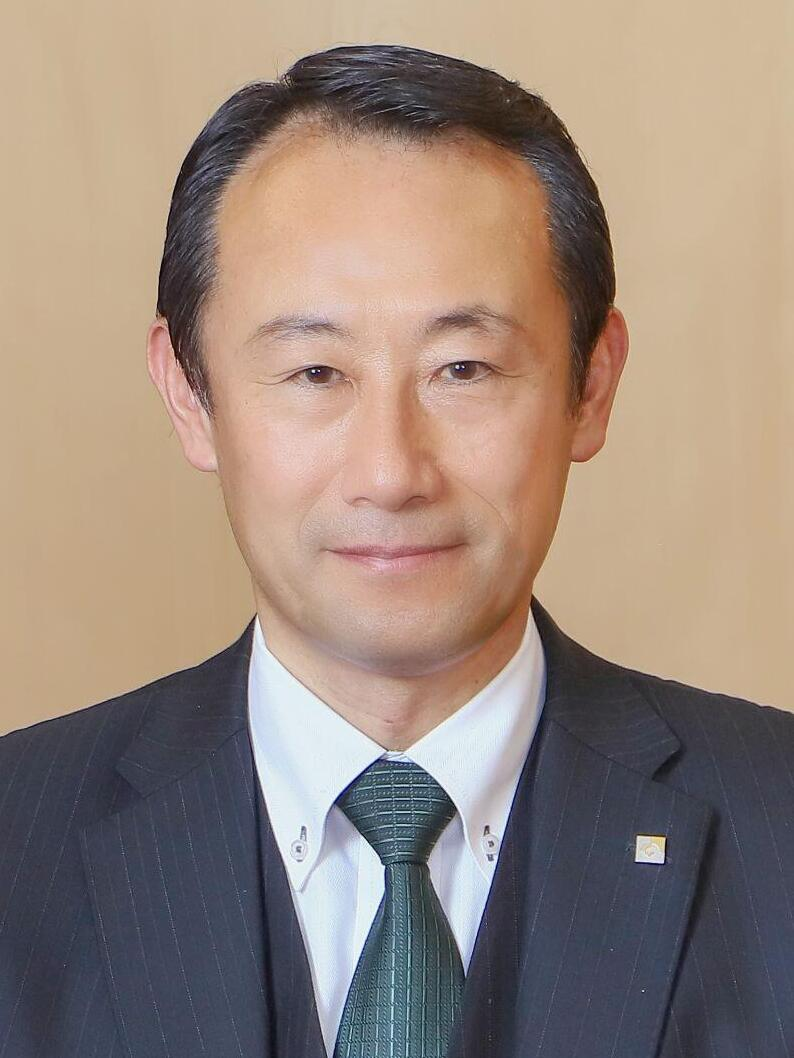
- Esaki in 2025

Governor of Gifu Prefecture
- Incumbent
- Assumed office 6 February 2025
- Preceded by: Hajime Furuta

Personal details
- Born: November 27, 1964 (age 61) Miyama, Gifu, Japan
- Party: Independent
- Education: University of Tokyo

Yoshihide Esaki (江崎禎英, Esaki Yoshihide; born 27 November 1964) is a Japanese politician who has served as governor of Gifu Prefecture since February 2025.

== Biography ==
Esaki was born on 27 November 1964, in the former town of Miyama, Gifu Prefecture, (present-day; part of Yamagata City). He graduated from Gifu Prefectural Kanō High School and the University of Tokyo, where he studied international relations.

Esaki joined the Ministry of International Trade and Industry in 1989. He subsequently worked in a number of government positions involving trade policy, information policy, energy policy, healthcare and social policy. During his career in central government, he was also involved in policy relating to personal information protection and energy and climate policy.

In 2008, Esaki was seconded to the Gifu Prefectural Government. He served in the prefectural administration, including as director-general of the Department of Commerce and Labor, before returning to central government.

Esaki later served as director of the Healthcare Industry Division of the Ministry of Economy, Trade and Industry. In that position, he was involved in policies concerning the development of the healthcare industry and the extension of healthy life expectancy.

In 2017, Esaki became policy coordination director-general of the Commerce and Service Industry Policy Group at the Ministry of Economy, Trade and Industry, while also serving as deputy director of the Health and Medical Strategy Office of the Cabinet Secretariat. In 2018, he was additionally appointed coordinating director-general of the Medical Policy Bureau of the Ministry of Health, Labour and Welfare.

In 2020, Esaki became a councillor in the Cabinet Office, with responsibility for science, technology and innovation. He was involved in the Japanese government's response to the COVID-19 pandemic. He retired from the Ministry of Economy, Trade and Industry in November 2020.

In January 2021, Esaki ran as an independent candidate in the 2021 Gifu gubernatorial election, finishing second. He subsequently established the Institute for Social Policy Studies in Gifu Prefecture and became its director.

In August 2024, following Governor Hajime Furuta's announcement that he would not seek a sixth term, Esaki announced his candidacy for the 2025 Gifu gubernatorial election.

Esaki won the election held on January 26, 2025, defeating his opponent in a two-candidate race. His election ended Furuta's approximately 20-year tenure as governor.

Esaki took office as governor on February 6, 2025.

== Political views and activities ==
Esaki has advocated the idea that people can live to the age of 120, which he refers to as the "Great Kanreki". He has argued for the development of economic and social systems suited to an era of longer life expectancy.

As governor, Esaki has emphasized creating a Gifu Prefecture characterized by "security and excitement" and attracting people and goods to the prefecture. In his inaugural address, he stated that policy solutions should be sought together with residents and at the local level.

Political offices
Preceded by Hajime Furuta	Governor of Gifu Prefecture; 6 February 2025 – present	Incumbent
