= Katsuyuki Ichimi =

Japanese politician

- 一見 勝之
- Ichimi in 2026

Governor of Mie Prefecture
- Incumbent
- Assumed office 14 September 2021
- Monarch: Naruhito
- Preceded by: Eikei Suzuki

Personal details
- Born: 30 January 1963 (age 63) Kameyama, Mie, Japan
- Party: Independent
- Education: University of Tokyo (LLB)

Katsuyuki Ichimi (一見 勝之, Ichimi Katsuyuki; born 30 January 1963) is a Japanese politician. He currently serves as governor of Mie Prefecture since 2021.
