= Toshihito Kumagai =

Japanese politician

- 熊谷 俊人
- Kumagai in 2026

Governor of Chiba Prefecture
- Incumbent
- Assumed office 5 April 2021
- Monarch: Naruhito
- Preceded by: Kensaku Morita

Mayor of Chiba City
- In office 14 June 2009 – 3 March 2021
- Preceded by: Keiichi Tsuruoka; Kenji Fujishiro (acting)
- Succeeded by: Shun'ichi Kamiya

Member of the Chiba City Assembly
- In office 1 May 2005 – May 2009
- Constituency: Inage Ward

Personal details
- Born: 18 February 1978 (age 48) Tenri, Nara, Japan
- Party: Independent (since 2009)
- Other political affiliations: Democratic (2007–2009)
- Education: Waseda University (BEc)

Toshihito Kumagai (熊谷俊人, Kumagai Toshihito; born 18 February 1978) is a Japanese politician who has served as governor of Chiba Prefecture since 2021. Governor Kumagai was re-elected as the governor of Chiba Prefecture for a second term on the 16th of March 2025.

== Early life and education ==
Kumagai was born is Tenri, Nara in February 1978. Due to his father's work, the family consistently moved from prefecture to prefecture. He was affected by the Great Hanshin Earthquake in 1995 when he was a high school student. He said in an interview that this was the reason why he got interested in politics. He graduated on Waseda University's School of Political Science and Economics in 2001. He later joined the NTT Communications, where he was in charge of business integration and acquisition programs in the planning department.
