= Mika Yokota =

Japanese politician and former civil servant

- 横田 美香
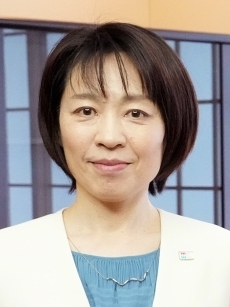
- Yokota in 2026

Governor of Hiroshima Prefecture
- Incumbent
- Assumed office 29 November 2025
- Preceded by: Hidehiko Yuzaki

Personal details
- Born: 1 August 1971 (age 55) Kure, Hiroshima, Japan
- Party: Independent
- Education: University of Tokyo
- Website: yokota-mika.jp

Mika Yokota (横田 美香, Yokota Mika; born 1 August 1971) is a Japanese politician and former civil servant serving as Governor of Hiroshima since November 2025. She previously served as Vice Governor of Toyama Prefecture and Hiroshima Prefecture, and held senior positions in Japan's Ministry of Agriculture, Forestry and Fisheries and the Cabinet Secretariat. She is the first woman elected Governor of Hiroshima Prefecture and the first female governor in the Chūgoku region.

== Early life and education ==
Yokota was born in Kure, Hiroshima Prefecture. During her childhood she lived in Rio de Janeiro, Brazil, for several years while her father was stationed overseas. She graduated from Hiroshima University Fuzoku Senior High School before earning a law degree from the University of Tokyo.

== Civil service career ==
Yokota joined the Ministry of Agriculture, Forestry and Fisheries (MAFF) in 1995. During her career she worked in a number of policy areas including agricultural administration, fisheries, food safety, and international food standards. She also served in the Ministry of Internal Affairs and Communications, the Ministry of Land, Infrastructure, Transport and Tourism, and the Cabinet Secretariat.

In 2021 she was appointed Vice Governor of Toyama Prefecture. In 2024 she became a Cabinet Councillor in the Cabinet Secretariat, including service in the Cabinet Bureau for Infectious Disease Crisis Management.

She became Vice Governor of Hiroshima Prefecture in April 2025.

== Governor of Hiroshima ==
In September 2025 Yokota announced her candidacy for Governor of Hiroshima as an independent, succeeding outgoing governor Hidehiko Yuzaki, who had decided not to seek another term.

She won the 2025 Hiroshima gubernatorial election held on 9 November 2025 and assumed office on 29 November. Her election made her the first woman to serve as Governor of Hiroshima Prefecture and the first female governor in Japan's Chūgoku region.

== Political positions ==
Yokota's public policy priorities have included support for agriculture, forestry, fisheries, rural revitalization, and measures to address Japan's population decline.

She has also advocated expanding opportunities for women in public life and reducing unconscious bias in workplaces and society, drawing on experience gained while serving as Vice Governor of Toyama Prefecture.

== Personal life ==
Yokota is married to Kazuaki Hashizume, a forestry official who has served in Japan's Forest Insurance Center.

== Electoral history ==
Election	Date	Party	Votes	Result
2025 Hiroshima gubernatorial election	9 November 2025	Independent	552,614	Elected

Preceded by Hidehiko Yuzaki	Governor of Hiroshima; 2025–	Succeeded by Incumbent
