= Kazuhiko Ōigawa =

Japanese politician

- 大井川 和彦
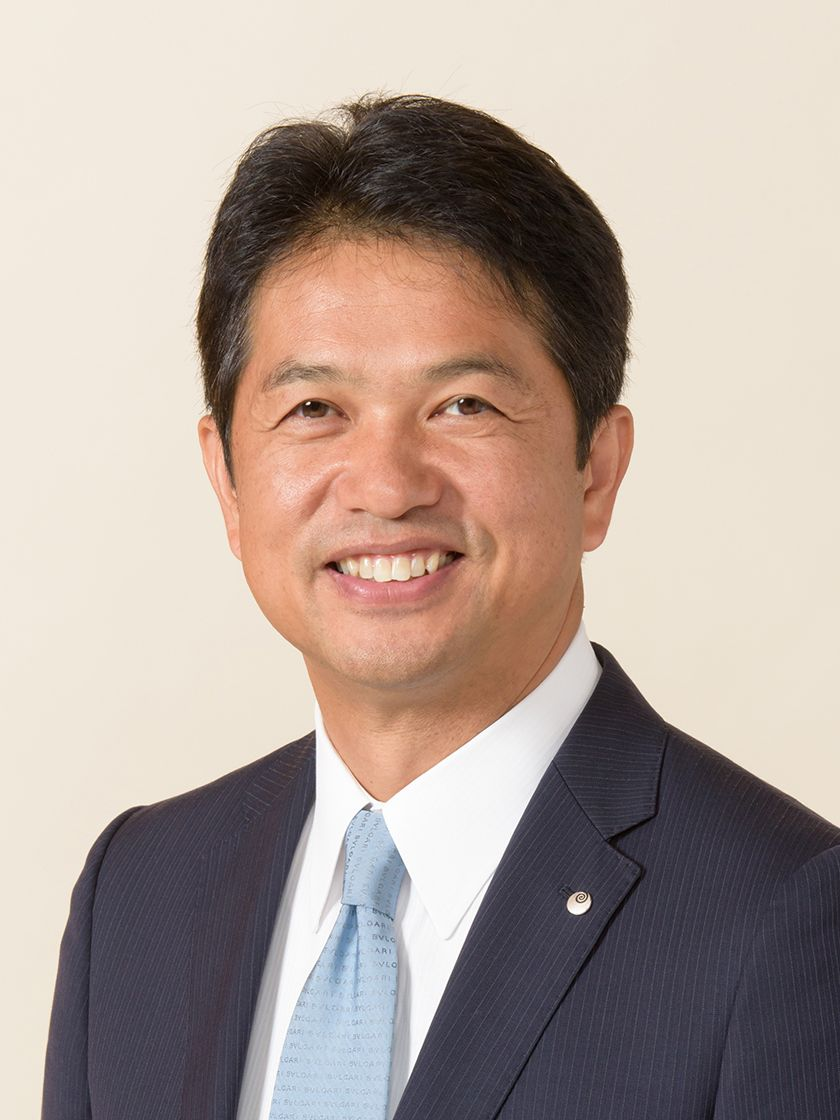
- Official portrait, 2017

Governor of Ibaraki Prefecture
- Incumbent
- Assumed office 26 September 2017
- Monarchs: Akihito; Naruhito
- Preceded by: Masaru Hashimoto

Personal details
- Born: 3 April 1964 (age 62) Tsuchiura, Ibaraki, Japan
- Party: Independent
- Education: University of Tokyo; University of Washington

Kazuhiko Ōigawa (大井川 和彦, Ōigawa Kazuhiko; born 3 April 1964) is a Japanese politician who serves as the current governor of Ibaraki Prefecture. A native of Tsuchiura and graduate of the Law School of the University of Tokyo, he entered the Ministry of International Trade and Industry (now Ministry of Economy, Trade and Industry) in 1988. After studying at University of Washington Law School in 1996, in 1998 he became the first head of the Singapore office for the Ministry of International Trade and Industry.

He left the Ministry of Economy, Trade and Industry in 2003, and from that same year he was a Microsoft Asia Executive Officer. After serving as Managing Executive Officer of Microsoft, he became Senior Managing Executive Officer of Cisco Systems from 2010 and in 2016, he was appointed as a director of Dwango, the company that manages Niconico Douga.

He was elected governor of Ibaraki prefecture in 2017 after defeating six-term incumbent Masaru Hashimoto in a three cornered race.

In July 2019, Ibaraki became the first prefecture to issue partnership certificates for lesbian, gay, bisexual and transgender couples. Announcing the reform, Gov. Ōigawa stated that ″This is a matter of human rights, and we must work swiftly in order to eliminate discrimination and prejudices″.

Preceded by Masaru Hashimoto	Governor of Ibaraki Prefecture; 2017–present	Incumbent
