= Norihisa Satake =

Japanese politician (born 1947)

- 佐竹 敬久

Governor of Akita Prefecture
- In office 20 April 2009 – 19 April 2025
- Monarchs: Akihito; Naruhito
- Preceded by: Sukeshiro Terata
- Succeeded by: Kenta Suzuki

Mayor of Akita
- In office 8 July 2001 – 24 February 2009
- Preceded by: Renjiro Ishikawa
- Succeeded by: Motomu Hozumi

Personal details
- Born: 15 November 1947 (age 78) Kakunodate, Akita, Japan
- Party: Independent
- Education: Tohoku University
- Profession: Engineer

Norihisa Satake (佐竹 敬久, Satake Norihisa; born 15 November 1947) is a Japanese politician. A former two-term mayor of Akita City in Akita Prefecture, first elected in 2001. He was the Governor of Akita Prefecture for four terms between 2009 and 2025. He is the 21st head of the North Satake branch of the Satake clan.

== Early life and family ==
Satake was born into the Wainai family, and his biological great grandfather was Wainai Sadayuki. He was later adopted to the North Satake family, a noble family that held the title of baron until 1945, when the nobility was abolished in Japan. The Satake family had formerly served as daimyo (feudal lord) of Kubota Domain. He is the 21st head of the North Satake family.

He is a native of Senboku, Akita, formerly known as Kakunodate Village in Senboku District. He graduated from Tohoku University in 1971, with a B.E. degree in Precision Engineering.

== Career ==
After graduating from Tohoku University, he joined the Akita Prefectural Office in 1972 and held a series of positions until 1997. In that year, he helped to establish the Regional Economic Research Council.

Later in July 2001, he won his first of two elections for the post of Mayor of Akita City. During his time in office, he was also the chairman and vice-chairman of the National Mayors Association of Japan and the Governmental Select Committee on Taxation.

While still Mayor of Akita City, he became a candidate for Governor of Akita Prefecture in February 2009. Though being a political independent, he earned the support of the local Liberal Democratic Party Alliance and the Social Democratic Party Alliance in Akita Prefecture. He won election for the post over several other candidates on April 12, 2009.

Fourth-term incumbent Takahisa Satake announced that he would not run after the last gubernatorial election, and the 2025 election became an election battle between newcomers.

== Personality ==
Satake has said to love cats. During his time as Mayor of Akita, he kept five cats at the official residence. He owns a Siberian cat named Mir, given to him by Russian president Vladimir Putin.

During his tenure as Governor of Akita Prefecture, he drew public attention for his remarks in response to protest calls regarding bear culling, reportedly saying, "I'll send bears to your place" and abruptly hanging up the phone. In a post-retirement interview, he explained that his stance was shaped by firsthand experiences witnessing victims whose faces had been severely injured by bears, and by the broader impact of bear-related incidents on local communities. He described the situation as akin to wartime conditions, stating, "This is war," in reference to the restrictions and fear that had come to define daily life in affected areas.
