= Governor (Japan) =

Highest executive of a Japanese prefecture

In Japan, the governor (知事, chiji) is the highest ranking executive of a prefecture.

The governor is directly elected for a four-year term. Governors are subject to recall referendums. In each prefecture, between one and four vice governors are appointed by the governor with the approval of the prefectural assembly. In the case of death, disability, or resignation of the governor, one of the vice governors becomes either governor or acting governor.

Candidates must be Japanese citizens and at least 30 years old.

== See also ==
- List of current Japanese governors
- List of governors by prefectures
- National Governors Association of Japan
