= Politics of Nagasaki Prefecture =

Politics of Nagasaki Prefecture, as in all prefectures of Japan, takes place in the framework of local autonomy that is guaranteed by the Constitution and laid out in the Local Autonomy Law. The administration is headed by a governor directly elected by the people every four years in first-past-the-post elections. Legislation, the budget and the approval of personnel appointments, including the vice governor, are handled by the prefectural assembly that is directly elected by the people every four years by single-non transferable vote.

With a population of less than 1.5 million in four counties and a total of 21 municipalities, Nagasaki is one of the smaller prefectures. Its fiscal strength index (zaiseiryoku shisū) was 0.30 in fiscal 2009 (rank 42 nationwide), it can cover less than a third of its calculated expenses with its own prefectural taxes.

== National representation ==
Nagasaki's delegation to the national Diet currently consists of four directly elected Representatives and two Councillors, electing one every three years. For the House of Representatives, the prefecture forms part of the Kyūshū proportional representation block.

As of August 2013, Nagasaki's directly elected members of the Diet are (not including Diet members who are from Nagasaki but were elected by proportional representation)

- in the House of Representatives
  - 1st district: Tsutomu Tomioka, Liberal Democrat
  - 2nd district: Kanji Katō, Liberal Democrat
  - 3rd district: Yaichi Tanigawa, Liberal Democrat
  - 4th district: Seigo Kitamura, Liberal Democrat
- in the House of Councillors (Nagasaki At-large district)
  - class of 2010: Genjirō Kaneko, Liberal Democrat
  - class of 2013: Yūichirō Koga, Liberal Democrat

== Governor ==
Nagasaki's current governor is former vice governor Hōdō Nakamura who was elected in the election of 2010 with support from his predecessor Genjirō Kaneko against Democratic supported Tsuyoshi Hashimoto and five other candidates. Nakamura was re-elected for a second term in 2014 against only one Communist challenger; turnout hit an all-time low. However, Shingo Ōishi elected head-to-head resulting vote against current governor on Nagasaki governor election on February 20, 2022.

Kuroiwa is the 8th elected governor since 1947. Past elected governors of Nagasaki:

1. Sōjirō Sugiyama, independent (JSP), 1 term, 1947–1951
2. Takejirō Nishioka, independent (conservative), 2 terms, 1951–1958, died in office, Nishioka's son was Representative, Councillor and gubernatorial candidate Takeo Nishioka,
3. Katsuya Satō, 3 terms, 1958–1970, Satō's son-in-law is former four-term governor of Kyōto Teiichi Aramaki,
4. Kan'ichi Kubo, independent (elected as one of several LDP supported candidates), 3 terms, 1970–1982, Kubo's daughter is Ikuko Nakao, former mayor of Gotō, Nagasaki,
5. Isamu Takada, 4 terms, 1982–1998,
6. Genjirō Kaneko, independent (LDP), 3 terms, 1998–2010, Kaneko's father was Iwazō Kaneko, Representative from Nagasaki and minister in two cabinets.
7. Hōdō Nakamura, 3 terms from March 2, 2010, to March 1, 2022.
8. Shingo Ōishi, elected new governor from March 2, 2022.

== Assembly ==
The Nagasaki Prefectural Assembly has currently 46 members. The number under the provisions of the Local Autonomy Law would be 52, but was reduced by prefectural regulations in 2003. Members are elected every four years in unified regional elections by single non-transferable vote (in single-member districts identical to first-past-the-post) in currently 16 electoral districts most of which correspond to the cities and counties of Nagasaki: Nagasaki city (14 members), Sasebo city and North Matsuura county (9), Shimabara city (2), Isahaya city (4), Ōmura city (3), Hirado city (1), Matsuura city (1), Tsushima city (1), Iki city (1), Gotō city (1), Saikai city (1), Unzen city (2), South Shimabara city (2), West Sonogi county (2), East Sonogi county (1) and South Matsuura county (1).

The most recent general election for the prefectural assembly took place in the unified elections of April 2011. The Liberal Democratic Party remained strongest party with 20 seats, the Democratic Party won 11. Three seats went to the Justice Party, two to the Social Democratic Party, one to the Japanese Communist Party and ten members were nominally independents.

As of April 1, 2014 the assembly was composed as follows:

Composition of the Nagasaki Prefectural Assembly
Parliamentary group	Seats
Jiyūminshutō・aikyō no kai ("Liberal Democratic Party/Love your hometown association")	23
Kaikaku 21・shinsei Nagasaki ("Reform 21/Rebirth Nagasaki", formed by Democrats, Social Democrats and independents)	17
Kōmeitō	3
Japanese Communist Party	1
Kaikaku 21・Gotō ("Reform 21 Gotō")	1
Total (1 vacant seat)	45

Since 2012, the president of the assembly is Toshikatsu Watanabe (Kaikaku21/shinsei, Nagasaki City electoral district, 3rd term), the vice-president is Kō Nakayama (Kaikaku21/shinsei, Nagasaki City, 4th term).
