= 2022 Nagasaki gubernatorial election =

Election for Governor of Nagasaki

← 2018	20 February 2022	2026 →
- Turnout: 47.83% ▲11.80%
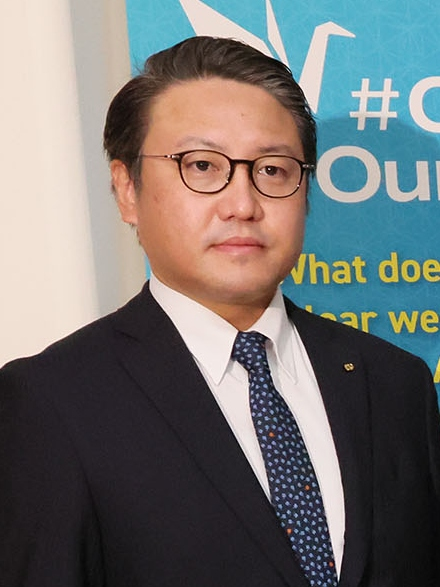

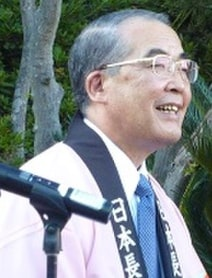
Nominee	Kengo Oishi	Hōdō Nakamura	Yoshihiko Miyazawa
Party	Independent	Independent	Independent
Popular vote	239,415	238,874	46,794
Percentage	45.60%	45.49%	8.91%
Supported by	Ishin; LDP - Prefectural	CDP; DPFP; LDP-Nakaumurite	JCP
- Results by municipality
Governor before election
Hōdō Nakamura
Independent
Elected Governor
Kengo Oishi
Independent

The 2022 Nagasaki gubernatorial election was a gubernatorial election held on 20 February 2022 to elect the next governor of Nagasaki (山口県, Nagasaki-ken), a prefecture of Japan in the north-west of Kyushu.

Three-term incumbent Hōdō Nakamura ran for re-election for a fourth four-year term, announcing his intentions on the final session of the Nagasaki Prefectural Assembly for 2021 on 21 December. Whether he would run was the subject of speculation and confusion, as he had made comments in late 2021 suggesting that he would not run and instead "pass the baton to the next leader". Nakamura had attempted to recruit a successor; but decided to run himself after those efforts fell through. LDP Nagasaki Prefectural Assembly Secretary-General Keisuke Yamamoto offered to run as a successor, but reportedly had policy disagreements with Nakamura, and decided not to run with Nakamura running. Nakaumura faced medical doctor Kengo Oishi and businessman Yoshihiko Miyazawa.

After previously endorsing Nakamura in 2010, 2014, and 2018, the prefectural Liberal Democratic Party federation instead voted to endorse the political newcomer Oishi in this election, due to dissatisfaction in Nakamura's governing. This caused a split in support amongst local LDP politicians, with two Nagasaki LDP Diet members and nearly half of the LDP's prefectural assembly members supporting Nakamura despite the federation's endorsement of Oishi.

Oishi narrowly defeated Nakamura by a margin of 541 votes (0.10%). He took office on 2 March. At 39 years old, Oishi became the youngest governor in Japan.

== Candidates ==
- Hōdō Nakamura, 71, incumbent since 2010, endorsed by half of prefectural assembly members of the LDP, the CDP and DPFP.
- Kengo Oishi, 39 year-old medical doctor, former Ministry of Health, Labor, and Welfare medical official, endorsed by the Ishin and the LDP’s prefectural chapter.
- Yoshihiko Miyazawa, 54 year-old business executive, endorsed by JCP.

Withdrew candidacy

- Hirohiko Terada, 60 year-old civic group representative
- Ryuji Tanaka, 78 year-old former Kobe University assistant professor

== Issues ==
Issues in the election included COVID-19-related policies amidst the pandemic, extending the then-upcoming Nishi Kyushu Shinkansen through Saga Prefecture, construction of the Ishiki Dam, and a potential integrated resort facility in the prefecture.

== Endorsements ==
Kengo Oishi

Cabinet members

- Genjirō Kaneko, Agriculture, Forestry, and Fisheries minister (2021–2022), House of Councillors member for Nagasaki at-large (2010–2022), Governor of Nagasaki Prefecture (1998–2010) (LDP)

National Diet members

- Yaichi Tanigawa, House of Representatives member for Nagasaki-3rd (2005–present) (LDP)

Nagasaki Prefectural Assembly members

- Keisuke Yamamoto, Nagasaki Prefectural Assembly member for Iki City (2011–2022), Secretary-General of LDP Nagasaki Prefectural Federation (LDP)

Political parties

- Japan Innovation Party Nagasaki Prefectural Federation
- Liberal Democratic Party Nagasaki Prefectural Federation

Organizations

- Nagasaki Medical Association
- Nagasaki Pharmaceutical Association
Hōdō Nakamura

National Diet members

- Ryusho Kato, House of Representatives member for Nagasaki-2nd (2021–present) (LDP)
- Seigo Kitamura, House of Representatives member for Nagasaki-4th (2000–2023), Regional Revitalization minister and Regulatory Reform minister (2019–2020) (LDP)

Nagasaki Prefectural Assembly members

- Toshiharu Yae, Nagasaki Prefectural Assembly member for Isahaya City (1987–2023), President of Nagasaki Prefectural Assembly (2003–2005, 2017–2018) (LDP)

Local municipality mayors

- Tomihisa Taue, Mayor of Nagasaki City (2007–2023)
- Norio Tomonaga, Mayor of Sasebo City (2007–2023)
- Ryuzaburo Furukawa, Mayor of Shimabara City (2012–present)
- Yukishige Ōkubo, Mayor of Isahaya City (2021–present), House of Councilors member for Nagasaki at-large (2007–2013)
- Hiroshi Sonoda, Mayor of Omura City (2015–present)
- Naruhiko Kuroda, Mayor of Hirado City (2009–present)
- Yoshiyasu Tomoda, Mayor of Matsuura City (2018–present)
- Naoki Hitakatsu, Mayor of Tsushima City (2016–present)
- Hirokazu Shirakawa, Mayor of Iki City (2008–present)
- Ichitaro Noguchi, Mayor of Gotō City (2012–present)
- Yasuhiko Sugisawa, Mayor of Saikai City (2017–present)
- Shuzaburo Kanazawa, Mayor of Unzen City (2013–present)
- Masahiro Matsumoto, Mayor of Minamishimabara City (2014–present)
- Shinichi Yoshida, Mayor of Nagayo Town (2012–present)
- Yoshinori Yoshida, Mayor of Togitsu Town (2011–present)
- Ichiro Okada, Mayor of Higashisonogi Town (2019–present)
- Fumio Yamaguchi, Mayor of Kawatana Town (2010–2022)
- Masata Ichinose, Mayor of Hasami Town (1998–2022)
- Hisayuki Nishimura, Mayor of Ojika Town (2019–present)
- Tsuyoshi Furusho, Mayor of Saza Town (2009–present)
- Nobuaki Ishida, Mayor of Shin-Kamigotō Town (2020–present)

Political parties

- Constitutional Democratic Party Nagasaki Prefectural Federation
- Democratic Party for the People Nagasaki Prefectural Federation

Organizations

- Japan Chamber of Commerce and Industry - 8 districts
- Nagasaki Association of City Mayors
- Nagasaki Association of Towns and Villages
- RENGO Nagasaki
- Nagasaki Federation of Agricultural Administration
Yoshihiko Miyazawa

Political parties

- Japanese Communist Party Nagasaki Prefectural Federation
Declined to endorse

Political parties

- Komeito Nagasaki Prefectural Federation
- Social Democratic Party Nagasaki Prefectural Federation

== Results ==
2022 Nagasaki gubernatorial election
Party	Candidate	Votes	%	±%
Independent (supported by Ishin, LDP (officially))	Kengo Oishi	239,415	45.60	N/A
Independent (supported by CDP, DPFP, LDP (faction))	Hōdō Nakamura (incumbent)	238,874	45.49	▼31.27
Independent (supported by JCP)	Yoshihiko Miyazawa	46,794	8.91	▼14.33
Turnout		529,162	47.83	▲11.80
Rejected ballots		4,073	0.77	
Registered electors		1,106,436		

Election results by municipality
Municipality	Kengo Oishi		Hōdō Nakamura		Yoshihiko Miyazawa	
Municipality	Votes	%	Votes	%	Votes	%
Total	239,415	45.60%	238,874	45.49%	46,794	8.91%
Nagasaki City	79,754	51.67%	58,688	38.02%	15,912	10.31%
Sasebo	40,629	47.45%	36,436	42.56%	8,552	9.99%
Shimabara	4,310	25.46%	11,451	67.63%	1,170	6.91%
Isahaya	22,886	43.24%	25,282	47.77%	4,761	9.00%
Omura	16,755	45.67%	16,282	44.38%	3,647	9.94%
Hirado	5,991	42.50%	7,135	50.62%	969	6.87%
Matsuura	3,719	41.55%	4,533	50.65%	698	7.80%
Tsushima	4,343	29.05%	9,983	66.78%	622	4.16%
Iki	5,029	41.58%	6,367	52.65%	698	5.77%
Goto	12,460	66.40%	5,650	30.11%	656	3.50%
Saikai	5,358	43.70%	5,976	48.74%	927	7.56%
Unzen	6,321	36.00%	10,310	58.72%	927	5.28%
Minamishimabara	4,330	21.59%	14,799	73.80%	925	4.61%
Nagayo	8,483	49.75%	6,635	38.91%	1,932	11.33%
Togitsu	5,483	50.38%	4,419	40.60%	981	9.01%
Higashisonogi	1,285	35.35%	1,943	53.45%	407	11.20%
Kawatana	1,815	32.81%	2,464	44.54%	1,253	22.65%
Hasami	2,241	36.94%	3,127	51.54%	699	11.52%
Ojika	427	27.57%	1,030	66.49%	92	5.94%
Saza	2,198	43.75%	2,321	46.20%	505	10.05%
Shinkamigoto	5,598	55.41%	4,043	40.02%	461	4.56%
