= 2018 Nagasaki gubernatorial election =

← 2014	04 February 2018	2022 →
- Turnout: 36.03% ▼4.69%
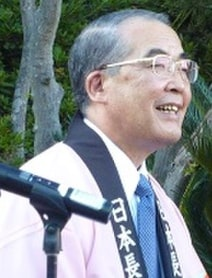
Nominee	Hōdō Nakamura	Toshihiko Haraguchi
Party	Independent	Japanese Communist Party
Popular vote	311,893	94,442
Percentage	76.8%	23.2%
Supported by	LDP, Komeito
Governor before election
Hōdō Nakamura
Independent
Elected Governor
Hōdō Nakamura
Independent

A gubernatorial election was held on 4 February 2018 to elect the next governor of the Nagasaki Prefecture. Incumbent Governor Hōdō Nakamura ran for a third consecutive term, challenged by Toshihiko Haraguchi from the Japanese Communist Party.

== Candidates ==
- Hōdō Nakamura, 67, incumbent since 2010, endorsed by LDP and Komeito.
- Toshihiko Haraguchi, 56, secretary-general of the JCP’s Nagasaki chapter.

== Campaign ==
While Haraguchi focused his campaign on welfare issues, Nakamura prioritized the creation of new jobs and the domestic migration from other Japanese prefectures. Subsequently, Nakamura came out victorious, securing his third term by receiving 76.8% of the votes.

== Results ==
Nagasaki gubernatorial election, 2018
Party	Candidate	Votes	%	±%
Independent	Hōdō Nakamura	311,893	76.76	▼4.82
JCP	Toshihiko Haraguchi	94,442	23.24	▲4.82
Total valid votes		406,335	98.20	
Rejected ballots		7,425	1.80	
Turnout		413,760	36.03%	▼4.69%
