= 2006 Nagasaki gubernatorial election =

← 2002	05 February 2006	2010 →
- Turnout: 52.27 ▲3.48
Governor before election
Genjiro Kaneko
LDP
Elected Governor
Genjiro Kaneko
LDP

A gubernatorial election was held on 5 February 2006 to elect the next governor of Nagasaki (山口県, Nagasaki-ken), a prefecture of Japan in the north-west of the island of Kyushu.

== Candidates ==
- Genjiro Kaneko, 61-year-old incumbent (first elected in 1998), endorsed by LDP, New Komeito and SDP.
- Noriko Kokubo, a 47-year-old company executive.
- Mitsuaki Yamashita, 53, chairman of the JCP's Nagasaki chapter.

== Results ==
Nagasaki gubernatorial 2006
Party	Candidate	Votes	%	±%
LDP	Genjiro Kaneko *	398,692	64.47	▼15.58
	Noriko Kokubo	188,154	30,43	n/a
JCP	Mitsuaki Yamashita	31,538	5,10	▼14.85
Turnout		624.460	52,27	▲3.48
Registered electors		1,194,755		
LDP hold		Swing	▼15.58	
