= Takemi =

Takemi (written: 武見) is a Japanese surname. Notable people with the surname include:

- Keizō Takemi (武見 敬三, born 1951), Japanese politician
- Taro Takemi (武見 太郎, 1904–1983), Japanese researcher, educator, inventor and scientist

Takemi (written: 岳巳 or 多恵美) is also a unisex Japanese given name. Notable people with the name include:

- Takemi Ise (伊勢 多恵美, born 1963), Japanese swimmer
- Takemi Miyamae (宮前 岳巳, born 1968), Japanese baseball coach

== Fictional Characters ==
- Takemi Aoba, a main character from manga Ultra B
- Tae Takemi, a character from the video game Persona 5
