= Morinosuke Chiwaki =

Morinosuke Chiwaki 血脇 守之助
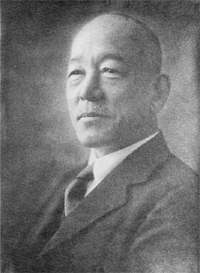
- Born: 2 March 1870; Minamisōma District, Chiba
- Died: 24 February 1947; Japan
- Education: Takayama Dental College (now Tokyo Dental College)
- Occupations: Dentist; Japan Dental Association president; Tokyo Dental College founder

Morinosuke Chiwaki (血脇 守之助, Chiwaki Morinosuke; 2 March 1870 – 24 February 1947) was a dentist and the Chairman of the Japan Dental Association.

He was one of the founders of Takayama Dental School (高山歯科医学院), which was later named Tokyo Dental College (東京歯科大学).

He was known as Hideyo Noguchi's patron.

There is a monument at his name in Abiko, Chiba.
