= JDA =

JDA may refer to:

- JDA Software, an American software and consultancy company
- JDA Dijon Basket or Jeanne d'Arc Dijon Basket, a French basketball club
- JDA Dijon Handball or Jeanne d'Arc Dijon Handball, a French handball club
- Janne Da Arc, a Japanese rock group
- Japan Defense Agency, the former name of the Japanese Ministry of Defense
- Japan Dental Association
- Japan Domestic Airlines
- Jersey Democratic Alliance
- Jerusalem Declaration on Antisemitism
- Jerusalem Development Authority
- Jimmie Don Aycock, an American politician who served in the Texas House of Representatives
- Grant County Regional Airport (IATA code) in John Day, Oregon
- Johannesburg Development Agency, South Africa
- Joint defense agreement, an extension of attorney-client privilege
- JDA, a quarterfinalist on the twelfth season of American Idol
