= Yōnosuke Kikuchi =

Japanese politician (1889–1983)

- 菊地 養之輔
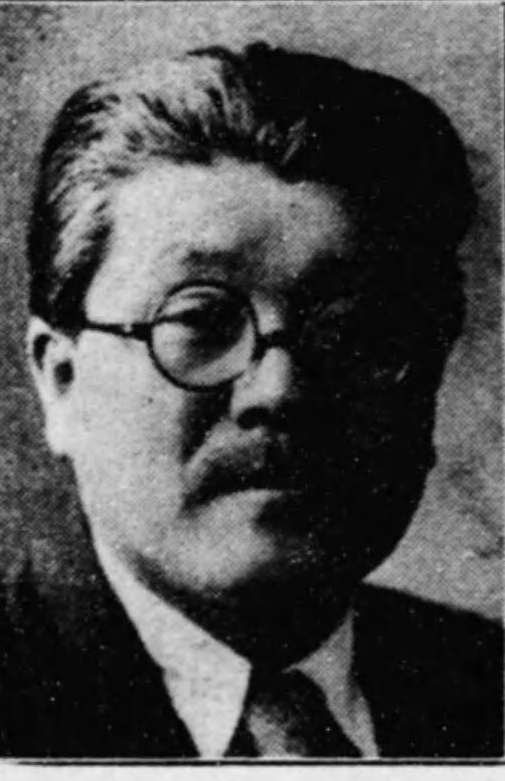
- Yōnosuke Kikuchi
- Born: September 5, 1889; Tamaura Village, Natori District, Miyagi Prefecture, Japan (now Iwanuma, Miyagi Prefecture)
- Died: January 5, 1983 (aged 93)
- Education: Chuo University Faculty of Law
- Occupations: Lawyer, Politician
- Known for: Contribution to the enactment of the post-war Constitution of Japan
- Political party: Japan Socialist Party (formerly Shakai Taishūtō and Miyagi Mass Party)
- Children: Kazutami Kikuchi (President of the Sendai Bar Association)
- Relatives: Taro Takemi (cousin-in-law); Yofu Otomo (cousin)
- Awards: Order of the Sacred Treasure, 2nd Class

Yōnosuke Kikuchi (菊地 養之輔, Kikuchi Yonosuke, September 5, 1889 – January 5, 1983) was a Japanese politician and lawyer. He served six terms as a member of the House of Representatives for Miyagi Prefecture, was a key figure in the Japan Socialist Party, and served as Vice President of the Japan Federation of Bar Associations (Nichibenren). He was also President of the Miyagi Prefecture Branch of the Japan-China Friendship Association. He received honorary citizenship from both Sendai and Iwanuma.

== Life ==
Kikuchi was born on September 5, 1889, in Tamaura Village, Natori District, Miyagi Prefecture (present-day Iwamuma, Miyagi Prefecture). He graduated from the Faculty of Law at Chuo University in 1914.

In 1921, he passed the bar examination and opened a law office in Sendai in 1922. His son, Kazutami Kikuchi, later served as President of the Sendai Bar Association.

While practicing law, Kikuchi became involved in social movements, advocating for workers and farmers. In 1929, he founded the Miyagi Mass Party and was elected its executive committee chairman. He ran unsuccessfully in the 1930 general election as a candidate of the Miyagi Mass Party. In 1931, he was elected to the Miyagi Prefectural Assembly, serving two terms. In the 1937 general election, he ran for the Shakai Taishūtō and won his first seat in the House of Representatives. He was subsequently elected six times in total.

During the Second Sino-Japanese War, he was dispatched to Manchukuo to visit and encourage Japanese troops. In 1942, he became President of the Sendai Bar Association.

After World War II, Kikuchi participated in the founding of the Japan Socialist Party in 1945. He served as a party advisor, Central Executive Committee member, and President of the Miyagi Prefectural Federation, becoming a leading figure ("heavyweight") in the party. Following the 1946 general election, he was appointed deputy chairman of the Special Committee on Constitutional Revision in the House of Representatives and played a significant role in the enactment of the Constitution of Japan. Shortly afterward, he was purged from public office due to his prior affiliation with the East Asia League.

After his purge was lifted, Kikuchi was appointed Vice President of the Japan Federation of Bar Associations (Nichibenren) in 1953. Over a 55-year legal career, he held positions such as human rights commissioner of Nichibenren and President of the Tohoku Bar Association Federation, contributing extensively to human rights protection. He also served as President of the Miyagi Prefecture Branch of the Japan-China Friendship Association, promoting friendly relations between Japan and China.

Kikuchi was an admirer of the poet Ishikawa Takuboku and composed his own tanka poems. In 1974, a monument inscribed with one of his poems was erected in Nishi Park, Sendai, through the efforts of a committee including Ichiriki Jiro and others. The poem reads:

"For a new world,
I shall become a servant
tying shoelaces."

The verse reflects his resolve to rebuild organizations after repeated suppressions, including the March 15 Incident (1928) and April 16 Incident (1929).

Kikuchi died on January 5, 1983, at the age of 93.

== Honors ==
- Honorary Citizen of Iwamuma (then Iwamuma Town) – 1967
- Order of the Sacred Treasure, 2nd Class – 1967
- Honorary Citizen of Sendai – 1977
- Senior Fourth Rank (posthumous) – 1983
