= Ken Hirata =

Japanese politician (born 1967)

- 平田 研
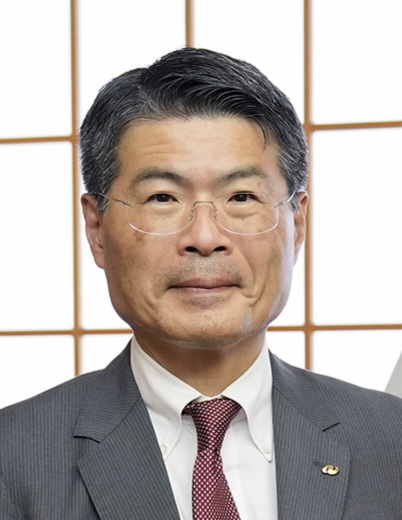
- Hirata in 2026

Governor of Nagasaki Prefecture
- Incumbent
- Assumed office 2 March 2026
- Monarch: Naruhito
- Preceded by: Kengo Oishi

Personal details
- Born: 20 October 1967 (age 58) Nagasaki, Japan
- Party: Independent
- Education: University of Tokyo

Ken Hirata (平田 研, Hirata Ken; born 20 October 1967) is a Japanese politician elected as the governor of Nagasaki Prefecture in the 2026 Nagasaki gubernatorial election.

== Early life ==
Hirata graduated from Nagasaki Minami High School and then attended University of Tokyo. He graduated from the Faculty of Law in 1991 and joined the Ministry of Construction the same year.

== Political career ==
He was appointed as a vice-governor for Nagasaki Prefecture in by Hōdō Nakamura in 2018 until 2022. He was reappointed in 2022 by Kengo Oishi and served until 2023 when he was replaced by Nagasaki Prefecture's first female vice-governor. He ran for election in 2026 as an independent and defeated the incumbent Kengo Oishi.
