= Journal of Ethology =

Peer-reviewed scientific journal

- Discipline: Ethology
- Language: English
- Edited by: Takeshi Takegaki

Publication details
- History: 1983-present
- Publisher: Springer Science+Business Media on behalf of the Japan Ethological Society
- Frequency: Triannually
- Open access: Hybrid
- Impact factor: 1.202 (2021)

Standard abbreviations
- ISO 4: J. Ethol.

Indexing
- CODEN: JOETE8
- ISSN: 0289-0771 (print); 1439-5444 (web)
- LCCN: sn85060967
- OCLC no.: 936935536

Links
- Journal homepage; Online archive

The Journal of Ethology is a peer-reviewed scientific journal covering all aspects of ethology. It is published by Springer Science+Business Media on behalf of the Japan Ethological Society and was established in 1983 as a bilingual journal in English and Japanese. Initially, the journal focused on research conducted in Japan, but it has since expanded to include submissions from around the world and nowadays publishes in English only. The editor-in-chief is Takeshi Takegaki (Nagasaki University).

The journal publishes research articles, reviews, and commentaries related to the behavior of animals in their natural environment, as well as research conducted in laboratory settings.

== Abstracting and indexing ==
The journal is abstracted and indexed in:

- Aquatic Sciences and Fisheries Abstracts
- Biological Abstracts
- BIOSIS Previews
- CAB Abstracts
- Current Contents/Agriculture, Biology and Environmental Sciences
- EBSCO databases
- ProQuest databases
- Science Citation Index Expanded
- Scopus
- The Zoological Record

According to the Journal Citation Reports, the journal has a 2021 impact factor of 1.202.
