= Nichii =

Nichii may refer to:

- A former Japanese retail chain, renamed MYCAL (jp) in 1988, later absorbed into Aeon
- The shortened form for Japan Medical Association
- The shortened form for Nippon Medical School
