= 2002 Nagasaki gubernatorial election =

← 1998	3 February 2002	2006 →
- Turnout: 49,79
Governor before election
Genjiro Kaneko
LDP
Elected Governor
Genjiro Kaneko
LDP

A gubernatorial election was held on 3 February 2002 to elect the next governor of Nagasaki (山口県, Nagasaki-ken), a prefecture of Japan in the north-west of the island of Kyushu.

== Candidates ==
- Genjiro Kaneko, former representative, first elected in 1998, endorsed by LDP.
- Akira Takamura, for the JCP.

== Results ==
Nagasaki gubernatorial 2002
Party	Candidate	Votes	%	±%
LDP	Genjiro Kaneko *	468,099	80.05	
JCP	Akira Takamura	116,644	19,95	
Turnout		593.933	49,79	
Registered electors		1,192,771		
LDP hold		Swing		
