= Windell Rivera =

Windell L. Rivera
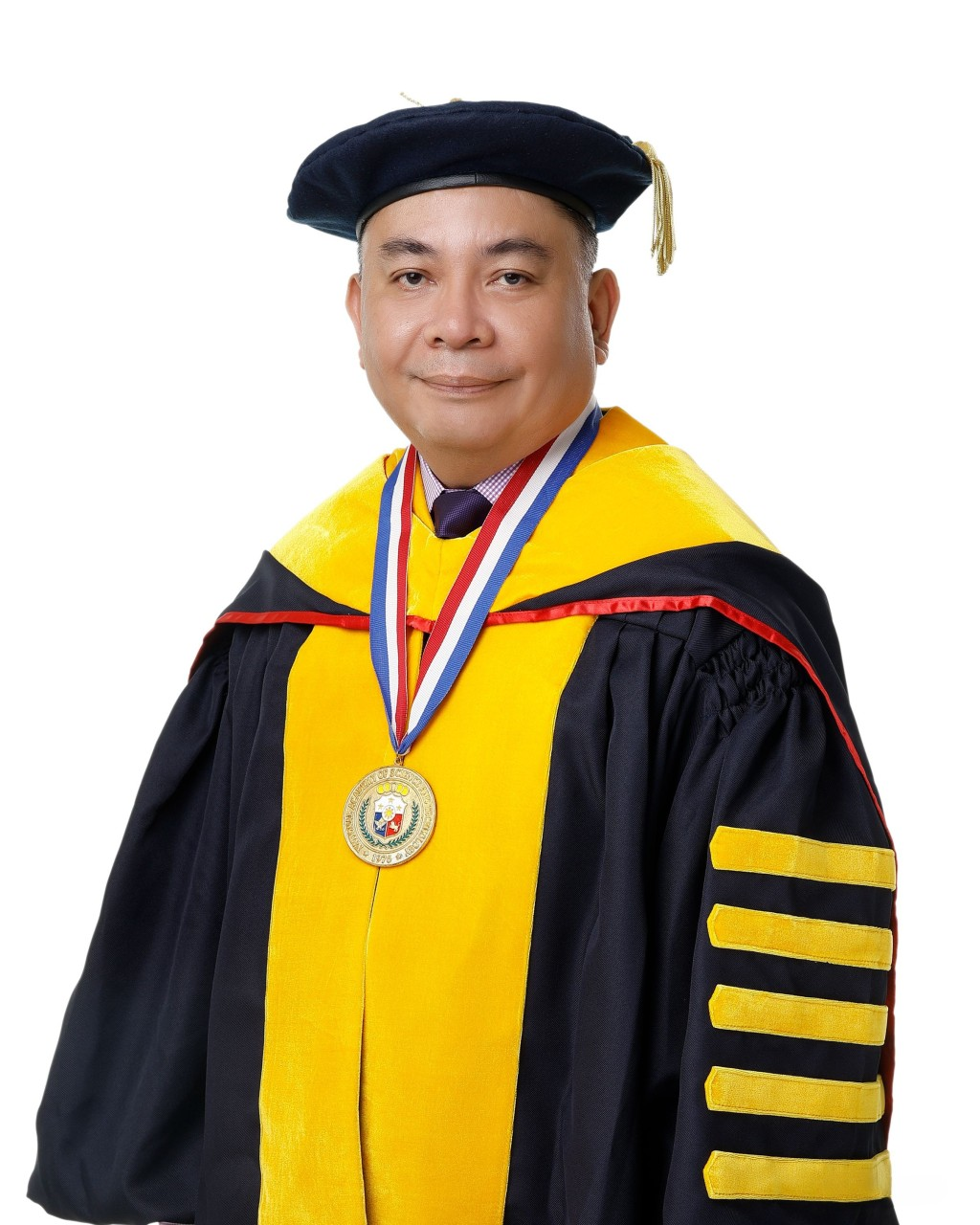
- Born: Philippines
- Occupations: Microbiologist and academic

Academic background
- Education: B.S., Biology (Microbiology); M.S., Microbiology; Ph.D., Medical Science (Cellular and Molecular Microbiology)
- Alma mater: University of the Philippines Los Baños; University of the Philippines Diliman; Nagasaki University School of Medicine, Japan

Academic work
- Institutions: University of the Philippines Diliman; National Academy of Science and Technology

Windell L Rivera is a Filipino microbiologist and an academic. He is a Professor of Microbiology at the Institute of Biology, College of Science, University of the Philippines Diliman.

Rivera is most known for his research in protozoology and microbiology. Through his works, he has contributed baseline data on various protozoans and disease-causing microorganisms, including the molecular characterization of protozoan pathogens such as Entamoeba species, Trichomonas vaginalis, Cryptosporidium, Acanthamoeba, Blastocystis and bacterial pathogens such as Salmonella, Leptospira, and Escherichia coli. His works have been published in academic journals, including American Journal of Tropical Medicine and Hygiene, Parasitology Research, Frontiers in Microbiology, and Heliyon. Additionally, he was listed among the top 2% of the World's Researchers in 2020 and 2023 and Asian Scientist 100 list in 2017.

== Education ==
Rivera completed his B.S. in Biology (Microbiology) from the University of the Philippines Los Baños in 1989. In 1995, he obtained his M.S. in Microbiology (Biomedical Microbiology) from the University of the Philippines Diliman. Later, in 1999, he earned his Ph.D. in Medical Science (Cellular and Molecular Microbiology) from Nagasaki University School of Medicine.

== Career ==
Rivera is an Academician at the National Academy of Science and Technology, Philippines (NAST PHL). He also holds appointments at professional institutions, including Co-Editor of the journal SciEnggJ and Chair of the Biological Sciences Division at the NAST PHL for the term 2022 to 2025. Additionally, he has been elected Chair of the Microbiology Consortium of the Philippines for the term 2023 to 2026. Furthermore, he is the President of Phi Sigma Biological Sciences Honor Society (Alpha Chi Chapter) for the term 2023 to 2026 and the vice-president of the Philippine Society of Parasitology for the term 2023 to 2025.

== Works ==
Rivera holds patent to a novel, cost-effective diagnostic kit that uses salivary IgA concentrations to detect Entamoeba histolytica with high sensitivity and specificity, facilitating large-scale epidemiological studies and improved management of amebiasis.

== Research ==
Rivera has authored research papers in various fields, including protozoology, applied bacteriology, and medical biotechnology. In 1998, he co-authored a paper with H Tachibana and others. The paper examined the prevalence, age, sex distribution, and geographical clustering of Entamoeba histolytica and E. dispar in the northern Philippines using PCR on formalin-fixed stool samples, highlighting higher E. dispar prevalence and the method's epidemiological sensitivity. While exploring genetic diversity within Blastocystis isolates from humans, pigs, and chickens in the Philippines, his 2005 study revealed distinct patterns among isolates from different hosts, while also indicating genetic similarity within each host group and suggesting the potential for zoonotic transmission based on the presence of a zoonotic strain. In related research, he explored the genetic diversity and cross-transmissibility of Blastocystis species in the Philippines, analyzing isolates from both animal and human hosts, demonstrating high similarity among sequences. The study also classified them into four distinct subtypes, and suggested low host-specificity and potential zoonotic transmission of the parasite.

In later career, Rivera's research has focused on two key areas. First, he investigated Salmonella contamination in retail meats from Metro Manila. Using molecular serotyping, he identified various serotypes and proposed this method as a more efficient alternative for Salmonella surveillance in the Philippines. In 2022, he further analyzed the distribution and associations of virulence genes in Salmonella isolates from various animal sources in Metro Manila. His findings revealed significant associations between these genes, with their prevalence influenced by serogroups, animal sources, and locations. The second focus of his research is microbial source tracking in Laguna Lake, the largest inland lake in the Philippines. In this regard, he published a paper in 2021, wherein he examined Cryptosporidium contamination in the lake and its tributaries, identifying sources of fecal pollution from human sewage and livestock. He highlighted the need for improved pollution control to mitigate health risks. Later in the same year, he proposed a method for enhancing fecal contamination monitoring in Laguna Lake using a DNA fingerprinting library and Random Forest statistical analysis to accurately identify and track sources of Escherichia coli pollution.

== Awards and honors ==
- 2006 – Outstanding Young Scientist, National Academy of Science and Technology, Philippines
- 2006 – The Outstanding Young Men (Science and Technology), JCI Philippines
- 2009 – Outstanding Microbiologist, Philippine Society for Microbiology, Inc.
- 2010 – NRCP Achievement Award in the Biological Sciences, National Research Council of the Philippines
- 2010 – NAST-LELEDFI Award for Outstanding Research in Tropical Medicine, National Academy of Science and Technology, Philippines
- 2015 – Eduardo A. Quisumbing Outstanding Research and Development Award for Basic Research, Department of Science and Technology, Philippines

== Bibliography ==
=== Books ===
- Methods in Microalgal Studies. (2020)

=== Selected articles ===
- Rivera, W. L., Tachibana, H., & Kanbara, H. (1998). Field study on the distribution of Entamoeba histolytica and Entamoeba dispar in the northern Philippines as detected by the polymerase chain reaction. American Journal of Tropical Medicine and Hygiene, 59(6), 916–921.
- Rivera, W.L. (2008). Phylogenetic analysis of Blastocystis isolates from animal and human hosts in the Philippines. Veterinary Parasitology, 156: 178–182.
- Rivera, W.L., Justo, C.A.C., Relucio-San Diego, M.A.C.V., Loyola, L.M. (2017). Detection and molecular characterization of double-stranded RNA viruses in Philippine Trichomonas vaginalis isolates. Journal of Microbiology, Immunology and Infection, 50: 669–676.
- Taganna, J. C., Quanico, J. P., Perono, R. M. G., Amor, E. C., & Rivera, W. L. (2011). Tannin-rich fraction from Terminalia catappa inhibits quorum sensing (QS) in Chromobacterium violaceum and the QS-controlled biofilm maturation and LasA staphylolytic activity in Pseudomonas aeruginosa. Journal of Ethnopharmacology, 134(3), 865–871.
- Mora, J.F.B., Meclat, Y.V.B., Calayag, A.M.B., Campino, S., Hafalla, J.C.R., Hibberd, M.L., Phelan, J.E., Clark, T.G., Rivera, W.L. (2024). Genomic analysis of Salmonella enterica from Metropolitan Manila abattoirs and markets reveals insights into circulating virulence and antimicrobial resistance genotypes. Frontiers in Microbiology. 14: 1304283.
