= Tadashi Inuzuka =

Japanese politician (born 1954)

- 犬塚 直史
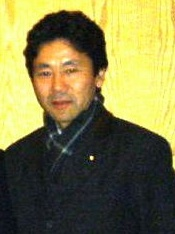
- Inuzuka in 2005

Member of the House of Councillors
- In office 26 July 2004 – 25 July 2010
- Preceded by: Sōichirō Matsutani
- Succeeded by: Genjirō Kaneko
- Constituency: Nagasaki at-large

Personal details
- Born: 28 September 1954 (age 71) Taitō, Tokyo, Japan
- Party: CDP (since 2020)
- Other political affiliations: DPJ (2000–2012); DPP (2019–2020)
- Education: Rikkyo University

Tadashi Inuzuka (犬塚 直史, Inuzuka Tadashi; born September 28, 1954) is a Japanese politician of the Democratic Party of Japan, a former Senator in the House of Councillors of the Diet (national legislature). A native of Tokyo, he graduated from Rikkyo University and received a master's degree from the University of Dallas in the United States. He was elected for the first time in 2004 from his Nagasaki constituency.

== Early life and education ==
In 1977, Senator Inuzuka graduated from Rikkyo University in Tokyo, Japan where he obtained a bachelor's degree in Business Administration. He also obtained an MBA from University of Dallas Graduate School of Management.

Before entering the political sphere, Inuzuka worked for the ALC publishing company. To this day, writing remains a great passion and in June 2010, he published his first book 脱主権国家への挑戦 about his political experience and policy.

== Business career ==
Inuzuka is the president of a Japan-Hawaii based hotel and real-estate company; he has also opened and operated restaurants in Tokyo. Most recently, he ran the Okushiga-Kogen Ski Resort in Nagano. Inuzuka is also a founding member of Doctors of the World Japan.

== Political career ==
In 2000, Inuzuka was selected as a candidate by the Democratic Party of Japan to run for a seat in the House of Representative from the Nagasaki constituency. In 2004, he was elected to the House of Councillors (equivalent to the Senate in the United States) in the National Diet of Japan. His campaign goals were 1) to ensure that Japan ratify the International Criminal Court (ICC) 2) to advocate for those still suffering from the atomic bomb's radioactive effects 3) that Nagasaki focus on reinvesting in the local community's businesses as opposed to building wasteful infrastructure. Inuzuka argues that long run effects of inefficient construction projects are detrimental as they only solve the short term unemployment problem instead of creating a long-term sustainable solution that reinvesting in local businesses can provide. He has suggested that the government provide a "Nagasaki Fund"—a microfinance mechanism to invest in small businesses so that the local community may grow together. The unemployment rate will go down as the private sector regains its economic foothold through effective micro financing.

Placing human security in the center of his policy scheme, Inuzuka aims to build a new post-Cold War framework for global peace and security. Accordingly, he has thrived in his campaign for Japan's accession to the International Criminal Court or ICC. After three years of aggressive campaigning in the Diet, Inuzuka managed to become one of the leading forces behind Japan's accession to the ICC on July 17, 2007, incidentally on the World Day for International Justice, exactly nine years from the adoption of the Rome Statute of the International Criminal Court.

Following his success in the ICC campaign, Inuzuka is now a strong advocate for the establishment of the proposed UN Emergency Peace Service or UNEPS, which is a permanent emergency response service designed to supplement the U.N.’s capacity to provide stability, peace, and relief in humanitarian crisis situations. Being a strong advocate for peace and stability, Inuzuka supports the central idea of UNEPS that it will be composed of willing individuals who work directly under the auspices of the Security Council and not of military troops from contributing states.

=== Party posts ===
- Vice Minister of Foreign Affairs of the Next Cabinet, 2nd Ozawa Cabinet

=== Committee posts ===
- Director, Special Committee on Official Development Assistance and Related Matters
- Director, Member, Committee on Foreign Affairs and Defence
- Director, Committee on Budget

=== Social posts ===
Inuzuka holds several social posts besides his career as Senator in the House of Councillors of the Japanese Diet.

- Board Member and Deputy Convenor of the International Law and Human Rights Programme, Parliamentarians for Global Action
- Founding member, Medécins Du Monde
- Board member, PlaNet Finance
- Board member, World Federalist Movement/Institute for Global Policy

== See also ==
- Human security
- Responsibility to protect
- International Criminal Court

House of Councillors
Preceded by Sōichirō Matsutani	Councillor for Nagasaki (Class of 1950/1956/...); 2004–2010	Succeeded by Genjirō Kaneko
