= 2010 Nagasaki gubernatorial election =

- 21 February 2010
- Turnout: 60.08 ▲7.81
Governor before election
Genjiro Kaneko
LDP
Elected Governor
Hodo Nakamura
LDP

A gubernatorial election was held on 21 February 2010 to elect the next governor of Nagasaki (山口県, Nagasaki-ken), a prefecture of Japan in northwestern area of the island of Kyushu.

== Candidates ==
Genjiro Kaneko was the 65-year-old incumbent. He was first elected in 1998, but decided to retire and supported his vice-governor Hōdō Nakamura.

The candidates were:

- Hōdō Nakamura, vice-governor, endorsed by LDP and Komeito.
- Tsuyoshi Hashimoto, endorsed by DPJ, PNP and SDP.
- Atsushi Ōnita, 52, professional wrestler, former member of the House of Councillors for the LDP.
- Reiko Oshibuchi.
- Takao Fukamachi, supported by the JCP.
- Masahiko Yamada, dissident of DPJ.
- Mitsuyuki Matsushita.

== Results ==
Nagasaki gubernatorial 2010
Party	Candidate	Votes	%	±%
LDP	Hōdō Nakamura	316,603	45.29	▼21.18
Democratic	Tsuyoshi Hashimoto	222,565	31,84	n/a
	Atsushi Ōnita	98,200	14,05	n/a
	Reiko Oshibuchi	30,902	4,42	n/a
JCP	Takao Fukamachi	21,291	3,05	▼2.05
Democratic	Masahiko Yamada	6,634	0,95	n/a
	Mitsuyuki Matsushita	2,889	0,41	n/a
Turnout		705.465	60,08	▲7.81
Registered electors		1,174,280		
LDP hold		Swing	▼21.18	
