= JMA Journal =

- Discipline: Medicine
- Language: English
- Edited by: Mari Michinaga

Publication details
- Former name: Japan Medical Association Journal
- History: 1958–2016; 2018–present
- Publisher: Japan Medical Association (Japan)
- Frequency: Quarterly (from 2015)
- Open access: yes

Standard abbreviations
- ISO 4: JMA J.

Indexing
- ISSN: 1346-8650

Links
- Journal homepage

The JMA Journal is a quarterly general medical journal. The journal was first published in 1958 as the Asian Medical Journal, and from 2001 to 2016 known as Japan Medical Association Journal. The journal ceased operation in 2017, resuming one year later in 2018 under the current title. Originally published by Japan Medical Publishing Inc., the journal is now owned and published by the Japan Medical Association.

JMAJ publishes by author invitation only, original research articles, review articles ("seminars" and "reviews"), editorials, book reviews, correspondence, as well as news features and case reports. The journal publishes invited articles and does not accept unsolicited submissions. The current (2017) editor-in-chief is Mari Michinaga.

JMAJ also reports news related to the Japan Medical Association's international engagement, including regional World Medical Association (WMA) projects, and Confederation of Medical Associations in Asia and Oceania (CMAAO) activities.

== History ==
Japan Medical Publishers (JMP) Inc (日本医事新報社, Nihon Iji Shinpo Sha)., had published medical research in Chinese and Japanese through the Japan Medical Journal (JMJ) (日本医事新報, Nihon iji shinpo) since 1921.

In 1958, JMP published the first issue of the Asian Medical Journal, an English language publication, to further medical research to Japan and the Asian region The first issue included a message from president of the Japan Red Cross Society, stating the ongoing human suffering caused by the atomic bombings of Hiroshima and Nagasaki, and that the knowledge published in the new journal, would hopefully help to bring an end to the severe burden of disease caused by acute radiation poisoning.

In 1960, the Japan Medical Association assumed editorial responsibility for the journal, and in 1984 took over the publication rights. The journal's title was changed to the Japan Medical Association Journal (JMAJ) in 2001. Since 2014 the JMAJ has been available through PubMed Central.

== Abstracting and indexing ==
The JMAJ is abstracted and indexed in the Science Citation Index, under the category for medicine, and with an h-index of 11.
