= Yukishige Okubo =

Japanese politician

- 大久保 潔重

Mayor of Isahaya
- Incumbent
- Assumed office 10 April 2021
- Preceded by: Akio Miyamoto

Member of the House of Councillors
- In office 29 July 2007 – 28 July 2013
- Preceded by: Tadashi Taura
- Succeeded by: Yūichirō Koga
- Constituency: Nagasaki at-large

Member of the Nagasaki Prefectural Assembly
- In office 2015–2021
- Constituency: Isahaya City
- In office 2006–2007
- Constituency: Isahaya City
- In office 2003–2005
- Constituency: Isahaya City

Personal details
- Born: 12 March 1966 (age 60) Isahaya, Nagasaki, Japan
- Party: Independent (2003–2005; 2015–present)
- Other political affiliations: Democratic (2005–2015)
- Education: Nagasaki University School of Dentistry
- Profession: Dentist

Yukishige Okubo (大久保 潔重, Ōkubo Yukishige; born March 12, 1966) is a Japanese politician of the Democratic Party of Japan, a member of the House of Councillors in the Diet (national legislature). A native of Isahaya, Nagasaki and graduate of Nagasaki University, he had served in the assembly of Nagasaki Prefecture since 2003. After running unsuccessfully for the House of Representatives in 2005, he was elected to the House of Councillors for the first time in 2007.

== Early life and education ==
Okubo was born in Isahaya City, Nagasaki Prefecture on 12 March 1966. He grew up there, attending and graduating from Isahaya Junior High and Isahaya High School. Soon after, he pursued a career in Dentistry, graduating from Nagasaki University's School of Dentistry in 1994. After working at several dental clinics around Tokyo and Kanagawa Prefecture, Okubo opened his own dental clinic in Fukuoka, Fukuoka Prefecture which he ran for several years.

== Political career ==
In 2002, Okubo attended and graduated from the first class of the Ichiro Ozawa Political School, and in the following year he ran for and was elected as an independent for the Nagasaki Prefectural Assembly in the Isahaya City district. In 2005, he resigned from his position in order to contest Nagasaki's 2nd district as a candidate for the Democratic Party in the 2005 general election, but was defeated by the Liberal Democratic incumbent representative Fumio Kyūma. As a result, he ran in and won the 2006 by-election for the Nagasaki Prefectural Assembly, though he would again resign from this position to be the Democratic Party candidate for the Nagasaki district in the 2007 House of Councillors election, managing to defeat the Liberal Democratic candidate Tadatoshi Komine and take the seat.

In 2009, he travelled to China as a member of the Ozawa delegation alongside 142 other Democratic Party members of the National Diet. In 2013, Okubo ran for re-election to the Nagasaki district, but was defeated by newcomer Yūichirō Koga by a wide margin. In the following year, Okuba again ran as a Democratic Party candidate for Nagasaki's 2nd District in the 2014 general election, but lost by over 20k votes to incumbent Liberal Democratic candidate Kanji Kato.

In 2015, Okuba ran for and won the Isahaya City seat in the Nagasaki Prefectural Assembly as an independent, and in 2019 he won his re-election to that same seat. However, on 15 January 2021, Okuba announced that he would be running that years Mayoral elections for his homecity of Ishihaya as an independent, eventually defeating incumbent mayor Akio Miyamoto (endorsed by the Liberal Democratic Party) and Takeshi Yamamura, a former employee of the Ministry of Land, Infrastructure, Transport and Tourism.

== Electoral history ==
2021 Isahaya City Mayoral Election
Party	Candidate	Votes	%	±%
Independent	Yukishige Okubo	22,714	35.1	
Independent	Akio Miyamoto (Incumbent) (Endorsed by the LDP)	21,167	32.7	
Independent	Takeshi Yamamura	20,880	32.2	

House of Councillors
Preceded by Tadashi Taura	Councillor for Nagasaki (Class of 1947/1953/...); 2007–present	Incumbent
