= Kōsei Katsuzaki =

Japanese baseball coach

Kōsei Katsuzaki 勝崎 耕世

Ryukyu Blue Oceans
- Conditioning Coach
- Born: September 8, 1965 (age 60); Aichi, Japan
- Bats: Right Throws: Right

Teams
- As Coach: Hokkaido Nippon Ham Fighters(1996–2003); Chunichi Dragons (2004–2011); Lotte Giants (2012); Chunichi Dragons (2014–2019); Ryukyu Blue Oceans (2020-present)

Kōsei Katsuzaki (勝崎 耕世, Katsuzaki Kōsei; born September 8, 1965 in Aichi, Japan) is a Japanese conditioning coach for the Chunichi Dragons in Japan's Nippon Professional Baseball.

== Career ==
Katsuzaki is a graduate of Miyoshi High School, Nippon Sport Science University and University of California, Los Angeles. He holds a PhD which he completed at Nippon Sport Science University.

From 1996-2003, Katsuzaki was training coach for the Hokkaido Nippon Ham Fighters.

When the Fighters moved to Hokkaido, Katsuzaki was offered a position with Hiromitsu Ochiai's staff at the Chunichi Dragons where he performed as conditioning coach between 2003 and 2011 overseeing several Central League pennant wins and a Japan Series win.

He was invited as a special coach at the Lotte Giants in the Korean Baseball Organisation and although he had a permanent role during the year, he left after spending a season with the team.

In 2014, he made a come back to the Dragons. On 4 October 2019, Katsuzaki left the Dragons by mutual consent.

In 2019, it was announced Katsuzaki had joined the backroom at NPB aspirant franchise, Ryukyu Blue Oceans.

== Personal ==
Katsuzaki is a published academic author previously writing on pitching motion, coordination in sport performance and pitching disorders.

In 2013, Katsuzaki published a DVD book on training methods to become better at baseball.

On 27 February 2017 while moving for an open game against the Hokkaido Nippon Ham Fighters, Katuzaki and fellow conditioning coach Takemi Miyamae rushed to the help of a man who had fainted at Naha Airport where they instructed staff and aided paramedics. Katsuzaki is qualified by the International Emergency Medical Association and is said to have helped many people in urgent help when he crosses them.
