= Japan Radioisotope Association =

- 日本アイソトープ協会
- Abbreviation: JRIA
- Formation: 1951
- Founder: Yoshio Nishina, Seiji Kaya, Taro Takemi
- Type: Professional association
- Purpose: Promoting the beneficial use of radioisotopes
- Headquarters: Bunkyo-ku, Tokyo, Japan
- Members: More than 3,500
- President: Akito Arima
- Staff: 137
- Website: www.jrias.or.jp/e/

The Japan Radioisotope Association (日本アイソトープ協会) (JRIA) is the oldest and largest professional association related to radioisotope and radiation research in Japan. The JRIA was made into a public utility corporation by the government of Japan. Founded in 1951, the JRIA now has more than 3,500 members.

Based in Tokyo, the JRIA's goal is to disseminate the technologies associated with radioisotope and radiation use and promote their safe handling. Its major activities include academic activities, supplying radioisotopes, labeled compounds and radiopharmaceuticals, and collecting and treating radioactive wastes.

The Nishina Memorial Cyclotron Center of JRIA is operated for cooperative research projects of all institutions in Japan. The Kaya Memorial Takizawa Laboratory of JRIA was established to treat all medical radioactive wastes.
