= Yuichiro Koga =

Japanese politician (born 1967)

- 古賀 友一郎
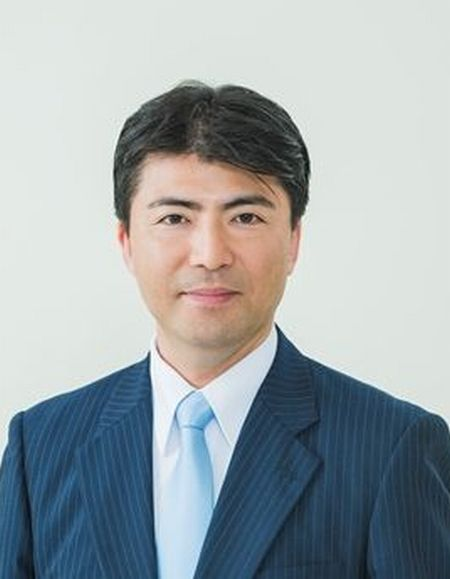
- Official portrait, 2018

Member of the House of Councillors
- Incumbent
- Assumed office 29 July 2013
- Preceded by: Yukishige Okubo
- Constituency: Nagasaki at-large

Personal details
- Born: 2 November 1967 (age 58) Isahaya, Nagasaki, Japan
- Party: Liberal Democratic
- Education: University of Tokyo

Yuichiro Koga (古賀友一郎, Koga Yuichiro; born 2 November 1967) is a Japanese politician serving as state minister of economy, trade and industry and state minister of the Cabinet Office since 2024. He has been a member of the House of Councillors since 2013.
