= 2014 Nagasaki gubernatorial election =

- 2 February 2014
- Turnout: 40.72 ▼19.36
Governor before election
Hōdō Nakamura
LDP
Elected Governor
Hōdō Nakamura
LDP

A Gubernatorial election was held on 2 February 2014 to elect the next governor of Nagasaki (山口県, Nagasaki-ken), a prefecture of Japan in the northwest of the island of Kyushu.

== Candidates ==
- Hōdō Nakamura, 63, incumbent since 2010, endorsed by LDP, Komeito, and DPJ.
- Toshihiko Haraguchi, 52, secretary-general of the JCP’s Nagasaki chapter.

== Results ==
Nagasaki gubernatorial 2014
Party	Candidate	Votes	%	±%
LDP	Hōdō Nakamura *	375,112	81.58	▲36.29
JCP	Toshihiko Haraguchi	84,704	18.42	▲15.37
Turnout		469.857	40,72	▼19.36
Registered electors		1,154,002		
LDP hold		Swing	▲36.29	
