= Japan Medical Association =

Japanese professional association

- 日本医師会

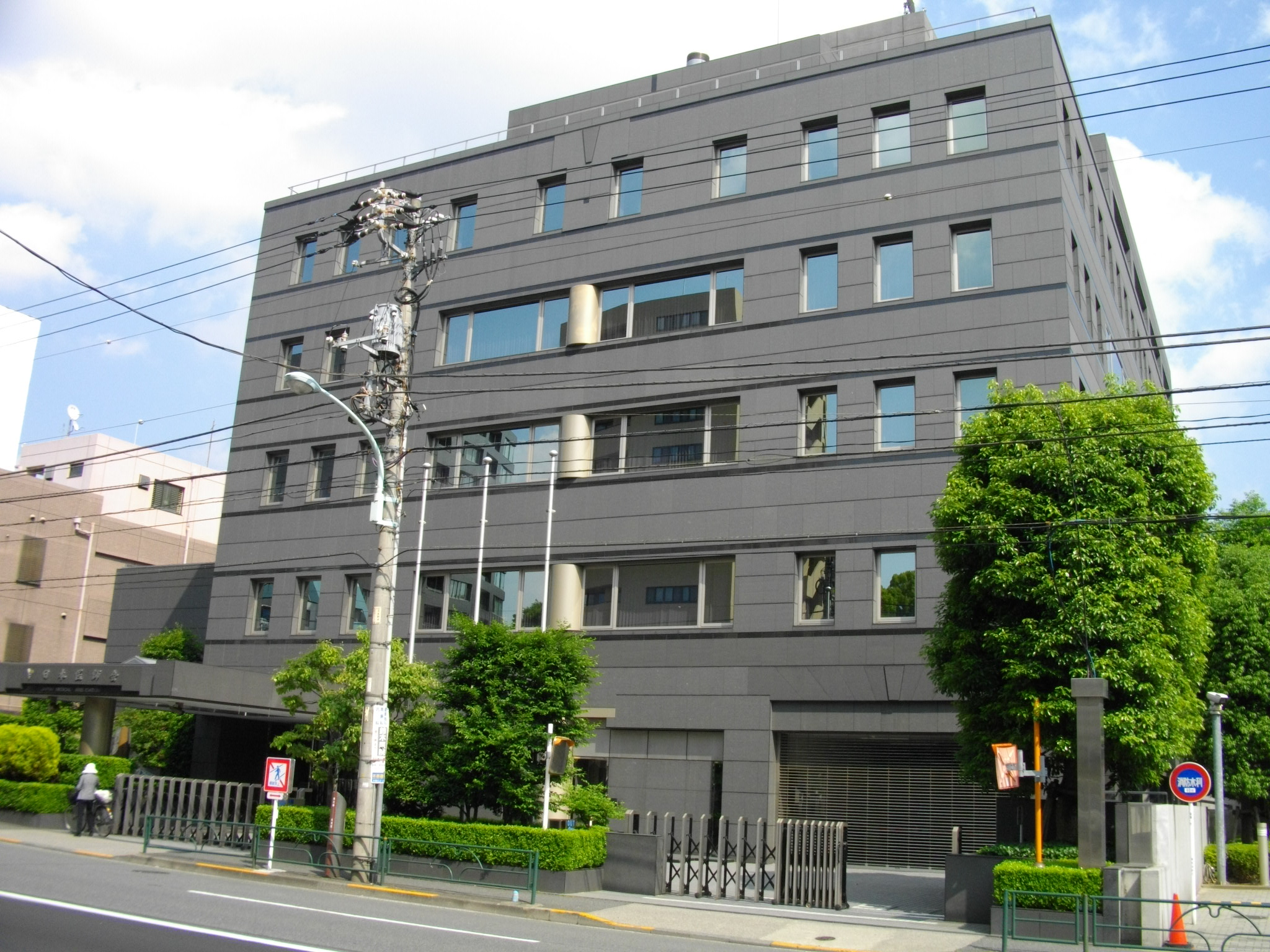
- JMA headquarters in Tokyo
- Abbreviation: JMA
- Formation: November 10, 1916; 109 years ago
- Founder: Kitasato Shibasaburo
- Type: Professional association
- Purpose: representing medical doctors
- Headquarters: Honkomagome, Bunkyō, Tokyo, Japan
- Members: 167,000
- Chairman: Kichiro Matusmoto
- Website: www.med.or.jp
- Formerly called: Greater Japan Medical Association

The Japan Medical Association (Japanese: 日本医師会, Hepburn: Nihon Ishi Kai) (also known as JMA or Nichii (日医)), is the largest professional association of licensed physicians in Japan. The JMA has been a member of the World Medical Association since 1951 and participates at all levels of the WMA. National headquarters are located in Honkomagome, Bunkyō, Tokyo, Japan, supplemented by prefectural branch offices and member associations in local communities.

== History ==
With the increasing introduction of western medicine, medical research and peer support among doctors developed during the Meiji period of the late 1800s. In 1879, medical practitioners who subscribed to the practice of kampo medicine (traditional Chinese medicine) began to organise themselves in response to Western medicine's growing presence in post-Meiji restoration Japan. Those physicians formed the Imperial Medical Association (帝国医会, Teikoku ikai) in 1890 to advocate for the practice of Chinese (kampo) medicine, but the IMA was dissolved in 1898.

As the medical profession continued to develop in line with Western scientific advances of the time, the public wanted to legally regulate medical organisations. In 1906, statutory procedures were implemented to organise professional association activities at the prefectural and local municipality levels, and to require physicians practicing medical services outside of the public hospitals system to join the member association branch in the locality where they practice medicine.

Regional medical associations had emerged during the period after 1906, but no national organisation existed to regulate the 30,000 medical doctors practicing outside the national university and Imperial armed forces hospital systems. An attempt to organise physicians on a national level was made under the name Japan Allied Medical Association (日本連合医師会, Nippon Rengō Ishikai) in 1914, but the association failed to enlist a sufficient number of prefectural-level medical associations.

On November 10, 1916, the Greater Japan Medical Association (大日本医師会, Dainippon Ishikai) was established by the Minister for Interior Affairs, and then later renamed the Japan Medical Association in 1923. The JMA required by law that all Japanese physicians practicing in clinics and hospitals outside the national and Imperial armed forces hospital system to join. During World War II, the JMA served as the sole national association responsible to maintain and improve clinical health for the Japanese public. During the post-war period the Japan Medical Association underwent reforms with direct intervention from the GHQ of the Supreme Commander for the Allied Powers. The most notable reform involved persons who had contributed to the war effort and who would no longer be permitted to accept executive appointments in the ongoing business of the association. Following this directive, Toshihiko Nakayama, the chairman of the association at the time, announced that he and others with similar positions would no longer hold offices in the association.

Without the demands of World War II on the medical fraternity, the association was able to refocus efforts on school, occupation, and community health in addition to standard clinical healthcare. On November 1, 1947, toward the end of the Allied occupation of Japan, the association recommenced operation under the name "Japan Medical Association" as a non-governmental organization, which previously had been under direct Imperial government control. The newly founded JMA had a constitution which was patterned after the American Medical Association, with voluntary membership, executive offices elected by popular vote, and association business to be conducted through democratic procedures. These activities led to the JMA being admitted to the World Medical Association in 1951. The JMA, in advocating for its members, has come into conflict with the Ministry of Welfare over amounts for medical fees.

The main activities of the JMA are to improve university medical education programs, promote and support medical research, provide professional development through continuing education to members, and collaborate with national and international governments on special clinical public healthcare projects such as disaster relief medicine.

== Membership advocacy and political lobbying ==
The JMA has been involved in political lobbying since its inception. The main areas of advocacy include protecting physicians' interests in clinical practice, public health related policy, clinical fee adjustments set by the national health insurance body, and legal procedures related to malpractice.

For a period of almost ten years, from 1947 to 1956, the association defended physicians' rights to prescribe, formulate, and sell medicine, which the government proposed to prevent through a parliamentary bill. The JMA argued that income for physicians under the health insurance system alone was not economically sustainable, and therefore was the need for physicians to compound and sell their own formulated medications. The JMA was successful in protecting this practice.

The JMA continues to lobby the government to adjust clinical fees derived from the national health insurance system, to be adjusted in line with the cost of living. Lobbying for financial accommodations related to administrating the universal health care system is also a regular area for advocacy.

Clinical malpractice has become a focus of the association, particularly how best to protect medical physicians in legal proceedings. As Kodate notes, while there has not yet been "the emergence of a new accountability regime, increased pressure is now placed on healthcare providers in terms of monitoring performances, collecting information and making decisions on how to act when serious incidents occur."

== National professional and public health programs ==
The Japan Medical Association maintains a number of public national public health systems, including the following:

- Center for Clinical Trials-Japan Medical Association (JMACCT)
  - Established in 2003, the JMACCT conducted large-scale clinical trials, including investigator-initiated trials (IIT), with support from the Japanese Ministry of Health Labour and Welfare.
- Japan Medical Association Team (JMAT)
  - Established in 2011, the specialist team of medical professionals are deployed during major natural disasters and public health incidents. In the event of an emergency, the Japanese government is responsible to respond during the first 72 hours. JMAT is responsible for the period following the first 72 hours. During a natural disaster, medical units are dispatched in groups of four, each group including one medical doctor, two nurses, and an administrative assistant. During the 2011 Tōhoku earthquake and tsunami, there were 1,393 teams, comprising 6,054 JMA members, deployed in response to the disaster.
- Japan Medical Association Certificate Authority
  - This entity issues PKI electronic identity and fraud proof physical identity credentials that are cybersecure to all licensed physicians. The physical identity cards were introduced for medical practitioners to easily identify themselves during national disasters, and to allow access rights to nationwide secure clinical research and educational facilities.
- Japan Medical Association ORCA Project
  - The Online Receipt Computer Advantage (ORCA) project is the national integrated electronic patient medical record branch of the JMA. ORCA is responsible for maintaining the records at approximately 15,000 clinics and hospitals.
- JAL Doctor
  - This is the Japan Medical Association and Japan Airlines initiative that automatically registers JMA-licensed physicians onto aircraft manifests. Air cabin crews can easily identify medical practitioners by seat number during inflight medical emergencies.
- Japan Medical Association Life-Long Education System (日本医師会生涯教育制度, Nihon Ishikai Shōgai Kyōiku Seido)
  - This is the Japan Medical Association online continuing medical education (CME) and professional development system for medical doctors. The CME Promotion Committee was established in 1984 as an advisory committee to the JMA and then officially launched in 1987. The JMA Medical Library, which holds specialist medical collections at universities, is administered through the continuing education system.
- Japan Medical Association Certified Sports Health Medical System (日本医師会認定健康スポーツ医制度, Nihon Ishikai Nintei Kenkō Supōtsu Iseido)
  - This is a specialist clinical endorsement for medical doctors working in sports medicine. The endorsement was introduced in 1991 and requires recertification every five years.
- Japan Medical Association Women Doctors Assistance Centre (日本医師会女性医師支援センター, Nihon Ishikai Jōsei Ishi Shien Sentā)
  - The JMA also supports women's health and female physicians through a specialist centre established in 2007 after receiving a directive from the Ministry of Health, Labour, and Welfare.

== Membership ==
As of 2015, there were approximately 167,000 members of the JMA organised under one of the forty-seven prefectural medical associations. Self-employed physicians make up the largest number of members, followed by hospital or small clinic-based physicians, and hospital residents.

=== Notable members ===
Shinya Yamanaka was co-awarded (with John B. Gurdon) the 2012 Nobel Prize for Physiology or Medicine for their work in proving that mature cells could be converted into stem cells. The result of the work of Yamanaka and Gurdon is considered to be a scientific milestone in human regenerative medicine.

Two past presidents of the JMA, Taro Takemi and Eitaka Tsuboi, have served as president of the World Medical Association. Tsuboi pioneered cancer research and treatment in Japan and Asia, self-funded school and community health programs in Nepal, and had a role in establishing the Thai National Cancer Centre in Bangkok. In 2000, King Birendra of Nepal, decorated Tsuboi for his long term contributions to Nepal.

JMA members have also served the WMA in many other executive roles including Chair of the WMA Council and vice-president.

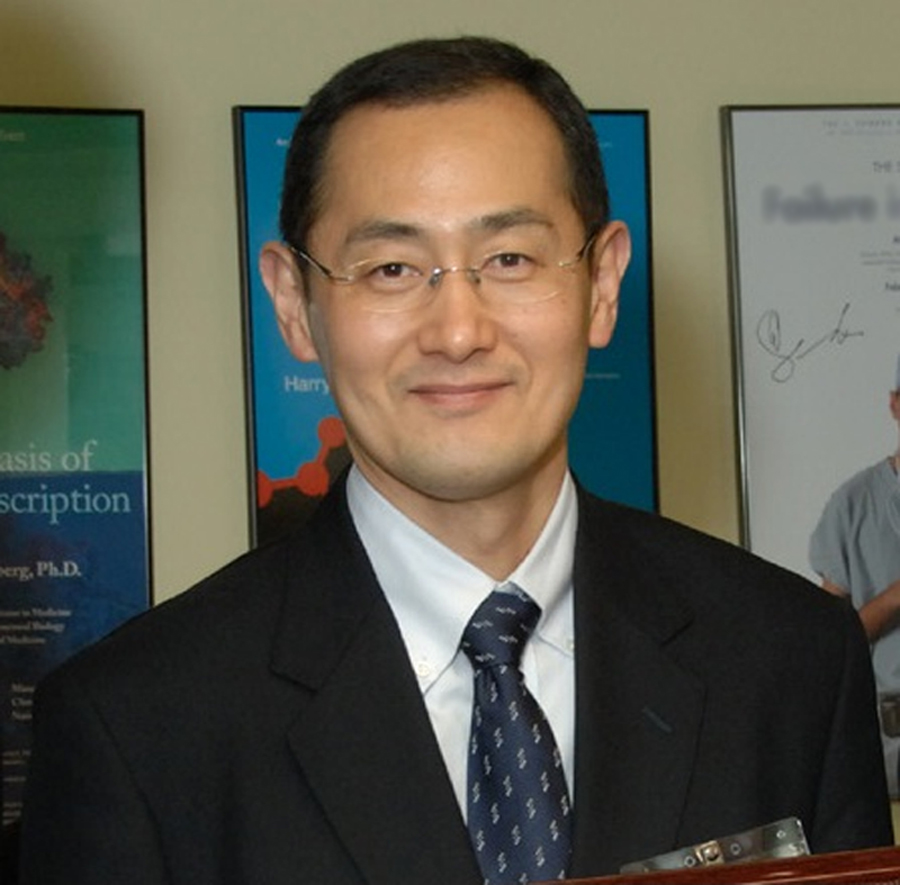
Dr. Shinya Yamanaka, Nobel laureate

Dr. Eitaka Tsuboi, past World Medical Association president

== Public broadcast and programming ==
The JMA produces a variety of medical related programming for the public and allied medical persons including but not limited to:

- Igaku Kōza (医学講座), a biweekly short wave radio program broadcast by Radio Nikkei since 1954, for allied health employees
- Nagano Sukenari no Iryōkai Kī Pāson ni Kiku (長野祐也の医療界キーパーソンに聞く), a radio program that broadcasts interviews with professionals from the medical sciences

== 関連エントリー ==
- Tokyo Medical Practitioners Association

== Publications ==
- Journal of the Japan Medical Association (日本医師会雑誌, Nihon Ishikai Zashi). First published in 1921, this publication is distributed to all members monthly with two special editions annually. This journal is published in Japanese only. ISSN 0021-4493
- Japan Medical News (日医ニュース, Nichi I Nyūsu). First published in 1964, this newsletter is distributed bimonthly to all members.
- Japan Medical Association Journal (JMAJ ). First published monthly in 1958 under the name Asian Medical Journal, this journal has been published since 2001 under its current name. Since 2015 it has been published quarterly. This journal is a clinical research publication published in English. ISSN 1346-8650.

== See also ==
- List of medical organisations
- Japan Dental Association
