= Kengo Oishi =

Japanese politician (born 1982)

- 大石賢吾
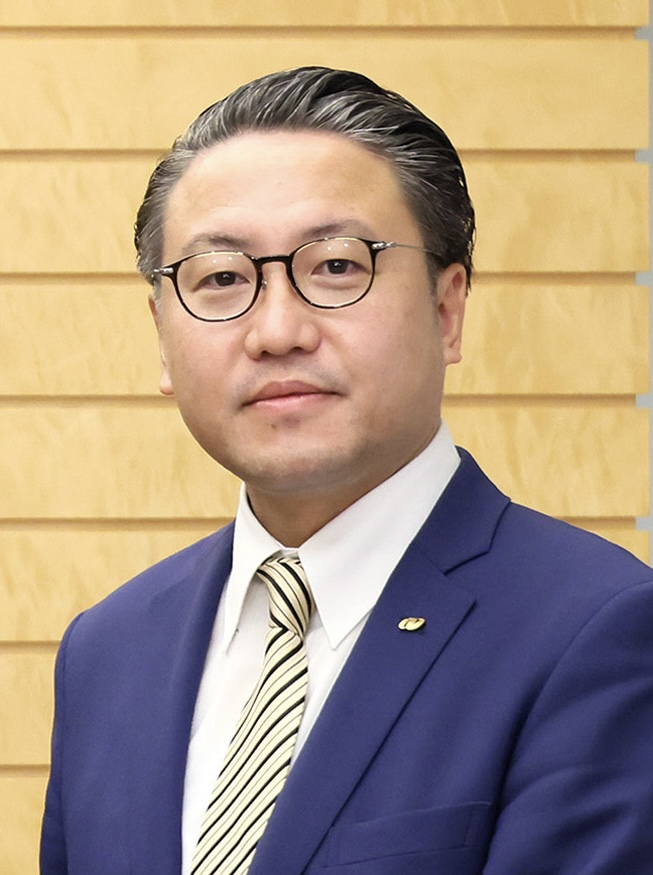
- Oishi in 2022

Governor of Nagasaki Prefecture
- In office 2 March 2022 – 1 March 2026
- Monarch: Naruhito
- Preceded by: Hōdō Nakamura
- Succeeded by: Ken Hirata

Personal details
- Born: 8 July 1982 (age 44) Tomie, Nagasaki, Japan
- Party: Independent
- Education: University of California, Davis; Chiba University (M.D.)

Kengo Oishi (大石賢吾, Ōishi Kengo; born 8 July 1982) is a Japanese politician who served as the governor of Nagasaki Prefecture from 2022 to 2026.
