= Takemi Miyamae =

Japanese baseball coach

Takemi Miyamae 宮前 岳巳
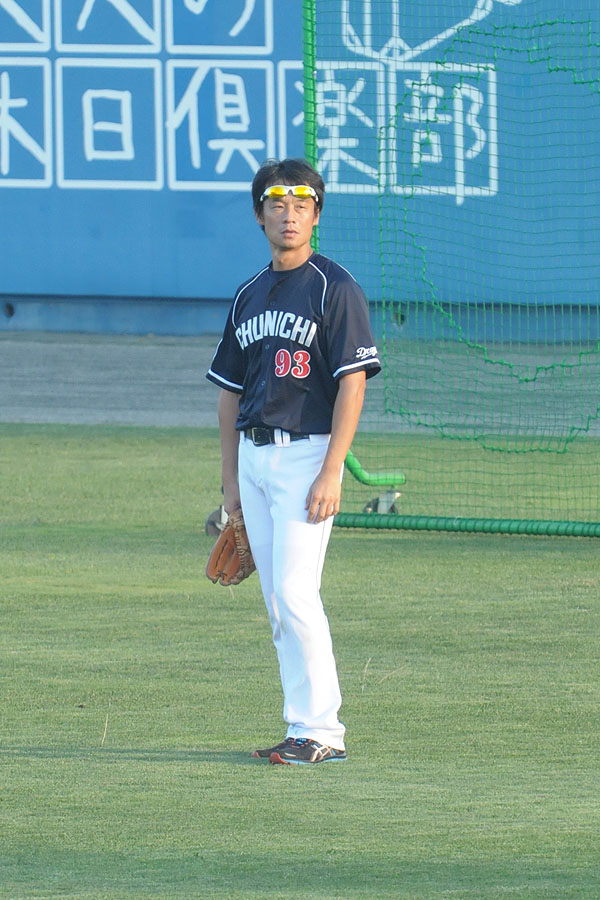

Chunichi Dragons – No. 93
- Conditioning Coach
- Born: November 1, 1968 (age 57); Osaka, Japan

Teams
- As Coach: Chunichi Dragons (2004–present)

Takemi Miyamae (宮前 岳巳, Miyamae Takemi; born November 1, 1968 in Osaka, Japan) is a Japanese conditioning coach for the Chunichi Dragons in Japan's Nippon Professional Baseball.

== Career ==
Miyamae graduated from Seifu High School where he was a 400m hurdles runner. He took part in the 4x400 hurdle relay in the 1985 inter-high school tournament in Yamaguchi where he reached the semi-finals. Once graduating high school, he entered Osaka University of Health and Sport Sciences.

Following graduation from university, Miyamae worked with the rugby club at Jōshō Keikoku Gakuen High School as a trainer. He later worked with the Mitsubishi Fuso Truck and Bus Corporation baseball team, helping the team to two inter-city tournament wins in 2000 and 2003. In 2004, Miyamae was recruited by the Chunichi Dragons of Nippon Professional Baseball as conditioning coach.

== Personal ==
At the Okinawa spring camp between February 1 and 27, 2017, Miyamae had a short exposure on the Chunichi Dragons official twitter showing the job that the less remarkable backroom staff make. A similar expose was shown in 2018.

On 27 February 2017 while moving for an open game against the Hokkaido Nippon Ham Fighters, Miyamae and fellow conditioning coach Kōsei Katsuzaki rushed to the help of a man who had fainted at Naha Airport where they instructed staff and aided paramedics.
