= Taro Takemi =

Japanese physician

Taro Takemi KBE
- 武見 太郎
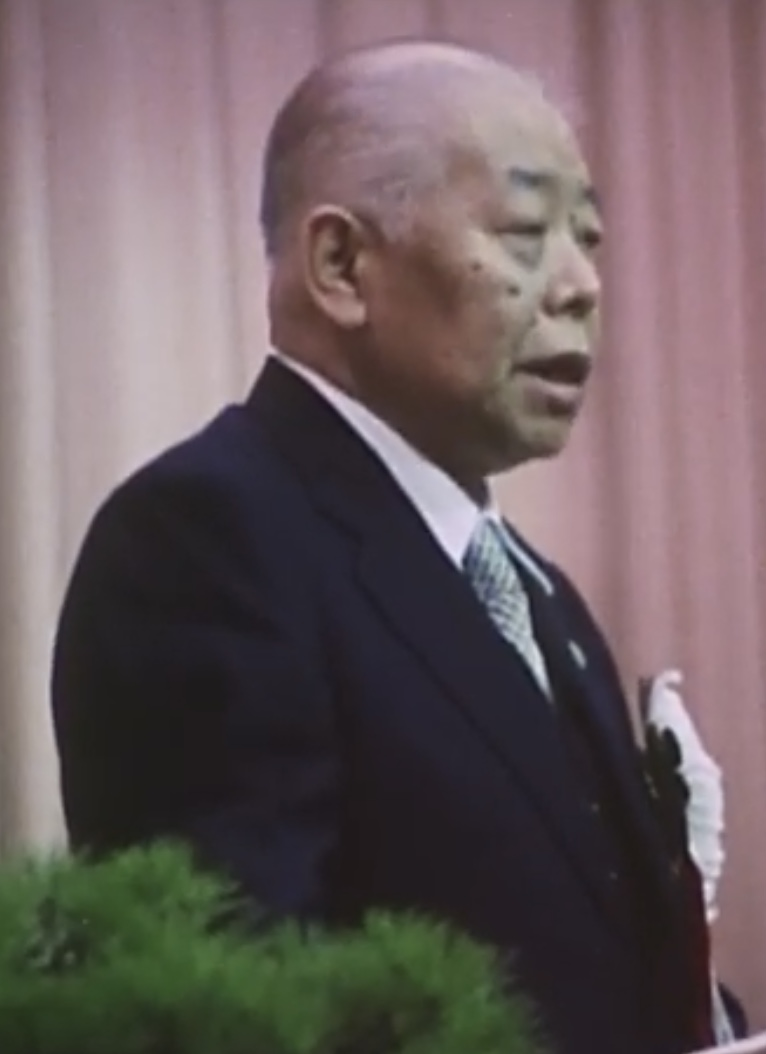
- Takemi in 1980
- Born: 7 August 1904; Kyoto Prefecture, Japan
- Died: 20 December 1983 (aged 79); Tokyo, Japan
- Other name: Dr. Taro
- Education: Keio University
- Occupation: Physician
- Years active: 1930–1982
- Children: Keizo Takemi

Taro Takemi KBE (武見 太郎, Takemi Tarō; 7 August 1904 – 20 December 1983) was a Japanese physician who served as 11th President of the Japan Medical Association for 25 years from 1957 to 1982, and also served as president of the World Medical Association from 1975 to 1976.

== Life ==
Takemi completed his M.D. in 1930 from Keio University School of Medicine. He went to RIKEN to study the application of nuclear physics to medicine under Yoshio Nishina who was a famous physicist in Japan. He built the first portable electrocardiograph in 1937, and was also known for his invention of the vectorcardiograph in 1939. Also a medical researcher, he patented several laboratory processes, and was a member of the research and survey team which investigated effects of the atomic bombing of Hiroshima in 1945.

He became a clinician in Ginza, Tokyo in 1939, and served as a visiting professor at Keio, Kitasato, and Tokai universities in Japan, and advised the Japan Science and Technology Agency. In 1982, he was appointed a visiting professor at the Harvard School of Public Health, but was unable to fulfill the commitment due to illness. He died in Tokyo in December 1983.

The Takemi Program in International Health at the Harvard School of Public Health was established in 1983 and is named after him. The Takemi Memorial Hall was established by the Japan Radioisotope Association in Takizawa, Iwate in 1989.

== Awards and honours ==
Takemi received numerous honors and awards include the following:

- Order of the Southern Cross
- Hon. Knight Commander of the Order of the British Empire (KBE)
- Grand Officer of the Order of Merit of the Italian Republic (OMRI, 1977)
- Silver Medal from Pope Paul VI

== Family ==
His son, Keizo Takemi, is a politician.
