= Nagasaki at-large district =

Japan House of Councillors constituency

- 長崎県選挙区
- Parliamentary constituency for the House of Councillors
- Prefecture: Nagasaki
- Electorate: 1,092,899 (as of September 2022)

Current constituency
- Created: 1947
- Seats: 2
- Councillors: Class of 2019: Yuichiro Koga (LDP); Class of 2022: Keisuke Yamamoto (LDP)

The Nagasaki at-large district (長崎県選挙区, Nagasaki-ken Senkyo-ku) is a constituency of the House of Councillors in the Diet of Japan. It consists of Nagasaki Prefecture and elects two Councillors, one every three years by a first-past-the-post system for a six-year term. In the first election in 1947, Nagasaki like all districts used single non-transferable vote to elect both its Councillors in one election. Similar to other small, rural Kyushu prefectures, it is a "conservative kingdom" in favor of the LDP. Since the Democratic Party folded, LDP candidates have consistently won with over 50% of the vote.

Single-member districts (ichinin-ku) for the House of Councillors often play a decisive role for the outcome of elections as little swing in votes is required to achieve a change of the Councillors elected there. Under the 1955 System Nagasaki voted consistently for conservative candidates until the landslide election of 1989 that led to a "twisted parliament" (nejire kokkai: opposition control of the House of Councillors). Following the party realignments of the 1990s when reformist conservative and liberal parties and ultimately the Democratic Party replaced the Socialists as the main opposition to the LDP, Nagasaki became a more closely contested potential swing district.

== Elected Councillors ==
Class of 1947	Election year	Class of 1950
#1 (1947: #1, 6-year term)	Election year	#1 (1947: #2, 3-year term)
Shigeo Fujino (Indep.)	1947	Takeo Shimizu (JSP) †
Shigeo Fujino (Indep.)	1948 by-el.	Moriichi Kadoya (DP)
Shigeo Fujino (Indep.)	1950	Shun'ichirō Akiyama (LP)
Shigeo Fujino (Yoshida LP)	1953	Shun'ichirō Akiyama (LP)
Shigeo Fujino (Yoshida LP)	1956	Shun'ichirō Akiyama (LDP)
Shigeo Fujino (LDP)	1959	Shun'ichirō Akiyama (LDP)
Shigeo Fujino (LDP)	1962	Kan'ichi Kubo (LDP) #
Naozō Taura (LDP) †	1965	Kan'ichi Kubo (LDP) #
Tatsuhiko Tatsuta (JSP)	w/o vote	Kan'ichi Kubo (LDP) #
Tatsuhiko Tatsuta (JSP)	1968	Kan'ichi Kubo (LDP) #
Tatsuhiko Tatsuta (JSP)	1970 by-el.	Takiichirō Hatsumura (LDP)
Teiji Nakamura (LDP)	1971	Takiichirō Hatsumura (LDP)
Teiji Nakamura (LDP)	1974	Takiichirō Hatsumura (LDP)
Teiji Nakamura (LDP)	1977	Takiichirō Hatsumura (LDP)
Teiji Nakamura (LDP)	1980	Takiichirō Hatsumura (LDP)
Hiroshi Miyajima (LDP)	1983	Takiichirō Hatsumura (LDP)
Hiroshi Miyajima (LDP)	1986	Takiichirō Hatsumura (LDP)
Toshiko Shinozaki (JSP)	1989	Takiichirō Hatsumura (LDP)
Toshiko Shinozaki (JSP)	1992	Sōichirō Matsutani (LDP)
Tadashi Taura (NFP)	1995	Sōichirō Matsutani (LDP)
Tadashi Taura (NFP)	1998	Sōichirō Matsutani (LDP)
Tadashi Taura (LDP)	2001	Sōichirō Matsutani (LDP)
Tadashi Taura (LDP)	2004	Tadashi Inuzuka (DPJ)
Yukishige Ōkubo (DPJ)	2007	Tadashi Inuzuka (DPJ)
Yukishige Ōkubo (DPJ)	2010	Genjirō Kaneko (LDP)
Yuichiro Koga (LDP)	2013	Genjirō Kaneko (LDP)
Yuichiro Koga (LDP)	2016	Genjirō Kaneko (LDP)
Yuichiro Koga (LDP)	2019	Genjirō Kaneko (LDP)
Yuichiro Koga (LDP)	2022	Keisuke Yamamoto (LDP)

#: resigned to contest the 1970 Nagasaki gubernatorial election; †: died in office

== Election results ==
2025
Party	Candidate	Votes	%	±%
LDP	Yuichiro Koga (Incumbent) (Endorsed by the Komeito)			
DPP	Hiroshi Fukahori			
Sanseito	Ryuta Kuroishi			
JCP	Ryosuke Tsutsui			
Nippon Seishinkai	Kikuo Takaya			
Anti-NHK	Kotaro Kamiya			
LDP hold				

2022
Party	Candidate	Votes	%	±%
LDP	Keisuke Yamamoto (Endorsed by the Komeito)	261,554	50.1	
CDP	Ayumi Shirakawa (Endorsed by the SDP)	152,473	29.2	
Ishin	Mami Yamada	53,715	10.3	
JCP	Ayako Yasue	26,281	5.0	
Sanseitō	Ayako Ogata	21,363	4.1	
Anti-NHK	Kazuto Okuma	6,969	1.3	
Turnout		522,355		
LDP hold				

2019
Party	Candidate	Votes	%	±%
LDP	Yuichiro Koga (Incumbent) (Endorsed by Komeito)	258,109	51.5	
Democratic Party for the People	Ayumi Shirakawa (Endorsed by the JCP and the SDP)	224,022	44.7	
Anti-NHK	Kotaro Kamiya	19,240	3.8	
Turnout		501,371		
LDP hold				

2016
Party	Candidate	Votes	%	±%
LDP	Genjiro Kaneko (Incumbent)	336,612	52.9	
Democratic	Hideko Nishioka	285,743	44.9	
Happiness Realization	Masatoshi Enatsu	13,936	2.2	
Turnout		636,291		
LDP hold				

2013
Party	Candidate	Votes	%	±%
LDP	Yuichiro Koga	359,805	59.2	
Democratic	Yukishige Okubo	186,402	30.7	
JCP	Toshihiko Haraguchi	45,683	7.5	
Happiness Realization	Kiyoto Yamada	15,586	2.6	
Turnout		607,476		
LDP gain from Democratic				

2010
Party	Candidate	Votes	%	±%
LDP	Genjiro Kaneko	344,182	48.8	
Democratic	Tadashi Inuzuka (Incumbent)	272,043	38.6	
Your	Norihiko Nakashima	60,829	8.6	
JCP	Eiko Fuchise	28,614	4.0	
Turnout		705,668		
LDP gain from Democratic				

2007
Party	Candidate	Votes	%	±%
Democratic	Yukishige Okubo	352,953	49.0	
LDP	Tadashi Komine	331,147	46.0	
JCP	Eiko Fuchise	35,837	5.0	
Turnout		719,937		
Democratic gain from LDP				

2004
Party	Candidate	Votes	%	±%
Democratic	Tadashi Inuzuka	344,606	49.5	
LDP	Soichiro Matsutani (Incumbent)	303,723	43.7	
JCP	Toshihiko Haraguchi	47,457	6.8	
Turnout		695,786		
Democratic gain from LDP				

2001
Party	Candidate	Votes	%	±%
LDP	Tadashi Taura	356,934	53.4	
Independent	Yuji Mitsuno	195,670	29.3	
Independent	Kotaro Tanaka	46,199	6.9	
JCP	Kimiko Ogawa	44,262	6.6	
Women's Party	Sachiko Matsumoto	25,265	3.8	
Turnout		668,330		
LDP gain from New Frontier				

1998
Party	Candidate	Votes	%	±%
LDP	Soichiro Matsutani (Incumbent)	271,607	42.1	
Independent	Yuji Mitsuno	244,733	37.9	
JCP	Kieko Nishimura	84,646	13.1	
Liberal League	Kazuko Teraoka	44,807	6.9	
Turnout		645,793		
LDP hold				

1995
Party	Candidate	Votes	%	±%
New Frontier	Tadashi Taura	174,017	30.6	
LDP	Daisuke Miyajima	165,387	29.1	
Independent	Kuro Matsuda	98,447	17.3	
Socialist	Ryuichi Sato	96,081	16.9	
JCP	Kieko Nishimura	34,032	6.0	
Turnout		567,964		
New Frontier gain from Socialist				

1992
Party	Candidate	Votes	%	±%
LDP	Soichiro Matsutani	320,060	55.0	
Democratic Reform Party	Yuji Hagi	206,611	35.5	
JCP	Satoru Ishikawa	55,621	9.6	
Turnout		582,292		
LDP hold				

1989
Party	Candidate	Votes	%	±%
Socialist	Toshiko Shinozaki	344,416	44.9	
LDP	Akira Miyajima	238,511	31.1	
Independent	Soichiro Matsutani	151,053	19.7	
JCP	Satoru Ishikawa	30,134	3.9	
Nihon Seinensha	Koichi Hachiya	3,835	0.5	
Turnout		767,949		
Socialist gain from LDP				

1986
Party	Candidate	Votes	%	±%
LDP	Takichiro Hatsumara	409,065	49.2	
Socialist	Kai Hayami	200,385	24.1	
Independent	Goro Asada	174,896	21.0	
JCP	Yasushi Tanaka	47,113	5.7	
Turnout		831,459		
LDP hold				

1983
Party	Candidate	Votes	%	±%
LDP	Akira Miyajima	325,733	55.9	
Socialist	Kenji Taguchi	210,483	36.1	
JCP	Yasushi Tanaka	46,136	7.9	
Turnout		582,352		
LDP hold				

1980
Party	Candidate	Votes	%	±%
LDP	Takiichiro Hatsumura	452,561	58.3	
Socialist	Tatsuhiko Tatsuta	267,786	34.5	
JCP	Yasuo Furuki	55,376	7.1	
Turnout		775,723		

1977
Party	Candidate	Votes	%	±%
LDP	Teiji Nakamura (Incumbent)	380,332	53.1	
Socialist	Tatsuhiko Tatsuta	295,478	41.2	
JCP	Yasuo Furuki	40,943	5.7	
Turnout		716,303	72.6	−0.4
LDP hold				

1974
Party	Candidate	Votes	%	±%
LDP	Takiichiro Hatsumara (Incumbent)	365,198	51.9	−2.7
Socialist	Kenji Yamaguchi	198,713	28.2	−13.5
Kōmeitō	Koreo Taniguchi	84,463	12.0	NEW
JCP	Shinsuke Nakata	55,254	7.9	+5.8
LDP hold				

1971
Party	Candidate	Votes	%	±%
LDP	Teiji Nakamura	298,099	52.4	
Socialist	Tatsuhiko Tatsuta (Incumbent)	242,715	42.6	
JCP	Kazuo Masumoto	28,433	5.0	
Turnout		569,247	61.0	−9.7
LDP gain from Socialist				

1970 By-Election
Party	Candidate	Votes	%	±%
LDP	Takiichiro Hatsumura	215,717	54.6	
Socialist	Masato Yoshinaga	164,816	41.7	
JCP	Kazu Masumoto	14,450	3.7	
Independent	Umeshige Yamagishi	14,686	2.1	
Turnout		409,669		
LDP hold				

1968
Party	Candidate	Votes	%	±%
LDP	Kanichi Kubo	362,875	58.7	
Socialist	Kunito Abe	211,821	34.3	
JCP	Yasunobu Uchida	43,238	7.0	
Turnout		617,934		
LDP hold				

1965
Party	Candidate	Votes	%	±%
LDP	Naozo Taura (Note: Naozo Taura was elected in July 1965, however Taura died within 3 months of the election, so the second placed Tatsuhiko Tatsuta took the seat without a by-election)	247,026	44.8	
Socialist	Tatsuhiko Tatsuta	218,423	39.6	
Democratic Socialist	Yutaka Sano	50,290	9.1	
JCP	Hajime Miyamoto	22,930	4.2	
Japan New National Party	Hajime Hidaka	7,662	1.4	
Independent	Jiro Fujita	5,091	0.9	
Turnout		551,422	65.6	−0.1
LDP hold				

1962
Party	Candidate	Votes	%	±%
LDP	Kanichi Kubo	320,911	55.7	
Socialist	Tatsuhiko Tatsuta	241,968	42.0	
JCP	Junjiro Fukuoka	13,755	2.4	
Turnout		576,634		
LDP hold				

1959
Party	Candidate	Votes	%	±%
LDP	Shigeo Fujino (Incumbent)	259,224	48.4	
Socialist	Shigemitsu Nakamura	248,259	46.4	
JCP	Yutaka Miyajima	28,138	5.3	
Turnout		535,621		
LDP hold				

1956
Party	Candidate	Votes	%	±%
LDP	Shunichiro Akiyama (Incumbent)	267,640	50.5	
Socialist	Shigemitsu Nakamura	242,355	45.7	
JCP	Masao Mori	20,069	3.8	
Turnout		530,064		
LDP hold				

1953
Party	Candidate	Votes	%	±%
Liberal	Shigeo Fujino (Incumbent)	229,203	43.8	
Right Socialist	Tadao Shimokawa	212,689	40.7	
Kaishintō	Isamu Aoki	81,254	15.5	
Turnout		523,146		
Liberal gain from Independent				

1950
Party	Candidate	Votes	%	±%
Liberal	Shunichiro Akiyama	225,963	43.0	
Independent	Tsuyoshi Kihara	163,831	31.2	
Independent	Hideo Marugame	135,588	25.8	
Turnout		525,382		
Liberal gain from Democratic				

1948 By-Election
Party	Candidate	Votes	%	±%
Democratic	Seiichi Kadoya	133,314	43.9	
Liberal	Mansaku Fukuda	104,593	34.4	
Socialist	Fumio Tsuji	51,891	17.1	
Liberal	Shuzo Tsukamoto	13,944	4.6	
Turnout		303,742		
Democratic gain from Socialist				

1947
Party	Candidate	Votes	%	±%
Independent	Shigeo Fujino	126,859	35.2	
Socialist	Takeo Shimizu	118,921	33.0	
Democratic	Soshichiro Tsukikawa	58,180	16.2	
Liberal	Kiyoshi Yokose	55,986	15.6	
Turnout		359,946		
Independent win (new seat)				
Socialist win (new seat)				
