= Nagasaki University =

National university of Japan

Coordinates: 32°47′10″N 129°51′59″E

- (Nagasaki Daigaku)
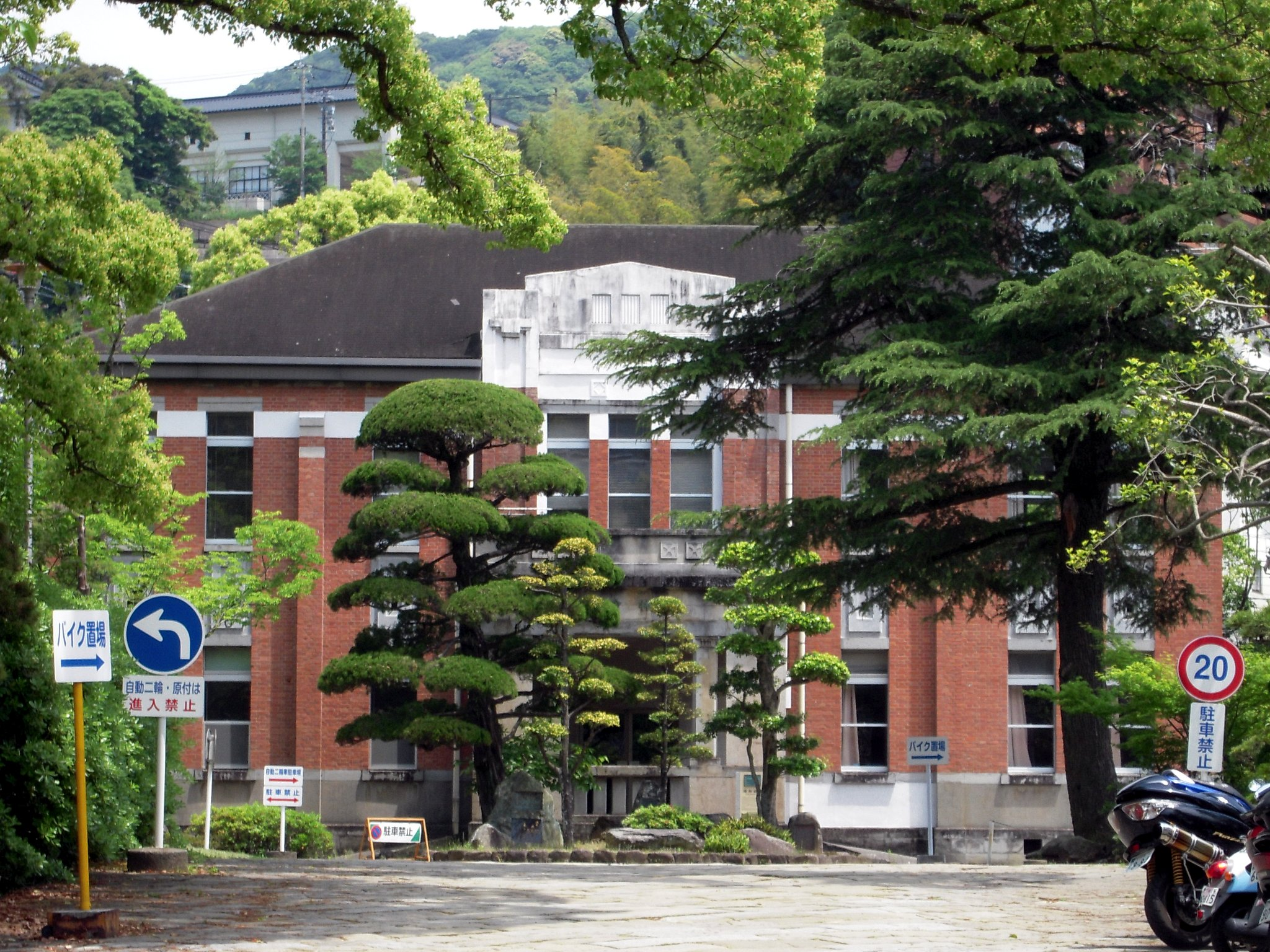
- Type: National
- Established: 1949
- President: Shigeru Katamine
- Location: Nagasaki, Nagasaki Prefecture, Japan
- Campus: Urban
- Website: www.nagasaki-u.ac.jp/en

Nagasaki University (長崎大学, Nagasaki daigaku) is a national university of Japan. Its nickname is Chōdai (長大). The main campus is located in Bunkyo-machi, Nagasaki City, Nagasaki Prefecture, Japan.

== History ==
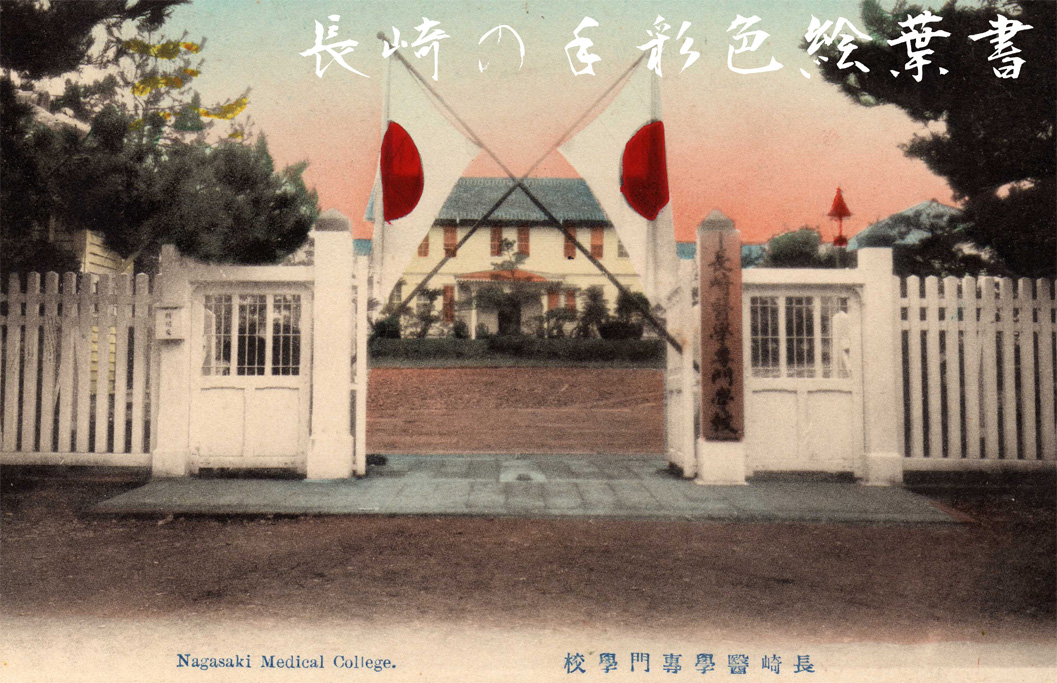
Nagasaki Medical College in the Meiji Era

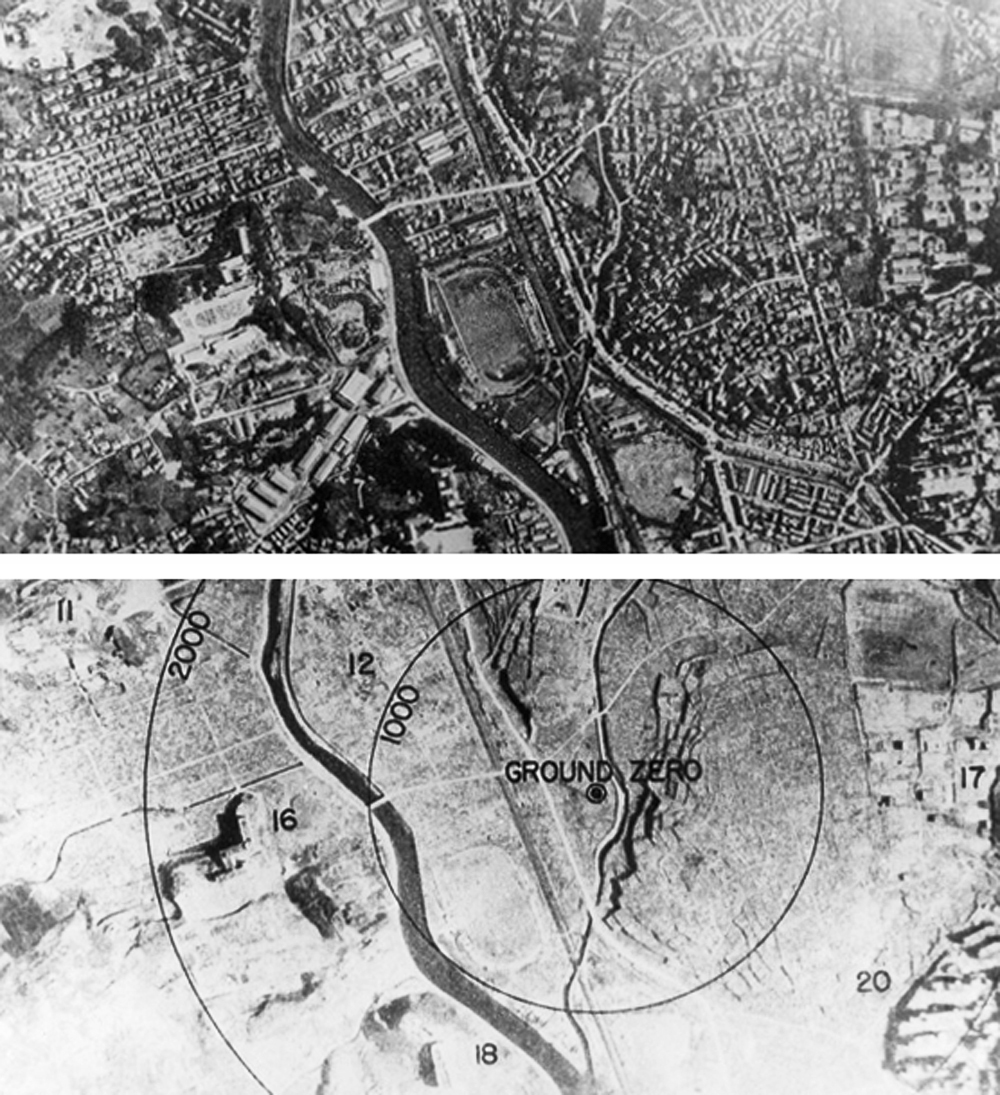
Nagasaki before and after the Atomic Bombing. "17": Nagasaki Medical College, "20": Hospital

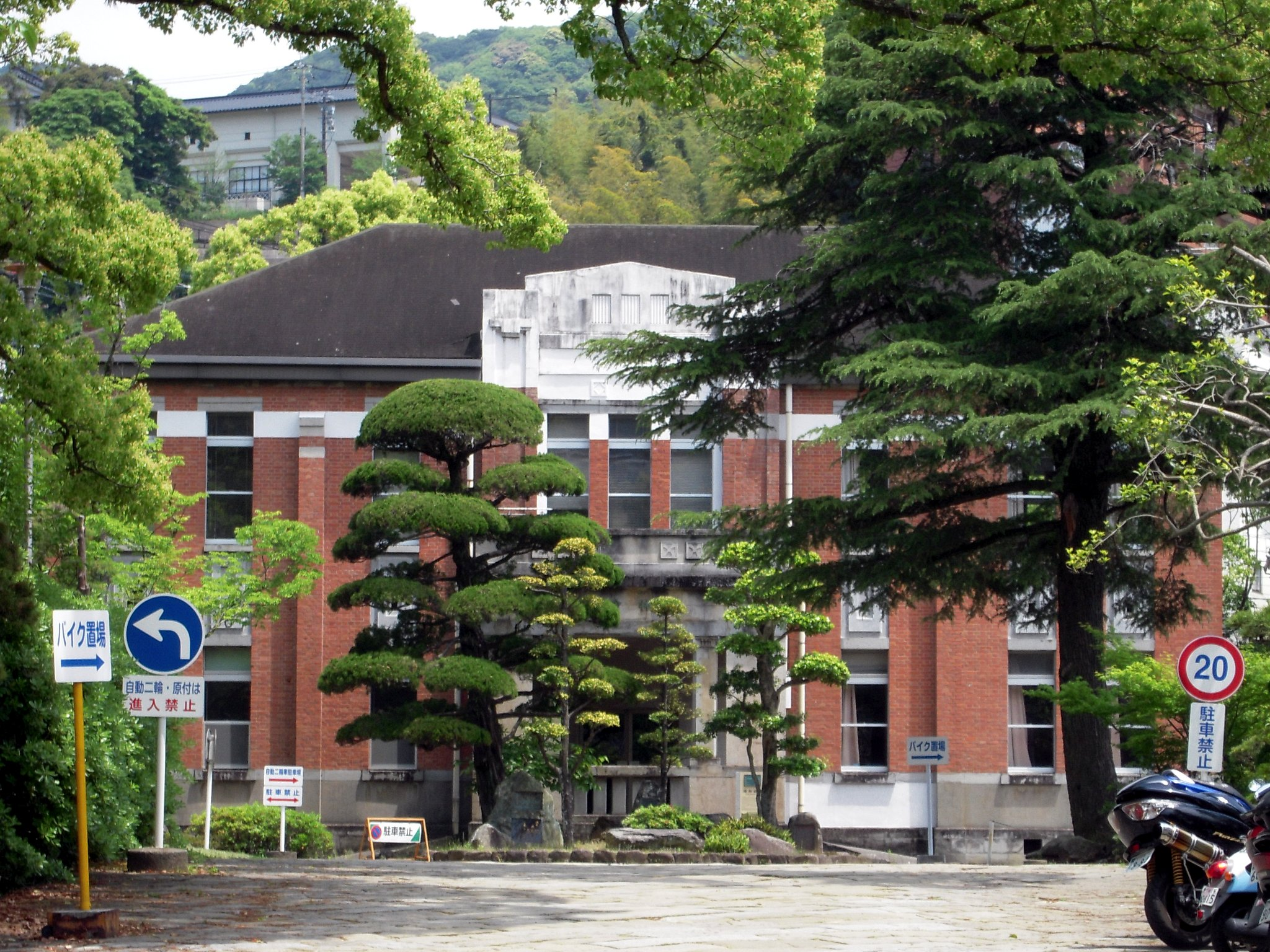
Keirin Hall at Katafuchi Campus, built in 1919

Nagasaki University was established in 1949 by incorporating several national institutions, namely, Nagasaki Medical College (including College Hospital and College of Pharmaceutical Sciences), Nagasaki College of Economics, Nagasaki Normal School, Nagasaki Youth Normal School and Nagasaki High School.

The new main campus (Bunkyo Campus) was formerly a plant site of Mitsubishi Arms Factory (Ohashi Plant).

=== Nagasaki Medical College ===
The oldest of the predecessors was Nagasaki Medical College. It was founded in November 1857 as Medical Training Institute (医学伝習所, Igaku denshūsho) by the branch office of Tokugawa Shogunate. The first professor was J. L. C. Pompe van Meerdervoort, and the institute was one of the first western-style (not Kampō) medical schools in Japan. In 1861 the hospital was founded, and after Meiji Restoration the school became a public (prefectural, later national) medical school. It was developed into Nagasaki Vocational School of Medicine (長崎医学専門学校, Nagasaki igaku senmon gakkō) in 1901, then into Nagasaki Medical College (長崎医科大学, Nagasaki ika daigaku) in 1923.

After Japan participated in the Pacific War, the medical college added several institutes for the war, such as Temporary College of Medicine (1940) and East Asia Research Institute of Endemics (1942, Institute of Tropical Medicine today). On August 9, 1945 the college was heavily damaged by the atomic bomb, because it was located only 500 to 700 meters away from the hypocenter. Over 800 professors, students and medical workers were killed. The college was moved to Omura in September 1945, and then to Isahaya in 1946. The old campus (Sakamoto Campus) was restored later in 1950, after the college was integrated into Nagasaki University.

==== Institute of Tropical Medicine ====
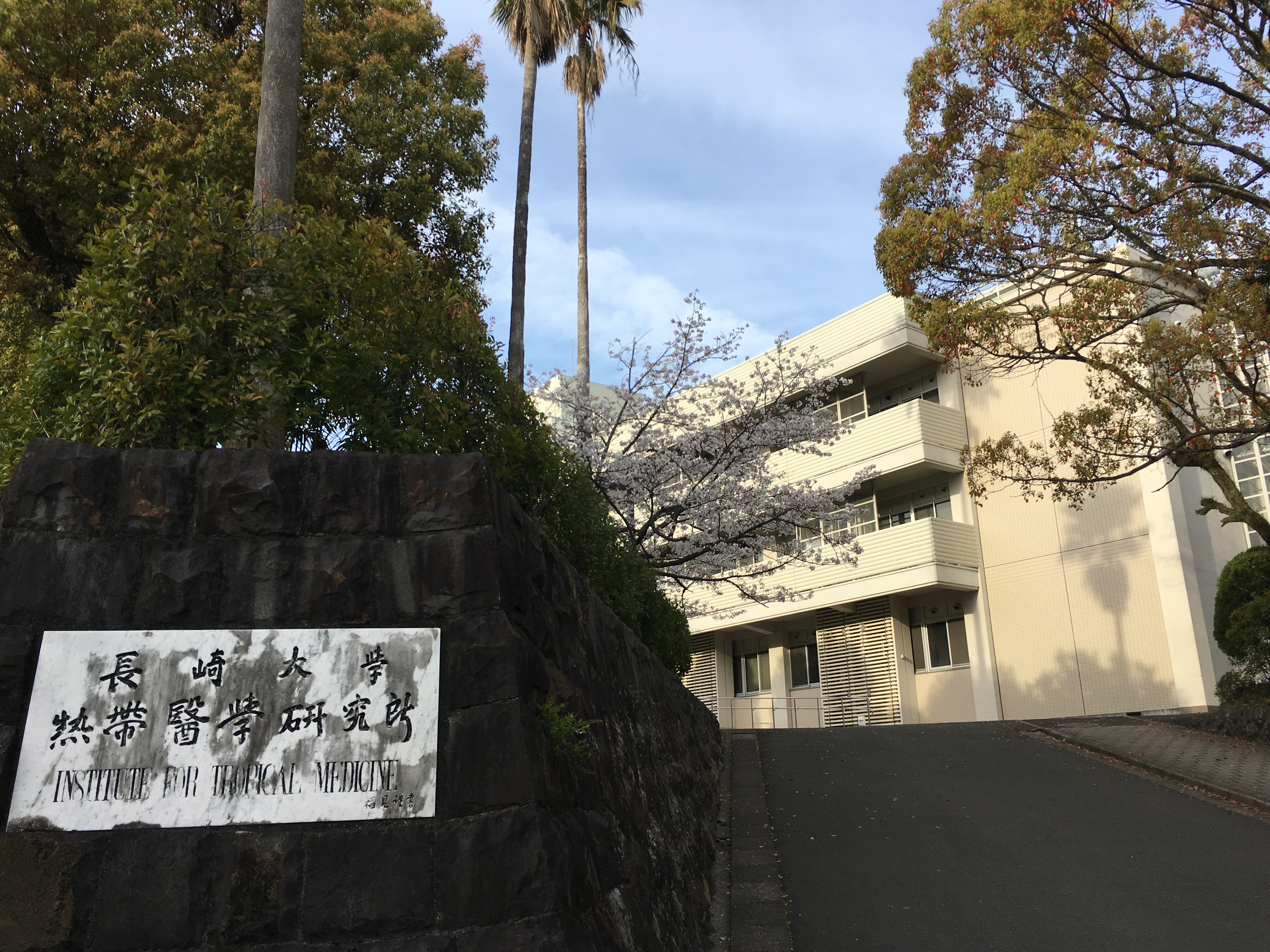
Institute of Tropical Medicine, Nagasaki University

The Institute of Tropical Medicine (長崎大学熱帯医学研究所], NEKKEN or NUITM) was originally founded under Nagasaki Medical College to perform basic and applied studies on endemic diseases in East Asia. In 1949, the institute merged with other facilities to form Nagasaki University under the new ruling of the National School Establishment Law.

Since 1946, researchers at NUITM have conducted fundamental and applied studies on tropical and emerging diseases. This includes infectious disease epidemiology studies and vaccine and therapeutics development against infectious diseases. Researchers at NUITM have established several international research partnerships, including in Vietnam the Philippines, and Kenya, to study emerging and re-emerging diseases. The institute has research stations in Vietnam and Kenya, and of note, the field research conducted in Kenya has inspired a popular song, novel, and charity foundation, and has been featured in a film, The Lion Standing in the Wind.

As one of the world's leading institutes for training and research in tropical medicine and health care, it is stipulated as a Joint Usage/ Research Center under the Ministry of Education, Culture, Sports, Science and Technology (MEXT) to spear-head academic research, and is a member of the Japan Infectious Disease Research Consortium that includes Institute of Medical Science (Japan), Osaka University and Hokkaido University.

With over one hundred graduate students enrolled, NUITM carries out an extensive capacity strengthening program in counterpart countries, and collaborates with a large network of institutions in Africa, South America, and Asia through MEXT, Japan International Cooperation Agency (JICA), Official Development Assistance (Japan) (ODA), Japan Agency for Medical Research and Development (AMED) and the WHO. The institute acts as a WHO Collaborating Center for Research and Reference of Tropical and Emerging Viral Diseases and as the WHO's reference laboratories, providing confirmatory testing for COVID-19. The institute also offers a Joint PhD Programme for Global Health as part of an academic partnership with the London School of Hygiene and Tropical Medicine.

University rankings

Global – Overall
- QS World: 901-950 (2026)

Regional – Overall
- QS Asia: =236 (2025)

In response to the COVID-19 pandemic, the institute led the International Infectious Disease Consortium against COVID-19 (grant-in-aid emergency fund), an international research collaboration to develop countermeasures against the novel coronavirus, SARS-CoV-2. Researchers at NUITM, in collaboration with local public health institutes, initiated efforts in diagnosing SARS-CoV-2, including developing new diagnostic tools. Technology transfer and collaboration with Southeast Asian counterparts has shed light on how the disease spread in Japan and Southeast Asia.

=== Nagasaki College of Economics ===
Another notable predecessor was Nagasaki College of Economics. It was founded in March 1905 as Nagasaki Higher Commercial School (長崎高等商業学校, Nagasaki kōtō shōgyō gakkō). It was the fourth national commercial college in Japan, after Tokyo (1887), Kobe (1902) and Yamaguchi (February 1905), and aimed at educating students so that they could engage in business with China, Korea and Southeast Asia. In 1917 it added the Advanced Course for Trade (one-year course), and the building for the course was built in 1919 (Keirin Hall today).

In 1944 it was renamed Nagasaki College of Economics (長崎経済専門学校, Nagasaki keizai senmon gakkō). On August 9, 1945 although Nagasaki underwent the atomic bombing, the college buildings were protected by Mt. Kompira. Its campus (Katafuchi Campus) has been used by the Faculty of Economics, Nagasaki University.

== Undergraduate schools ==
Bunkyo Campus

- School of Global Humanities and Social Sciences
- Faculty of Education
- Faculty of Pharmaceutical Sciences
- Faculty of Engineering
- Faculty of Environmental Studies

Sakamoto Campus

- School of Medicine
- School of Dentistry

Katafuchi Campus

- Faculty of Economics

== Graduate schools ==
- Graduate School of Education (Master's courses only)
- Graduate School of Economics
- Graduate School of Science and Technology
- Graduate School of Biomedical Sciences
- Graduate School of International Health Development (Master's courses only)
- Graduate School of Global Humanities and Social Sciences
- Graduate School of Fisheries and Environmental Sciences

== Research institutes ==
- Atomic Bomb Disease Institute, Nagasaki University Graduate School of Biomedical Sciences

== Collaboration and MoU with foreign universities and institutes ==
- Islamic University, Bangladesh (MoU)
- London School of Hygiene and Tropical Medicine
- Kenya Medical Research Institute
- Mahidol University
- Lancaster University

== Controversy ==
In April 2019, Nagasaki University came under fire for banning smokers from their campus. This would prevent teachers from getting hired. Many smokers and non-smokers felt that the measure was discriminatory against smokers and their personal lives. Many also argued that smoking is not relevant to their employment.

Several people have filed lawsuits against the university for discrimination. However, no lawsuit has been currently settled.

== Notable alumni ==
- Takashi Nagai, physician specializing in radiology, an A-bomb victim.
- Osamu Shimomura, organic chemist and marine biologist, awarded the Nobel Prize in Chemistry in 2008 for his discovery and development of green fluorescent protein with two American chemists.
- Windell Rivera, microbiologist
- Madoka Kitamura, President, Representative Director of Toto Ltd.

== See also ==
- Tropical disease
- Neglected tropical diseases
- WHO
