= Japan Dental Association =

Association of Japanese dentists

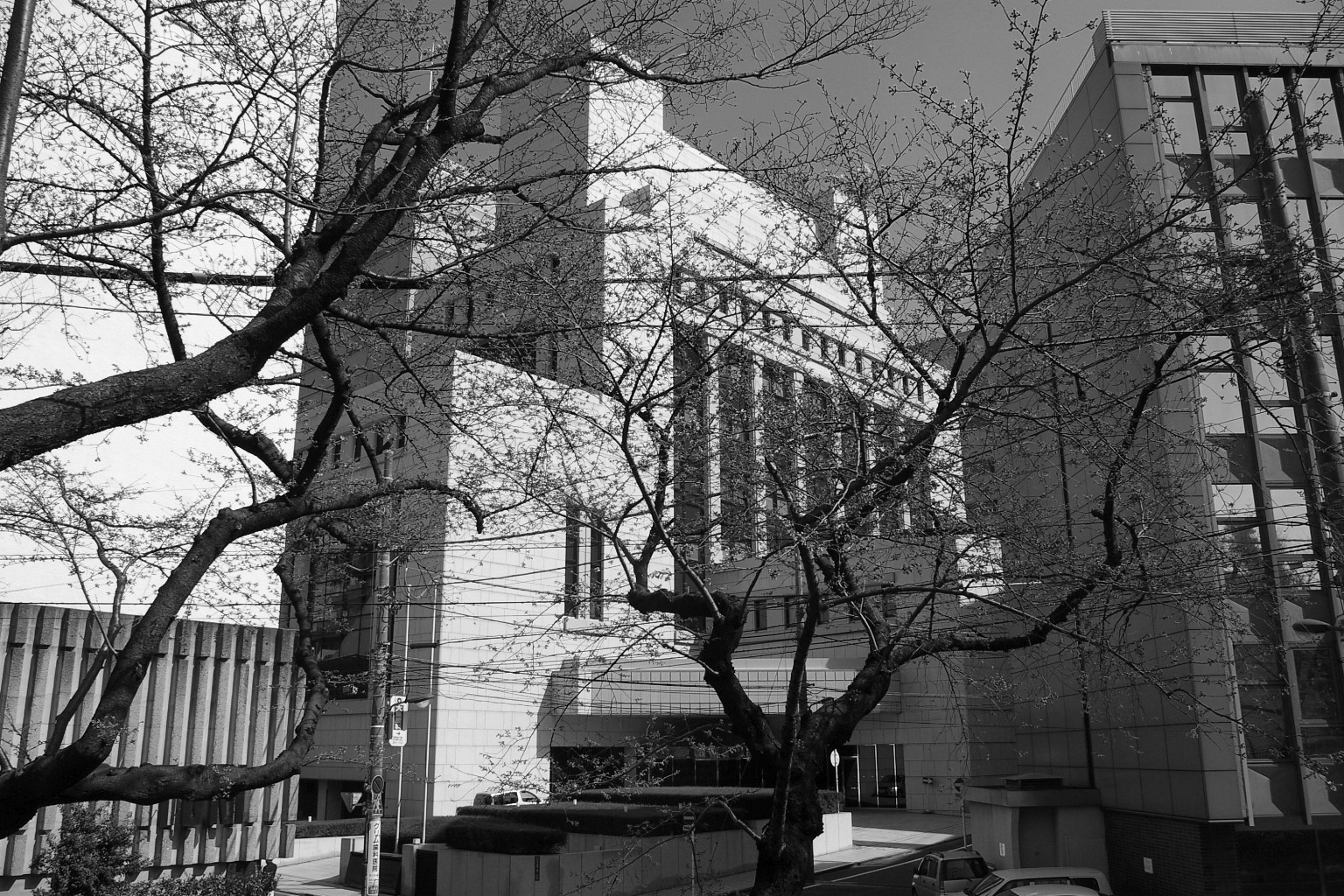
The official hall for Japan Dental Association.

Japan Dental Association (日本歯科医師会, Nihon Shika Ishikai) is a Japanese aggregate corporation whose membership consists of 72% percent of all dentists in Japan. The corporation was established in 1903 by dentist Kisai Takayama and others in order to promote the interests of dentists and their patients.
