= Genjirō Kaneko =

Japanese politician

- 金子 原二郎
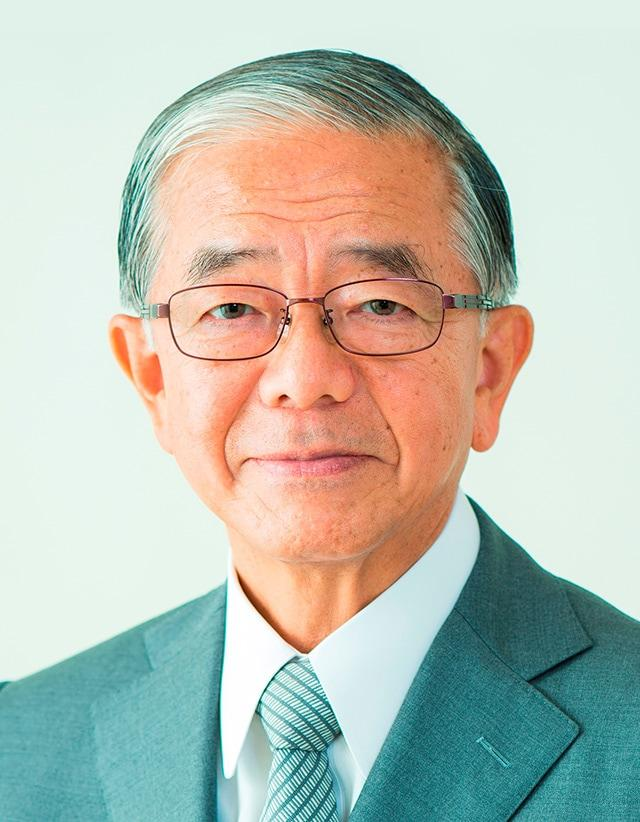
- Official portrait, 2021

Minister of Agriculture, Forestry and Fisheries
- In office 4 October 2021 – 10 August 2022
- Prime Minister: Fumio Kishida
- Preceded by: Kōtarō Nogami
- Succeeded by: Tetsuro Nomura

Member of the House of Councillors
- In office 26 July 2010 – 3 August 2022
- Preceded by: Tadashi Inuzuka
- Succeeded by: Keisuke Yamamoto
- Constituency: Nagasaki at-large

Governor of Nagasaki Prefecture
- In office 2 March 1998 – 1 March 2010
- Monarch: Akihito
- Preceded by: Isamu Takada
- Succeeded by: Hōdō Nakamura

Member of the House of Representatives
- In office 18 December 1983 – 23 January 1998
- Preceded by: Iwazō Kaneko
- Succeeded by: Daisuke Miyajima
- Constituency: Nagasaki 2nd (1983–1996); Nagasaki 4th (1996–1998)

Member of the Nagasaki Prefectural Assembly
- In office 1975–1983

Personal details
- Born: 8 May 1944 (age 82) Ikitsuki, Nagasaki, Japan
- Party: Liberal Democratic
- Children: Yōzō Kaneko
- Parent: Iwazō Kaneko (father)
- Education: Keio University

Genjirō Kaneko (金子 原二郎, Kaneko Genjirō; born 8 May 1944) is a Japanese politician and member of the Liberal Democratic Party. Kaneko served as Minister of Agriculture, Forestry and Fisheries from October 2021 to August 2022. He has also represented the Nagasaki At-large district in the House of Councillors since his election in the July 2010 Councillors election. Kaneko is a native of Ikitsuki, Nagasaki and graduate of Keio University.

== Political career ==
Kaneko first entered public office as a member of the Nagasaki Prefectural Assembly in 1975. He resigned during his third term in the assembly in 1983 to contest the national House of Representatives seat that was held at that time by his father Iwazō Kaneko. Genjiro came second in the Nagasaki 2nd district at the December 1983 general election, claiming one of the four seats represented by the district. Iwazō died at the age of 79 on 27 December 1983, 9 days after his son's election victory.

Kaneko retained his seat in the No.2 district at subsequent elections in 1986, 1990 and 1993. Following the electoral reforms of 1994, he became the member for the single-seat Nagasaki 4th district at the 1996 general election. In 1998, during his 5th term in the House of Representatives, Kaneko resigned from the house to contest the Nagasaki gubernatorial election.

Kaneko served as the governor of Nagasaki Prefecture for three terms from 1998 until 2010. He chose not to seek a fourth term and publicly endorsed his deputy Hōdō Nakamura at the February 2010 gubernatorial election . Nakamura defeated Tsuyoshi Hashimoto, who had the endorsement of the Democratic, Social Democratic and People's New parties.

In October 2021, he became Minister of Agriculture, Forestry and Fisheries during the Kishida Cabinet.

House of Councillors
Preceded by Tadashi Inuzuka	Councillor for Nagasaki; 2010–present	Incumbent
Political offices
Preceded by Isamu Takada	Governor of Nagasaki; 1998–2010	Succeeded by Hōdō Nakamura
House of Representatives (Japan)
New district	Representative for Nagasaki 4th district 1996–1998	Vacant Title next held by Daisuke Miyajima
Preceded by Masashi Ishibashi; Kōkai Nakamura; Nikichi Shirahama; Iwazō Kaneko	Representative for Nagasaki 2nd district (multi-member); 1983–1996; Served alongside: Masahiko Yamada, Kazuo Torashima, ...	District eliminated
