= Hōdō Nakamura =

Japanese politician

- 中村 法道
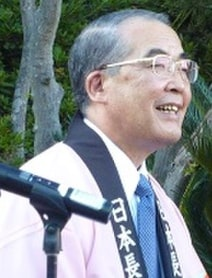
- Nakamura in 2014

Governor of Nagasaki Prefecture
- In office 2 March 2010 – 1 March 2022
- Monarchs: Akihito; Naruhito
- Preceded by: Genjirō Kaneko
- Succeeded by: Kengo Oishi

Personal details
- Born: 29 November 1950 (age 75) Arie, Nagasaki, Japan
- Party: Independent
- Education: Nagasaki University

Hōdō Nakamura (中村 法道, Nakamura Hōdō; born 29 November 1950) is a Japanese politician and a former governor of Nagasaki Prefecture located in the Kyushu region of Japan. He was re-elected for another four-year term as governor in both 2014 and 2018. Nakamura ran for a fourth term in 2022, but lost the elections.

== Anti-nuclear ==
Governor Nakamura together with Nagasaki City mayor Tomihisa Taue filed a protest against the first U.S. nuclear test under President Barack Obama.
