= 2026 Japanese local elections =

In 2026, numerous local elections are scheduled to be held in Japan outside the unified local elections in 2023 and 2027, including 12 gubernatorial elections and other local elections, due to term expiry.

== Background ==
The Japanese political process has two types of elections.

- National elections (国政選挙, kokusei senkyo)
- Subnational/local elections (地方選挙, chihō senkyo)

While the national level features a parliamentary system of government where the head of government is elected indirectly by the legislature, prefectures and municipalities employ a presidential system where chief executives and legislative assemblies are directly elected, independently from each other. Many of the prefectural and municipal elections are held together in unified local elections (統一地方選挙, Tōitsu chihō senkyo) since 1947, held in years before leap years; but since each election cycle of every chief executive or assembly of any prefecture or municipality is independent and not reset after resignations/deaths/recalls/no-confidence votes/dissolutions/municipal mergers, there are also many non-unified local elections today. Prefectural and municipal assemblies are unicameral, the National Diet is bicameral, with the two houses on independent election cycles.

== Gubernatorial ==
15 gubernatorial elections are scheduled to be held in 2026.

=== Fukui Prefecture ===
The 2026 Fukui gubernatorial election was held on 25 January 2026.

==== Background ====
Incumbent Tatsuji Sugimoto stepped down from office on 4 December 2025 following allegations of sexual harassing staff using texts.

Date	Before election		After election	
Date	Governor	Party	Governor	Party
25 January 2026	Vacant (Note: Tatsuji Sugimoto resigned on 4 December 2025, thus the gubernatorial seat is vacant.)	None	Takato Ishida	Independent

2026 Fukui Gubernatorial Election
Party	Candidate	Votes	%	±%
Independent	Takato Ishida	134,620	47.97	new
Independent	Ken'ichi Yamada	130,290	46.43	new
JCP	Kanemoto Yukie	15,735	5.61	▼5.1
Registered electors		610,925		▼4.79

=== Yamaguchi Prefecture ===
The 2026 Yamaguchi gubernatorial election was held on 8 February 2026.

Date	Before election		After election	
Date	Governor	Party	Governor	Party
8 February 2026	Tsugumasa Muraoka	Independent	Tsugumasa Muraoka	Independent

Candidates	Party	Votes	%
Tsugumasa Muraoka (Incumbent)	Independent	414,839	69.1
Machiko Arichika	Independent	156,398	26.1
Masako Okubo	Independent	28,997	4.8

=== Nagasaki Prefecture ===
The 2026 Nagasaki gubernatorial election was held on 8 February 2026.

Date	Before election		After election	
Date	Governor	Party	Governor	Party
8 February 2026	Kengo Oishi	Independent	Ken Hirata	Independent

Candidates	Party	Votes	%
Ken Hirata	Independent	287,134	48.3
Kengo Oishi (Incumbent)	Independent	280,346	47.2
Ryosuke Tsutsui	Independent	26,390	4.4

=== Osaka Prefecture ===
The 2026 Osaka gubernatorial election was held on 8 February 2026. Incumbent governor Hirofumi Yoshimura resigned on 22 January 2025.

Date	Before election		After election	
Date	Governor	Party	Governor	Party
8 February 2026	Hirofumi Yoshimura (Note: Yoshimura resigned on 22 January 2026)	Ishin	Hirofumi Yoshimura	Ishin

Candidates	Party	Votes	%
Hirofumi Yoshimura	Ishin (Incumbent)	3,024,106	83.2
Tsuneki Onishi	Independent	452,807	12.5
Tamotsu Noto	Independent	155,855	4.3

=== Ishikawa Prefecture ===
The 2026 Ishikawa gubernatorial election was held on 8 March 2026.

Date	Before election		After election	
Date	Governor	Party	Governor	Party
8 March 2026	Hiroshi Hase	Independent	Yukiyoshi Yamano	Independent

Candidates (Note: Listed here are candidates who formally announced their candidacy)	Party	Votes	%
Yukiyoshi Yamano	Independent	245,674	49.65
Hiroshi Hase (Incumbent)	Independent	239,564	48.42
Akira Kuroume	Independent	9,540	1.93

=== Kyoto Prefecture ===
The 2026 Kyoto gubernatorial election was held on 5 April 2026.

Date	Before election		After election	
Date	Governor	Party	Governor	Party
5 April 2026	Takatoshi Nishiwaki	Independent	Takatoshi Nishiwaki	Independent

Candidates	Party	Votes	%
Takatoshi Nishiwaki (Incumbent)	Independent	412,583	55.46
Satoshi Hamada	Japan Liberal Party (2025)	181,998	24.47
Nobuo Fujii	Independent	149,330	20.07

=== Niigata Prefecture ===
The 2026 Niigata gubernatorial election was held on 31 May 2026.

Date	Before election		After election	
Date	Governor	Party	Governor	Party
31 May 2026	Hideyo Hanazumi	Independent	Hideyo Hanazumi	Independent

Candidates	Party	Votes	%
Hideyo Hanazumi (Incumbent)	Independent	554,012	66.92
Ryugo Tsuchida	Independent	230,721	27.87
Satoshi Annaka	Independent	43,089	5.21

=== Shiga Prefecture ===
The 2026 Shiga gubernatorial election was held on 5 July 2026.

Date	Before election		After election	
Date	Governor	Party	Governor	Party
July 2026	Taizō Mikazuki	Independent	Taizō Mikazuki	Independent

Candidates	Party	Votes	%
Taizō Mikazuki (Incumbent)	Independent	297,036	66.12
Motoshi Ōsumi	Independent	96,918	21.57
Ikuo Tsubota	Independent	39,044	8.69
Masaaki Sakamoto	Independent	16,245	3.62

=== Nagano Prefecture ===
The 2026 Nagano gubernatorial election was held on 9 August 2026.

Date	Before election		After election	
Date	Governor	Party	Governor	Party
9 August 2026	Shuichi Abe	Independent	Shuichi Abe	Independent

Candidates	Party	Votes	%
Shuichi Abe (Incumbent)	Independent	573,742	86.13
Ryōsuke Takeda	Independent	92,366	13.87

=== Kagawa Prefecture ===
The 2026 Kagawa gubernatorial election was held on 30 August 2026.

Date	Before election		After election	
Date	Governor	Party	Governor	Party
30 August 2026	Toyohito Ikeda	Independent	Toyohito Ikeda	Independent

Candidates	Party	Votes	%
Toyohito Ikeda (Incumbent)	Independent	193,244	71.11
Fumihiko Senoo	Independent	49,296	18.14
Kenichi Tanabe	Independent	24,225	8.91
Katsunori Sone	Independent	4,986	1.83

=== Okinawa Prefecture ===
The 2026 Okinawa gubernatorial election was held on 13 September 2026.

Date	Before election		After election	
Date	Governor	Party	Governor	Party
13 September 2026	Denny Tamaki	Independent	Genta Koja	Independent

Candidates	Party	Votes	%
Genta Koja	Independent	423,124	59.42
Denny Tamaki (Incumbent)	Independent	276,060	38.77
Shun Kaneshima	Independent	4,657	0.65
Takashi Higa	Independent	3,542	0.50
Chōsuke Yara	Kariyushi Club	2,467	0.35
Masahiro Sueyoshi	Independent	2,270	0.32

=== Fukushima Prefecture ===
The 2026 Fukushima gubernatorial election was held on 25 October 2026.

Date	Before election		After election	
Date	Governor	Party	Governor	Party
25 October 2026	Masao Uchibori	Independent	Masao Uchibori	Independent

Candidates	Party	Votes	%
Masao Uchibori (Incumbent)	Independent	585,641	90.76
Tomoko Oyamada	JCP	36,839	5.71
Yudai Endo	Independent	9,460	1.47
Hidemitsu Tsukagoshi	Independent	4,391	0.68
Jun Kanayama	Independent	3,005	0.47
Kunihiko Hasenuma	Independent	2,987	0.46
Shoichi Fujimoto	Independent	2,927	0.45

=== Ehime Prefecture ===
The 2026 Ehime gubernatorial election was held on 15 November 2026.

Date	Before election		After election	
Date	Governor	Party	Governor	Party
15 November 2026	Tokihiro Nakamura	Independent	Tokihiro Nakamura	Independent

Candidate	Party	Votes	%
Tokihiro Nakamura (Incumbent)	Independent	382,623	84.76
Hiroyuki Miyazawa	Independent	43,706	9.68
Tsukasa Wada	Independent	25,088	5.58

=== Saga Prefecture ===
The 2026 Saga gubernatorial election is scheduled to be held on 20 December 2026.

Candidate	Party	Votes	%
Takayoshi Yoshida	Independent		
Yukari Yoshida	Independent		
Yoshinori Yamaguchi (Incumbent)	Independent		

=== Miyazaki Prefecture ===
The 2026 Miyazaki gubernatorial election is scheduled to be held on 27 December 2026.

Candidate	Party	Votes	%
Takahiro Migimatsu	Independent		
Shunji Kōno (Incumbent)	Independent		
Hideo Higashikokubaru	Independent		

== Mayoral ==
=== January ===
Legend:

- R - Re-elected
- N - Newcomer

Date	City/Town/Village	Prefecture	Winner	Ref
12 January	Maebashi	Ibaraki Prefecture	Akira Ogawa (Indp) (R)	(Note: She resigned as mayor of Maebashi in November 2025.)
17 January	Wassamu	Hokkaido Prefecture	Koichiro Nakahara (Indp) N	
18 January	Ninohe	Iwate Prefecture	Ichio Itsuka (Indp) (N)	
18 January	Iwaizumi	Iwate Prefecture	Makoto Sasaki (Indp) (N)	
18 January	Minamisoma	Fukushima Prefecture	Kazuo Monma (Indp) (R)	
18 January	Azumino	Nagano Prefecture	Eiki Nakayama (Indp) (N)	(Note: Uncontested election)
18 January	Tosashimizu	Kochi Prefecture	Tetsuya Okazaki (Indp) (N)	
18 January	Makurazaki	Kagoshima Prefecture	Yoshinari Maeda (Indp) (R)	
18 January	Kusatsu	Gunma Prefecture	Kimio Miyazaki (Indp) (N)	
18 January	Chonan	Chiba Prefecture	Sadao Hirano (Indp) (R)	
18 January	Otaki	Chiba Prefecture	Noboru Hirabayashi (Indp) (R)	
18 January	Takamori	Nagano Prefecture	Teruhiro Mibu (Indp) (R)	
18 January	Takagi	Nagano Prefecture	Fumihiko Sato (Indp) (N)	
18 January	Satosho	Okayama Prefecture	Isao Akagi (Indp) (N)	
18 January	Katsuura	Tokushima Prefecture	Takenori Nogami (Indp) (R)	
18 January	Kitajima	Tokushima Prefecture	Yasuhiro Furukawa (Indp) (R)	
25 January	Hokuto	Hokkaido Prefecture	Tatsuo Ikeda (Indp) (R)	
25 January	Hanamaki	Iwate Prefecture	Masaru Ohara	
25 January	Shiwa	Iwate Prefecture	Kamata Sen'ichi (Indp) (N)	
25 January	Hirono	Iwate Prefecture	Masayoshi Okamoto (Indp) (R)	
25 January	Kitakata	Fukushima Prefecture	Chūichi Endo (Indp) (R)	
25 January	Date	Fukushima Prefecture	Hiroyuki Suda (Indp) (R)	
25 January	Honjo	Saitama Prefecture	Yoshida Nobuyoshi (Indp) (R)	
25 January	Fukaya	Saitama Prefecture	Susumu Kojima (Indp) (R)	
25 January	Kamikawa	Saitama Prefecture	Akira Sakurazawa (Indp) (R)	
25 January	Taki	Mie Prefecture	Hisayuki Tsutsui (Indp) (N)	
25 January	Kiho	Mie Prefecture	Mikiya Mukai (Indp) (N)	
25 January	Hadano	Kanagawa Prefecture	Masakazu Takahashi (Indp) (R)	
25 January	Gosen	Niigata Prefecture	Masayuki Tanabe (Indp) (R)	
25 January	Awara	Fukui Prefecture	Mori Noritsugu (Indp) (R)	
25 January	Minokamo	Gifu Prefecture	Hiroto Fujii (Indp) (R)	
25 January	Susono	Shizuoka Prefecture	Yū Murata (Indp) (R)	
25 January	Ayabe	Kyoto Prefecture	Gentaro Shikata (Indp) (N)	
25 January	Kaizuka	Osaka Prefecture	Jiro Ushio (One Osaka) (N)	
25 January	Mitoyo	Kagawa Prefecture	Akishi Yamashita (Indp) (R)	
25 January	Konan	Kochi Prefecture	Gota Hamada (Indp) (R)	
25 January	Nakatosa	Kochi Prefecture	Hiromitsu Ikeda (Indp) (R)	
25 January	Kurume	Fukuoka Prefecture	Shingo Haraguchi (Indp) (R)	
25 January	Ureshino	Saga Prefecture	Takuya Yamaguchi (Indp) (N)	
25 January	Matsuura	Nagasaki Prefecture	Yoshiyasu Tomoda (Indp) (R)	
25 January	Miyazaki	Miyazaki Prefecture	Tomonori Kiyoyama (Indp) (R)	
25 January	Kanoya	Kagoshima Prefecture	Takuo Gohara (Indp) (N)	
25 January	Ibusuki	Kagoshima Prefecture	Akiji Uchikoshi (Indp) (R)	
25 January	Nago	Okinawa Prefecture	Taketoyo Toguchi (Indp) (R)	
25 January	Yaese	Okinawa Prefecture	Yasuhiro Arakaki (Indp) (R)	
25 January	Nanbu	Aomori Prefecture	Kudo Sukenao (Indp) (R)	
25 January	Misato	Miyagi Prefecture	Seiichi Aizawa (Indp) (R)	
25 January	Tako	Chiba Prefecture	Tomiko Hirayama (Indp) (R)	
25 January	Tateyama	Toyama Prefecture	Takayuki Funahashi (Indp) (R)	
25 January	Anamizu	Ishikawa Prefecture	Mitsuteru Yoshimura (Indp) (R)	
25 January	Kamitonda	Wakayama Prefecture	Makoto Okuda (Indp) (N)	
25 January	Kotoura	Tottori Prefecture	Mariko Fukumoto (Indp) (R)	
25 January	Chikujo	Fukuoka Prefecture	Teruo Furuichi (Indp) (N)	
25 January	Kusu	Oita Prefecture	Masakazu Yadotori (Indp) (R)	
25 January	Soni	Nara Prefecture	Tadahiro Hosoya (Indp) (N)	
25 January	Kuma	Kumamoto Prefecture	Yoshikazu Oiwa (Indp) (N)	

=== February ===
Legend:

- R - Re-elected
- N - Newcomer

Date	City/Town/Village	Prefecture	Result	Ref
1 February	Takahagi	Ibaraki Prefecture	Natsunori Obe (Indp) (R)	
1 February	Kawaguchi	Saitama Prefecture	Yuriko Okamura (Indp) (N)	
1 February	Gifu	Gifu Prefecture	Masanao Shibahashi (Indp) (R)	
1 February	Kinokawa	Wakayama Prefecture	Ken Kishimoto (Indp) (R)	
1 February	Aridagawa	Wakayama Prefecture	Sakato Tokuhiko (Indp) (N)	
1 February	Higashihiroshima	Hiroshima Prefecture	Hironori Takagaki (Indp) (R)	
1 February	Itoshima	Fukuoka Prefecture	Yuji Tsukigata (Indp) (R)	
1 February	Shibushi	Kagoshima Prefecture	Shimodaira Haruyuki (Indp) (R)	
1 February	Odai	Mie Prefecture	Hiromi Uese (Indp) (N)	
1 February	Misato	Miyazaki Prefecture	Nagao Taku (Indp) (N)	
1 February	Otaki	Nagano Prefecture	Michihiro Koshihara (Indp) (R)	
8 February	Osaka	Osaka Prefecture	Hideyuki Yokoyama (One Osaka) (R)	
8 February	Sosa	Chiba Prefecture	Yasuyuki Miyauchi (Indp) (R)	
8 February	Namerikawa	Toyama Prefecture	Tatsuo Mizuno (Indp) (N)	
8 February	Echizen	Fukui Prefecture	Toru Hirabayashi (Indp) (N)	
8 February	Nagahama	Shiga Prefecture	Nobuyoshi Asami (Indp) (R)	
8 February	Tsuyama	Okayama Prefecture	Satoshi Mitsui (Indp) (N)	
8 February	Minamata	Kumamoto Prefecture	Toshiharu Kataoka (Indp) (R)	
8 February	Rifu	Miyagi Prefecture	Yutaka Kumagai (Indp) (R)	
8 February	Sakai	Ibaraki Prefecture	Masahiro Hashimoto (Indp) (R)	
8 February	Tokigawa	Saitama Prefecture	Sakae Maeda (Indp) (N)	
8 February	Ono	Gifu Prefecture	Kozo Usami (Indp) (R)	
8 February	Wakasa	Tottori Prefecture	Motoharu Kamikawa (Indp) (R)	
8 February	Hino	Tottori Prefecture	Hiromu Kondo (Indp) (N)	
8 February	Yomitan	Okinawa Prefecture	Atsushi Iha (Indp) (N)	
15 February	Rumoi	Hokkaido Prefecture	Katsumi Masuda (Indp) (N)	
15 February	Yotsukaido	Chiba Prefecture	Yosuke Suzuki (Indp) (R)	
15 February	Machida	Tokyo Metropolis	Koji Inagaki (Indp) (N)	
15 February	Rokkasho	Aomori Prefecture	Takaharu Hashimoto (Indp) (N)	
15 February	Umi	Fukuoka Prefecture	Shigenobu Yasukawa (Indp) (R)	
22 February	Yukuhashi	Fukuoka Prefecture	Masahiro Kudo (Indp) (R)	
22 February	Komaki	Aichi Prefecture	Masaki Amano (Indp) (N)	
22 February	Kamoenai	Hokkaido Prefecture	Masayuki Takahashi (Indp) (R)	
22 February	Ami	Ibaraki Prefecture	Shigeru Chiba (Indp) (R)	
22 February	Eiheiji	Fukui Prefecture	Hisamitsu Kawai (Indp) (R)	
22 February	Aisho	Shiga Prefecture	Kunitomo Arimura (Indp) (R)	
22 February	Nankan	Kumamoto Prefecture	Yasuhiko Sato (Indp) (R)	

=== March ===
Legend:

- R - Re-elected
- N - Newcomer

Date	City/Town/Village	Prefecture	Result	Ref
1 March	Oirase	Aomori Prefecture	Mitsuhisa Narita (Indp) (N)	
1 March	Kanegasaki	Iwate Prefecture	Fumihiro Takahashi (Indp) (N)	
1 March	Nishigo	Fukushima Prefecture	Hiroshi Takahashi (Indp) (R)	
1 March	Koumi	Nagano Prefecture	Hiroshi Kurosawa (Indp) (R)	
1 March	Shintomi	Miyazaki Prefecture	Soji Kojima (Indp) (R)	

=== April ===
Legend:

- R – Re-elected
- N – Newcomer

Date	City/Town/Village	Prefecture	Result	Ref
5 April	Tsubata	Ishikawa Prefecture		
5 April	Yosano	Kyoto Prefecture		
5 April	Kin	Okinawa Prefecture		
5 April	Wake	Okayama Prefecture		
5 April	Esashi	Hokkaido Prefecture		
5 April	Kuriyama	Hokkaido Prefecture		

=== June ===
Legend:

- R – Re-elected
- N – Newcomer

Date	City/Town/Village	Prefecture	Result	Ref
7 June	Iwate	Iwate Prefecture		
7 June	Godo	Gifu Prefecture		
7 June	Nakano	Tokyo Metropolis		
7 June	Iwanuma	Miyagi Prefecture		

== See also ==
- 2026 in Japan
- Other elections in Japan
  - 2026 Japanese general election
