= 2026 Osaka mayoral election =

2026 election for Governor of Osaka

- 8 February 2026

| Candidate | Hideyuki Yokoyama | Eitaro Chujo | Eitaro Nakajo |
| Party | One Osaka | Independent | Independent |
| Popular vote | 830,257 | 97,105 | 97,105 |
| Percentage | 77.7% | 9.2% | 9.1% |
Mayor of Osaka before election
Hideyuki Yokoyama
One Osaka
Elected Mayor of Osaka
Hideyuki Yokoyama
One Osaka

The 2026 Osaka mayoral election was held on 8 February 2026 to elect the mayor of Osaka, alongside the Osaka gubernatorial election and Japanese general election. It was triggered by the resignation of Mayor Hideyuki Yokoyama, who sought re-election as a mandate for a third referendum on the Osaka Metropolis Plan.

== Background ==
The Osaka Metropolis Plan was a long-term goal of the Osaka Restoration Association (One Osaka), which Yokoyama belonged to. The plan would merge Osaka Prefecture into a metropolis akin to Tokyo. Referendums in 2015 and 2020 rejected it by narrow margins, and Yokoyama was elected mayor of Osaka City in 2023.

In late 2024, the Japan Innovation Party, One Osaka's national affiliate, entered a governing agreement with the Liberal Democratic Party. Part of the agreement was a plan to designate a secondary capital for Japan. In order to enhance the chances of Osaka being selected, Yokoyama and the party decided to revive the Metropolis Plan.

On 16 January 2026, Yokoyama and Osaka governor Hirofumi Yoshimura announced that they were both resigning from their posts in order to seek a mandate for a third referendum.

As Yokoyama resigned voluntarily without a vote of no confidence or recall, this election was considered a denaoshi (出直し; "fresh start") election (ja) under article 259/2 of the electoral law. If he won reelection, the previous electoral cycle would be maintained and the next regular election would be due in April 2027; any other winner would begin a full four-year term.

== Candidates ==
Incumbent Yokoyama sought re-election. Besides his Japan Innovation Party, none of the major national political parties ran or endorsed candidates.

| Candidate | Party | Background |
|---|---|---|
| Hideyuki Yokoyama (age 44) | One Osaka | Mayor of Osaka (since 2023); Member of the Osaka Prefectural Assembly (2011–2023) |
| Eitaro Chujo (age 56) | Independent | Real estate company manager |
| Shin Adachi (Nepensa) (age 51) | Independent | Artist |
| Tomohiro Chiyo (age 58) | Independent | Real estate businessman |
| Shigenori Hayashi (age 52) | Independent | Chairman of an incorporated foundation |

== Results ==
Yokoyama was reelected as mayor.

== See also ==
- 2026 Japanese local elections
- 2026 Osaka gubernatorial election - held on the same day
- 2026 Japanese general election - held on the same day
- 2026 Yamaguchi gubernatorial election - held on the same day
- 2026 Nagasaki gubernatorial election - held on the same day
