= 2022 Niigata gubernatorial election =

- May 29, 2022
- Turnout: 49.64%
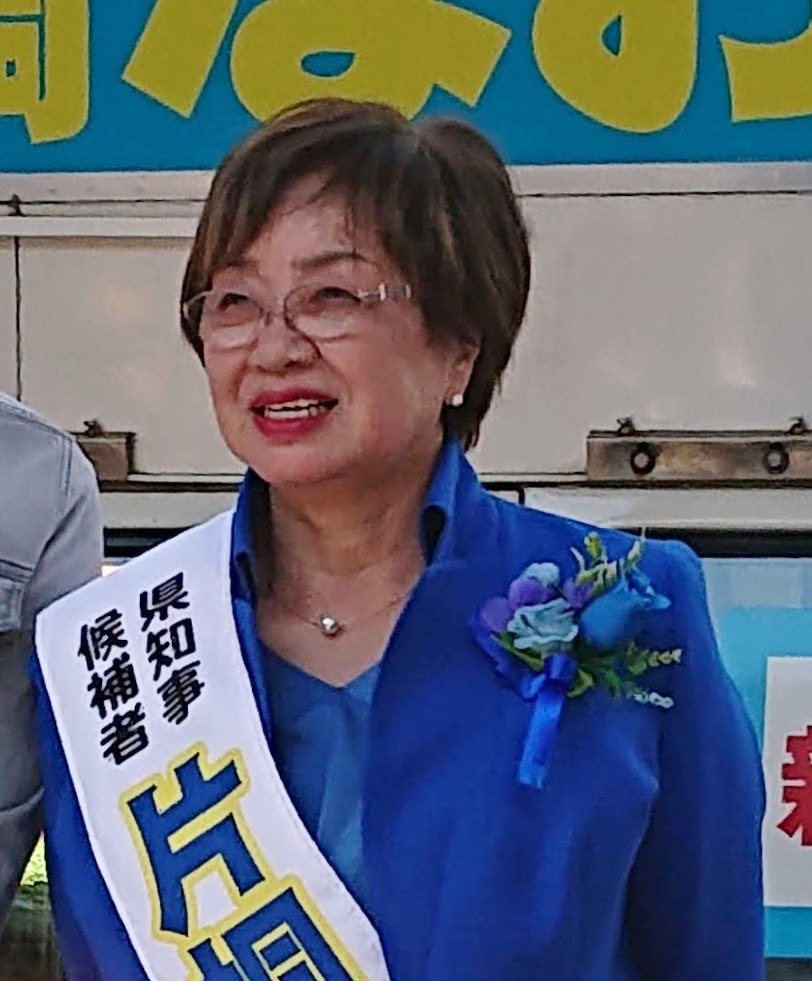
Candidate	Hideyo Hanazumi	Nahomi Katagiri
Party	Independent	Independent
Popular vote	703,694	203,845
Percentage	77.5%	22.5%
Governor before election
Hideyo Hanazumi
Independent
Elected Governor
Hideyo Hanazumi
Independent

The 2022 Niigata gubernatorial election was held on 29 May 2022. Hideyo Hanazumi was re-elected Governor of Niigata Prefecture.
