= 2026 Osaka gubernatorial election =

2026 election for Governor of Osaka

- 8 February 2026
- Registered: 7,177,655
- Turnout: 56.4% (▲9.4 pp)

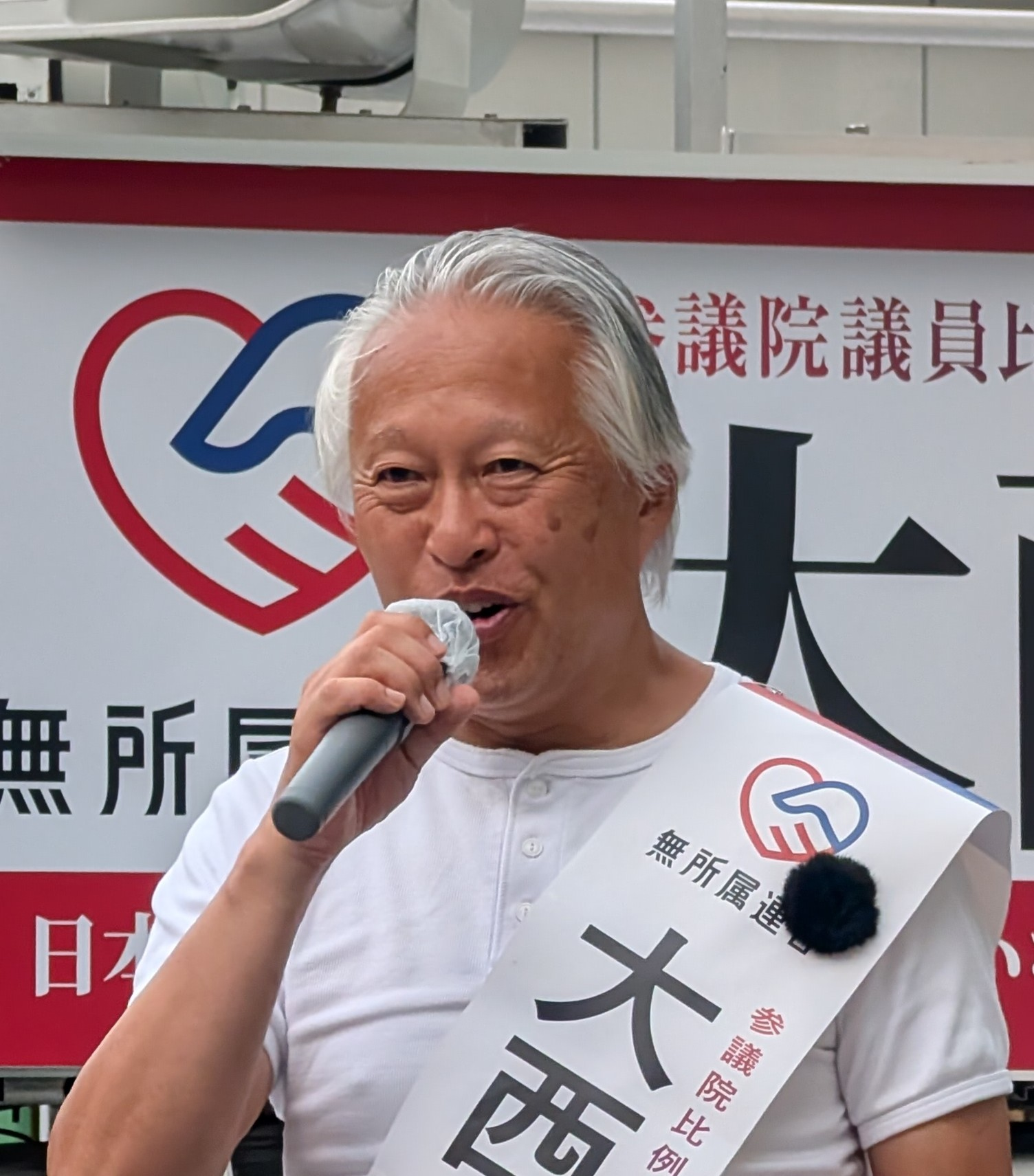
Candidate	Hirofumi Yoshimura	Tsuneki Onishi
Party	One Osaka	Independent
Popular vote	3,024,106	452,807
Percentage	83.2%	12.5%
Governor of Osaka Prefecture before election
Hirofumi Yoshimura
One Osaka
Elected Governor of Osaka Prefecture
Hirofumi Yoshimura
One Osaka

The 2026 Osaka gubernatorial election was held on 8 February 2026 to elect the governor of Osaka Prefecture. It was held alongside the Osaka mayoral election and the 2026 Japanese general election. The election was triggered by the resignation of Governor Hirofumi Yoshimura, who sought re-election to secure a public mandate for a third referendum on the Osaka Metropolis Plan.

Incumbent governor Hirofumi Yoshimura of One Osaka faced independent candidates Tsuneki Onishi and Tamotsu Natto. Yoshimura was re-elected with 83.2% of the vote, defeating Onishi, who received 12.5%, and Natto, who received 4.3%.

== Background ==
The Osaka Metropolis Plan was a long-term goal of the Osaka Restoration Association (One Osaka), which Yoshimura belonged to. The plan would merge Osaka Prefecture into a metropolis akin to Tokyo. Referendums in 2015 and 2020 rejected it by narrow margins, and Yoshimura was elected governor of Osaka Prefecture in 2023.

In late 2024, the Japan Innovation Party, One Osaka's national affiliate, entered a governing agreement with the Liberal Democratic Party. Part of the agreement was a plan to designate a secondary capital for Japan. In order to enhance the chances of Osaka being selected, Yokoyama and the party decided to revive the Metropolis Plan.

On 16 January 2026, Yoshimura and Osaka mayor Hideyuki Yokoyama announced that they were both resigning from their posts in order to seek a mandate for a third referendum.

As Yoshimura resigned voluntarily without a vote of no confidence or recall, this election was considered a denaoshi (出直し, 'fresh start') election (ja) under article 259/2 of the electoral law. If he won reelection, the previous electoral cycle would be maintained and the next regular election would be due in April 2027; any other winner would begin a full four-year term.

== Candidates ==
Incumbent Yoshimura was seeking re-election. 44-year-old Tamotsu Natto, the head of a public-interest foundation, and 61-year-old Tsuneki Onishi, leader of the political group Independent Alliance, also filed to run. Onishi opposes the metropolis plan while Natto stated he will only pass it if 90% of voters approve. Besides Yoshimura's Nippon Ishin party, none of the major national political parties ran or endorsed candidates.

Candidate	Party	Background
Hirofumi Yoshimura (age 50)	One Osaka; Nippon Ishin no Kai	Governor of Osaka Prefecture (2019–26); Mayor of Osaka (2015–19); Member of the House of Representatives (2014–15)
Tamotsu Natto (age 44)	Independent	Public-interest foundation chairman
Tsuneki Onishi (age 61)	Independent	Co-president of the Independent Alliance

== Results ==
Yoshimura was reelected as governor.

Candidate	Party	Votes	%
Hirofumi Yoshimura	One Osaka	3,024,106	83.2
Tsuneki Onishi	Independent	452,807	12.5
Tamotsu Natto	Independent	155,855	4.3
Total		3,632,768	100.0
Invalid		417,480	10.3
Turnout		4,050,248	56.4
Registered voters		7,177,655	
Source: 1, 2

== See also ==
- 2026 Japanese local elections
- 2026 Osaka mayoral election - held on the same day
- 2026 Japanese general election - held on the same day
- 2026 Yamaguchi gubernatorial election - held on the same day
- 2026 Nagasaki gubernatorial election - held on the same day
