= Hideyo Hanazumi =

Japanese politician

- 花角 英世
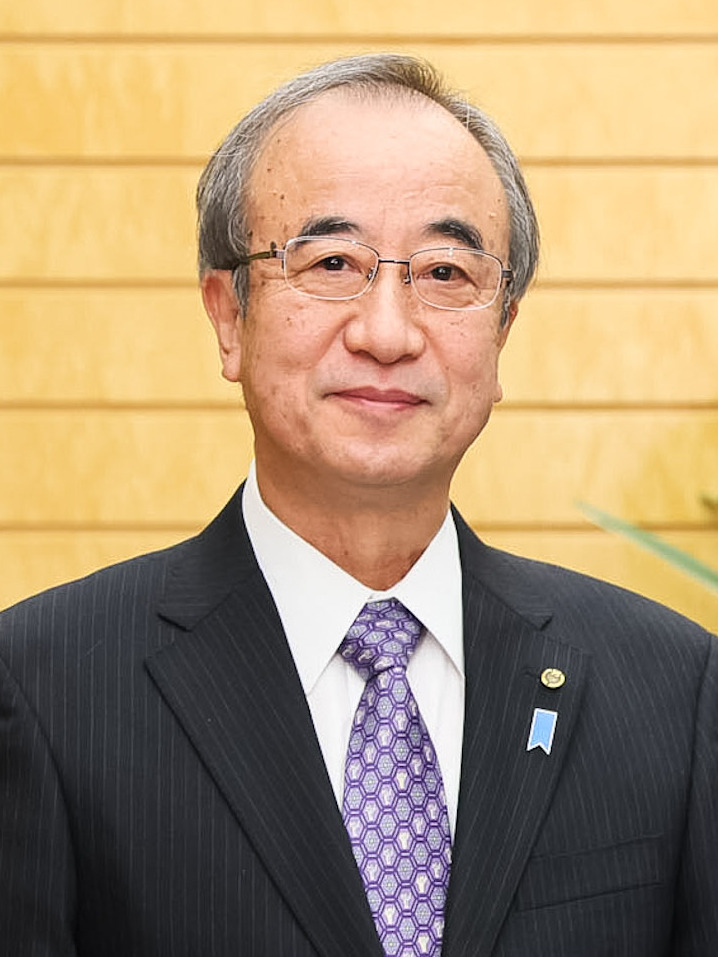
- Hanazumi in 2025

Governor of Niigata Prefecture
- Incumbent
- Assumed office 12 June 2018
- Monarchs: Akihito; Naruhito
- Preceded by: Ryuichi Yoneyama

Personal details
- Born: 22 May 1958 (age 68) Kanai, Niigata, Japan
- Party: Independent
- Education: University of Tokyo
- Profession: Bureaucrat

Hideyo Hanazumi (花角 英世, Hanazumi Hideyo; born 22 May 1958) is a Japanese politician serving as the Governor of Niigata Prefecture, following his election in June 2018. Prior to his election, Hanazumi served as a vice commandant in the Japan Coast Guard and as Vice Governor of Niigata.

== Governor of Niigata ==
In the race to become Niigata's governor, Hanazumi was backed by the ruling Liberal Democratic Party (LDP) and Komeito, in a face-off against opposition-backed candidate Chikako Ikeda. Throughout his campaign, Hanazumi tried to distance himself from the ruling coalition, in a bid to gain support from a wider range of voters. The ruling coalition has faced allegations of favoritism involving two school operators. In the election, Hanazumi defeated Ikeda by a narrow 3.4% margin.

In contrast to the pro-nuclear policies of the LDP and Komeito, Hanazumi vowed to maintain a cautious approach to the restart of the Kashiwazaki-Kariwa Nuclear Power Plant, effectively following the policy of his opposition-supported predecessor.

He was re-elected twice, first in the 2022 Niigata gubernatorial election, and again in the 2026 Niigata gubernatorial election.
