= 2026 Japanese general election =

- 8 February 2026

All 465 seats in the House of Representatives 233 seats needed for a majority
- Opinion polls
- Registered: 103,211,224 (▼0.64%)
- Turnout: 56.26% (▲2.41pp; Const. votes); 56.25% (▲2.40pp; PR votes)
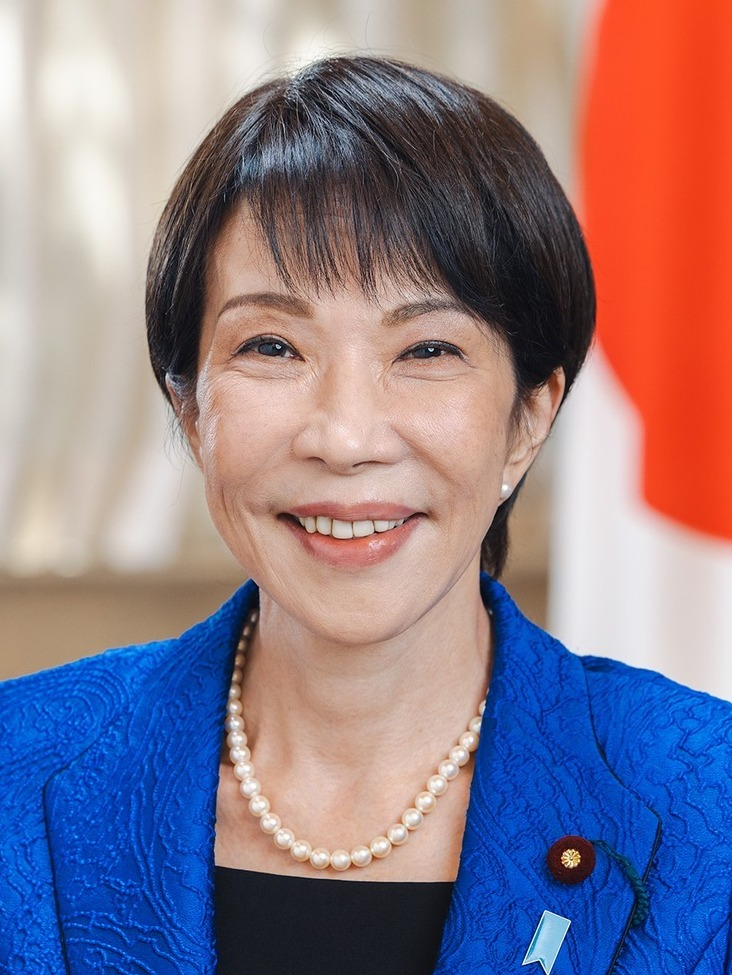

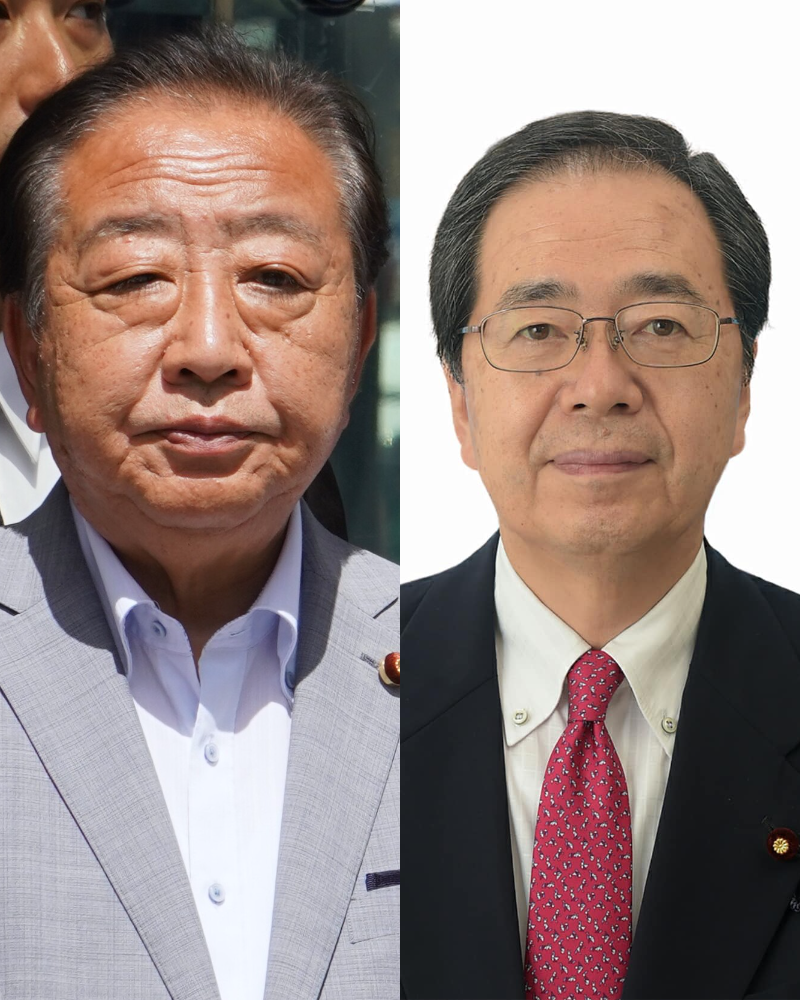

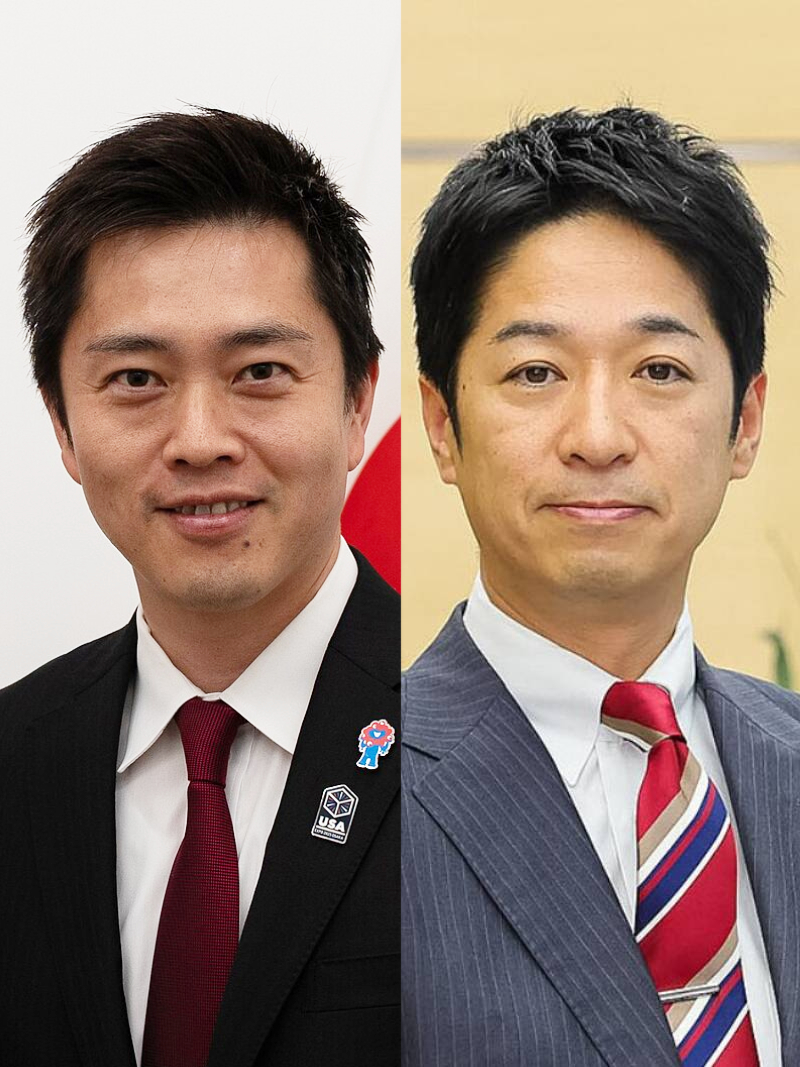

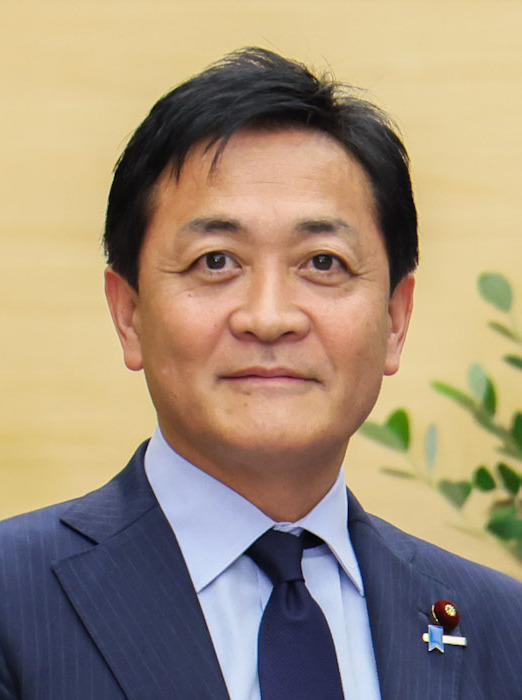

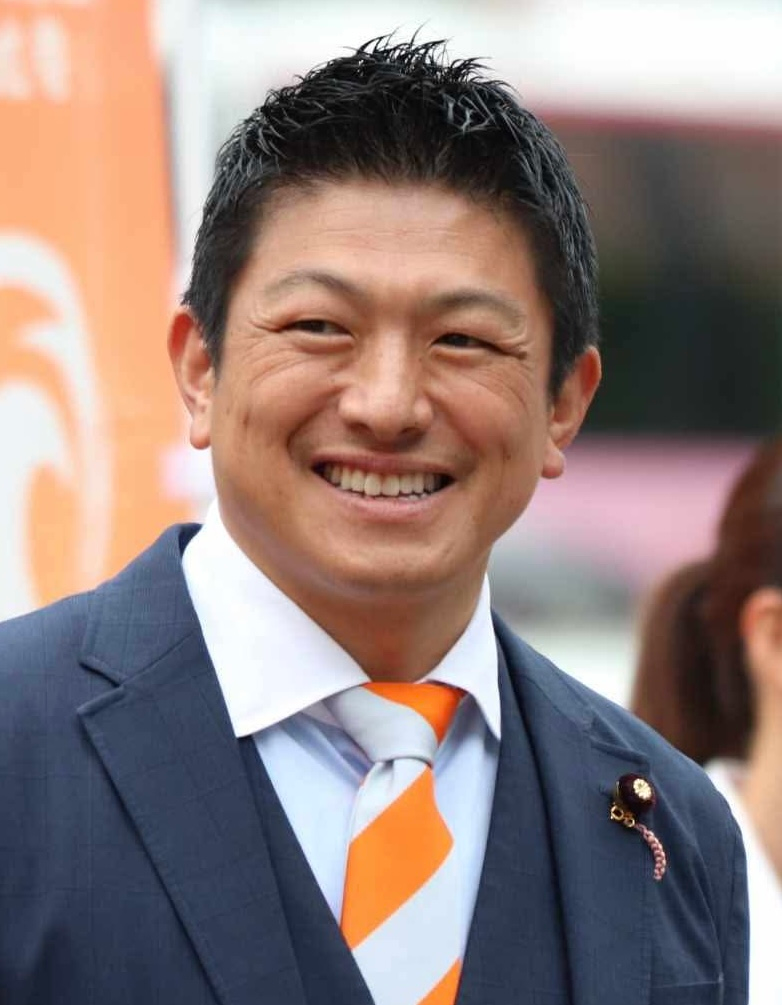

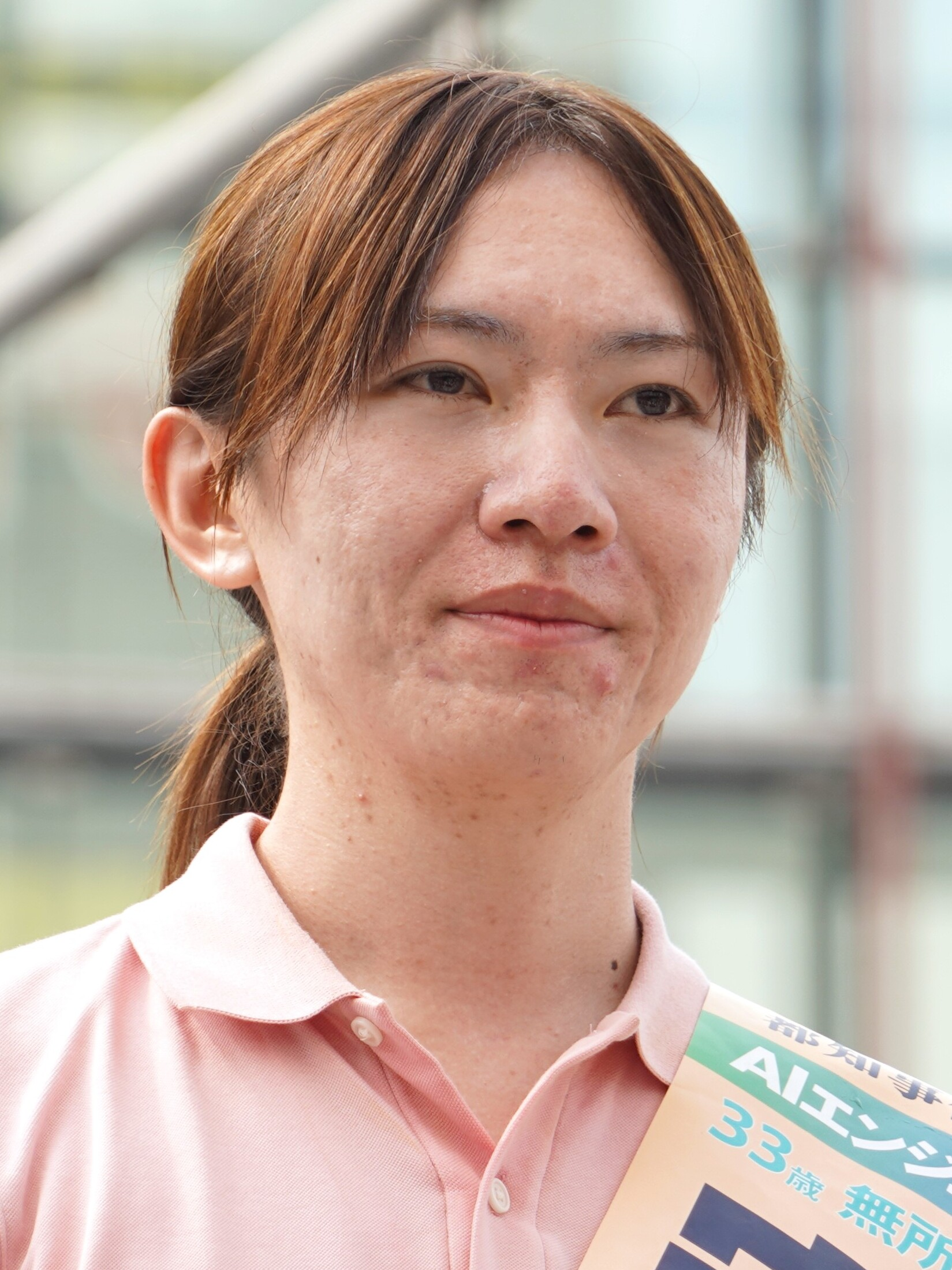

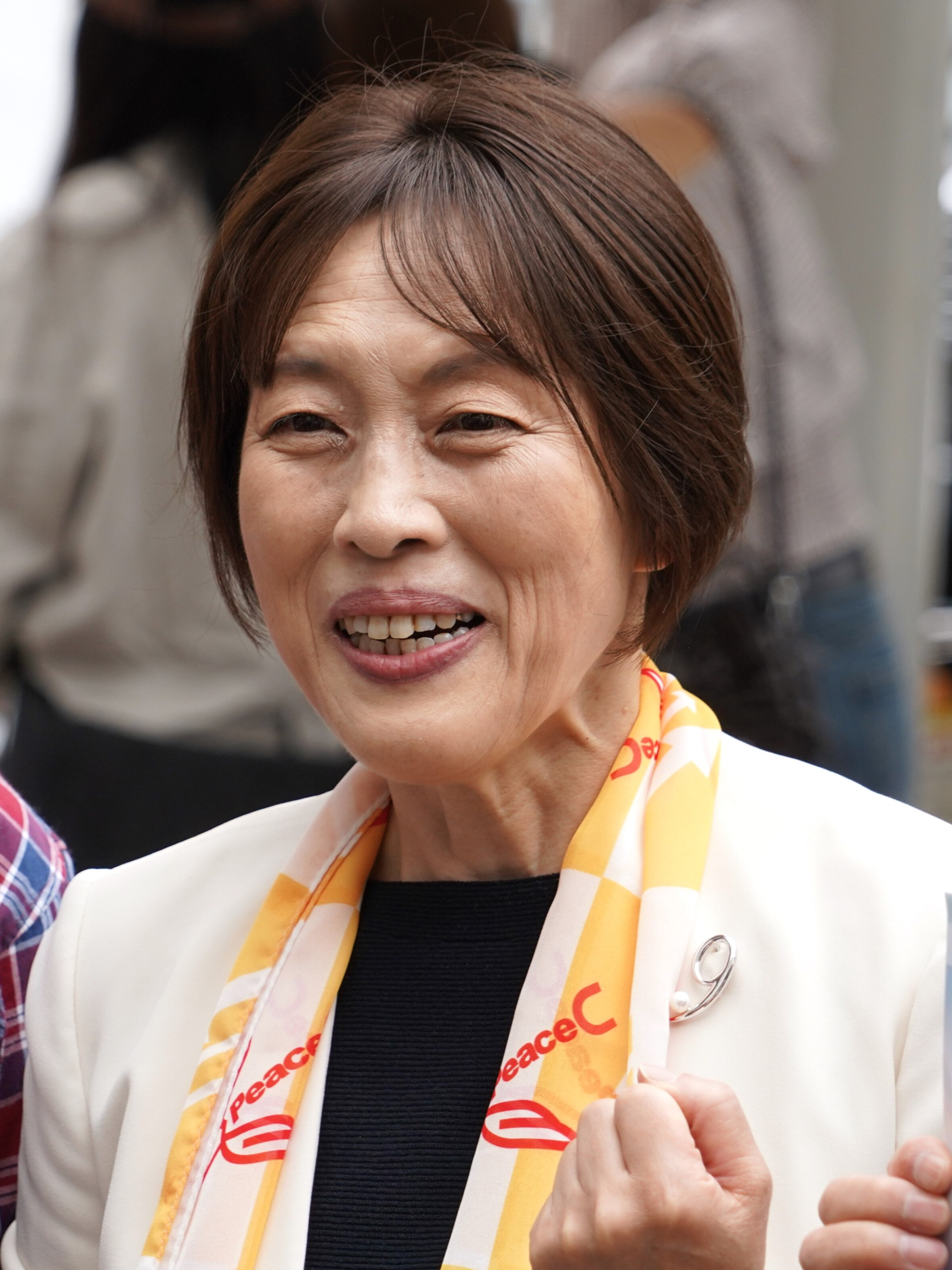

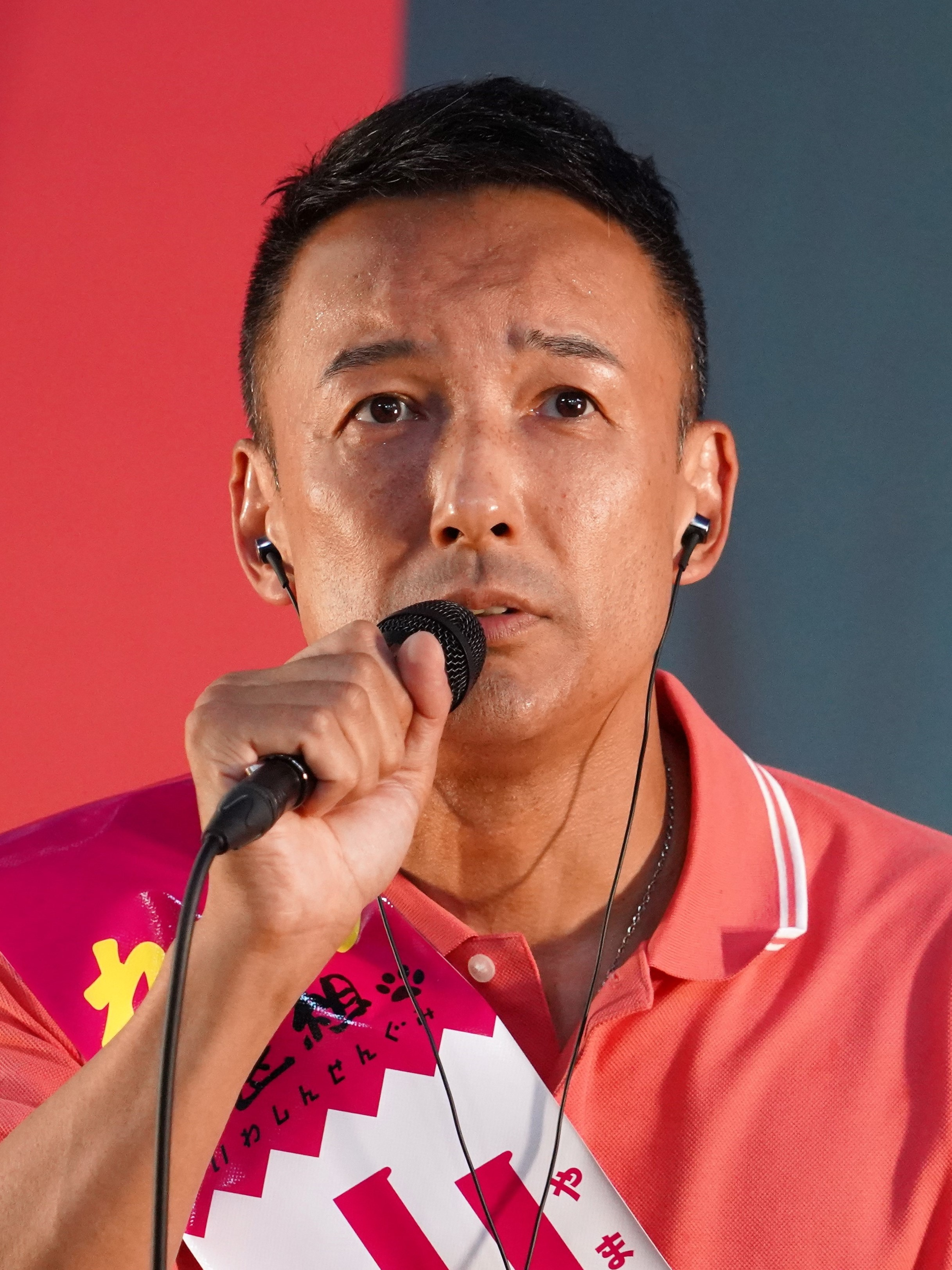

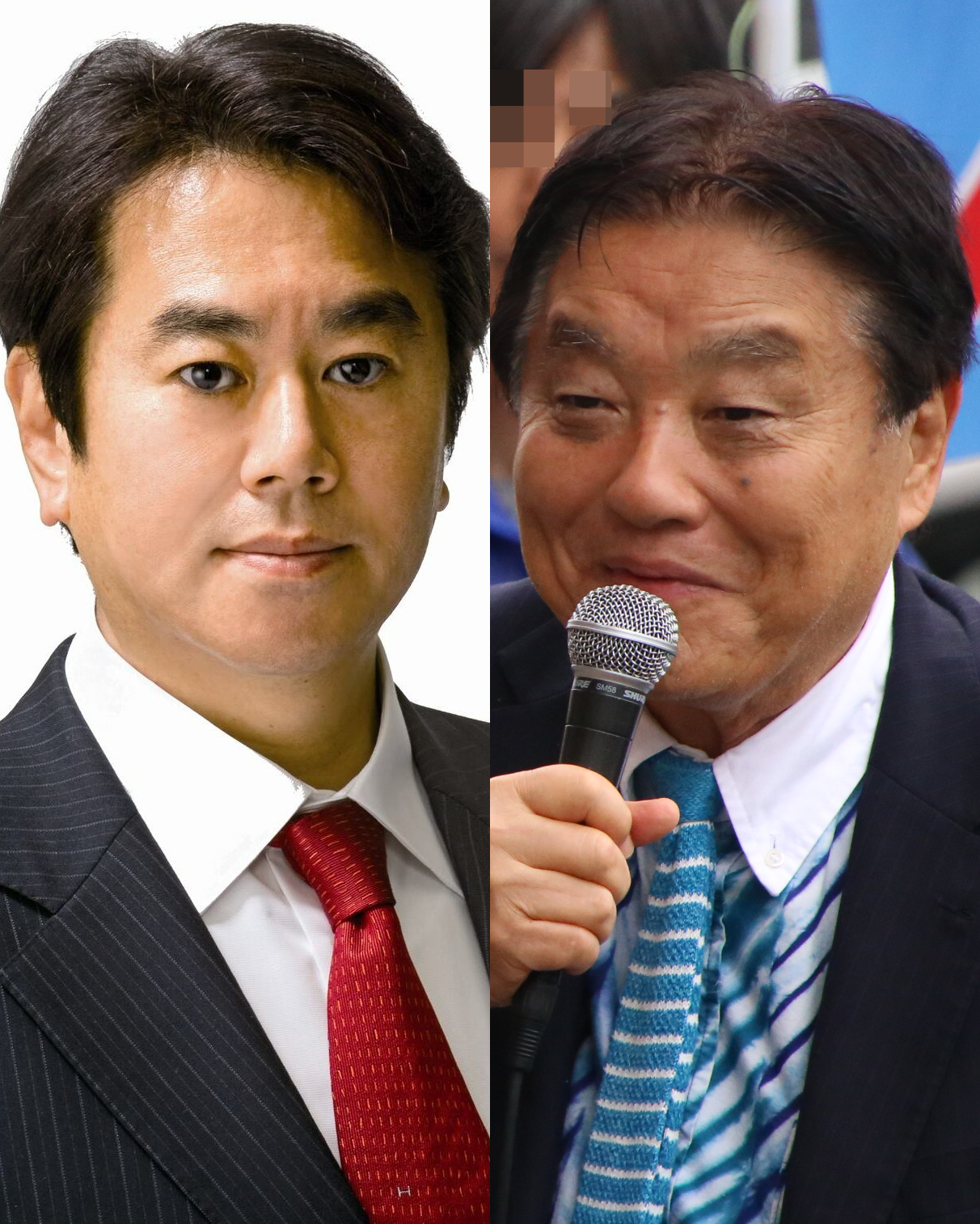
	First party	Second party	Third party
Leader	Sanae Takaichi	Yoshihiko Noda; Tetsuo Saito	Hirofumi Yoshimura; Fumitake Fujita
Party	LDP	Centrist Reform	Ishin
Leader since	4 October 2025	15 January 2026	1 December 2024; 8 August 2025
Leader's seat	Nara 2nd	Chiba 14th Chūgoku PR	Did not stand (Note: Yoshimura ran in the concurrent 2026 Osaka gubernatorial election); Osaka 12th
Last election	191 seats	172 seats (Note: As CDP and Komeito)	38 seats
Seats before	198	167	34
Seats won	316	49	36
Seat change	▲125	▼123	▼2
Constituency vote	27,710,493	12,209,686	3,742,161
% and swing	49.09% (▲10.63pp)	21.63% (▼8.73pp)	6.63% (▼4.52pp)
Regional vote	21,026,139	10,438,831	4,943,330
% and swing	36.72% (▲9.99pp)	18.23% (▼13.90pp)	8.63% (▼0.73pp)
	Fourth party	Fifth party	Sixth party
Leader	Yuichiro Tamaki	Sohei Kamiya	Takahiro Anno
Party	DPP	Sanseitō	Team Mirai
Leader since	7 May 2018	17 March 2020	8 May 2025
Leader's seat	Kagawa 2nd	Did not stand (Note: Sits in the House of Councillors for the national PR block)	Did not stand
Last election	28 seats	3 seats	Did not exist
Seats before	27	2	0
Seats won	28	15	11
Seat change	Steady	▲12	▲11
Constituency vote	4,243,282	3,924,223	156,853
% and swing	7.52% (▲3.19pp)	6.95% (▲4.45pp)	0.28% (New)
Regional vote	5,572,951	4,260,620	3,813,349
% and swing	9.73% (▼1.59pp)	7.44% (▲4.01pp)	6.66% (New)
	Seventh party	Eighth party	Ninth party
Leader	Tomoko Tamura	Taro Yamamoto	Kazuhiro Haraguchi; Takashi Kawamura
Party	JCP	Reiwa	Genzei–Yukoku
Leader since	18 January 2024	1 April 2019	24 January 2026
Leader's seat	Tokyo PR	Did not stand	Saga 1st (lost re-election); Aichi 1st
Last election	8 seats	9 seats	Did not exist
Seats before	8	8	5
Seats won	4	1	1
Seat change	▼4	▼8	▲1
Constituency vote	2,283,885	255,496	354,617
% and swing	4.05% (▼2.76pp)	0.45% (▼0.35pp)	0.63% (New)
Regional vote	2,519,807	1,672,499	814,874
% and swing	4.40% (▼1.76pp)	2.92% (▼4.06pp)	1.42% (New)
- Districts and PR districts
Prime Minister before election
Sanae Takaichi
LDP
Elected Prime Minister
Sanae Takaichi
LDP

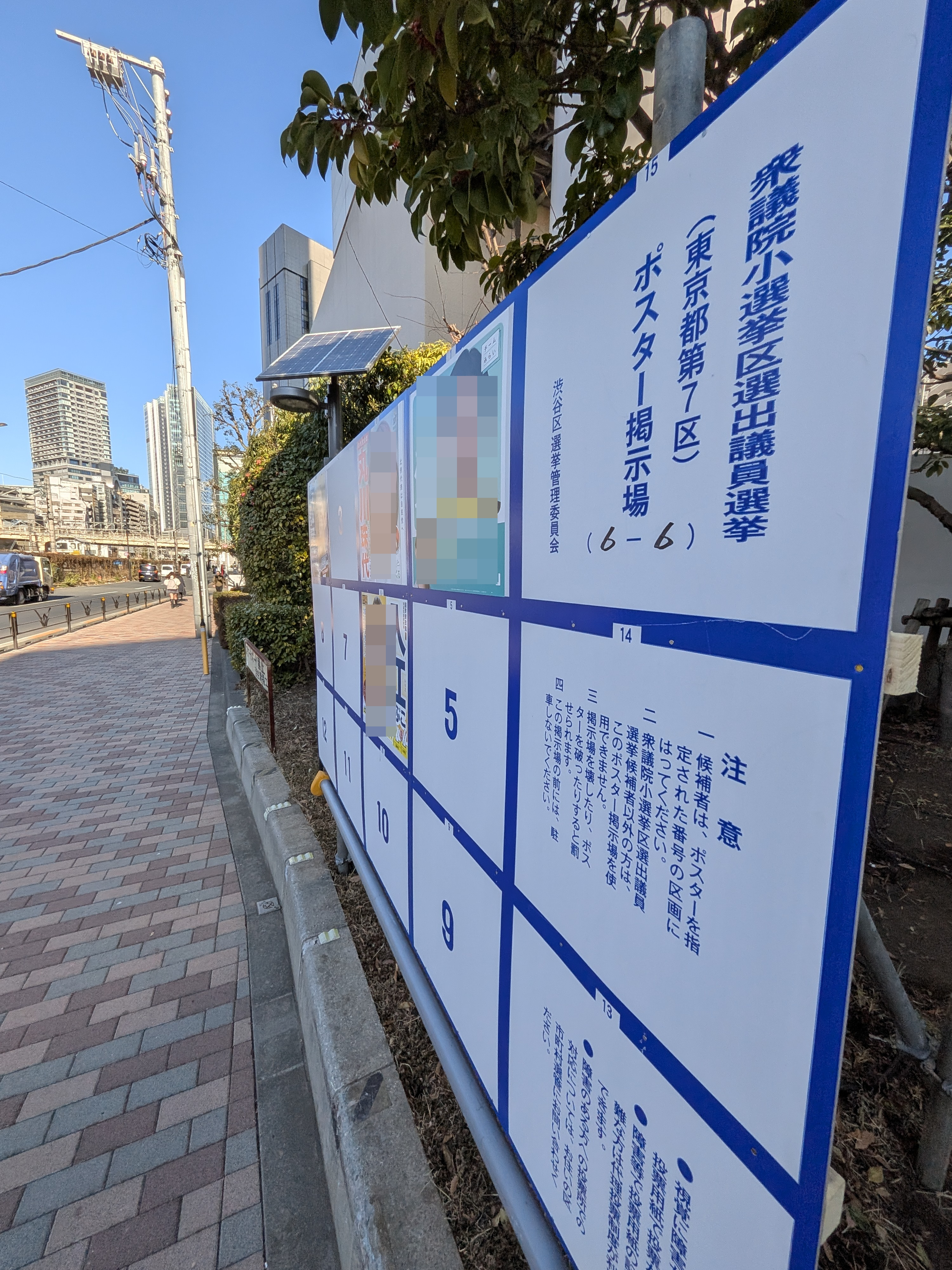
Election board in Shibuya, Tokyo

Early general elections were held in Japan on 8 February 2026 in all constituencies, including proportional blocks, to elect all 465 seats of the House of Representatives, the lower house of the National Diet.

The election took place nearly four months into Sanae Takaichi's tenure as Prime Minister of Japan, which began on 21 October after she won the 2025 Liberal Democratic Party presidential election and formed the Liberal Democratic Party–Japan Innovation Party coalition (LDP–JIP). The election also saw the debut of the newly formed Centrist Reform Alliance (CRA), a new political party formed as a merger between the primary opposition Constitutional Democratic Party (CDP) and Komeito, the LDP's former longtime coalition partner. Takaichi described the election as a public referendum on her leadership as prime minister, and of the LDP–JIP coalition.

The LDP won a historic landslide victory, with the party regaining its majority in the House and setting a new postwar record for the most seats won by a single party with 316 seats. This gave the party a two-thirds supermajority in its own right, and surpassed the previous record of 308 seats won by the Democratic Party of Japan in 2009 and the LDP record of 300 seats won in 1986. Meanwhile, the CRA severely underperformed, losing more than two-thirds of its pre-election seats and leading to the resignations of party co-leaders Yoshihiko Noda and Tetsuo Saito after the election. Other parties that gained seats included the ultraconservative and far-right party Sanseitō and the new e-democracy party Team Mirai.

Analysts credited the LDP's victory to Takaichi's high personal popularity at the time of the election, particularly among young voters and conservatives who had previously defected from the party, as well as to CDP and Komeito voters who opposed their parties' merger declining to support the CRA. The Economist described the result as a personal mandate for Takaichi, and a repudiation of the CRA. The LDP's victory marked a reversal of fortune from the 2023–2024 slush fund scandal that had cost the party its majority in the previous election, with 41 of the 43 LDP candidates linked to the scandal winning their races.

== Background ==
=== Resignation of Shigeru Ishiba ===
The 2024 Japanese general election and 2025 Japanese House of Councillors election both resulted in the loss of majorities for the Liberal Democratic Party (LDP) and Komeito governing coalition under Prime Minister Shigeru Ishiba. After both elections, Ishiba invoked a parliamentary plurality in both houses, and stated that he believed the LDP had a responsibility to lead the government, as it would in most other parliamentary democracies. Pressure continued to mount on Ishiba to resign as the LDP president, but he refused and said he planned to continue serving as Prime Minister.

On 7 September, Ishiba announced that he would resign as president of the Liberal Democratic Party of Japan. Ishiba stated he sought to claim "responsibility" as party leader for losses in recent elections, and to avoid dividing the party. Ishiba's announcement effectively cancelled the emergency election process entirely. He instead instructed LDP Secretary-General Hiroshi Moriyama, whose resignation had not been accepted by Ishiba, to begin the process to hold an extraordinary presidential election. Ishiba said he determined that now was the "appropriate time" to step aside, after a written version of the Japan–U.S. tariff agreement had been finalized. Ishiba promised to continue serving as Prime Minister until a new leader was elected, and did not endorse a candidate in the subsequent election. His tenure lasted about one year. In the 2025 LDP leadership election on 5 October, Takaichi was elected as the LDP's first female president. In her first acts as party president, Takaichi appointed Tarō Asō as vice president and Shun'ichi Suzuki as secretary-general of the LDP.

=== Premiership of Sanae Takaichi ===
On 10 October, Komeito chief representative Tetsuo Saito announced that it would leave the ruling coalition, over disagreements with Takaichi's leadership and the party's handling of the 2023–2024 Japanese slush fund scandal, ending 26 years of the LDP–Komeito coalition. Following this, the vote to confirm Takaichi as prime minister was delayed to 20 October. On 20 October, Takaichi and the Japan Innovation Party (Ishin) leader Hirofumi Yoshimura agreed to sign a coalition agreement. Takaichi was elected prime minister by the Diet on 21 October, with the support of Ishin and independents, and the right-wing conservative coalition was formed.

=== Early election call ===
On 13 January 2026, it emerged that Takaichi had communicated her intention to dissolve the House of Representatives, when it re-convened on 23 January to senior LDP officials. Subsequently, the LDP instructed its prefectural chapters to register general election candidates by 19 January. Japanese national broadcaster NHK reported that the Ministry of Internal Affairs and Communications had instructed prefectural election boards to prepare for a general election. In response to an apparently leaked LDP projection of the results of an election, LDP officials said that "260 seats seems like too much in reality", and that "within the party, it's assumed that at least a simple majority of 233 seats will be won". On 19 January, Takaichi officially announced her intention to dissolve the House of Representatives on 23 January at a press conference. Campaigning would begin on 27 January, with election day beginning after polls opened on 8 February. It was the shortest election campaign in Japan's postwar history.

=== CDP–Komeito merger ===
In response to the reports of an imminent election, the CDP considered forming a new political alliance with opposition parties to run a single proportional representation list against the LDP, potentially including Komeito, who previously had a 26-year alliance with the governing LDP. The CDP also instructed its prefectural chapters to meet with Komeito's local organisations, and Diet members to seek electoral cooperation. On 14 January, it was found that the cooperation between the CDP and Komeito had begun with view to a merger of the two parties. The merged party would caucus separately in the House of Councillors, but operate as a single party in the House of Representatives, with current CDP leader Yoshihiko Noda and Komeito leader Tetsuo Saito serving as co-leaders. The merged party's proposed name was Chūdō Kaikaku (中道改革; Centrist Reform), before its official name was finalised as Chūdō Kaikaku Rengō (中道改革連合; lit. Centrist Reform Alliance) (CRA). Saito said that Noda would be named prime minister if the CRA won the election.

Komeito announced it would not contest any constituency seats in favour of running in the proportional blocks. Jiji Press created a model of the constituency seats which projected that the LDP would win 97 constituency seats and the CDP would win 139 with the results of the 2024 election. Nippon Television projected that, with a hypothetical CDP–Komeito merger, the LDP would retain just 60 of its 132 single member districts with the 2024 election. As a result of this merger, the new CRA would now have 172 seats in the National Diet, thus significantly weakening the LDP's already fragile grip on power.

== Electoral system ==
The 465 seats of the House of Representatives are contested via parallel voting. Of these, 289 members are elected in single-member constituencies using first-past-the-post voting, while 176 members are elected in 11 multi-member constituencies via party list proportional representation. Candidates from parties with legal political party-list, which requires either ≥5 Diet members or ≥1 Diet member and ≥2% of the nationwide vote in one tier of a recent national election, are allowed to stand in a constituency and be present on the party list. If they lose their constituency vote, they may still be elected in the proportionally allocated seats; however, if such a dual candidate wins less than 10% of the vote in their majoritarian constituency, they are also disqualified as a proportional candidate.

== Political parties ==
Parties		Leader(s)	Ideology	Seats		Status
Parties		Leader(s)	Ideology	Last election	At dissolution	Status
Liberal Democratic Party		Sanae Takaichi	Conservatism (Japanese)	191 / 465	198 / 465	Governing coalition
Japan Innovation Party		Hirofumi Yoshimura; Fumitake Fujita	Libertarian conservatism	38 / 465	34 / 465	Governing coalition
Centrist Reform; Alliance	Constitutional Democratic Party	Yoshihiko Noda	Centrism	148 / 465	167 / 465	Opposition
Centrist Reform; Alliance	Komeito	Tetsuo Saito	Centrism	24 / 465	167 / 465	Opposition
Democratic Party For the People		Yuichiro Tamaki	Conservatism (Japanese)	28 / 465	27 / 465	Opposition
Reiwa Shinsengumi		Taro Yamamoto	Progressivism	9 / 465	8 / 465	Opposition
Japanese Communist Party		Tomoko Tamura	Communism	8 / 465	4 / 465	Opposition
Tax Cuts Japan and Yukoku Alliance		Kazuhiro Haraguchi; Takashi Kawamura	Right-wing populism	Did not exist	5 / 465	Opposition
Sanseitō		Sohei Kamiya	Right-wing populism	3 / 465	2 / 465	Opposition
Conservative Party of Japan		Naoki Hyakuta	Ultranationalism	3 / 465	1 / 465	Opposition
Social Democratic Party		Mizuho Fukushima	Social democracy	1 / 465	0 / 465	Opposition
Independents and others		—N/a	—N/a	12 / 465	15 / 465	Mixed

Candidates by party

Source: NHK

== Campaign ==
Number of registered candidates by party
Party	Before election	Const.	PR	Running in both	Total
LDP	198	285	319	267	337
CRA	167	202	234	200	236
Ishin	34	87	86	84	89
DPP	27	102	103	101	104
JCP	8	158	23	5	176
Reiwa	8	18	25	12	31
Genyu	5	13	18	13	18
Sansei	2	182	55	47	190
CPJ	1	6	20	6	20
SDP	0	8	15	8	15
Mirai	0	6	15	6	15
CES	0	0	2	0	2
Others	0	11	–	–	11
Ind.	15	41	–	–	41
Total	465	1,119	915	749	1,285

The press conference where Takaichi announced her intention to hold an early general election

Riding on the high approval ratings of her cabinet, the snap election was seen as a power move to boost Sanae Takaichi's mandate and gain a majority in the lower house, which was only one seat away if including the Nippon Ishin No Kai. Takaichi also announced that she would resign as prime minister if the ruling bloc did not win a majority. The LDP was campaigning on its promises of increased spending, tax cuts, in the name of "responsible yet aggressive fiscal policy", and a new security strategy by abolishing the "five categories" which restricted defence equipment exports to non-combat purposes. The party also looked to tighten rules on foreign acquisition of housing and land.

Despite being the largest opposition party after the merge, the Centrist Reform Alliance (CRA) target of changing the government apparently faded into the background given the prevalent multi-party situation which made it difficult for a single party to gain a majority. The coalition aimed to accelerating political restructuring, with the possibility of the Democratic Party for the People (DPP) and part of the LDP joining the coalition after the election in mind. Komeito candidates only ran in proportional representation seats in this election, with its voters' inclination becoming a focus of attention due to the previously longstanding cooperative relationship with the LDP. The party campaigned on "putting ordinary citizens first and their livelihoods at the center" and lowering the consumption tax on food to zero, as well as the LDP slush fund scandal, by proposing stricter rules on corporate and group donations.

Nippon Ishin No Kai, LDP coalition partner, recommended LDP candidates in over 80 constituencies. The reports of an election prompted both Yoshimura (governor of Osaka Prefecture) and Hideyuki Yokoyama (mayor of Osaka) to resign from their posts with the aim of running for re-election alongside the general election, as well as to seek endorsement of the Osaka Metropolis Plan. The party said to carry out reforms that the LDP had not been able to implement, with the focus on national security, economic security and economic growth and the aim to reduce consumption tax on food to zero.

The right-leaning DPP, which gained significant ground in the 2025 Japanese House of Councillors election, pledged to ensure that everyone's take-home pay would be increased by 60,000 yen per year. It also called for consumption tax reduction to 5% until wage growth stabilised at 2% above inflation. The Japan Communist Party (JCP) called for immediate cut of consumption tax to 5% and its eventual abolition, while sought to legalise the option of separate surnames for married couples and same-sex marriage, as well as correcting the gender pay gap, while the left-wing pacifist Reiwa Shinsengumi campaigned on abolishing the consumption tax, providing a stopgap cash payment of 100,000 yen, lowering social insurance premiums and not participating in the war business.

On 24 January, two new minor right-wing parties, Tax Cuts Japan and Yukoku Alliance and the New Unionist Party, were announced by former MPs Kazuhiro Haraguchi (also former Minister for Internal Affairs and Communications) and Takashi Kawamura, along with the independents. Five incumbent MPs have joined the party, qualifying it for national party status. The party also campaigned on abolishing the consumption tax and investing in developing hypersonic missiles. Sohei Kamiya, the leader of the far-right political party Sanseitō, said that the party plans to field candidates in LDP constituencies where the incumbent has "advocated multicultural coexistence". It campaigned on abolishing the consumption tax, while also opposing the "excessive acceptance of immigrants" by limiting their numbers.

== Debates ==
2026 Japanese general election debates
Date	Host	Format	Venue	P Present; I Invited; S Surrogate; NI Not invited; A Absent; N No debate										
Date	Host	Format	Venue	LDP	CRA	Ishin	DPP	Reiwa	JCP	Genyu	Sansei	CPJ	SDP	Mirai
26 January	Japan National Press Club	Debate	Japan National Press Club, Tokyo	P Takaichi	P Noda	P Fujita	P Tamaki	P Ōishi	P Tamura	NI; Haraguchi	P Kamiya	NI; Hyakuta	NI; Fukushima	NI; Anno
1 February	NHK (Nichiyō Tōron)	Debate	NHK Broadcasting Center, Tokyo	S Tamura	P Saito	P Yoshimura	P Tamaki	P Ōishi	P Tamura	P Haraguchi	P Kamiya	P Hyakuta	P Fukushima	P Anno

== Opinion polling ==
LOESS curve of the party identification polling for the 2026 Japanese general election with a 7-day average

=== Seat projections ===
Color key: Exit poll

Seat projections from analysts (district seats + proportional representation)
Fieldwork date	Publication/ Newspapers	Sample size	Analysts	LDP	CRA	Ishin	DPFP	Reiwa	JCP	Genyu	Sansei	CPJ	SDP	Mirai	Ind./ Oth.	Gov.	Opp.	Gov. Majority
8 Feb 2026	Election results	–	–	316 (249+67)	49 (7+42)	36 (20+16)	28 (8+20)	1 (0+1)	4 (0+4)	1 (1+0)	15 (0+15)	0	0	11 (0+11)	4 (4+0)	352	113	+119
8 Feb 2026	FNN exit poll	–	–	292–329	36–66	30–38	22–33	0–3	2–7	1–2	10–16	0–2	0–1	8–13	6	324–365	79–143	+91–132
8 Feb 2026	ANN exit poll	–	–	313	44	35	30	3	5	2	15	0	0	12	6	348	117	+115
8 Feb 2026	TV Tokyo exit poll	–	–	314	50	35	30	0	3	2	14	0	0	9	8	349	116	+116
8 Feb 2026	NNN exit poll	–	–	305	54	36	32	1	5	2	13	0	0	9	8	341	124	+108
8 Feb 2026	NHK exit poll	–	–	274–328	37–91	28–38	18–35	0–2	3–8	0–3	5–14	0–1	0	7–13	3–8	302–366	73–175	+69–133
8 Feb 2026	JNN exit poll	–	–	321	50	35	29	0	3	2	11	0	0	8	6	356	109	+123
3–5 Feb 2026	Mainichi/JNN	?	–	238–330	55–130	25–38	16–28	0–2	2–9	1–3	5–14	0–5	0	2–8	3–8	263–368	84–207	+30–135
3–5 Feb 2026	Nikkei	?	–	≥233														
3–5 Feb 2026	Yomiuri	356,593	–	>261	<100	~34	<27	<9	<8	1	~10	1	0	~10	~6	>295	<170	+62
31 Jan – 1 Feb 2026	Asahi	?	–	292 (220+72)	74 (32+42)	32 (19+13)	29 (9+20)	4 (0+4)	7 (1+6)	1 (1+0)	11 (0+11)	0 (0+0)	0 (0+0)	8 (0+8)	7 (7+0)	324	141	+91
28–29 Jan 2026	Mainichi/JNN	248,714	–	208–296	84–161	29–37	21–33	0	2–7	1–2	7–15	0	0	3–8	5–9	237–333	123–235	+4–100
28 Jan 2026	Shūkan Bunshun	–	Masashi Kubota	205 (Note: LDP-Independents: 2 (2+0)) (135+70)	167 (120+47)	29 (14+15)	27 (11+16)	6 (0+6)	6 (1+5)	2 (2+0)	15 (0+15)	1 (0+1)	0	1 (0+1)	6 (6+0)	234	231	+1
27–28 Jan 2026	Nikkei	?	–	≥233														
27–28 Jan 2026	Yomiuri	296,268	–	>261	~100	~34	~27	<9	<8	1–2	~10	1	0	~10	~6	>295	<170	+62
20 Jan 2026	Asahi TV News	–	Kijimae Yamamoto	232	124	33	35	7	5	0	19	3	0	1	6	265	200	+32
15 Dec 2025	Weekly Gendai	–	–	211 (Note: LDP-Independents: 1 (1+0)) (146+65)	163 (Note: CDP: 143 (103+40); Komeito: 20 (1+19)) (104+59)	33 (21+12)	30 (10+20)	7 (0+7)	7 (0+7)	1 (1+0)	6 (0+6)	0 (0+0)	0 (0+0)	–	7 (7+0)	244	221	+11
12 Nov 2025	Shūkan Bunshun	–	Masashi Kubota	241 (168+73)	122 (Note: CDP: 105 (82+23); Komeito: 17 (1+16)) (83+39)	32 (17+15)	26 (9+17)	6 (0+6)	6 (1+5)	–	19 (0+19)	1 (0+1)	0 (0+0)	1 (0+1)	11 (11+0)	273	192	+40
27 Oct 2024	2024 election results	–	–	191 (132+59)	172 (Note: CDP: 148 (104+44); Komeito: 24 (4+20)) (108+64)	38 (23+15)	28 (11+17)	9 (0+9)	8 (1+7)	–	3 (0+3)	3 (1+2)	1 (1+0)	–	12 (12+0)	237 (Note: LDP: 191; Ishin: 38; Independents: 8)	228	+4

== Turnout ==
Overall turnout was estimated at 55.68% in single-seat districts, higher than the last election's relatively low turnout of 53.85%. Early voting turnout in 2026 amounted to over 27 million voters or 26% of the electorate, a new all-time high for both national parliamentary (Representatives/Councillors) elections. This was attributed to the harsh winter weather during the election.

== Results ==
The LDP won a landslide victory, with the party winning an outright two-thirds supermajority and regaining its majority status in the chamber. The LDP's total of at least 316 seats is the most ever won by a party in Japanese post-war electoral history, surpassing the previous record of 308 seats won by the DPJ in the 2009 election and its own record of 300 seats in the 1986 election, as well as its previous record in terms of the share of seats from the 1960 election. The total LDP–JIP coalition, including 36 seats from JIP, now composed three-fourths of the House of Representatives. It was also the first time that the second-place party had fewer than 50 seats in Japan's postwar history.

The LDP actually won enough votes to get 330 seats; however, due to so few district candidates from the LDP losing, it did not have enough candidates to fill its seats in the proportional tier. The LDP therefore forfeited 14 seats to other parties, including 6 in the Southern Kantō block, 5 in the Tokyo block, 2 in the Hokuriku-Shin'etsu block, and 1 in the Chūgoku block. These 14 seats went to the CRA (6), DPP (2), Ishin (2), Team Mirai (2), Sanseitō (1), and Reiwa Shinsengumi (1). Meanwhile, Team Mirai forfeited two seats in the Kinki block, as its district candidates did not cross the 10% eligibility threshold to be elected from the proportional tier; these two seats went to the CRA and Ishin.

Party	Proportional			Constituency			Total seats	+/–
Party	Votes	%	Seats	Votes	%	Seats	Total seats	+/–
Liberal Democratic Party	21,026,139	36.72	67	27,710,493	49.09	249	316	+125
Centrist Reform Alliance	10,438,801	18.23	42	12,209,642	21.63	7	49	–123
Democratic Party For the People	5,572,951	9.73	20	4,243,282	7.52	8	28	0
Japan Innovation Party	4,943,330	8.63	16	3,742,161	6.63	20	36	–2
Sanseitō	4,260,620	7.44	15	3,924,223	6.95	0	15	+12
Team Mirai	3,813,749	6.66	11	156,853	0.28	0	11	New
Japanese Communist Party	2,519,807	4.40	4	2,283,885	4.05	0	4	–4
Reiwa Shinsengumi	1,672,499	2.92	1	255,496	0.45	0	1	–8
Conservative Party of Japan	1,455,563	2.54	0	97,753	0.17	0	0	–3
Tax Cuts Japan and Yukoku Alliance	814,874	1.42	0	354,617	0.63	1	1	New
Social Democratic Party	728,602	1.27	0	148,666	0.26	0	0	–1
Consideration the Euthanasia System	13,014	0.02	0				0	0
Independent Alliance				16,829	0.03	0	0	New
Nihon Yamato Party				15,213	0.03	0	0	New
Japan Liberal Party				12,885	0.02	0	0	New
The Path to Rebirth				12,492	0.02	0	0	New
First Star				2,686	0.00	0	0	New
World Peace Party				2,424	0.00	0	0	New
Future Progressive Party				2,068	0.00	0	0	New
Nuclear Fusion Party				916	0.00	0	0	New
Party of the Heart				795	0.00	0	0	0
Independents				1,253,346	2.22	4	4	–8
Total	57,259,949	100.00	176	56,446,725	100.00	289	465	0
Valid votes	57,259,949	98.62		54,446,726	97.12			
Invalid/blank votes	799,769	1.38		1,614,994	2.88			
Total votes	58,059,718	100.00		56,061,720	100.00			
Registered voters/turnout	103,211,223	56.25		103,211,224	54.32			
Source: Ministry of Internal Affairs and Communications

=== By constituency ===
Cartogram of single-member constituencies and proportional blocs

Prefecture	Total seats	Seats won					
Prefecture	Total seats	LDP	Ishin	DPP	CRA	Genyu	Ind.
Aichi	16	12		3		1	
Akita	3	2		1			
Aomori	3	3					
Chiba	14	13			1		
Ehime	3	3					
Fukui	2	2					
Fukuoka	11	10					1
Fukushima	4	4					
Gifu	5	5					
Gunma	5	5					
Hiroshima	6	6					
Hokkaido	12	11			1		
Hyōgo	12	11	1				
Ibaraki	7	5		1			1
Ishikawa	3	3					
Iwate	3	2			1		
Kagawa	3	1		1	1		
Kagoshima	4	3			1		
Kanagawa	20	20					
Kōchi	2	2					
Kumamoto	4	4					
Kyoto	6	4	1		1		
Mie	4	4					
Miyagi	5	5					
Miyazaki	3	1		1	1		
Nagano	5	5					
Nagasaki	3	2		1			
Nara	3	3					
Niigata	5	5					
Ōita	3	3					
Okayama	4	4					
Okinawa	4	4					
Osaka	19	1	18				
Saga	2	2					
Saitama	16	16					
Shiga	3	3					
Shimane	2	2					
Shizuoka	8	8					
Tochigi	5	4					1
Tokushima	2	2					
Tokyo	30	30					
Tottori	2	2					
Toyama	3	3					
Wakayama	2	1					1
Yamagata	3	3					
Yamaguchi	3	3					
Yamanashi	2	2					
Total	289	249	20	8	7	1	4

=== By PR block ===
PR block	Total seats	LDP		CRA		DPP		Ishin		Sansei		Mirai		JCP		Reiwa	
PR block	Total seats	Votes (%)	Seats	Votes (%)	Seats	Votes (%)	Seats	Votes (%)	Seats	Votes (%)	Seats	Votes (%)	Seats	Votes (%)	Seats	Votes (%)	Seats
Chūgoku	10	43.2	5	20.6	2	9.1	1	7.1	1	8.4	1	—	—	3.7	0	2.9	0
Hokkaido	8	37.0	4	24.6	3	8.9	1	3.8	0	6.6	0	5.5	0	5.4	0	3.1	0
Hokuriku–Shinetsu	10	42.1	3	19.8	4	9.8	1	7.0	1	8.7	1	—	—	4.3	0	3.0	0
Kinki	28	30.4	10	14.3	5	7.0	2	23.2	8	6.8	2	5.9	0	5.1	1	2.6	0
Kyushu	20	39.9	10	18.7	4	8.0	2	5.9	1	8.2	2	5.9	1	3.3	0	3.3	0
Northern Kanto	19	37.0	8	19.3	4	10.3	2	5.3	1	8.3	2	7.7	1	4.2	1	3.0	0
Shikoku	6	42.0	4	18.2	1	13.0	1	7.4	0	8.4	0	—	—	4.2	0	3.0	0
Southern Kanto	23	35.6	4	19.2	7	10.6	3	6.2	2	7.2	2	9.2	3	4.2	1	2.7	1
Tohoku	12	41.2	6	21.2	3	9.9	1	4.2	0	7.1	1	6.0	1	4.0	0	3.1	0
Tōkai	21	37.7	10	17.2	4	12.0	3	5.7	1	7.6	2	6.9	1	3.5	0	3.1	0
Tokyo	19	33.1	3	16.5	5	11.0	3	5.7	1	6.3	2	13.1	4	6.0	1	2.6	0
Total	176	36.7	67	18.2	42	9.7	20	8.6	16	7.4	15	6.7	11	4.4	4	2.9	1
Source: NHK

=== Party-list vote by prefecture ===
Prefecture	Party-list vote (%)							
Prefecture	LDP	CRA	DPP	Ishin	Sansei	Mirai	JCP	Reiwa
Aichi	36.0	16.3	12.2	6.3	7.4	7.4	3.6	2.9
Akita	44.3	17.1	14.8	5.5	5.3	4.4	3.4	2.4
Aomori	42.2	22.6	8.5	3.6	6.6	5.1	4.4	3.5
Chiba	37.0	20.3	10.2	5.2	7.4	8.4	4.0	2.6
Ehime	44.7	19.9	8.8	6.8	9.7	—	3.2	3.1
Fukui	45.7	15.6	10.0	7.6	11.9	—	2.3	2.4
Fukuoka	37.3	18.5	8.7	6.9	8.3	7.3	3.5	2.9
Fukushima	42.2	23.6	7.8	3.7	7.3	5.3	4.1	2.8
Gifu	40.9	17.3	9.9	5.4	8.2	6.2	3.3	3.6
Gunma	38.5	18.7	8.8	4.6	10.2	6.9	4.3	3.1
Hiroshima	40.1	21.0	10.3	8.3	8.2	—	3.5	3.0
Hokkaido	37.0	24.6	8.9	3.8	6.6	5.5	5.4	3.1
Hyōgo	33.9	16.1	7.1	17.8	7.0	6.4	4.2	2.7
Ibaraki	40.8	18.5	9.8	5.4	8.3	6.5	3.3	2.9
Ishikawa	44.7	15.3	10.9	8.7	9.6	—	3.0	2.9
Iwate	38.5	22.2	9.9	3.7	7.4	5.8	4.8	3.9
Kagawa	39.4	15.0	23.3	6.9	6.6	—	2.7	2.3
Kagoshima	44.6	19.3	6.2	5.0	8.3	6.0	2.6	2.8
Kanagawa	34.2	18.2	11.2	7.1	7.0	10.0	4.4	2.7
Kōchi	41.0	20.0	8.7	5.5	8.5	—	8.6	3.6
Kumamoto	43.0	17.0	6.6	6.2	9.8	5.8	2.8	3.2
Kyoto	32.3	15.2	7.5	14.9	6.5	6.8	9.1	2.8
Mie	38.8	21.5	8.2	5.7	8.1	5.9	3.2	3.1
Miyagi	39.1	21.9	8.3	4.8	8.1	7.8	4.0	2.8
Miyazaki	41.4	19.2	9.8	6.4	7.7	4.2	2.7	3.1
Nagano	36.6	22.9	9.8	6.7	8.1	—	6.6	3.7
Nagasaki	42.7	18.5	10.7	5.9	6.9	4.9	2.8	2.9
Nara	43.6	12.6	7.9	15.2	5.2	5.0	4.2	2.1
Niigata	43.5	22.6	8.5	5.8	7.6	—	3.7	2.9
Ōita	38.2	21.6	7.6	5.7	8.3	5.1	3.2	2.8
Okayama	44.5	20.1	8.6	6.7	8.2	—	4.0	2.7
Okinawa	35.3	19.6	6.8	4.2	7.8	5.0	6.3	6.4
Osaka	23.6	13.3	6.2	32.3	6.7	5.6	4.8	2.6
Saga	42.9	16.7	6.5	3.9	7.8	4.9	2.0	2.6
Saitama	34.2	19.8	11.0	5.5	7.7	8.7	4.8	2.9
Shiga	36.4	12.7	8.9	15.6	7.4	6.5	4.9	3.3
Shimane	45.4	22.5	7.8	5.2	7.7	—	4.2	2.9
Shizuoka	38.8	16.8	14.5	4.7	7.3	6.6	3.4	3.4
Tochigi	40.9	18.8	9.6	5.4	8.5	6.2	2.7	3.2
Tokushima	41.6	17.9	10.6	10.9	8.4	—	3.7	3.2
Tokyo	33.1	16.5	11.0	5.7	6.3	13.1	6.0	2.6
Tottori	39.6	28.0	8.1	5.2	7.7	—	4.0	2.8
Toyama	45.6	14.3	11.5	8.5	9.0	—	3.2	2.6
Wakayama	40.1	15.3	7.6	13.5	7.6	4.5	4.9	2.7
Yamagata	42.9	16.7	14.0	3.9	6.7	5.7	3.4	3.5
Yamaguchi	47.1	17.2	8.4	7.0	9.5	—	3.1	3.0
Yamanashi	40.7	22.2	7.9	4.2	7.5	5.9	3.9	3.3
Total votes	36.7	18.2	9.7	8.6	7.4	6.7	4.4	2.9
Source: NHK

== Aftermath ==
An election was held in both houses to elect the next prime minister.

=== House of Representatives ===
18 February 2026 221st Special National Diet Absolute majority (233/465) required
House of Representatives
Choice	Party	Votes
Sanae Takaichi	Liberal Democratic Party	354 / 465
Junya Ogawa	Centrist Reform Alliance	50 / 465
Yuichiro Tamaki	Democratic Party For the People	28 / 465
Sohei Kamiya	Sanseitō	15 / 465
Takahiro Anno	Team Mirai	11 / 465
Tomoko Tamura	Japanese Communist Party	4 / 465
Takashi Kawamura	Tax Cuts Japan and Yukoku Alliance	1 / 465
Fumiyo Okuda	Reiwa Shinsengumi	1 / 465

=== House of Councillors ===
18 February 2026 221st Special National Diet Absolute majority (125/248) required
House of Councillors
Choice	Party	Votes	
Choice	Party	First ballot	Runoff
Sanae Takaichi	Liberal Democratic Party	123 / 248	125 / 248
Junya Ogawa	Centrist Reform Alliance	58 / 248	65 / 248
Yuichiro Tamaki	Democratic Party For the People	25 / 248	Eliminated
Sohei Kamiya	Sanseitō	15 / 248	Eliminated
Tomoko Tamura	Japanese Communist Party	7 / 248	Eliminated
Fumiyo Okuda	Reiwa Shinsengumi	5 / 248	Eliminated
Shunichi Mizuoka	Constitutional Democratic Party of Japan	5 / 248	Eliminated
Yōichi Iha	Independent	2 / 248	Eliminated
Naoki Hyakuta	Conservative Party of Japan	2 / 248	Eliminated
Mizuho Fukushima	Social Democratic Party	2 / 248	Eliminated
Takahiro Anno	Team Mirai	1 / 248	Eliminated
Blank ballot		1 / 248	8 / 248
Invalid ballot			48 / 248

== See also ==
- 2026 Japanese local elections
- 2026 Nagasaki gubernatorial election – held on the same day
- 2026 Osaka gubernatorial election – held on the same day
- 2026 Osaka mayoral election – held on the same day
- 2026 Yamaguchi gubernatorial election – held on the same day
