= 2018 Niigata gubernatorial election =

- 10 June 2018
- Turnout: 58.25% ▲5.20%
| Candidate | Hideyo Hanazumi | Chikako Ikeda | Satoshi Annaka |
| Party | Independent | Independent | Independent |
| Popular vote | 546,670 | 509,568 | 45,628 |
| Percentage | 49.61% | 46.25% | 4.14% |
Governor before election
Ryuichi Yoneyama
Independent
Elected Governor
Hideyo Hanazumi
Independent

The 2018 Niigata gubernatorial election was held on 10 June 2018 to elect the next governor of Niigata. Incumbent Governor Ryuichi Yoneyama resigned on 18 April 2018 in the wake of a sex scandal. This was also the first gubernatorial election in Niigata since the voting age was lowered to 18.

The election was initially expected to be a de facto referendum on the anti-nuclear policies pursued by Gov. Yoneyama, particularly his opposition to the restart of the Kashiwazaki-Kariwa Nuclear Power Plant in Central Niigata. Both the pro-nuclear and the anti-nuclear camps are coalescing towards one candidate to represent each camp. The pro-nuclear camp will be represented by Hideyo Hanazumi, who is endorsed by the governing LDP and Komeito. Anti-nuclear Chikako Ikeda will be the opposition's unity candidate in the election.

In contrary to the policy of the parties that endorsed him, Hanazumi followed the opposition's line on nuclear energy, not unlike the one held by the incumbent governor. Hanazumi won the gubernatorial election by a narrow 3.4% margin. He vowed to continue Governor Yoneyama's approach on the issue of the Kashiwazaki-Kariwa power plant restart and related safety evaluations. In his victory speech, he also mentioned the possibility of resigning and holding another election mid-term to ask the populace whether the reactor should be restarted or not.

== Candidates ==
=== Running ===
- Hideyo Hanazumi, former Deputy Governor of Niigata (2013–2015). (endorsed by LDP and Komeito)
- Chikako Ikeda, member of the Niigata Prefectural Assembly (2015–present). (endorsed by CDP, DPFP, JCP, SDP and LP)
- Satoshi Annaka, former member of the Gosen municipal assembly and independent candidate for the Niigata at-large district in the 2010 House of Councillors election.

=== Declined ===
- Makiko Kikuta, member of the House of Representatives (2003–present).
- Shigeaki Koga, former Ministry of Economy, Trade and Industry bureaucrat and prominent Abe administration critic.
- Etsuko Odaira, former mayor of Uonuma (2008–2016) and candidate for the Niigata 5th district in the 2017 general election.
- Isato Kunisada, mayor of Sanjō and former Ministry of Internal Affairs and Communications bureaucrat.

== Results ==
Niigata gubernatorial election, 2018
| Party | Candidate | Votes | % | ±% |
|---|---|---|---|---|
| Independent | Hideyo Hanazumi | 546,670 | 49.61 | |
| Independent | Chikako Ikeda | 509,568 | 46.25 | |
| Independent | Satoshi Annaka | 45,628 | 4.14 | |
| Total valid votes | | 1,101,866 | 99.08 | |
| Rejected ballots | | 10,261 | 0.92 | |
| Turnout | | 1,112,127 | 58.25 | ▲5.20 |
| Registered electors | | 1,909,379 | | |

=== Breakdown ===
| Division | Subdivision | | | | | | | | | | | | |
| Division | Subdivision | Annaka Independent | | Hanazumi Independent | | Ikeda Independent | | Valid votes | | Invalid votes | | Turnout | |
| Division | Subdivision | Votes | % | Votes | % | Votes | % | Votes | % | Votes | % | Total | % |
|---|---|---|---|---|---|---|---|---|---|---|---|---|---|
| Cities | Niigata | 14,090 | 3.98 | 178,726 | 50.49 | 161,179 | 45.53 | 353,995 | 99.16 | 2,989 | 0.84 | 356,985 | 53.73 |
| Cities | Kita-ku | 1,239 | 3.83 | 16,514 | 51.05 | 14,595 | 45.12 | 32,348 | 99.25 | 245 | 0.75 | 32,593 | 52.08 |
| Cities | Higashi-ku | 2,726 | 4.63 | 29,693 | 50.46 | 26,430 | 44.91 | 58,849 | 99.15 | 502 | 0.85 | 59,351 | 51.59 |
| Cities | Chūō-ku | 2,673 | 3.33 | 43,802 | 54.58 | 33,785 | 42.09 | 80,260 | 99.12 | 712 | 0.88 | 80,972 | 55.28 |
| Cities | Kōnan-ku | 1,331 | 4.41 | 15,423 | 51.09 | 13,436 | 44.50 | 30,190 | 99.20 | 244 | 0.80 | 30,434 | 53.16 |
| Cities | Akiha-ku | 1,457 | 4.12 | 16,074 | 45.48 | 17,813 | 50.40 | 35,344 | 99.23 | 273 | 0.77 | 30,434 | 54.98 |
| Cities | Minami-ku | 781 | 4.16 | 9,276 | 49.39 | 8,723 | 46.45 | 18,780 | 99.22 | 148 | 0.78 | 18,928 | 49.49 |
| Cities | Nishi-ku | 2,846 | 4.00 | 35,950 | 50.48 | 32,418 | 45.52 | 71,214 | 99.11 | 641 | 0.89 | 71,855 | 54.99 |
| Cities | Nishikan-ku | 1,037 | 3.84 | 11,994 | 44.41 | 13,979 | 51.75 | 27,010 | 99.17 | 225 | 0.83 | 27,235 | 55.20 |
| Cities | Nagaoka | 4,658 | 3.57 | 61,348 | 47.04 | 64,406 | 49.39 | 130,412 | 98.98 | 1,339 | 1.02 | 131,751 | 58.12 |
| Cities | Sanjō | 2,402 | 4.94 | 23,132 | 47.54 | 23,120 | 47.52 | 48,654 | 99.14 | 423 | 0.86 | 49,077 | 58.88 |
| Cities | Kashiwazaki | 971 | 2.07 | 21,985 | 46.95 | 23,871 | 50.98 | 46,827 | 99.21 | 374 | 0.79 | 47,201 | 65.77 |
| Cities | Shibata | 1,963 | 4.23 | 23,901 | 51.49 | 20,552 | 44.28 | 46,416 | 99.08 | 429 | 0.92 | 46,845 | 56.64 |
| Cities | Ojiya | 691 | 3.52 | 9,071 | 46.18 | 9,880 | 50.30 | 19,642 | 98.73 | 252 | 1.27 | 19,894 | 65.28 |
| Cities | Kamo | 591 | 4.14 | 6,922 | 48.50 | 6,760 | 47.36 | 14,273 | 99.08 | 133 | 0.92 | 14,406 | 60.41 |
| Cities | Tōkamachi | 975 | 3.25 | 14,733 | 49.14 | 14,274 | 47.61 | 29,982 | 99.06 | 286 | 0.94 | 30,268 | 65.83 |
| Cities | Mitsuke | 973 | 4.76 | 8,850 | 43.34 | 10,598 | 51.90 | 20,421 | 98.81 | 245 | 1.19 | 20,666 | 60.08 |
| Cities | Murakami | 1,068 | 3.32 | 17,196 | 53.41 | 13,932 | 43.27 | 32,196 | 99.23 | 251 | 0.77 | 32,447 | 61.76 |
| Cities | Tsubame | 1,543 | 3.93 | 18,937 | 48.25 | 18,766 | 47.82 | 39,246 | 99.10 | 358 | 0.90 | 39,604 | 58.74 |
| Cities | Itoigawa | 788 | 3.23 | 12,958 | 53.15 | 10,634 | 43.62 | 24,380 | 99.21 | 195 | 0.79 | 24,575 | 66.12 |
| Cities | Myōkō | 757 | 4.73 | 7,611 | 47.54 | 7,643 | 47.74 | 16,011 | 99.32 | 110 | 0.68 | 20,666 | 57.78 |
| Cities | Gosen | 4,049 | 16.01 | 11,683 | 46.19 | 9,564 | 37.81 | 25,296 | 99.35 | 165 | 0.65 | 25,461 | 58.46 |
| Cities | Jōetsu | 3,880 | 4.24 | 41,398 | 45.19 | 46,338 | 50.58 | 91,616 | 99.00 | 922 | 1.00 | 92,538 | 57.24 |
| Cities | Agano | 1,068 | 4.81 | 11,971 | 53.95 | 9,149 | 41.23 | 22,188 | 99.18 | 184 | 0.82 | 22,372 | 61.40 |
| Cities | Sado | 711 | 2.27 | 21,344 | 68.06 | 9,305 | 29.67 | 31,360 | 99.32 | 215 | 0.68 | 31,575 | 65.46 |
| Cities | Uonuma | 916 | 4.47 | 9,905 | 48.38 | 9,652 | 47.15 | 20,473 | 98.53 | 305 | 1.47 | 20,778 | 66.48 |
| Cities | Minamiuonuma | 1,205 | 4.03 | 14,122 | 47.27 | 14,550 | 48.70 | 29,877 | 98.18 | 553 | 1.82 | 30,430 | 64.31 |
| Cities | Tainai | 570 | 3.73 | 8,210 | 53.74 | 6,496 | 42.52 | 15,276 | 99.19 | 125 | 0.81 | 15,401 | 61.12 |
| Towns and villages | Kitakanbara District | 322 | 5.13 | 3,566 | 56.77 | 2,394 | 38.11 | 6,282 | 99.18 | 52 | 0.82 | 6,334 | 55.59 |
| Towns and villages | Seirō | 322 | 5.13 | 3,566 | 56.77 | 2,394 | 38.11 | 6,282 | 99.18 | 52 | 0.82 | 6,334 | 55.59 |
| Towns and villages | Nishikanbara District | 186 | 4.13 | 2,136 | 47.47 | 2,178 | 48.40 | 4,500 | 99.97 | 47 | 1.03 | 4,547 | 66.39 |
| Towns and villages | Yahiko | 186 | 4.13 | 2,136 | 47.47 | 2,178 | 48.40 | 4,500 | 99.97 | 47 | 1.03 | 4,547 | 66.39 |
| Towns and villages | Minamikanbara District | 353 | 5.30 | 3,154 | 47.36 | 3,153 | 47.34 | 6,660 | 99.06 | 63 | 0.94 | 6,723 | 65.16 |
| Towns and villages | Tagami | 353 | 5.30 | 3,154 | 47.36 | 3,153 | 47.34 | 6,660 | 99.06 | 63 | 0.94 | 6,723 | 65.16 |
| Towns and villages | Higashikanbara District | 320 | 4.51 | 3,837 | 54.13 | 2,931 | 41.35 | 7,088 | 98.95 | 75 | 1.05 | 7,163 | 70.93 |
| Towns and villages | Aga | 320 | 4.51 | 3,837 | 54.13 | 2,931 | 41.35 | 7,088 | 98.95 | 75 | 1.05 | 7,163 | 70.93 |
| Towns and villages | Santō District | 68 | 2.56 | 1,415 | 53.34 | 1,170 | 44.10 | 2,653 | 99.03 | 26 | 0.97 | 2,679 | 68.39 |
| Towns and villages | Izumozaki | 68 | 2.56 | 1,415 | 53.34 | 1,170 | 44.10 | 2,653 | 99.03 | 26 | 0.97 | 2,679 | 68.39 |
| Towns and villages | Minamiuonuma District | 164 | 4.17 | 1,836 | 46.68 | 1,933 | 49.15 | 3,933 | 98.92 | 43 | 1.08 | 3,976 | 57.56 |
| Towns and villages | Yuzawa | 164 | 4.17 | 1,836 | 46.68 | 1,933 | 49.15 | 3,933 | 98.92 | 43 | 1.08 | 3,976 | 57.56 |
| Towns and villages | Nakauonuma District | 183 | 3.11 | 3,029 | 51.48 | 2,672 | 45.41 | 5,884 | 99.21 | 47 | 0.79 | 5,931 | 70.39 |
| Towns and villages | Tsunan | 183 | 3.11 | 3,029 | 51.48 | 2,672 | 45.41 | 5,884 | 99.21 | 47 | 0.79 | 5,931 | 70.39 |
| Towns and villages | Kariwa District | 60 | 2.17 | 1,566 | 56.53 | 1,144 | 41.30 | 2,770 | 99.14 | 24 | 0.86 | 2,794 | 71.79 |
| Towns and villages | Kariwa | 60 | 2.17 | 1,566 | 56.53 | 1,144 | 41.30 | 2,770 | 99.14 | 24 | 0.86 | 2,794 | 71.79 |
| Towns and villages | Iwafune District | 103 | 2.90 | 2,128 | 59.86 | 1,324 | 37.24 | 3,555 | 99.16 | 30 | 0.84 | 3,585 | 67.97 |
| Towns and villages | Sekikawa | 99 | 3.01 | 1,941 | 59.00 | 1,250 | 37.99 | 3,290 | 99.13 | 29 | 0.87 | 3,319 | 66.49 |
| Towns and villages | Awashimaura | 4 | 1.51 | 187 | 70.57 | 74 | 27.92 | 265 | 99.62 | 1 | 0.38 | 266 | 94.33 |
| Total | | 45,628 | 4.14 | 546,670 | 49.61 | 509,568 | 46.25 | 1,101,866 | 99.08 | 10,246 | 0.92 | 1,112,127 | 58.25 |
Source: Results
