= Tatsuji Sugimoto =

Japanese politician (born 1962)

- 杉本 達治

Governor of Fukui Prefecture
- In office 23 April 2019 – 4 December 2025
- Monarchs: Akihito; Naruhito
- Preceded by: Issei Nishikawa
- Succeeded by: Takato Ishida

Personal details
- Born: 31 July 1962 (age 64) Nakatsugawa, Gifu, Japan
- Party: Independent
- Education: University of Tokyo

Tatsuji Sugimoto (杉本 達治, Sugimoto Tatsuji; born 31 July 1962) is a Japanese politician and former Governor of Fukui Prefecture from 2019 to 2025. He is from Gifu Prefecture.

== Biography ==
Sugimoto graduated from the University of Tokyo. He worked for Ministry of Home Affairs. He served as governor of Fukui Prefecture from 2019 until his resignation on 4 December 2025 following allegations of sexual harassment of government employees.

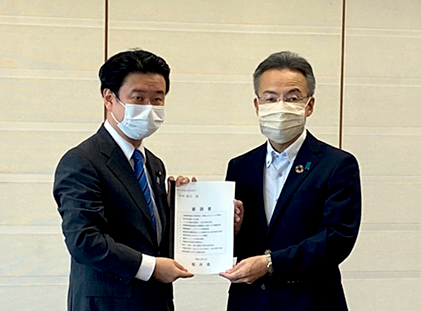
Sugimoto with Masamune Wada (in Fukui Prefecture on 2 September 2020)
