= Takato Ishida =

Japanese politician (born 1990)

- 石田 嵩人
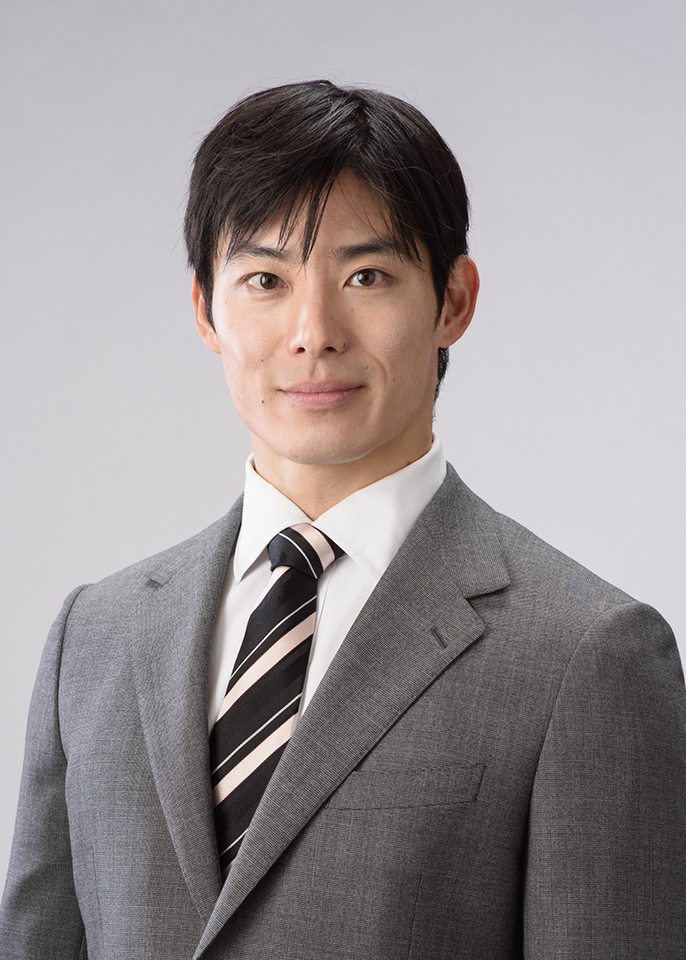
- Official portrait, 2026

Governor of Fukui Prefecture
- Incumbent
- Assumed office 28 January 2026
- Monarch: Naruhito
- Preceded by: Tatsuji Sugimoto

Personal details
- Born: 5 February 1990 (age 36) Fukui, Fukui Prefecture, Japan
- Party: Independent (since 2025)
- Other political affiliations: DPFP (until 2025)
- Education: Kansai Gaidai University (BA); Pacific University (BA); Georgetown University (MS); National Graduate Institute for Policy Studies (PhD)

Takato Ishida (Japanese: 石田 嵩人, Hepburn: Ishida Takato; born 5 February 1990) is a Japanese politician who has been the governor of Fukui Prefecture since 2026. He was previously a diplomat under the Ministry of Foreign Affairs in Zambia and Australia. He resigned his ministry post to run for governor after his predecessor’s resignation and won the January 2026 election, campaigning on child‑rearing support, crisis management and greater use of social media to engage voters.

== Early life and education ==
Ishida was born on 5 February 1990 in Fukui, Fukui Prefecture, Japan. His father was a surgeon, and Ishida lived in London, England, because of his father's work while he was in the sixth grade. Ishida later recalled that news coverage in Britain of the September 11 attacks in 2001 led him to become interested in international relations.

In 2012, Ishida graduated from Kansai Gaidai University and Pacific University with dual bachelor's degrees in communications and international relations, respectively. As an undergraduate, he entered a study abroad program intended to prepare students for careers in international organizations such as the United Nations, which allowed him to study in the U.S. in Oregon. He then obtained a Master of Science in Foreign Service from Georgetown University in 2018 and began studying for a doctorate in security studies from the National Graduate Institute for Policy Studies in 2022. He earned his Ph.D. in 2025 in international relations. His doctoral dissertation was titled, The Rise and Fall of Paradiplomacy in Australia: Victoria's Engagement with China and the Federal Government's Response.

While studying abroad, the 2011 Tōhoku earthquake and tsunami prompted him to return to Japan. During a subsequent stay in Boston, Massachusetts, he met a Ministry of Foreign Affairs diplomat who told him he would be well suited to the ministry, prompting him to seek a diplomatic career.

== Political career ==
=== Ministry of Foreign Affairs ===
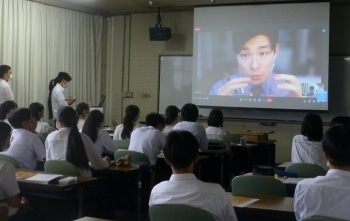
Ishida on a video call lecturing students at Toyama Prefectural Toyama Minami High School in 2021.

Ishida passed the Ministry of Foreign Affairs recruitment examination on his third attempt and joined the ministry in 2015. In 2018, he was posted to the Embassy of Japan in the Republic of Zambia as Third Secretary. While there, he served as an interpreter for a visiting Japanese parliamentary vice minister for foreign affairs during meetings with President Edgar Lungu and for a prime ministerial envoy on an official trip to Nigeria. From 2020 to 2022, he served as Vice Consul at the Consulate-General of Japan in Melbourne, Australia. During his time at the Foreign Ministry, he also worked on issues including energy security.

=== Governor of Fukui Prefecture ===
Results of the 2026 Fukui gubernatorial election, in which Ishida (in orange) won 47.97% of the vote.

On 25 December 2025, Ishida held a press conference to announce his resignation from ministerial office in order to run as a candidate for the Governorship of Fukui Prefecture. The incumbent governor, Tatsuji Sugimoto, had resigned on 5 December amid allegations of sexual harassment of government employees. While the Liberal Democratic Party's members of the Fukui Prefectural Assembly endorsed former Echizen mayor Ken'ichi Yamada, a faction of LDP‑aligned Fukui City Council members who had initially supported Sugimoto instead backed Ishida. Formerly a member of the Democratic Party For the People, Ishida had become an independent and an LDP associate shortly before his announcement.

During the campaign, Ishida used social media to gain support and pledged to expand child‑rearing assistance and strengthen crisis management. Near the campaign's end, Sanseitō prefectural head Sohei Kamiya announced his backing of Ishida. In the 25 January 2026 election, Ishida defeated Kenichi Yamada and Yukie Kanemoto, the latter an official of the Japanese Communist Party's prefectural branch, becoming Japan's youngest governor.

After assuming office on 28 January 2026, a greeting video he posted to Instagram went viral, drawing attention and admiration for his appearance and youth, with a subsequent post in March also attracting praise. In March 2026, Ishida apologized for a campaign remark describing Japan as "ethnically homogeneous", saying his experience abroad had led him to recognize that Japan is relatively compact in ethnicity, culture, and language.

== Electoral history ==
2026 Fukui gubernatorial election
Party	Candidate	Votes	%
Independent (-)	Takato Ishida	134,620	47.97
Independent	Ken'ichi Yamada	130,290	46.43
JCP	Kanemoto Yukie	15,735	5.61
Registered electors		610,925	
Total votes		280,645	100.00
