= Toyohito Ikeda =

Japanese politician

- 池田豊人
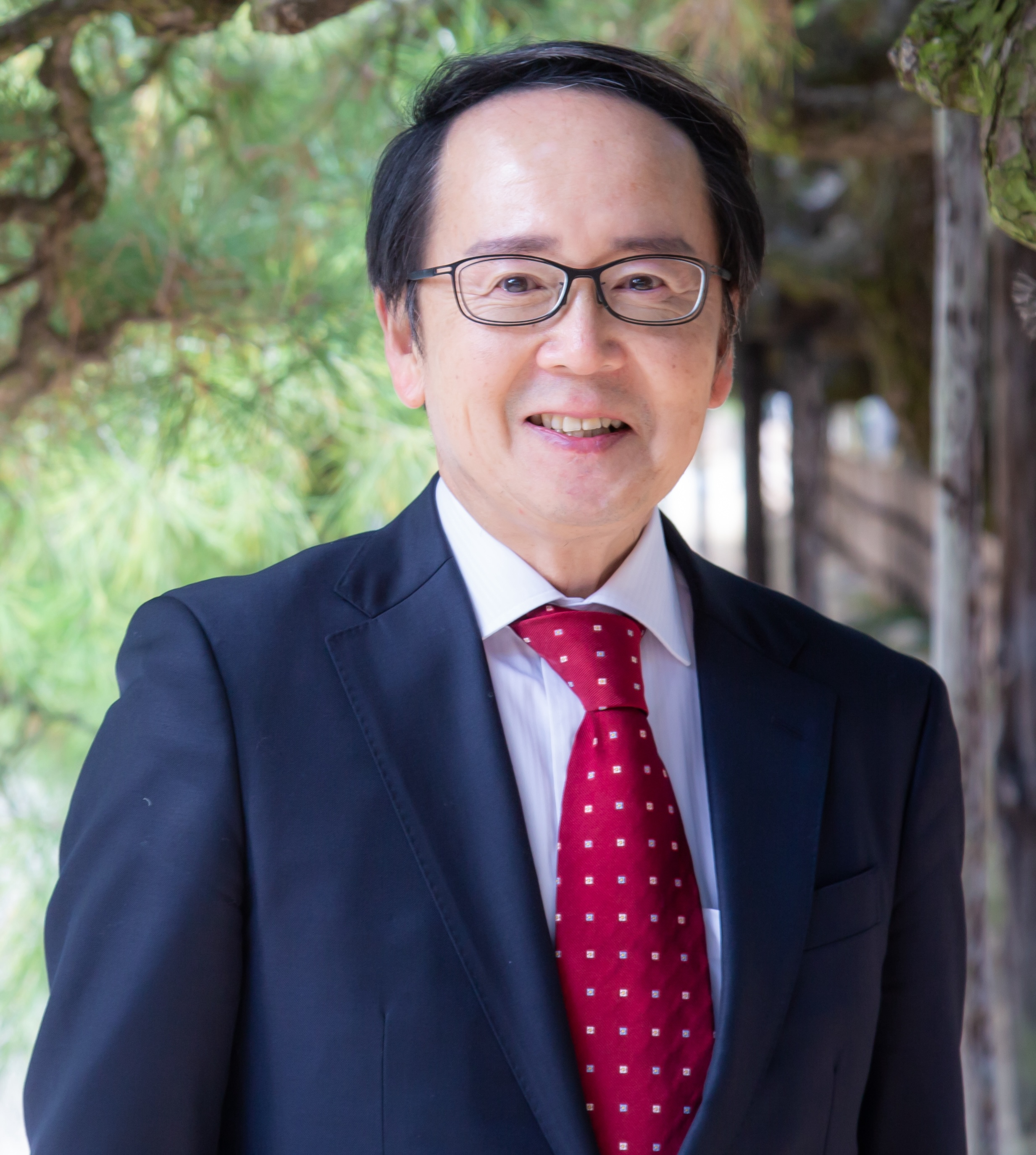

Governor of Kagawa Prefecture
- Incumbent
- Assumed office 5 September 2022
- Monarch: Naruhito
- Preceded by: Keizō Hamada

Personal details
- Born: 15 July 1961 (age 65) Takamatsu, Kagawa, Japan
- Party: Independent
- Education: University of Tokyo

Toyohito Ikeda (池田豊人, Ikeda Toyohito; born 15 July 1961) is a Japanese politician. He currently serves as governor of Kagawa Prefecture since 2022.
