= 2025 in Japan =

- Decades: 2000s; 2010s; 2020s; 2030s
- See also: Other events of 2025; History of Japan • Timeline • Years

Events in the year 2025 in Japan.

== Incumbents ==
- Emperor: Naruhito
- Prime Minister
  - Shigeru Ishiba (Liberal Democratic) (until 21 October)
  - Sanae Takaichi (Liberal Democratic) (starting 21 October)
- Chief Cabinet Secretary: Minoru Kihara (Liberal Democratic)
- Chief Justice of Japan: Yukihiko Imasaki
- Speaker of the House of Representatives: Fukushiro Nukaga (Liberal Democratic)
- President of the House of Councillors: Masakazu Sekiguchi (Liberal Democratic)

== Arts and entertainment ==
- 2025 in anime
- 2025 in Japanese music
- 2025 in Japanese television
- List of 2025 box office number-one films in Japan
- List of Japanese films of 2025
- 38th Tokyo International Film Festival

== Events ==
=== January ===
- January 3 – U.S. President Joe Biden blocks the proposed acquisition of U.S. Steel by Nippon Steel.
- January 10 – Eight students are injured in a hammer attack inside the Tama campus of Hosei University in Machida, Tokyo. A 22-year old South Korean national is arrested.
- January 13 – A magnitude 6.6 earthquake hits Miyazaki Prefecture, injuring three people.
- January 22 – One person is killed while two others are injured in a knife attack outside Nagano Station.
- January 26 –
  - The 2025 Yamagata gubernatorial election was held. It was won by the incumbent Mieko Yoshimura.
  - The 2025 Gifu gubernatorial election was held. It was won by the newcomer Yoshihide Esaki.
- January 27 – Koichi Minato and Shuji Kanoh resign as the respective president and chair of Fuji Television amid criticism over the network's handling of a sexual abuse scandal involving television personality Masahiro Nakai.
- January 28 – A sinkhole appears in a road intersection in Yashio, Saitama, swallowing up a truck being driven by an elderly man whose body is recovered on May 2.
- January 29 – Japan suspends funding for the United Nations Committee on the Elimination of Discrimination against Women in response to its publication of a report in 2024 calling for the revision of Japanese imperial succession law to allow women to become empresses regnant.

=== February ===
- February 3 – Former MP Tamotsu Shiiki is sentenced to a five-year suspended prison sentence for raping an underage girl at a karaoke parlor in Tokyo in August 2024.
- February 17 – The Taliban conducts a diplomatic visit to Japan for the first time since taking power in Afghanistan in 2021.
- February 19 – Ryūji Kimura is convicted and sentenced to ten years' imprisonment for the attempted assassination of Fumio Kishida in 2023.
- February 21 – The Cabinet approves a bill to allow bears spotted in urban areas to be shot at hunters' discretion following an increase in encounters and attacks on humans.
- February 26 – The Ōfunato wildfire starts in Iwate Prefecture. The Fire and Disaster Management Agency estimates over 80 homes have been destroyed.
- February 27 – The body of a man is found by police on a road within the Ōfunato wildfire evacuation zone.
- February 28 – The Ōfunato wildfire grows to cover over 1,200 ha (3,000 acres), making it the largest wildfire on record in Japan.

=== March ===
- March 3 – Prime Minister Ishiba gives 100,000-yen gift vouchers to 15 LDP lawmakers, sparking criticism. Ishiba denies breaking political laws.
- March 4 –
  - The Ōfunato wildfire reaches 2,600 ha (6,400 acres) with over 2,000 firefighters from 14 prefectures fighting the blaze.
  - Yuji Iwasawa is elected as President of the International Court of Justice.
- March 6 – The Tōhoku Shinkansen suffers a decoupling incident involving the Hayabusa and Komachi trains, causing a week-long suspension of services along the Akita and Yamagata Shinkansen lines.
- March 7 – The Nagoya High Court rules that the non-recognition of same-sex marriage in Japan is unconstitutional and discriminatory.
- March 12 – Police arrest several men in Aichi for alleged sexual assault and child pornography.
- March 14 –
  - NHK Party leader Takashi Tachibana is injured in a stabbing while giving a speech in front of the Ministry of Economy, Trade and Industry in Tokyo. The attacker, who confesses an intention to kill Tachibana, is arrested at the scene.
  - Police arrest Kenji Takano for fatally stabbing YouTuber Airi Sato during a livestream in Tokyo.
- March 16 – The 2025 Chiba gubernatorial election was held. It was won by the incumbent Toshihito Kumagai.
- March 17 –
  - A Japanese resident of Belarus is convicted and sentenced by a court in Minsk to seven years' imprisonment for spying for Japanese intelligence.
  - The dismantling of the Number 2 Reactor at Hamaoka Nuclear Power Plant in Shizuoka Prefecture begins in what is the first operation of its kind in Japan.
- March 23 –
  - Wildfires break out in Okayama and Ehime Prefectures, prompting the evacuation of 3,000 people.
  - The 2025 Fukuoka gubernatorial election was held. It was won by the incumbent Seitaro Hattori.
- March 25 –
  - The Tokyo District Court revokes the legal status of the Unification Church as a religious organization in Japan and orders the group to liquidate its assets.
  - The Osaka High Court rules that the non-recognition of same-sex marriage in Japan is unconstitutional and discriminatory.
- March 26 – Professor Masaki Kashiwara of the Institute for Advanced Study of Kyoto University becomes the first person from Japan to be awarded the Abel Prize for his contributions in the field of algebraic analysis.
- March 27 – Former MP Megumi Hirose is sentenced to a suspended 2.5 year prison term for defrauding 3.5 million yen ($23,000) in public funds by claiming salary expenses for a secretary who did no work.
- March 31 – Gyudon chain Sukiya imposes a one-week nationwide closure of its stores for cleanup after revelations of pest contamination in its food items.

=== April ===
- April 5 – Two tour buses collide along the Chūō Expressway in Hachiōji, Tokyo, injuring 47 people.
- April 6 –
  - A medevac helicopter crashes off the coast of Nagasaki Prefecture, killing three of the six people on board.
  - The 2025 Akita gubernatorial election was held. It was won by the newcomer Kenta Suzuki.
- April 7 –
  - Emperor Naruhito and Empress Masako visit Iwo Jima to commemorate the 80th anniversary of the Battle of Iwo Jima, in the first visit to the island by a Japanese monarch since 1994.
  - Shinji Aoyama resigns as executive vice president of Honda following "an allegation of inappropriate conduct".
- April 8 – Actress Ryōko Hirosue is arrested on suspicion of assaulting and injuring a nurse at a hospital in Shimada after being transported there following a vehicular crash on the Shin-Tōmei Expressway in Kakegawa the previous night.
- April 13 – October 13 – Expo 2025 in Osaka.
- April 15 –
  - Governor of Wakayama Prefecture Shūhei Kishimoto dies of septic shock at a hospital in Wakayama after being found unconscious at the governor's residence on the day prior. He is the first prefectural governor to die in office after Takeshi Onaga, then-governor of Okinawa Prefecture, who died in 2018.
  - The Japan Fair Trade Commission issues a cease-and-desist order against Google for forcing manufacturers to preinstall its apps on Android smartphones in violation of domestic anti-monopoly laws.
- April 18 – A magnitude 5.2 earthquake hits Nagano Prefecture, injuring one person.
- April 26 – A collision involving 11 vehicles along the Tohoku Expressway in Nasushiobara, Tochigi Prefecture, leaves three people dead and 10 others injured.

=== May ===
- May 1 –
  - Seven children are injured in a car-ramming attack in Osaka. The driver is arrested.
  - The Imperial Household Agency announces the dismissal of one of its employees for stealing 3.6 million yen while working as a palace attendant from 2023 to 2025.
- May 7 – Two people are injured in a knife attack at Tōdaimae Station in Tokyo. The assailant is arrested.
- May 8 – Five teachers are injured in an assault by two men inside an elementary school in Tachikawa, Tokyo.
- May 14 – A Kawasaki T-4 trainer aircraft of the Japan Air Self-Defense Force crashes into Lake Iruka in Inuyama, Aichi, killing its two crew.
- May 21 – Agriculture minister Taku Etō resigns amid criticism over saying that he "never had to buy rice" and receives it from supporters instead amid high prices for the staple.
- May 23 – Forty-two people are injured in a pepper spray attack at a mall in Chiba Prefecture. A suspect is arrested.
- May 27 – Ten people are injured in a series of suspected gas explosions at a construction site in Edogawa, Tokyo.
- May 30 – The Imperial Household Agency announced that the former princess Mako Komuro gave birth to their first child.
- May 31 – Kushiro Mayor Hidenori Tsuruma issued a "No More Megasolar" declaration in the city following the issue of mega solar farms outside the Kushiro-shitsugen National Park.

=== June ===
- June 1 – Following the death of Shūhei Kishimoto on April 15, the Wakayama gubernatorial special election was held. It was won by incumbent acting governor Izumi Miyazaki.
- June 6 –
  - The Tokyo-based private spaceflight company ispace Inc. announces the failure of its Resilience lunar lander after losing contact during a mission to the Moon.
  - Ichiyo Shimizu is elected as the first woman president of the Japan Shogi Association.
- June 9 – Four JSDF soldiers are injured in an explosion at a storage facility for unexploded ordnance at Kadena Air Base in Okinawa Prefecture.
- June 10 – Japan qualifies for the 2026 FIFA World Cup after defeating Indonesia 6-0 at the 2026 FIFA World Cup qualification in Suita.
- June 21 – An earthquake swarm breaks out in the Tokara Islands in Kagoshima Prefecture, with over 900 tremors, the strongest measuring a magnitude of 5.5, recorded by July 2.
- June 22 –
  - The Shinmoedake volcano in Kyushu erupts for the first time since 2018, prompting the Japan Meteorological Agency to raise a level 2 warning.
  - 2025 Tokyo prefectural election
- June 24 – A US Marine is convicted and sentenced to seven years' imprisonment by the Naha District Court for sexually assaulting a woman in Yomitan, Okinawa Prefecture in 2024.
- June 26 – Seiko Hashimoto becomes the first woman to be elected president of the Japanese Olympic Committee.
- June 27 – Serial killer Takahiro Shiraishi, who was dubbed the "Twitter killer" for luring and murdering people in Zama, Kanagawa in 2017, becomes the first person to be executed by the Japanese state since 2022.
- June 30 –
  - China lifts a ban on seafood imports from Japan that it imposed in 2023 in response to the dumping of radioactive wastewater from the Fukushima Daiichi Nuclear Power Plant into the Pacific Ocean.
  - Nagoya Mayor Ichirō Hirosawa collapsed during a press conference and was rushed to the hospital.

=== July ===
- July 3 – Akira Otani becomes the first person from Japan to win in the UK-based Dagger Awards for her novel "The Night of Baba Yaga", which wins the best translated crime novel category.
- July 6 – Two people are killed in a knife attack at a bar in Hamamatsu. A suspect is arrested.
- July 7 – The Institute for International Business Communication nullifies the results of 803 applicants who took the Test of English for International Communication exam in Japan from 2023 to 2025 due to cheating.
- July 12 –
  - Hokkaido Prefecture issues its highest-level alert warning for brown bears for the first time following the death of a man in Fukushima from a suspected bear attack.
  - Taiwanese company TiSPACE fails to complete Japan’s first foreign rocket launch after its VP01 rocket falls shortly after liftoff from Hokkaido Spaceport.
- July 15 –
  - Typhoon Nari becomes the first tropical cyclone to make landfall over Hokkaido since 2016.
  - A building under demolition collapses in Kurume, killing two workers.
  - Japan wins the 2025 EAFF E-1 Football Championship after defeating South Korea 1-0 at the final in Yongin.
- July 20 – 2025 Japanese House of Councillors election: The ruling LDP–Komeito coalition loses its majority in the House of Councillors.
- July 22 –
  - Japanese Prime Minister Shigeru Ishiba intended to announced his resignation from office by the end of August.
  - US President Donald Trump announces a trade agreement with Japan reducing tariffs on Japanese exports from 25% to 15%.
- July 28 – Six people are injured in a mass stabbing in Mito, Ibaraki. A suspect is arrested.
- July 30 –
  - A magnitude 8.8 earthquake with an epicenter off the coast of Kamchatka in neighboring Russia triggers tsunamis that affect Japan and results in one indirect death from a car accident in Kumano, Mie.
  - The Tokyo District Court orders TEPCO to pay 100 million yen ($676,000) in damages to Katsutaka Idogawa, the former mayor of Futaba, Fukushima, over the impact of the Fukushima nuclear accident in 2011.
  - The Japan Meteorological Agency records the highest temperature recorded in Japan, at 41.2 °C (106.2 °F) in Tamba, Hyōgo Prefecture.

=== August ===
- August 2 – Four drainage workers are killed after falling into a manhole in Gyōda, Saitama Prefecture.
- August 3 – 2025 Yokohama mayoral election was held.
- August 5 –
  - The Japan Meteorological Agency records the highest temperature recorded in Japan, at 41.8 °C (107.2 °F) in Isesaki, Gunma Prefecture, exceeding the previous record set on July 30.
  - The first osmotic power plant in Japan opens in Fukuoka Prefecture.
  - 102-year old Kokichi Akuzawa becomes the oldest person to reach the summit of Mount Fuji.
- August 7 –
  - A Mitsubishi F-2 fighter jet of the JASDF crashes off the coast of Ibaraki Prefecture during a training flight. The pilot safely ejects and is rescued.
  - Newspaper company Yomiuri Shimbun sues the US-based AI firm Perplexity for its alleged "free riding" of 120,000 articles from February to June 2025.
- August 9 – Ministop begins suspending sales of onigiri and other food items in up to 1,600 stores nationwide following reports of employees tampering with expiry dates.
- August 12 – Three people are reported dead following heavy rainstorms in Kyushu.
- August 13 – A ship carrying gravel collides with a yacht off the coast of Tsukumi, Ōita Prefecture, killing one person.
- August 14 – A climber is killed in a bear attack on Mount Rausu in Hokkaido.
- August 15 – A fire breaks out on the Kodama train of the Tokaido Shinkansen at Gifu-Hashima Station while traveling from Shin-Ōsaka Station to Shizuoka, prompting the evacuation of around 250 passengers.
- August 18 – Two JGSDF personnel are found dead from a lightning strike during an exercise at the Hijudai Training Area in Ōita Prefecture.
- August 20 – The US Navy amphibious transport dock ship USS New Orleans catches fire off the coast of Okinawa Island, injuring two sailors.
- August 23 – Eighteen people are injured in a pepper spray incident at the Shibuya Hikarie building in Tokyo.
- August 25 – The statue of the Sengoku period warlord Toyotomi Hideyoshi is found decapitated in Nagoya.
- August 26 – Newspaper companies The Asahi Shimbun and The Nikkei file a lawsuit against Perplexity AI for copyright infringement.
- August 28 – The Shinmoedake volcano in Kyushu erupts for the first time since July.

=== September ===
- September 5 –
  - A tornado hits the city of Makinohara in Shizuoka Prefecture, injuring 89 people.
  - Kushiro Wetlands megasolar issue: Hokkaido governor Naomichi Suzuki warns Japan Ecology to stop the construction of mega solar farms in Kushiro. He also orders an investigation for approximately 1,200 reports of illegal logging in the area to make way for mega solar panels.
- September 6 – Prince Hisahito's coming of age ceremony is held.
- September 7 –
  - Shigeru Ishiba announces his resignation as prime minister and President of the Liberal Democratic Party.
  - The 2025 Mie gubernatorial special election was held. It was won by the incumbent governor Katsuyuki Ichimi.
  - The 2025 Ibaraki gubernatorial special election was held. It was won by the incumbent governor Kazuhiko Ōigawa.
- September 9 – Kushiro Wetlands megasolar issue: Several LDP MPs and environment minister Keiichiro Asao inspect areas outside the Kushiro-shitsugen National Park.
- September 11 – A heavy rainstorm leaves one person dead, causes major flooding in Tokyo and cuts electricity to 7,000 homes.
- September 12 –
  - A United Airlines passenger aircraft makes an emergency landing at Kansai Airport following a fire alarm on board. Two passengers are hospitalized.
  - A record-breaking 123.5 mm (4.86 in) of rainfall hits Yokkaichi in Mie Prefecture causing flooding.
- September 23 – The JASDF sends two F-15 fighter jets to Laage Air Base in Germany as part of its first deployment of aircraft to Europe.
- September 29 – A cyberattack is carried out on Asahi Breweries, causing a massive systems failure.

=== October ===
- October 3 –
  - An overcrowded minivehicle overturns in Nabari, Mie Prefecture, killing five people.
  - One person is killed while another is reported missing following a bear attack in Miyagi Prefecture.
- October 4 – 2025 Liberal Democratic Party (Japan) presidential election: Former minister Sanae Takaichi is elected leader of the LDP.
- October 5 – A passenger train with 149 passengers bound for Shibuya Station collides with an out-of-service train near Kajigaya Station in Kawasaki, Kanagawa on the Den-en-toshi Line, causing the latter to derail. No injuries are reported, but services on parts of the line are suspended for 25 hours, affecting about 650,000 passengers.
- October 6 –
  - A court in France sentences Japan Football Association technical director Masanaga Kageyama to a suspended 18-month prison term and a ban on entering France for 10 years after he was arrested at Charles de Gaulle Airport for viewing child pornography aboard an Air France flight.
  - Shimon Sakaguchi of the University of Osaka is named as a co-recipient of the 2025 Nobel Prize in Medicine for his work on the immune system.
- October 8 – Susumu Kitagawa of Kyoto University is named as a co-recipient of the 2025 Nobel Prize in Chemistry for his work on developing porous materials that can store and release gases.
- October 9 – One person dies after being swept away by strong waves generated by Typhoon Halong in Oiso, Kanagawa Prefecture.
- October 10 – Komeito leaves the LDP-led governing coalition, citing disagreements with LDP leader Sanae Takaichi.
- October 12 – A Filipino climber dies after being stranded on Mount Hotakadake, between Gifu and Nagano Prefectures.
- October 14 – Masanori Aoki is sentenced to death for carrying out the 2023 Nagano attack.
- October 20 – The LDP and the Japan Innovation Party sign an agreement to form a governing coalition.
- October 21 – Sanae Takaichi is confirmed as prime minister by the House of Representatives.
- October 24 – Prime minister Takaichi announces that she will increase Japan's military budget by 2% by March 2026, a goal previously set for 2027.
- October 26 – The 2025 Miyagi gubernatorial election was held. It was won by the incumbent governor Yoshihiro Murai.

=== November ===
- November 5 –
  - The government deploys the JSDF to Akita Prefecture to assist in efforts to decrease bear attacks.
  - Japan resumes exports of seafood to China for the first time since a ban imposed by the latter in 2023 over the discharge of radioactive water of the Fukushima Daiichi Nuclear Power Plant.
- November 9 –
  - NHK Party leader Takashi Tachibana is arrested on charges of defaming Hyōgo Prefectural Assembly member Hideaki Takeuchi during the 2024 Hyogo gubernatorial election.
  - A magnitude 6.8 earthquake hits off the coast of Iwate Prefecture, triggering a tsunami measuring up to 20 cm (7.9 in) high.
  - The 2025 Hiroshima gubernatorial election was held. It was won by the newcomer Mika Yokota becoming the prefecture's first woman governor.
- November 14 – China issues a travel advisory against its citizens going to Japan in response to comments by prime minister Takaichi expressing support for Japanese military intervention in a Chinese invasion of Taiwan.
- November 16 – Sakurajima volcano in Kagoshima Prefecture erupts for the first time since October 2024.
- November 18– A fire breaks out in Oita, damaging 170 buildings and leaving one person dead.
- November 24 – A man driving a stolen car rams into pedestrians in Adachi, Tokyo, killing one person and injuring 11 others.
- November 25 –
  - A magnitude 5.8 earthquake hits Kumamoto Prefecture, injuring one person in Ubuyama.
  - Akira Ogawa resigns as mayor of Maebashi after admitting to visiting love hotels with a senior city official.
- November 28 – The Tokyo High Court upholds the non-recognition of same-sex marriage in Japan.

=== December ===
- December 2– The Japan Coast Guard claims to have expelled two China Coast Guard vessels who tried to intercept a Japanese fishing vessel in the disputed Senkaku Islands.
- December 4 – Governor of Fukui Prefecture Tatsuji Sugimoto resigned following allegation of sexual harassment of government employees.
- December 8 – A magnitude 7.5 earthquake hits off the coast of Aomori Prefecture, resulting in 50 injuries and a tsunami of up to 70 cm (28 in) across northeastern Japan.
- December 11 – Six festivals (Ofune, Murakami Yatai, Hojozu Hachimangu Shrine Hikiyama Tsukiyama and the Otsu Hikiyama), torinoko-shi paper and the nakatsugi-omote tatami mat are recognized as intangible cultural heritage by UNESCO.
- December 15 – Two people are injured in a knife attack at the City Bank HKT48 Theater in Fukuoka.
- December 16 –
  - A 38-year-old man is arrested after injuring 15 male employees in an attack using a knife and bleach at a Yokohama Rubber Company factory in Mishima, Shizuoka. The attack was targeted as an act of "attempted androcide" and revenge for being harassed at his business.
  - A pileup involving 67 vehicles along the Kan-etsu Expressway in Minakami, Gunma, leaves two people dead and 26 others injured.
  - The cabinet approves the military budget for the next year, at record high 58 billion USD (9 trillion yen), aimed to deter China. The plan "focuses on fortifying strike-back capability and coastal defences with surface-to-ship missiles and unmanned arsenals".

== Elections ==
- 2025 Japanese House of Councillors election
- 2025 Tokyo prefectural election
- 2025 Saitama mayoral election
- 2025 Japanese gubernatorial elections

== Sports ==
- September 13–21 – The 2025 World Athletics Championships will be held in Tokyo.
- April 6 – 2025 Formula One World Championship is held at 2025 Japanese Grand Prix
- May 17–18 – 2024–25 Formula E World Championship is held at 2025 Tokyo ePrix
- September 28 – 2025 MotoGP World Championship is held at 2025 Japanese motorcycle Grand Prix
- 2025 F4 Japanese Championship
- 2025 Super Formula Championship
- 2025 Super Formula Lights
- 2025 Super GT Series
- 2025 in Japanese football
- 2025 J1 League
- 2025 J2 League
- 2025 J3 League
- 2025 Japan Football League
- 2025 Japanese Regional Leagues
- 2025 Japanese Super Cup
- 2025 Emperor's Cup
- 2025 J.League Cup

== Deaths ==
=== January ===
- January 3
  - Hiroshi Hara, architect (b. 1936)
  - Yuji Sawa, politician, MP (b. 1948)
- January 4
  - Riro, sea otter (b. 2007)
  - Kanoko Tsutani-Mabuchi, Olympic diver (b. 1938)
- January 16 – Shoji Ueda, cinematographer (b. 1938)
- January 21 – Keiichi Suzuki, speed skater (b. 1942)
- January 25 – Ikujiro Nonaka, theorist and academician (b. 1935)
- January 26 – Kazuyoshi Akiyama, conductor (b. 1941)
- January 28 – Takuro Morinaga, economist (b. 1957)
- January 29 – Atomu Shimojō, actor (b. 1946)

=== February ===
- February 2 – Nobumasa Konagai, manga editor (b. 1930)
- February 3 – Yoshio Yoshida, baseball player (b. 1933)
- February 28
  - Osamu Nishimura, professional wrestler (b. 1971)
  - Ayako Sono, writer and the wife of Shumon Miura (b. 1931)

=== March ===
- March 1 – Monta Mino, television presenter (b. 1944)
- March 11 – Ayumi Ishida, singer and actress (b. 1948)
- March 25 – Masahiro Shinoda, film director and the husband of Shima Iwashita (b. 1931)
- March 26 – Masami Tanabu, politician (b. 1934)

=== April ===
- April 15 – Shūhei Kishimoto, MP (2009–2022) and governor of Wakayama Prefecture (since 2022) (b. 1956)
- April 18
  - Takashi Yamaguchi, actor (b. 1936)
  - Masaaki Koyama, baseball player (b. 1934)
- April 26 – Okagi Hayashi, supercentenarian, oldest living person in Japan (b. 1909)
- April 28 – Shigeru Tsuyuguchi, actor (b. 1932)

=== May ===
- May 20 – Mine Kondō, supercentenarian, oldest living person in Japan (b. 1910)

=== June ===
- June 3 – Shigeo Nagashima, baseball player (b. 1936)
- June 11 – Ayumu Saito, actor (b. 1964)
- June 12
  - Kimiko Nishimoto, photographer and internet celebrity (b. 1928)
  - Shiho Fujimura, actress (b. 1939)
- June 15 – Masuiyama Daishirō II, sumo wrestler (b. 1948)
- June 23 – Terutomo Yamazaki, karateka (b. 1947)

=== July ===
- July 1 – Asahi Sakano, ski jumper (b. 2005)
- July 3 – Nagiko Tono, actress (b. 1979)
- July 5 – Yoshiomi Tamai, founder of Ashinaga (b. 1935)
- July 9 – Masatoshi Naitō, photographer (b. 1938)
- July 18 – Hitomi Obara, wrestler, Olympic champion (2012) (b. 1981)
- July 20 – Masaki Sakurai, guitar maker (b. 1944)
- July 22 – Tsunehiko Kamijō, singer and actor (b. 1940)
- July 29 – Miyoko Hiroyasu, supercentenarian, oldest living person in Japan (b. 1911)

=== August ===
- August 1 – Koji Kinutani, painter (b. 1943)
- August 5 – Tomohiko Hashimoto, professional wrestler (b. 1977)
- August 8 – Grass Wonder, racehorse (b. 1995)
- August 9
  - Hiromasa Urakawa, boxer (b. 1997)
  - NoB, singer (b. 1964)
- August 10 – Kunishige Kamamoto, footballer and politician (b. 1944)
- August 13 – Tomo Sakurai, voice actress (b. 1971)
- August 14 – Sen Sōshitsu XV, tea master, iemoto of Urasenke (1964–2002) (b. 1923)
- August 16 – Kazutoshi Yamada, baseball player (b. 1965)
- August 20 – Tatsuya Nagamine, director (b. 1972)
- August 21 – Saburo Komoto, politician, MP (1992–2000, 2003–2009).
- August 22 – Kaneichi Kanegae, politician, mayor of Shimabara (1980–1992).
- August 27 – Takaya Hashi, voice actor (b. 1952)

=== September ===
- September 2 – Kazuko Yoshiyuki, actress and essayist (b. 1935)
- September 4
  - Yukio Hashi, singer (b. 1943)
  - Shigeru Oda, judge (b. 1924)
- September 5 – Mayumi Narita, Paralympic swimmer (b. 1970)
- September 6 – Maru, Internet cat (b. 2007)
- September 9
  - Haru Urara, racing horse (b. 1996).
  - Asahi Kurizuka, actor (b. 1937)

=== October ===
- October 6 – Yoshihiro Ito, baseball player (b. 1982)
- October 10 – Kazuo Shirane, enka singer (b. 1936)
- October 15 – Kazuo Ikehiro, film director (b. 1929)
- October 16 – Tomonobu Itagaki, video game designer (b. 1967)
- October 17 – Tomiichi Murayama, former Prime Minister of Japan (1994–1996) (b. 1924)

=== November ===
- November 8 – Tatsuya Nakadai, actor (b. 1932)
- November 15 – Hirokazu Shiba, politician (b. 1950)
- November 17 – Toru Rokukawa, football journalist (b. 1957)
- November 28 – Yutaka Ōta, politician (b. 1956)
- November 29 – Tomomichi Nishimura, voice actor (b. 1946)

=== December ===
- December 8
  - Hiroaki Inoue, baseball player (b. 1944)
  - Masato Harada, film director (b. 1949)
- December 14
  - Kōichi Sueyoshi, politician (b. 1934)
  - Ryō Ishihara, voice actor (b. 1931)
- December 17 – Bushi Kozu, politician (b. 1927)
- December 18 – Toranosuke Katayama, politician (b. 1935)
- December 23 – Masashi Ozaki, golfer (b. 1947)
- December 30 – Tetsuzo Fuwa, MP (1969–2003) and chairman of the Japanese Communist Party (1982–1987 and 1989–2000) (b. 1930)

=== Date unknown ===
- Mizuki Itagaki, actor (b. 2000)

== See also ==
=== Country overviews ===
- Japan
- History of Japan
- Outline of Japan
- Government of Japan
- Politics of Japan
- Years in Japan
- Timeline of Japanese history

=== Related timelines for current period ===
- 2025
- 2020s
- 2020s in political history
