= Sueyoshi =

Sueyoshi (written: 末吉) is a Japanese surname. Notable people with the surname include:

- Amy Sueyoshi, American academic
- Kōichi Sueyoshi (末吉興一; 1934–2025), Japanese politician
- Rui Sueyoshi (末吉 塁; born 1996), Japanese footballer
- Shuta Sueyoshi (末吉 秀太; born 1986), Japanese singer, actor and dancer
- Toshiya Sueyoshi (末吉 隼也; born 1987), Japanese footballer

== See also ==
- Sueyoshi, Kagoshima, a former town in Soo District, Kagoshima Prefecture, Japan
