= Fumiko Hayashi =

Fumiko Hayashi may refer to:

- Fumiko Hayashi (author) (林 芙美子, 1903 or 1904 – 1951), Japanese novelist and poet
- Fumiko Hayashi (politician) (林 文子, born 1946), Japanese politician
