= List of international presidential trips made by Joseph Boakai =

Visits by the president of Liberia since 2024

This is a list of international presidential trips made by Joseph Boakai, the 26th and current President of Liberia since January 22, 2024.

== 2024 ==
Country	Areas visited	Date(s)	Notes
Ghana	Accra	13–14 February	Working visit to discuss bilateral cooperation.
Ivory Coast	Abidjan	7 March	One-day state visit to discuss regional security, energy, and agriculture.
Ghana	Accra	28 June	Guest speaker at the 18th commencement ceremony of the Regional Maritime University.
United States	Atlanta	19–25 August	Keynote speaker at the 124th National Black Business Conference.
Indonesia	Bali	1–3 September	Attended the 2nd Indonesia–Africa Forum (IAF) to secure partnerships in infrastructure, agriculture, and trade.
China	Beijing	4–6 September	Attended the 2024 Forum on China–Africa Cooperation (FOCAC) summit.
Canada	Toronto	19–20 September	Attended the Liberia Investment Forum.
United States	New York City	21–28 September	Attended the 79th session of the United Nations General Assembly. Launched Liberia's campaign for a non-permanent seat on the UN Security Council.
Sierra Leone	Freetown	18–21 November	Working visit focused on strengthening cross-border relations.

== 2025 ==
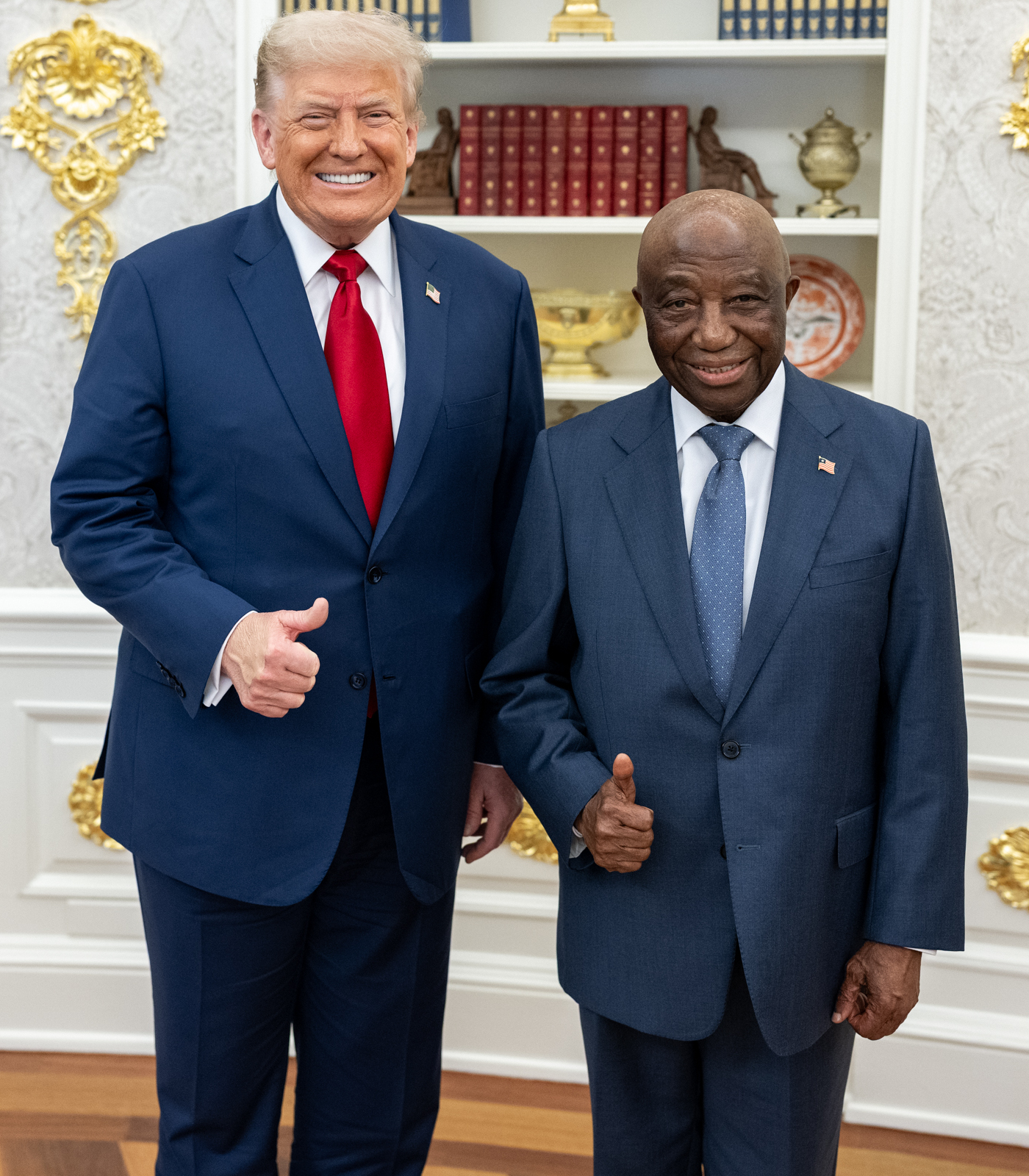
President Trump greets President Boakai of Liberia in the Oval Office, Wednesday, July 9, 2025, before a multilateral luncheon with African leaders.

Country	Areas visited	Date(s)	Notes
Ethiopia	Addis Ababa	13 April	Official state visit hosted by Prime Minister Abiy Ahmed.
United States	Washington, D.C.	9 July	Met with President Donald Trump at the White House to promote U.S. investment in Liberia and regional security.
Japan	Yokohama	20 August	Attended events for TICAD 9 and met with Mayor Takeharu Yamanaka.
United States	New York City	8–30 September	Attended the 80th session of the United Nations General Assembly and engaged with diaspora organizations.

== 2026 ==
Country	Areas visited	Date(s)	Notes
Guinea	Conakry	16 March	High-level tripartite summit to address border tensions in Lofa County.
Ethiopia	Addis Ababa	13 April	Official state visit focused on bilateral relations with Prime Minister Abiy Ahmed.
Kenya	Nairobi	11–12 May	Attended the Africa Forward Summit; met with President William Ruto and French President Emmanuel Macron.
Turkey	Ankara	5–11 July	Working visit including bilateral discussions and a meeting with the Liberian Students Association.
United States	Washington, D.C., New York City, Alexandria, Virginia	14 September–October 6	Travelled to Washington for meetings with congressional leaders before heading to New York for the 81st session of the United Nations General Assembly, where he delivered his address for the General Debate on 24 September. He then returned to Washington to give the keynote speech at the Liberia Annual Diaspora Conference, which was held on 25–27 September in Alexandria, Virginia.
Sierra Leone	Bo	18 October	Private visit to attend the 5th anniversary thanksgiving service of the Omega Fire Baptist Church in Bo, where he was guest of honour. During this visit, Sierra Leonean Trade Minister Alpha Ibrahim Sesay attended on behalf of President Julius Maada Bio.

== See also ==
- 2023 Liberian general election
- Foreign relations of Liberia
- List of international presidential trips made by George Weah, his predecessor
