= Riro (sea otter) =

Last male sea otter in a Japanese aquarium

- Other names: Riro-kun (リロくん), Charming Old Gentleman Otter (イケおじラッコ)
- Species: Sea otter
- Sex: Male
- Born: March 30, 2007; Shirahama, Wakayama, Japan
- Died: January 4, 2025 (aged 17); Higashi-ku, Fukuoka, Japan
- Residence: Marine World Uminonakamichi
- Mate: Mana (マナ)

Riro (リロ, Riro; 30 March 2007 – 4 January 2025) was a male sea otter at Marine World Uminonakamichi. He was the last male sea otter at a Japanese aquarium, and one of the last three remaining sea otters of any gender in Japanese aquaria.

Nicknamed the ike-oji-rakko (イケおじラッコ), or Charming Old Gentleman Otter, because of his advanced age, Riro was also known for his relationship with longtime female companion Mana, for his predictions of Japanese sporting events, and as the elder brother of Toba Aquarium's female sea otter Kira.

== Background and early life ==
Japanese aquaria began exhibiting sea otters in the 1980s, reaching a peak in 1994 with over 120 sea otters found in Japanese facilities, most of them rescues imported from the United States. However, the end of sea otter imports from America in 1998 as a result of revisions to CITES, combined with the difficulty of breeding sea otters in captivity over multiple generations, led to a stark decline in their population. By 2017 there were only ten sea otters remaining, and in 2022 that number dwindled to three: Kira and May at the Toba Aquarium and Riro at Marine World Uminonakamichi.

Riro and Kira were born to parents Khan and Flora at Adventure World before being transferred to their later residences. Riro arrived at Marine World Uminonakamichi in 2012.

== Appearance, habits, and fan following ==
Sea otters experienced a surge of popularity on social media in Japan during the COVID-19 pandemic with many viral videos of Riro, Kira, and May garnering millions of views. Marine World received flower bouquets and letters dedicated to Riro from across the country, and fans made the trek from distant locales such as Tokyo and Osaka to see Riro in person.

Riro was known to have an affectionate relationship with a female sea otter named Mana, who was born at Marine World Uminonakamichi in 2012. They were often seen frolicking and cuddling, and would vocalize with each other to signal their presence. In February 2021 Mana became pregnant with Riro's pup, but both died from a uterine infection. After Mana's death, Riro no longer vocalized for the remainder of his life.

Riro was described by his caretakers as having a gentle demeanor and he showed interest in aquarium visitors, often approaching them near his glass panel, but he would become enraptured while handling an enrichment toy, almost as if his personality had changed. Riro was used to predict Japan's performances in sporting events, including predicting a Japanese loss to the German basketball team at the 2024 Paris Olympics.

== Death ==
As a 17-year old male sea otter, Riro was roughly the age of a 70-year old human. On 27 December 2024, Riro began losing his appetite and was taken off exhibit. His condition worsened and he died on 4 January 2025. With Riro's death, Marine World Uminonakamichi's sea otter exhibit, dating back to 1989, came to an end. Riro's death was covered by Japan's major newspapers such as the Asahi Shimbun, the Mainichi Shimbun, and the Chunichi Shimbun.

Fans brought flowers and gifts to the memorial stand set up in front of Riro's old habitat. Fans and visitors also paid their respects on social media. Jeffrey J. Hall, a lecturer at the Kanda University of International Studies, reported that the otter's affectionate name Riro-kun (リロくん) had quickly become the top trending term on Japanese Twitter. Marine World Uminonakamichi's tweet informing the public of Riro's death garnered well over 10 million views.

Tokyo bookstore Shosen Grande announced that it would display images of Riro in its store and brought attention to Rirobon (リロぼん), a picture book dedicated to Riro. Shinya, the drummer for Dir En Grey, stated that copies of Rirobon had sold out at Shosen Grande the next day.
