= 2025 Yokohama mayoral election =

- 3 August 2025
- Turnout: 41.64% ▼7.41%
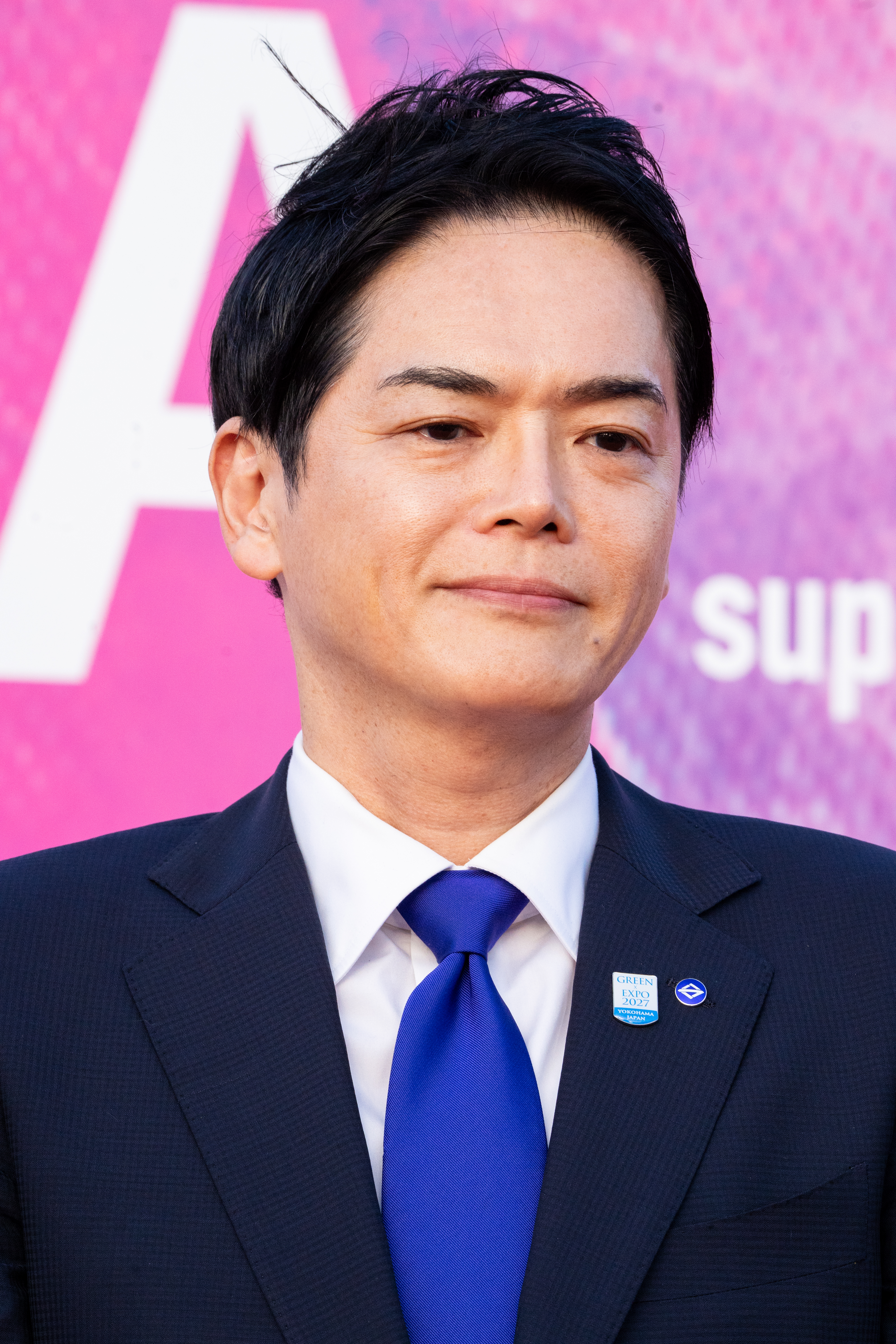

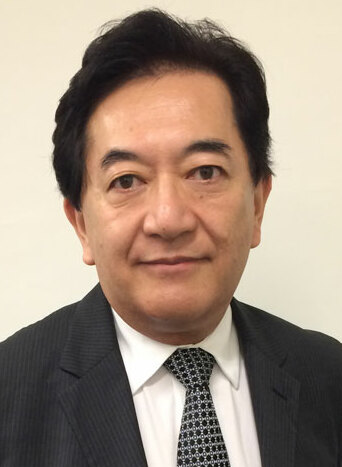
Candidate	Takeharu Yamanaka	Yasuo Tanaka	Atsushi Fukuyama
Party	Independent	Independent	Independent
Popular vote	663,876	264,740	148,236
Percentage	52.00%	20.74%	11.61%
Supported by	LDP, Komeito, CDP
Mayor before election
Takeharu Yamanaka
Independent
Elected mayor
Takeharu Yamanaka
Independent

The 2025 Yokohama mayoral election was held on 3 August 2025 to elect the next mayor of Yokohama.

== Candidates ==
A total of 6 candidates registered candidacies for the election.

Name	Age	Party	Title
Takeharu Yamanaka （山中竹春）	52	Independent (Note: supported by LDP, Komeito, CDP.)	Mayor of Yokohama（Current） Former Professor of public health at Yokohama City University
Norimi Takahashi （高橋徳美）	56	Independent	Former Yokohama City Council member
Yasuo Tanaka （田中康夫）	69	Independent	Former Governor of Nagano Prefecture
Naoaki Saito （斉藤直明）	60	Independent	Former Automotive Manufacturing Company Employee
Masatake Koyama （小山正武）	76	Independent	Executive Board Member of the Vegetable Wholesale Company
Atsushi Fukuyama （福山敦士）	36	Independent	Owner of Kagawa Olive Guyners

=== Declined ===
- Taro Suzuki, Member of the Yokohama City Council
  - At a press conference on March 27, 2025, Suzuki expressed a desire to run, stating, "I intend to build the future of Yokohama as its mayor." However, according to sources, Suzuki told those around him the following day, March 28, "I will not run." On the 30th, Shigeru Sato, head of the LDP's Yokohama chapter, said, "[Suzuki] agreed to the executive committee's persuasion and promised, 'I deeply apologize for the trouble caused. I made a slip of the tongue. I will not run in the mayoral election.'"

== Party's endorsement ==
- The LDP gave up on fielding its own candidate and backed Yamanaka. Shigeru Sato, head of the LDP's Yokohama chapter, stated, "We have approached matters on a case-by-case basis, such as adding supplementary opinions to budget proposals. We received a request for support from Mr. Yamanaka and made our decision after due consideration." Sato noted that they would consider Yokohama's future while maintaining a relationship of healthy tension. Meanwhile, regarding Norimi Takahashi, an LDP member and Yokohama City Assembly member who declared her candidacy, Sato harshly criticized her, saying, "She has openly disrupted party unity by declaring her run for mayor. Criticism is mounting within the party calling it an anti-party act, and I feel deep indignation."
- Komeito backed Yamanaka through its three regional chapters in Yokohama (East Yokohama, South Yokohama, and West Yokohama).
- CDP decided to back Yamanaka, as it did in the previous election
- While the JCP Kanagawa Prefectural Committee withheld party support for Yamanaka whom it had backed in the previous election due to criticism of policies such as large-scale public works projects, it did not field a candidate of its own.

== Results ==
Incumbent Yamanaka won reelection in a landslide victory, defeating the runners-up by a wide margin.

Yokohama mayoral election, 2025
Party	Candidate	Votes	%	±%
Independent	Takeharu Yamanaka	663,876	52.00	
Independent	Yasuo Tanaka	264,740	20.74	
Independent	Atsushi Fukuyama	148,236	11.61	
Independent	Norimi Takahashi	115,939	9.08	
Independent	Naoaki Saito	50,454	3.95	
Independent	Masatake Koyama	33,512	2.62	
Total valid votes		1,276,757	100.00	
Turnout		1,292,363	41.64	▼7.41
Registered electors		3,103,689		

Results by Ward
Ward	Takeharu Yamanaka		Yasuo Tanaka		Atsushi Fukuyama		Norimi Takahashi		Naoaki Saito		Masatake Koyama	
Ward	Votes	%	Votes	%	Votes	%	Votes	%	Votes	%	Votes	%
Total	663,876	52.00%	264,740	20.74%	148,236	11.61%	115,939	9.08%	50,454	3.95%	33,512	2.62%
Tsurumi	41,394	46.83%	20,123	22.77%	11,339	12.83%	7,786	8.81%	5,142	5.82%	2,604	2.95%
Kanagawa	39,542	48.87%	17,382	21.48%	9,925	12.27%	6,772	8.37%	4,145	5.12%	3,150	3.89%
Nishi	17,243	46.98%	8,675	23.64%	4,764	12.98%	3,129	8.53%	1,693	4.61%	1,197	3.26%
Naka	21,133	44.85%	12,120	25.72%	5,304	11.26%	4,757	10.10%	2,614	5.55%	1,192	2.53%
Minami	30,520	50.20%	13,755	22.62%	6,220	10.23%	5,858	9.64%	2,856	4.70%	1,590	2.62%
Kōnan	41,348	54.16%	14,852	19.45%	8,202	10.74%	6,903	9.04%	2,753	3.61%	2,284	2.99%
Hodogaya	36,460	52.79%	14,389	20.83%	8,191	11.86%	5,468	7.92%	2,666	3.86%	1,889	2.74%
Asahi	47,275	56.81%	15,896	19.10%	8,777	10.55%	6,220	7.47%	2,905	3.49%	2,145	2.58%
Isogo	29,605	52.64%	11,297	20.09%	6,147	10.93%	5,611	9.98%	2,164	3.85%	1,420	2.52%
Kanazawa	35,881	48.83%	11,164	15.19%	5,440	7.40%	17,663	24.04%	2,018	2.75%	1,319	1.79%
Kōhoku	63,744	50.16%	28,039	22.06%	16,616	13.08%	9,451	7.44%	5,087	4.00%	4,139	3.26%
Midori	33,033	54.43%	12,159	20.03%	7,195	11.85%	4,775	7.87%	2,165	3.57%	1,366	2.25%
Aoba	55,026	52.01%	22,633	21.39%	15,333	14.49%	7,156	6.76%	3,581	3.38%	2,064	1.95%
Tsuzuki	39,507	52.35%	16,008	21.21%	9,859	13.06%	5,679	7.52%	2,658	3.52%	1,761	2.33%
Totsuka	55,880	55.88%	19,485	19.48%	11,279	11.28%	7,778	7.78%	3,426	3.43%	2,156	2.16%
Sakae	25,565	57.48%	8,471	19.05%	4,560	10.25%	3,551	7.98%	1,369	3.08%	957	2.15%
Izumi	28,965	56.09%	10,336	20.02%	5,073	9.82%	4,177	8.09%	1,827	3.54%	1,260	2.44%
Seya	21,755	55.31%	7,956	20.23%	4,012	10.20%	3,205	8.15%	1,385	3.52%	1,019	2.59%
