= 2021 Yokohama mayoral election =

- 22 August 2021
- Turnout: 49.05% (▲11.84pp)
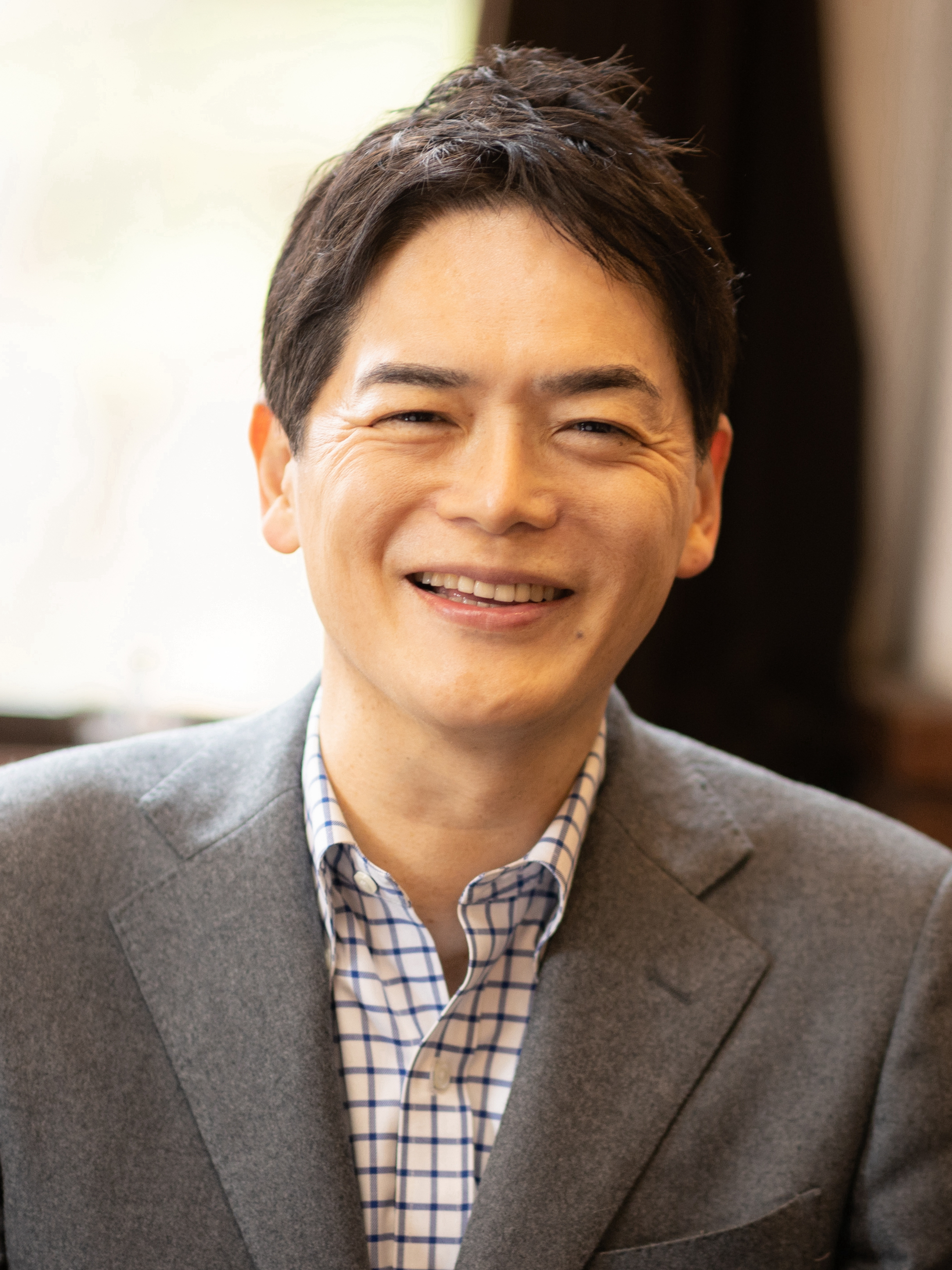

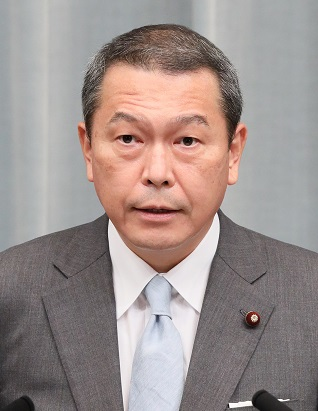

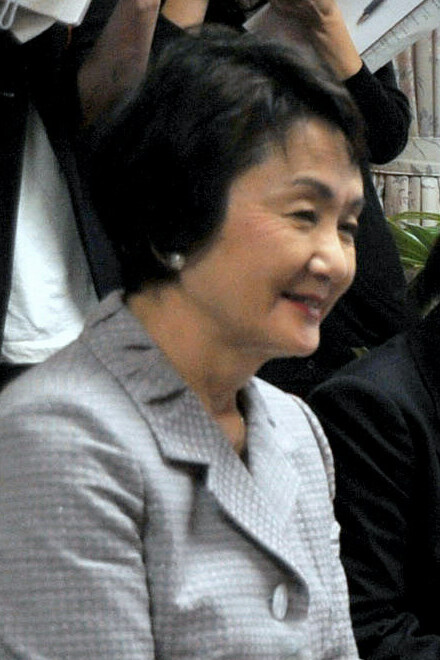

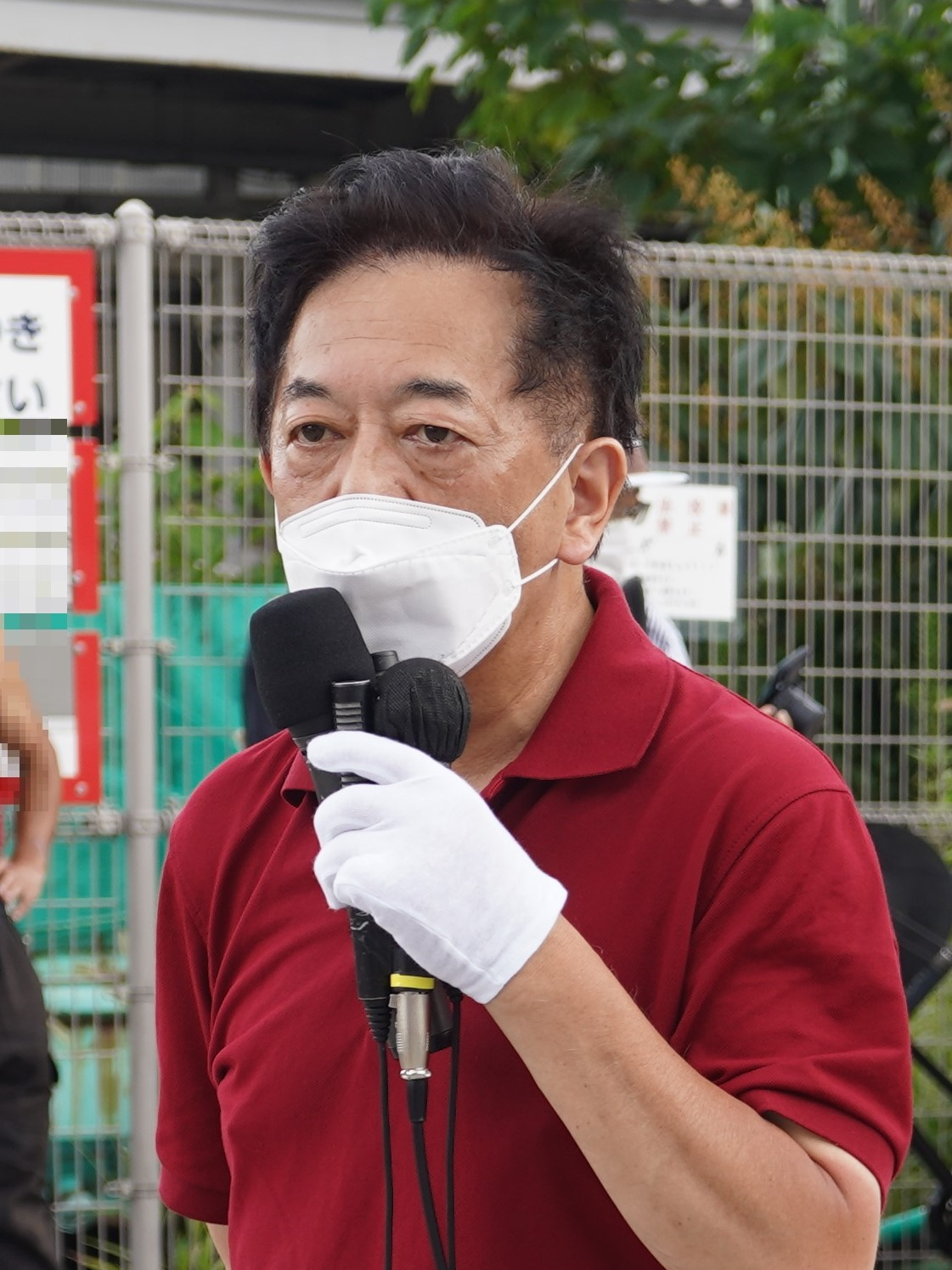

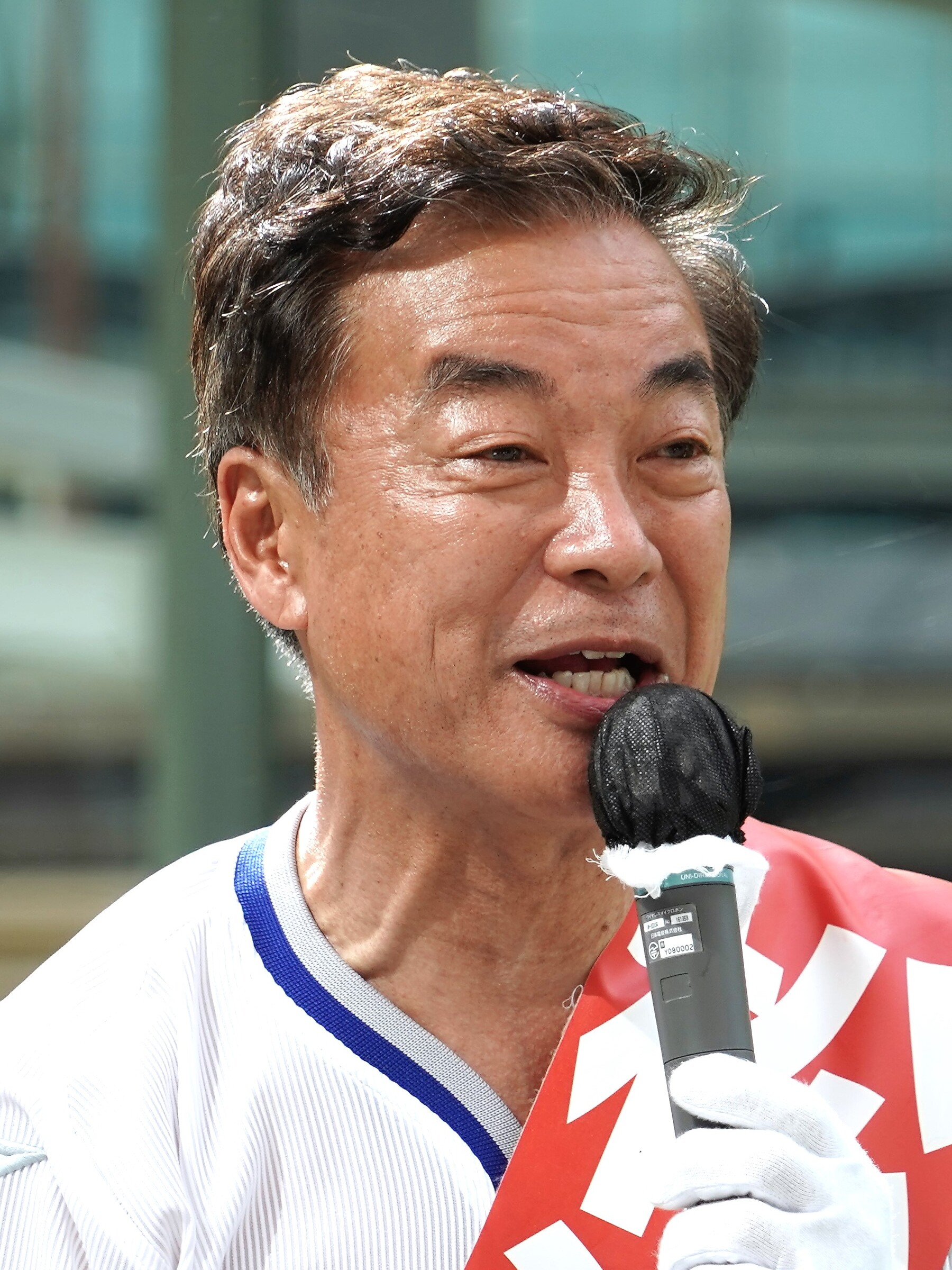
Candidate	Takeharu Yamanaka	Hachiro Okonogi	Fumiko Hayashi
Party	Independent	Independent	Independent
Popular vote	506,392	325,947	196,926
Percentage	33.59%	21.62%	13.06%
Supported by	CDP, JCP, SDP	LDP
Candidate	Yasuo Tanaka	Shigefumi Matsuzawa
Party	Independent	Independent
Popular vote	194,713	162,206
Percentage	12.92%	10.76%
Supported by		Ishin
- Election results by wards
Mayor before election
Fumiko Hayashi
Independent
Elected mayor
Takeharu Yamanaka
Independent

The 2021 Yokohama mayoral election was held on 22 August 2021 to elect the next mayor of Yokohama. The central issue in the election was the building of an "integrated resort" IR featuring a casino.

Incumbent mayor Fumiko Hayashi lost reelection, placing third to the LDP supported Hachiro Okonogi and the eventual winner, CDP and JCP supported Takeharu Yamanaka.

== Candidates ==
A total of 8 candidates registered candidacies for the election.

Name	Age	Title	Official website
Masataka Ota （太田正孝）	75	Former Yokohama City Council member	Masataka Ota (Japanese)
Yasuo Tanaka （田中康夫）	65	Former Governor of Nagano Prefecture	Yasuo Tanaka (Japanese)
Hachiro Okonogi （小此木八郎）	56	Former Chairperson of the National Public Safety Commission	Hachiro Okonogi officialsite (Japanese)
Yoshikazu Tsubokura （坪倉良和）	70	Fisheries wholesaler president	Yoshikazu Tsubokura (A revolutionary grandfather who changes Japan from Yokohama!) (Japanese)
Mineyuki Fukuda （福田峰之）	57	Former Member of the House of Representatives	Mineyuki Fukuda (Japanese)
Takeharu Yamanaka （山中竹春）	48	Professor of public health at Yokohama City University	Takeharu Yamanaka OFFICIAL WEB SITE (Japanese)
Fumiko Hayashi （林文子）	75	Mayor of Yokohama（Current）	Fumiko Hayashi officialsite (Japanese)
Shigefumi Matsuzawa （松沢成文）	63	Former Governor of Kanagawa Prefecture	Shigefumi Matsuzawa (Japanese)

== Results ==
Yokohama mayoral election 22 August 2021
Party	Candidate	Votes	%	±%
Independent (Supported by Constitutional Democratic Party, Communist Party of Japan, Social Democratic Party)	Takeharu Yamanaka	506,392	33.59%	N/A
Independent (Supported by Liberal Democratic Party of Japan)	Hachiro Okonogi	325,947	21.62%	N/A
Independent	Fumiko Hayashi (incumbent)	196,926	13.06%	▼39.43%
Independent	Yasuo Tanaka	194,713	12.92%	N/A
Independent (Supported by Ishin)	Shigefumi Matsuzawa	162,206	10.76%	N/A
Independent	Mineyuki Fukuda	62,455	4.14%	N/A
Independent	Masataka Ota	39,802	2.64%	N/A
Independent	Yoshikazu Tsubokura	19,113	1.27%	N/A
