= List of international presidential trips made by George Weah =

This is a list of international presidential trips made by George Weah, the 25th President of Liberia from January 22, 2018 to January 22, 2024.

== List ==
=== 2018 ===
Country	Areas visited	Date(s)	Notes
Ethiopia	Addis Ababa	28 January	Attended the 30th Ordinary Session of the African Union Assembly.
Senegal	Dakar	14–16 February	Working visit. Met with President Macky Sall.
Morocco	Rabat	16–20 February	Working visit to strengthen bilateral relations.
France	Paris	21–23 February	Official visit. Met with President Emmanuel Macron.
Ivory Coast	Abidjan	4–5 April	State visit. Met with President Alassane Ouattara.
Ghana	Accra	6–7 April	Working visit. Met with President Nana Akufo-Addo.
Togo	Lomé	13–14 April	Attended the Extraordinary Summit of ECOWAS Heads of State and Government.
Sierra Leone	Freetown	12 May	Working visit to attend the inauguration of President Julius Maada Bio.
Belgium	Brussels	5–6 June	Attended European Development Days.
Togo	Lomé	29–31 July	Attended the 53rd Ordinary Session of the ECOWAS Authority of Heads of State and Government.
China	Beijing	27 August – 9 September	State visit and attended the Forum on China–Africa Cooperation (FOCAC) Summit. Met with Chinese President Xi Jinping.

=== 2019 ===
Country	Areas visited	Date(s)	Notes
Senegal	Dakar	7–10 January	Attended the CAF Awards ceremony.
Israel	Jerusalem	26 February – 1 March	Official visit. Met with Prime Minister Benjamin Netanyahu and President Reuven Rivlin.
United Arab Emirates	Abu Dhabi	17–19 March	Working visit to discuss infrastructure investments.
Nigeria	Abuja	12 June	Attended Nigeria's Democracy Day celebrations.
Guinea	Conakry	11–13 July	Two-day state visit. Met with President Alpha Condé.
Japan	Yokohama	24–30 August	Attended the 7th Tokyo International Conference on African Development (TICAD7).
Burkina Faso	Ouagadougou	13–14 September	Attended the Extraordinary ECOWAS Summit on Terrorism.
Niger	Niamey	8 November	Attended the Extraordinary ECOWAS Summit on Guinea-Bissau.

=== 2020 ===
Country	Areas visited	Date(s)	Notes
Ivory Coast	Abidjan	14 December	Attended the inauguration of President Alassane Ouattara.

=== 2021 ===
Country	Areas visited	Date(s)	Notes
Ghana	Accra	30 May	Attended the Extraordinary ECOWAS Summit on Mali.
France	Paris	28 June – 3 July	Official working visit. Attended the Generation Equality Forum.
France	Paris	11–12 November	Attended the 75th Anniversary of UNESCO and the Paris Peace Forum.

=== 2022 ===
Country	Areas visited	Date(s)	Notes
Morocco	Tangier	1 November	Attended the 14th edition of the MEDays Forum.
France	Paris	9–13 November	Attended the Paris Peace Forum.
Monaco	Monaco	14–17 November	Attended the Peace and Sport International Forum.
Qatar	Doha	18–27 November	Attended the opening of the 2022 FIFA World Cup.
United States	Washington, D.C.	11–15 December	Attended the United States–Africa Leaders Summit.

=== 2023 ===
Country	Areas visited	Date(s)	Notes
United States	Washington, D.C.	17 March	Working visit.
United Arab Emirates	Abu Dhabi	18–27 March	Working visit to discuss bilateral initiatives.
Israel	Jerusalem	3–5 July	Official visit. Met with Prime Minister Benjamin Netanyahu and President Isaac Herzog.
United States	New York City	17–20 September	Attended the 78th session of the United Nations General Assembly.

== See also ==
- 2017 Liberian general election
- Foreign relations of Liberia
- List of international presidential trips made by Joseph Boakai, his successor
