= Soccer Digest =

Japanese sports publication

Soccer Digest (Japanese: サッカーダイジェスト) is a serialized sports enthusiast publication by Nippon Sports Kikaku Publishing inc.. Tōru Rokkawa was the editor-in-chief, who took the lead in making a weekly publication.

== History ==
In 1978, serial publication Soccer Digest was founded as only a monthly issue. By 1992 it was being published every two weeks, and by 1993, due in part to the efforts of their editor-in-chief, Tōru Rokkawa, it had become a weekly publication. At the same time, rival magazine Soccer Magazine (サッカーマガジン) had also become a weekly publication, meaning there were two competing soccer magazines in Japan. In October 2013, Soccer Magazine stopped publishing weekly and returned to being a monthly publication, making Soccer Digest for the time being the only weekly publication. In December 2014, following 21 years of serialized weekly publication, weekly publication ended, and the work was only to be released every two Thursdays. On July 10, 2023, Soccer Digest became a monthly publication.

== Content ==
The main stories are things like Serujio Echigo no tengoku to jigoku (セルジオ越後の天国と地獄, Sérgio Echigo's Heavens and Hells) and similar stories. Fumio Murayama's 4-Koma Suupaa Sabu!! gekijou (スーパーさぶっ!!劇場, Super Sabu!! Theater) also earned popularity. Presently, Her work is published in Gekisaka（Kodansha) under the new name gekisabu (ゲキさぶっ!!, Gekisabu). The series is updated every Wednesday, Thursday, Friday — three times a week.

During the 2002 FIFA World Cup, the sister magazine World Soccer Digest EXTRA (ワールドサッカーダイジェストEXTRA) ran as a daily-issue publication. Additionally, with every issue came a poster attached as an addition.

== Milestone covers ==
| Issue | Date issued | Cover |
|---|---|---|
| Issue #1 | December 1979 | Trevor Francis |
| Issue #500 | January 5, 2000 | Pelé, Diego Maradona, Johan Cruyff, Zico, Franz Beckenbauer, Michel Platini, Roberto Baggio, Kunishige Kamamoto, Kazuyoshi Miura, Hidetoshi Nakata |
| Issue #1000 | May 5, 2009 | Hidetoshi Nakata |
| Issue #1500 | February 10, 2022 | J.League Best XI |

== See also ==
- Sports magazine
- Tōru Rokkawa（original editor-in-chief）
