= Bushi Kozu =

Japanese politician (1927–2025)

Bushi Kozu (Japanese: 神津武士; February 11, 1927 – December 17, 2025) was a Japanese politician.

== Life and career ==
Kozu was born in Nagano Prefecture on February 11, 1927. During the 1950s and 1960s, he was a member of the Saku City Council Member. In 1977, he was elected as the mayor of Saku, a position he held for three terms, between April 27, 1977 – April 26, 1989.

In 2015, he was awarded the Order of the Rising Sun by the Order of the Elderly.

Kozu died on December 17, 2025, at the age of 98.
