= Yutaka Ōta =

Japanese politician (1956–2025)

Yutaka Ōta (Japanese: 太田寛; 19 September 1956 – 28 November 2025) was a Japanese politician.

== Life and career ==
Ōta was born 19 September 1956 in Nagano Prefecture. After graduating from Nagano Prefecture Matsumoto Fukashi High School, he went on to the Faculty of Law at Kyoto University. Following graduation from university in 1979, he joined the Nagano Prefectural Office. After a brief period in Los Angeles from 1990, he returned to Japan in 1993, and was a member of the Nagano Olympic Winter Games Organizing Committee (NAOC).

In 2021, he ran for the Azumino mayoral election and was successfully elected. On 6 October 2025, he was re-elected without a vote, the first time this had happened since the establishment of Azumino City.

He died 28 November 2025, aged 69.
