= Takuro Morinaga =

Japanese economist (1957–2025)

Takuro Morinaga (森永卓郎, Morinaga Takurō; 12 July 1957 – 28 January 2025) was a Japanese economist and academic at Dokkyo University, Saitama, a suburb to Tokyo. He was also a television program editor. As an economist he was highly publicized, expressing his views in television and radio on an array of subjects, from politics to manga to video games. His ideas elicited a large number of reactions on the internet and in media.

== Life and career ==
=== Background ===
At the age of 9, Morinaga began collecting model cars after his father gave him one. Eventually he possessed over 20,000 miniature cars.

On 27 December 2023, Morinaga announced that he had stage IV pancreatic cancer. He died on 28 January 2025, at the age of 67.

=== Career ===
==== Otaku ====
In 2006, Takuro Morinaga estimated the global market for otaku to be between 26 billion and 34 billion dollars.

==== Tax on the beautiful ====
Morinaga proposed increased taxes on men who are beautiful and rich, stating this on Nippon TV, which caused quite an Internet stir.

His proposal intended to model the tax according to the appearance of the taxpayer. His idea was that if the ugly are tax-advantaged, they would have an easier time being charming and engaging in dating, which would result in more marriages, increasing birth and growth in Japan. His proposal classified single men into four broad categories: the hunks, the normal, the moderately ugly, and the ugly. These groups would have been developed by a beauty assessment board consisting of a jury of five women selected at random.

Takuro Morinaga was long interested in the issue of single people and published two books on the topic: Akujo to shinshi no keizaigaku (The economics of the femme fatale and the gentleman, 1996), and Hikon no susume (Incitement for celibacy, 1997).

== Works ==
- Akujo to shinshi no keizaigaku (The economics of the femme fatale and the gentleman, 1996)
- Hikon no susume (Incitement for celibacy, 1997)
- Surviving in an Era of ¥3 Million Annual Income (2003)
