= Marine World Uminonakamichi =

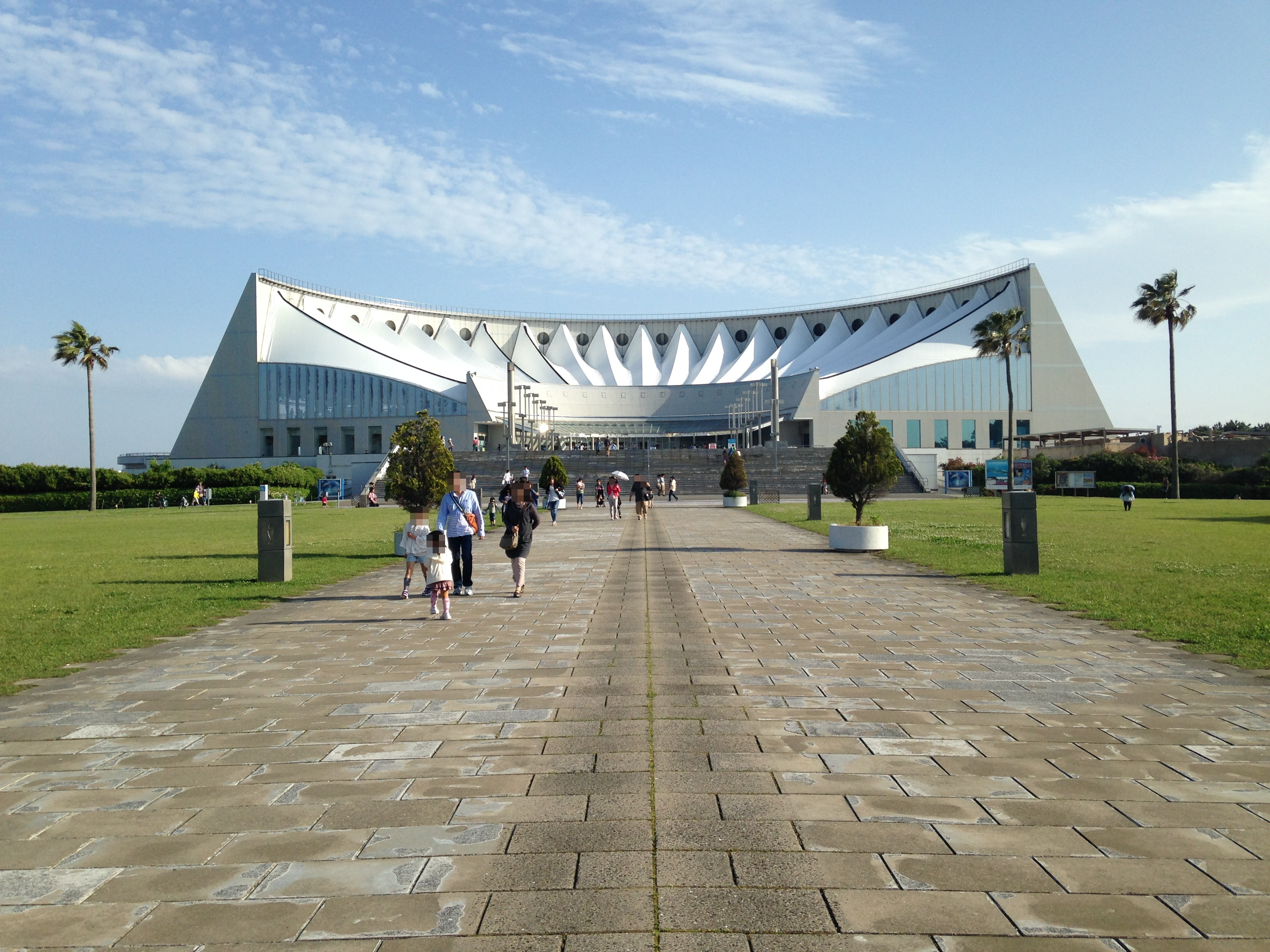
- Marine World Uminonakamichi
- Interactive map of Marine World Uminonakamichi
- 33°39′39″N 130°21′48″E
- Date opened: April 18, 1989
- Location: Higashi-ku, Fukuoka, Japan
- Land area: 21,079 m^{2} (226,890 ft^{2})
- No. of animals: 20,000
- No. of species: 350
- Volume of largest tank: 2,000,000 litres (528,000 US gal)
- Total volume of tanks: 6,422,000 litres (1,697,000 US gal)
- Memberships: JAZA
- Website: www.marine-world.co.jp/english/index.html

Marine World Uminonakamichi (マリンワールド海の中道, Marin-wārudō-Uminonakamichi) is a public aquarium in Higashi-ku, Fukuoka, Fukuoka Prefecture, Japan. It is a member of the Japanese Association of Zoos and Aquariums (JAZA), and the aquarium is accredited as a Museum-equivalent facilities by the Museum Act from Ministry of Education, Culture, Sports, Science and Technology.

== History ==
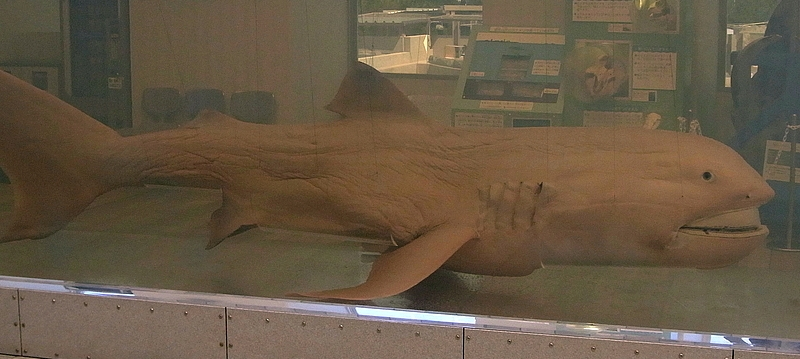
Megamouth shark specimen preserved at Marine World Uminonakamichi

It opened in April 1989 and was renovated and expanded in April 1995. Since 2000, it has been open at night mainly during the summer vacation. A formalin specimen of a megamouth (female) that was washed ashore in Hakata Bay in 1994 is on display.

Water park is located on the site of Uminonakamichi Seaside Park located in Sandbar called "Uminonakamichi". Surrounded by the sea and parks, it is in an environment rich in nature, away from the hustle and bustle of the city, although it is in Fukuoka city. The building with a seashell motif has a semi-circular design, which is a characteristic appearance of a tent-shaped roof fixed with wires. The mascot character is "Mega Tot" with the motif of Megamouth. The character design is "Norio Hikone" designed by Uncle Carl.

The entire building was closed from October 3, 2016 and reopened on April 12, 2017 in order to carry out a major renovation to replace 90% of the aquarium. The new exhibition theme is "Kyushu Sea".

== Exhibits ==
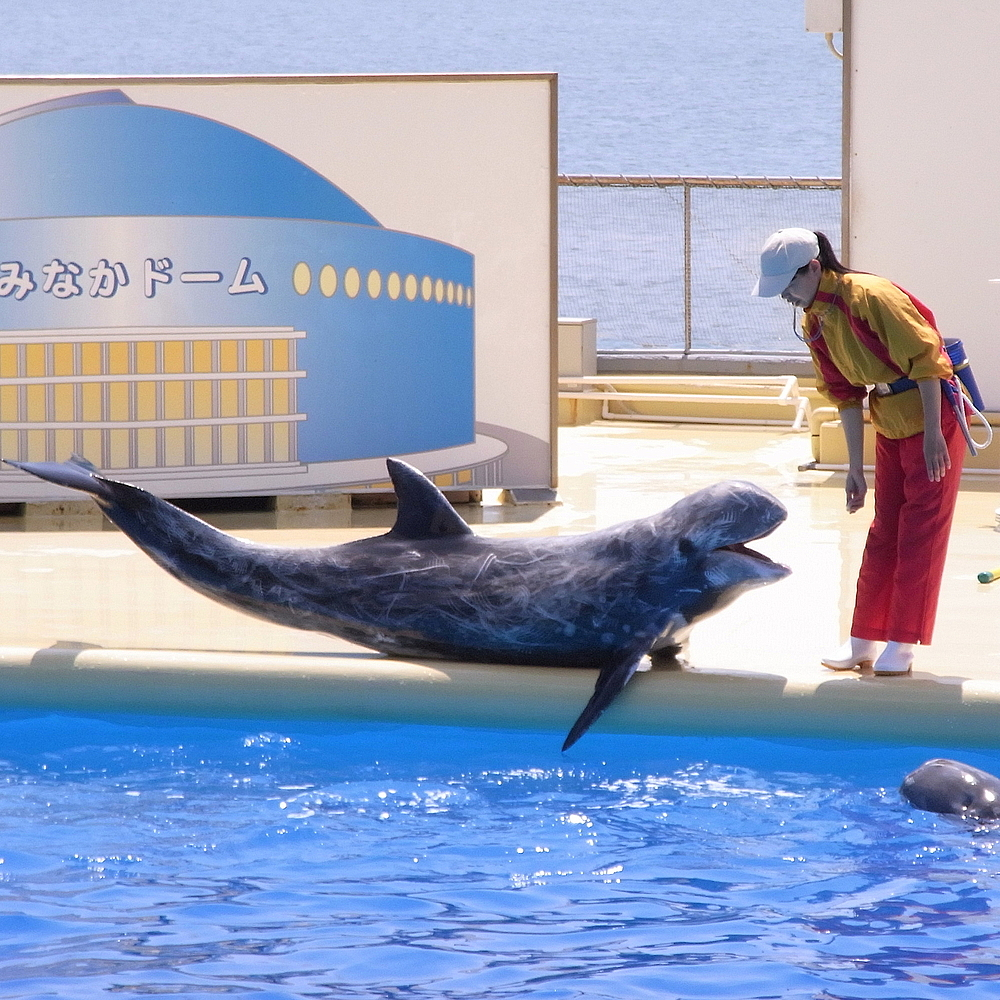
Risso's Dolphin Show

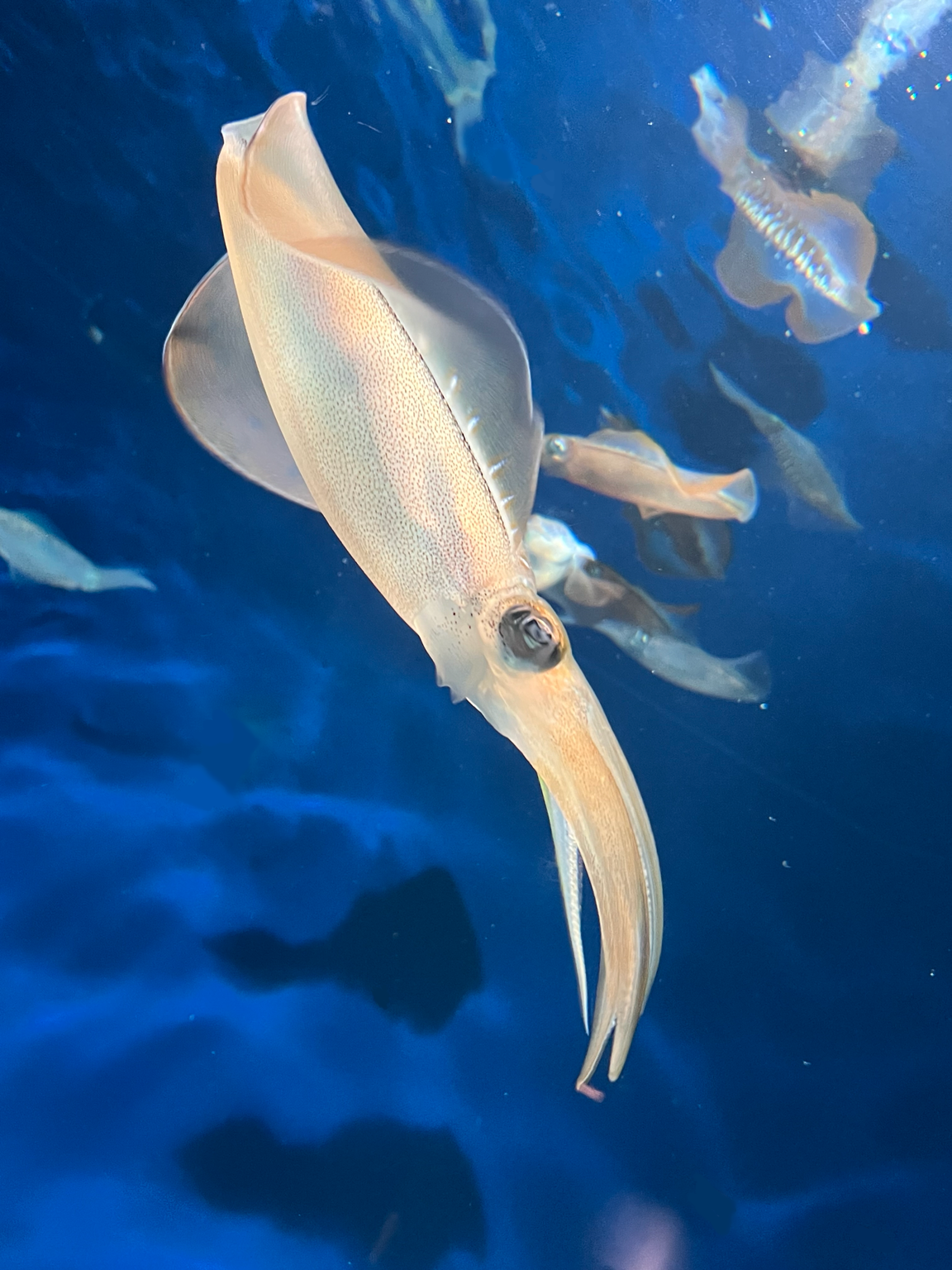
Squid in Marine World Uminonakamichi

The aquarium focuses on the aquatic life of Tsushima's warm current and is made up of a total of 70 tanks. The three largest contain 2,000 m^{3} (530,000 US gal), 1,400 m^{3} (370,000 US gal) and 720 m^{3} (190,000 US gal) respectively. The largest is used for dolphin and sea lion shows, the middle contains more than 120 sharks of 20 species, while the last is for dolphins. There are 20,000 fish of 350 types from tropical to temperate and boreal zones. In addition to fish, dolphins, harbor seals, sea otters, and sea turtles are on display in the museum. The highlights are the dolphin and sea lion show and the large panoramic tanks where giant sand tiger sharks swim.

The large panoramic water tank "Kyushu pelagic" that runs from the 1st floor to the 2nd floor of the building is a water tank of 24 m (79 ft) x 10 m (33 ft), depth of 7 m (23 ft), and water volume of 1,400 m^{3} (370,000 US gal). The acrylic panel that makes up the aquarium is about 30 cm thick. More than 20,000 fish of 80 species migrate in this tank. In the panoramic aquarium, you can watch live images taken by divers with an underwater camera, and listen to conversations and commentary with divers with microphones.

Other marine mammals at the aquarium include sea otters and spotted seals. Show pool There are Bottlenose dolphins, Pacific white-sided dolphins, Risso's dolphins, and Short-finned pilot whales in the pool where the dolphin and sea lion shows are held. Located on the 2nd and 3rd floors, there are bleachers in front of the pool. Three pools on both sides and the back of the show pool are arranged so as to surround the show pool. Marine World has a restaurant in front of the show pool on the 1st floor.

To commemorate the 20th anniversary of its opening, it was completed in April 2009 in the area adjacent to the existing dolphin pool, and on the 18th of the same month, which marks the 20th anniversary, "Kaiju Island" was opened. It is a facility for breeding and exhibiting marine mammals, and has two large and small tanks where California sea lions and Spotted seals live. It is a two-story building where you can also observe. A columnar aquarium (1.5m in diameter and 2.8m in height) is also installed, and an action exhibition using the habit of seals that rise vertically to the surface of the water for breathing is held.

== Facilities ==
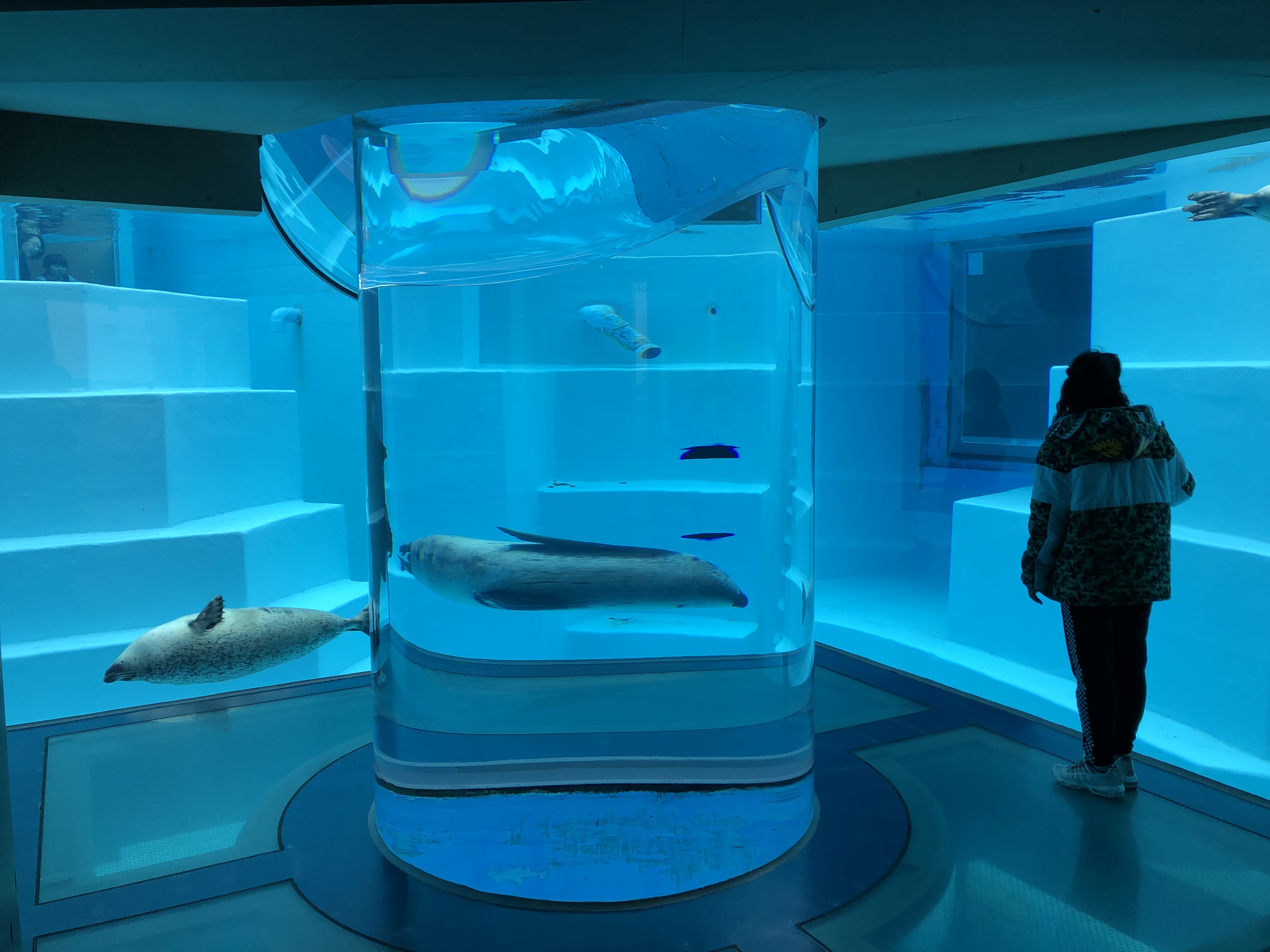
Facility "Kaiju Island" created to commemorate the 20th anniversary.

A dolphin show is held every day at this all-weather with a seating capacity of 1,465.

- Kaiju Island
- Marine Science Lab (3F)
- Near sea Kyushu(3F)
- Aso forest(3F)
- Marine Theater (Show Pool)(3F ~ 2F)
- Atrium water tank (3F ~ 2F)
- Fantasy slope (3F ~ 2F)
- Marine Hall (2F)
- Tanken Beach (2F)
- Sea otter pool (2F)
- Panorama large tank "Kyushu pelagic"(1F ~ 2F)
- Finless porpoise pool (1F)
- Penguins pool (1F)
- Sea turtle aquarium (1F)
- Lawn Square (1F)

There are various types such as aquariums that change with the seasons.

== See also ==
- Ministry of Land, Infrastructure, Transport and Tourism(Business entity)
