= Fumiko Hayashi (politician) =

Japanese politician (born 1946)

- 林 文子
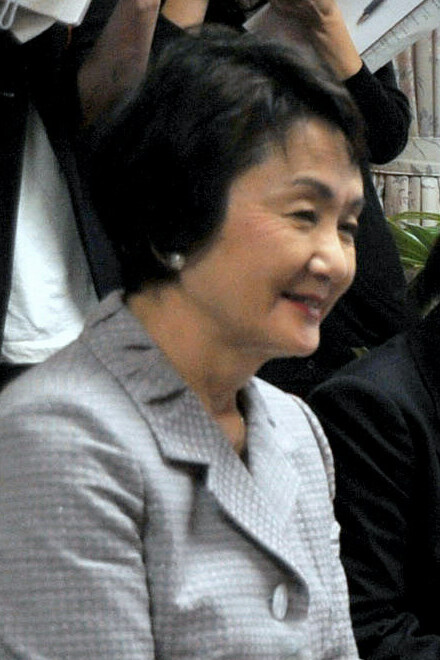
- Hayashi in 2011

Mayor of Yokohama
- In office 30 August 2009 – 30 August 2021
- Preceded by: Hiroshi Nakada
- Succeeded by: Takeharu Yamanaka

Personal details
- Born: Fumiko Hayashi; May 5, 1946 (age 80) Tokyo, Japan
- Party: Democratic Party for the People
- Occupation: Businesswoman and politician

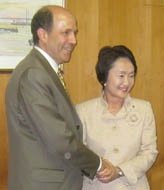
Hayashi meeting former United States Ambassador to Japan John Roos, September 8, 2009

Fumiko Hayashi (林 文子, Hayashi Fumiko; born May 5, 1946) is a Japanese politician and the former mayor of Yokohama, the capital of Kanagawa Prefecture in Japan. She is the first female mayor of the city. Her previous roles have included president of BMW Tokyo, president of Tokyo Nissan Auto Sales, and chairperson and CEO of the Japanese supermarket chain Daiei. On taking the chief executive role at Daiei, all of whose executives are men, Hayashi told the Nikkei Weekly: "I thought I would be able to create an example of a success in male-female collaboration."

In 2006, Forbes named her the 39th most powerful woman in the world, the highest rank for a Japanese woman. She was elected as mayor of Yokohama in 2009 following the sudden resignation of the former mayor, Hiroshi Nakada, until her defeat at the 2021 Yokohama mayoral election. In July 2022, she was awarded as Honorary Member of the Order of the British Empire (MBE), for services to the British Olympic and Paralympic Teams.

== Private sector career ==
Hayashi entered the workforce upon graduating from Tokyo Metropolitan Aoyama High School in 1965, working at Toyo Rayon (now Toray Industries) a Japanese textile company. She became a salesperson with Honda in 1977, when she was 31. It was rare for a woman in Japan to work for a carmaker, particularly in a sales role. However, in her first year, she was the top-performing salesperson. After ten years at Honda, Hayashi sought a role with BMW Tokyo. Although initially turned down by the company she persisted, writing a seven-page letter to BMW Tokyo, explaining why she should be hired. In 1987, five months after her first approach, the company hired her. Within a month of joining BMW she was the top salesperson in Shinjuku, BMW Tokyo's key showroom. The company later asked her to run the company's weakest Tokyo showroom. She was subsequently headhunted by Fahren Tokyo, which became Volkswagen, to run its flagship dealership in Tokyo. The dealership's annual sales more than doubled during her four-year tenure. By 1999 Fumiko Hayashi had been appointed president of the company. In 2003 Hayashi returned to BMW Tokyo as president.

Two years later Hayashi moved from the car industry to retail, becoming chairperson and CEO of The Daiei, Inc., a large Japanese retailer. Her next career move saw her return to the automotive sector as operating officer of Nissan, followed by her appointment as president of Tokyo Nissan Auto Sales in June 2008.

== Political career ==
Hayashi was elected as the 30th mayor (the 20th individual) of Yokohama on August 30, 2009, following the sudden resignation of former mayor Hiroshi Nakada. She received 910,297 votes, about 35,000 more than that of the second candidate. She was reelected on August 25, 2013, defeating two other candidates recommended by the Japanese Communist Party with 29.28% percent of the vote.

== Other offices held ==
Hayashi has also served as the member of the Council for Gender Equality of the Cabinet Office of Japan and ad hoc member of the 30th Local Government System Research Council.

She currently serves as the president, Mayors Association of Designated Cities, member of the Cultural Policy Committee, Council for Cultural Affairs, Agency for Cultural Affairs of Japan and affiliate professor, Tokyo Jogakkan College.

== Working as a woman in Japan ==
Hayashi described the biggest obstacle in her career as "the 'no precedent' factor".

Hayashi has been selected for many awards and honors in both Japan and abroad. In 2006, Forbes named Hayashi the 39th most powerful woman in the world, the highest rank for a Japanese woman. In the same year, she was selected as 1st Place in the Career Create category in Nikkei Woman Magazine's "Women of the Year 2006". In 2008, Fortune named Hayashi "50 Most Powerful Women in Business: International"

== Future development of Asian cities ==
In November 2012, Yokohama hosted the Smart City Week, a conference to discuss energy-efficiency in Asian cities and attended by representatives from ten major Japanese and other Asian cities. At the conference Hayashi said: "Many Asian cities are beset by problems arising from rapid urbanization and population growth." "We want to strengthen mutual ties by sharing knowhow needed to ensure sustainable development."

She has been promoting the name of Yokohama and comments that "Every officer should act as a billboard to send information; I myself am the top salesperson of Yokohama".

Emphasis on the cultural aspects has been placed in Yokohama during her term to promote the name of Yokohama. During the 2.5 months of the Dance Dance Dance @ Yokohama 2012, 1.25 million people visited Yokohama, in which dance events of every genre were conducted.

Political offices
| Preceded by Hiroshi Nakada | Mayor of Yokohama; 2009–2021 | Succeeded by Takeharu Yamanaka |
