= Kan'ichi Kanegae =

Japanese politician (1931–2025)

Kan'ichi Kanegae (Japanese: 鐘ヶ江管一; 22 January 1931 – 22 August 2025) was a Japanese politician.

== Life and career ==
Kanegae was born in Shimabara City, Nagasaki Prefecture on 22 January 1931.

In December 1980, he was elected mayor of Shimabara, serving for three terms and 12 years until December 1992. In 1991, with the eruption of Mount Unzen, he helped with disaster relief activities. His appearance was widely covered by the media and he became known as the "bearded mayor". His beard was shaved off in December 1992, immediately following his retirement.

In 2021, he won the Shimabara Peninsula Culture Award.

Kanegae died on 22 August 2025, at the age of 94.
