= Akira Ogawa =

Japanese politician

- 小川 晶
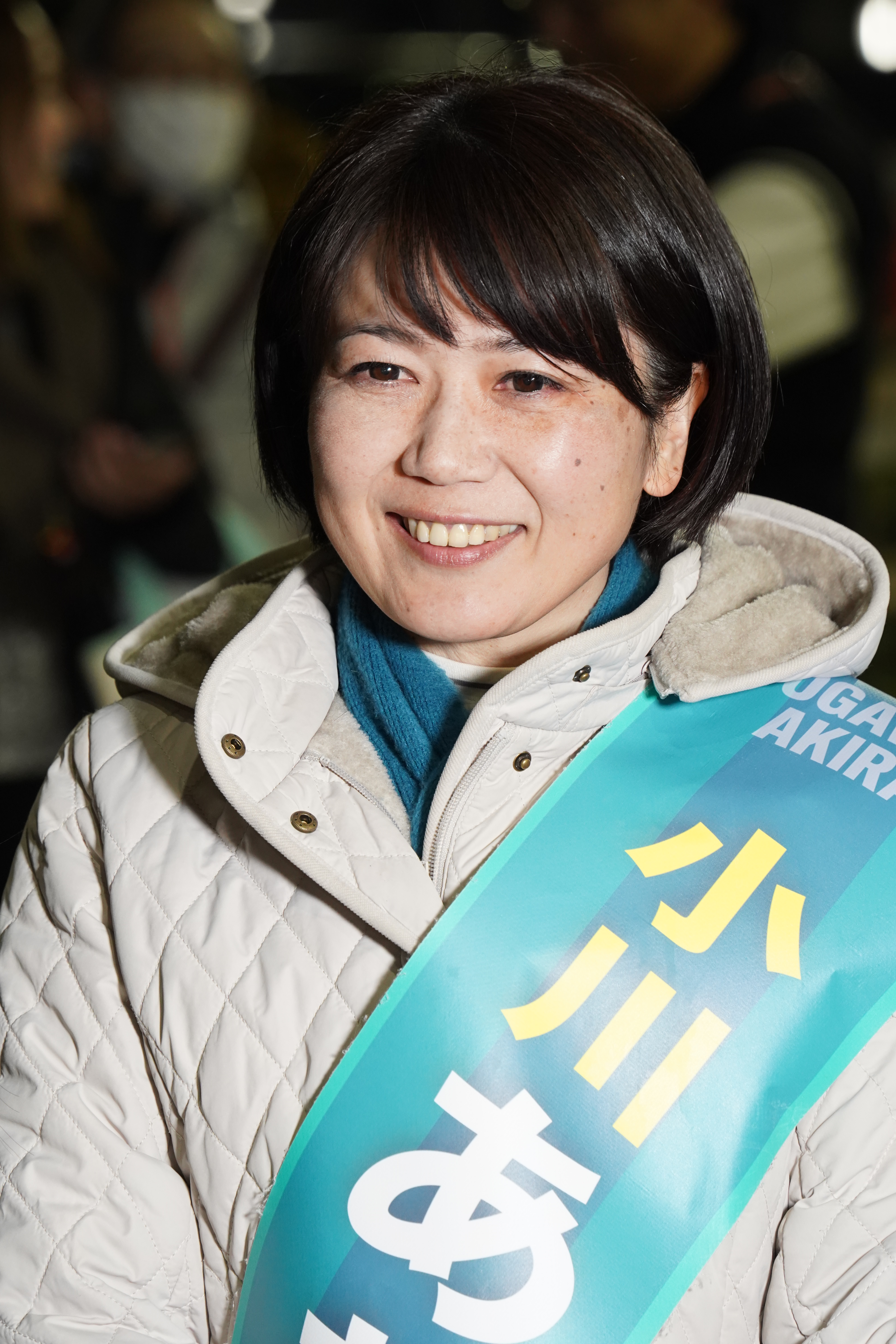
- Ogawa in 2026

Mayor of Maebashi
- Incumbent
- Assumed office 14 January 2026
- Preceded by: Herself
- In office 28 February 2024 – 27 November 2025
- Preceded by: Ryū Yamamoto
- Succeeded by: Herself

Member of the Gunma Prefectural Assembly
- In office 2011–2024
- Constituency: Maebashi City

Personal details
- Born: 21 December 1982 Sōsa, Chiba, Japan
- Party: Independent
- Other political affiliations: DPJ (2011–2016); DP (2016–2018)
- Education: Chuo University

Akira Ogawa (小川晶, Ogawa Akira; born 21 December 1982) is a Japanese politician serving as the mayor of Maebashi since January 2026.

== Biography ==
Akira Ogawa was born on 21 December 1982 in Sōsa, Chiba Prefecture, Japan. In March 2001 she graduated from Seishin Gakuen High School(ja) in Ibaraki Prefecture. She graduated from Chuo University in 2006. From April 2006 to August 2007, she has been working in Maebashi district court. After that, she decided to pursue a political career after facing ignorance from official mental health institutions when her clients tried to get help there.

On 10 April 2011, Akira Ogawa won her first election to the Gunma Prefecture Assembly. After that, on 28 November 2023, Ogawa announced her intention to run for mayor of Maebashi, where her only opponent was the incumbent mayor, Ryu Yamamoto. On 4 February 2024, she won the election and became the first female mayor on the post and the second woman to hold a mayoral office in Gunma Prefecture.

However, on 24 September 2025, News Post Sever published their investigation into Ogawa's connections with her married colleague. They used an official car to visit a love hotel multiple times. After that, on 25 November, Ogawa decided to resign. On 27 November, the city council accepted the resignation. She decided to run again in the next mayoral election and won on 12 January 2026.
