= Akira Otani =

Japanese fiction writer

Akira Otani 王谷 晶
- Born: 1981; 45 years ago Tokyo, Japan
- Occupation: Writer
- Writing career
- Genres: short story; novel; essay
- Subject: Gender
- Notable works: Kampeki janai, atashitachi; Baba Yaga no yoru

Akira Otani (王谷 晶, Ōtani Akira; born 1981) is a Japanese fiction writer born in Tokyo.

== Career ==
Known for a sharp, economical style, her work often subverts genres like mystery and noir and focuses on characters that exist outside the gender archetypes of Japanese fiction, which she has described as "stiff and lacking reality." Her novel Baba Yaga no yoru (The Night of Baba Yaga), a yakuza thriller concerned with sisterhood, has been compared to Thelma and Louise and was shortlisted for the Mystery Writers of Japan Award. Otani is lesbian. In December 2021, Big Comic Spirits published a short manga entitled "The tale of Sattun, who has become a fish (サカナになった さっつんの話, Sakana ni natta Satsun no hanashi)," for which Otani wrote the text and artist Ayumu Hida (肥田アユム) did the drawings.

== Awards ==
In 2025, Otani became the first person from Japan to win in the UK-based Dagger Awards for her novel "The Night of Baba Yaga", which won the best translated crime novel category.

== Selected works ==
=== Story collections ===
- 完璧じゃない、あたしたち (Kampeki janai, atashitachi) with stories by Akira Ōtani (Poplar Publishing, #O-17-1, Popurasha Bunko series, 2019. 978-4-591-16494-5 - 23 short stories
- 怪談 奇談 (Kaidan, Kidan) stories adapted from Lafcadio Hearn, revised by Akira Ōtani (Sayūsha, Bī-eru koten serekushon series No.3, 2019) 978-4-86528-240-5. - Boys' love
- 君の六月は凍る（Kimi no rokugatsu wa kōru） (Asahi Shimbun Publications, 2023) 978-4-02-251908-5 - includes ベイビー、イッツ・お東京さま (beibī issu o-Tōkyō-sama), a half-self biography

=== Novels ===
- Edited by Office Six (2012) : 猛獣使いと王子様 : 金色の笛と緑の炎 (Mōjūtsukai to ōjisama - Kin'iro no fue to midori no honō) (Hifumishobo, 978-4-89199-081-7).
- あやかしリストランテ : 奇妙な客人のためのアラカルト (2015) (Ayakashi risutorante - Kimyō na kyakujin no tame no arakaruto ) (Shueisha, Orange Bunko series, 978-4-08-680018-1.)
    - 時を超えたハンバーグ (Toki wo koeta hanbāgu)
    - 乙女の冒険フルコース (Otome no bōken furu kōsu)
    - 恋の狩人のためのタルト(koi no karyūdo not tame no arakaruto)
- 探偵小説（ミステリー）には向かない探偵 (2016) (Tantei shōsetsu (misuterī) ni wa mukanai tantei) (Shueisha, #O:1-2, Orange Bunko series, 978-4-08-680077-8. )
- ババヤガの夜 (2020) (Baba Yaga no yoru) (Kawade Shobō Shinsha)
  - Translated into English: The Night of Baba Yaga. Translated by Sam Bett. New York: Soho Crime Press. 2024. ISBN 978-1641294911..

=== Essays ===
- どうせカラダが目当てでしょ (2019) (Dōse karada ga me-ate deshō) (Kawade Shobō Shinsha, 978-4-309-02794-4.)
- 40歳だけど大人になりたい (2023） (Yonjussai dakedo otona ni naritai) （Heibonsha, 978-4-582-83918-0.)

=== Manga ===
Novela adopted to:

- Otani, Akira (6 December 2021). "サカナになったさっつんの話" [Sakana ni natta Satsun no hanashi]. Shūkan Big Comic Spirits (in Japanese) (1). Hida Ayumu (drawings) (weekly ed.). Shogakukan – via National Diet Library, Tokyo.
