= Tōru Rokkawa =

Japanese sports journalist (1957–2025)

Rokkawa Tōru
- 六川 亨(ろっかわ とおる)
- Born: September 25, 1957; Itabashi, Tokyo, Japan
- Died: November 17, 2025 (aged 68)
- Citizenship: Japan
- Occupation: Soccer journalist
- Years active: 1981–2025
- Known for: Soccer Digest editor-in-chief

Tōru Rokkawa (Japanese: 六川亨, Hepburn: Rokkawa Tōru; September 25, 1957 – November 17, 2025) was a Japanese soccer journalist and the editor-in-chief of the Japanese soccer magazine Soccer Digest.

== Life and career ==
Rokkawa was born in Itabashi, Tokyo on September 25, 1957. After graduating from Hosei University, he joined Japan Sports Planning Publishing Co., Ltd. Since 1988, he served as the editor-in-chief of "Soccer Digest", and in 1993, he took the lead in making it a weekly magazine with the launch of the J-League.

In 2001, he joined FromOne. In 2010, he left and became an independent journalist.

In July 2022, he was diagnosed with stage III lung cancer during treatment for pneumonia. He continued his reporting activities and continued treatment, but died on November 17, 2025, at the age of 68.
