= Kōichi Sueyoshi =

Japanese politician (1934–2025)

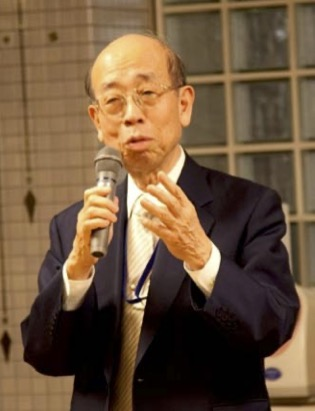
Sueyoshi in 2009

Kōichi Sueyoshi (Japanese:末吉興一; September 20, 1934 – 14 December 2025) was a Japanese politician.

== Life and career ==
Sueyoshi was born in Hyogo on September 20, 1934. From 1960, he served as the head of the site section at the Ministry of Construction Matsubara-Shimotsuki Dam Construction Office.

After serving as the Director of the Land Bureau of the National Land Agency, he served as the mayor of Kitakyushu for five terms and a period of 20 years from 1987 to 2007. After retiring as mayor, he served as a member of the Ministry of Foreign Affairs, the Cabinet Secretariat, and the Ministry of Finance.

Sueyoshi died on 14 December 2025, at the age of 91.
