= Takeharu Yamanaka =

Japanese politician

- 山中 竹春
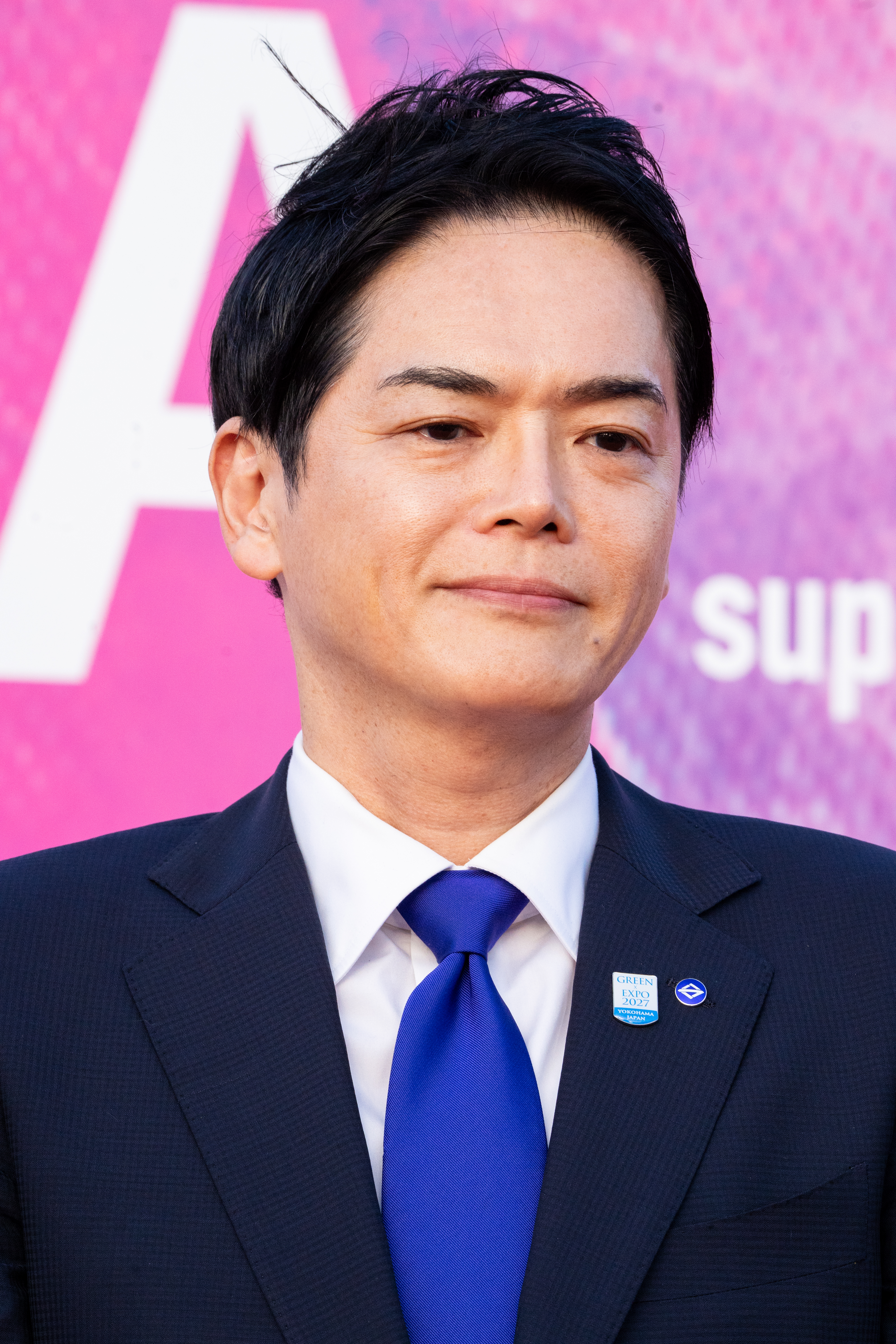
- Yamanaka in 2024

Mayor of Yokohama
- Incumbent
- Assumed office 30 August 2021
- Preceded by: Fumiko Hayashi

Personal details
- Born: 27 September 1972 (age 54) Chichibu, Saitama, Japan
- Party: Independent
- Education: Waseda University (Ph.D.)
- Occupation: Data scientist, Professor at Yokohama City University School of Medicine
- Website: Takeharu Yamanaka OFFICIAL WEB SITE

Takeharu Yamanaka (山中 竹春, Yamanaka Takeharu; born 27 September 1972) is a Japanese politician and current mayor of Yokohama, the capital of Kanagawa Prefecture. He defeated incumbent mayor Fumiko Hayashi in the 2021 Yokohama mayoral election. His independent campaign was supported by the Constitutional Democratic Party, Social Democratic Party, and the Communist Party of Japan. Yamanaka's campaign focused on the opposition for a planned integrated resort development and casino for the city which was to be built on Yamashita Pier, criticism against the government's response to the COVID-19 pandemic, and additional sister city relationship with San Francisco, California.

Yamanaka formerly worked as a professor at Yokohama City University and as a data scientist.

On 16 January 2026, Yamanaka issued a public apology after Yokohama's human resource chief, Jun Kubota, accused Yamanaka of using terms such as "idiot" and "human scum" to disparage staff. In July 2026, a third-party investigation confirmed these allegations and also Yamanaka saying things like "everyone over 55 is stubborn and useless", even telling an official to "disembowel" if he failed to secure a bid to host an international conference. On 28 August 2026, two weeks after some of Japan's major political parties urged him to step down from his post, Yamanaka announced his intention to resign as the mayor of Yokohama. He ran again for mayor in elections held on 18 October, but lost to Atsumi Harasawa.

Political offices
Preceded by Fumiko Hayashi	Mayor of Yokohama; 2021–present	Incumbent
