= 2026 in Japan =

- Decades: 2000s; 2010s; 2020s; 2030s
- See also: Other events of 2026: History of Japan; Timeline; Years

Events in the year 2026 in Japan.

== Incumbents ==
- Emperor: Naruhito
- Prime Minister: Sanae Takaichi (Liberal Democratic)
- Chief Cabinet Secretary: Minoru Kihara (Liberal Democratic)
- Chief Justice: Yukihiko Imasaki
- Speaker of the House of Representatives: Fukushiro Nukaga (Liberal Democratic)
- President of the House of Councillors: Masakazu Sekiguchi (Liberal Democratic)

== Events ==
=== January ===
- January 1 – Hachijuni Bank and Nagano Bank merge to form Hachijuni Nagano Bank.
- January 4 – A collision caused by tea leaves spilled from a moving truck involving 12 vehicles in Sano, Tochigi, leaves one person dead and three others injured.
- January 5 – A 243 kg (536 lb) bluefin tuna is sold for a record ¥510 million (US$3.2 million) at the Toyosu Market in Tokyo.
- January 6 –
  - A magnitude 6.4 earthquake hits Tottori and Shimane Prefectures, injuring seven people.
  - China bans the export of dual-use items, with military applications, to Japan, citing contentious statements made by the Japanese government regarding tensions with Taiwan.
- January 8 – A wildfire breaks out in the mountains of Ōtsuki and Uenohara, Yamanashi, burning at least 16 hectares (40 acres) of forest.
- January 12 – Former mayor Akira Ogawa is re-elected as the mayor of Maebashi in a special election following her resignation in November 2025.
- January 14 –
  - The Nikkei 225 sets an all-time high closing at 54,341 points.
  - An ACSL SOTEN recon unmanned aerial vehicle of the Japan Ground Self-Defense Force goes missing during a training flight in Kirishima, Kagoshima Prefecture.
- January 15 –
  - Constitutional Democratic Party of Japan leader Yoshihiko Noda and Komeito leader Tetsuo Saito agree to form a new political party.
  - Japan and the Philippines sign an agreement allowing their defense forces to exchange logistical support.
- January 16 –
  - A power outage in Tokyo causes an eight-hour delay in train services, resulting in five people being hospitalized.
  - The mayor of Yokohama, Takeharu Yamanaka, issues a public apology after a city official accuses him of making disparaging remarks on staff.
- January 17 – The 2026 Common Test for University Admissions is held across Japan.
- January 20 – A sightseeing helicopter carrying three people, including two Taiwanese nationals, goes missing near Mount Aso.
- January 21 –
  - Tetsuya Yamagami is sentenced to life imprisonment for the assassination of Shinzo Abe in 2022.
  - The No. 6 reactor at the Kashiwazaki-Kariwa Nuclear Power Plant is reactivated for the first time since 2011.
- January 22 – Hirofumi Yoshimura resigns as governor of Osaka Prefecture.
- January 23 – Prime Minister Sanae Takaichi dissolves the House of Representatives at the start of the regular Diet session.
- January 25 – Takato Ishida wins the 2026 Fukui gubernatorial election.
- January 26 – The Tokyo District Court orders North Korea to pay ¥88 million (US$555,850.32) in compensation to four Zainichi Koreans who were lured to move to the country through propaganda schemes but instead experienced inappropriate conditions before escaping.
- January 27 – Xiao Xiao and Lei Lei, the last giant pandas in Japan sent there as part of China's Panda diplomacy, leave the Ueno Zoo.
- January 29 – Three suitcases containing 420 million yen (US$2.7 million) in cash are stolen in a robbery near Ueno Station in Tokyo.

=== February ===
- February 2 – Japan announces the retrieval of sediment containing rare earth minerals at a depth of 6,000 m (20,000 ft) below sea level off the coast of Minamitorishima.
- February 3 – Kindai University announces that blackthroat seaperch has been successfully cultivated for the first time.
- February 8 –
  - 2026 Japanese general election: The LDP becomes the first party in postwar Japan to win a two-thirds majority in the House of Representatives, winning 316 out of 465 seats.
  - 2026 Yamaguchi gubernatorial election: Incumbent Tsugumasa Muraoka is reelected for a fourth term.
  - 2026 Nagasaki gubernatorial election: Ken Hirata defeats the incumbent Kengo Oishi
  - 2026 Osaka gubernatorial election: Hirofumi Yoshimura (One Osaka) is reelected as governor.
  - 2026 Osaka mayoral election: Hideyuki Yokoyama (One Osaka) is reelected as mayor.
- February 12 – The Fisheries Agency seizes a Chinese fishing boat and its 11 crew inside the Exclusive economic zone of Japan off the coast of Nagasaki Prefecture.
- February 13 –
  - Junya Ogawa is elected as the new leader for the Centrist Reform Alliance.
  - One person is killed in a controlled fire at the Akiyoshidai Quasi-National Park in Yamaguchi Prefecture.
- February 14 – One person is killed while two others are injured in a knife attack in Dōtonbori, Osaka.
- February 18 – Sanae Takaichi is formally reappointed for a new term as prime minister.
- February 20 –
  - Five people are killed in a fire at a Buddhist temple in Shimonoseki.
  - A fishing boat sinks after being struck by a cargo vessel off the coast of Mie Prefecture, killing two people and injuring 10 others.
- February 24 – China imposes export restrictions on 40 Japanese entities accused of contributing to Japanese "remilitarization" efforts.

=== March ===
- March 4 –
  - Purported yakuza leader Takeshi Ebisawa is convicted and sentenced by a U.S. court to 20 years in prison for trafficking nuclear material, drugs, and weapons.
  - The Tokyo High Court upholds an order to dissolve the Unification Church.
- March 5 – Kushiro wetlands megasolar issue: Hokkaido Prefectural Government release a report that arsenic, fluorine, boron level outside the Kushiro-shitsugen National Park exceed the standard limit.
- March 6 –
  - The health ministry approves the sale of Amchepry, a stem cell medication for Parkinson's disease developed by Sumitomo Pharma, and ReHeart, a heart muscle sheets medication for circulatory issues by Cuorips.
  - Japan and Canada sign a strategic agreement to enhance cooperation in the defense, economy and energy sectors.
  - The Ministry of Agriculture, Forestry and Fisheries confirms an outbreak of avian influenza of the H5N1 strain outbreak at a poultry farm in Abira, Hokkaido.
- March 8 – The 2026 Ishikawa gubernatorial election is held.
- March 15 – Japan announces it will start releasing 80 million barrels of oil from its reserves, the largest such release in the country's history, in response to disruptions in the oil supply caused by the 2026 Iran war.
- March 16 – Two boats carrying high school students on a field trip capsize off Henoko, Okinawa Prefecture, killing two people.
- March 20 –
  - Six people are killed in a traffic accident along the Shin-Meishin Tunnel in Kameyama, Mie.
  - Prime Minister Sanae Takaichi holds a meeting with U.S. President Donald Trump in Washington D.C.
- March 23 – 2026 Social Democratic Party (Japan) leadership election (first round): Current chairwoman Mizuho Fukushima and former vice chairwoman Yūko Ōtsubaki advance to a run-off vote.
- March 25 –
  - A Japan Self-Defence Forces soldier is arrested for suspicion of breaking into the Chinese Embassy in Tokyo with a knife.
  - Around 24,000 people participate in a protest outside the National Diet in opposition of the constitutional revision of Article 9 and the 2026 Iran war.
- March 26 – A 21-year old worker at the Pokémon Center in Ikebukuro, Tokyo, is fatally stabbed in a murder-suicide incident believed to have been carried out by an ex-boyfriend of the victim.
- March 28 – A protest against the 2026 Iran war is organized by the civil group Peace for Palestine! Emergency Action, which was attended by 700 people.
- March 30 – NHK Radio 2 ceases broadcasting after 95 years of airing.
- March 31 – French President Emmanuel Macron visits Japan.

=== April ===
- April 1 –
  - A magnitude 5.0 earthquake hits southern Tochigi Prefecture.
  - JR Hokkaido’s Rumoi Main Line closes after 115 years in operation.
- April 3 –
  - A liquefied natural gas (LNG) oil tanker registered in Japan crosses the Strait of Hormuz for the first since the outbreak of the 2026 Iran war.
  - A 50-year-old man is arrested after pouring and lighting a gasoline can in the middle of the Shibuya Crossing in Tokyo.
- April 5 – 2026 Kyoto gubernatorial election is held.
- April 6 –
  - 2026 Social Democratic Party (Japan) leadership election: Run-off vote is held.
  - Emperor Naruhito, Empress Masako and Princess Aiko visit Fukushima Prefecture to commemorate the 15th anniversary of the 2011 Tōhoku earthquake and tsunami and Fukushima Daichii nuclear accident.
- April 8 – Thirty thousand people participate in an anti-war and anti-constitutional amendment protest in front of the National Diet Building in Chiyoda-ku, Tokyo. Similar protests are also held in 150 other places across Japan.
- April 12 – The Liberal Democratic Party holds a party conference.
- April 13 – The body of Yuki Adachi is found in Nantan, Kyoto, following a three-week search.
- April 16 – A forest fire breaks out in Nemuro, Hokkaido burning 328 hectares (810 acres) of grassland.
- April 18 – A magnitude 5.0 earthquake hits Nagano Prefecture, injuring one person in Iiyama.
- April 20 – A magnitude 7.7 earthquake hits off the Sanriku Coast, triggering up to 80-centimeter (31 in) tsunamis and injuring six people.
- April 21 –
  - An artillery shell explodes inside a tank at a JGSDF training ground in Ōita Prefecture, killing three soldiers and injuring one.
  - The Japanese government lifts the ban on arms exports for weapons with lethal capabilities.
- April 22 – A wildfire breaks out in Otsuchi, Iwate burning at least 200 hectares (490 acres) of forest.
- April 23 – The Nikkei 225 reaches 60,000 points for the first time.
- April 27 – A magnitude 6.1 earthquake strikes Urahoro, Hokkaido, injuring one person.
- April 29 – Five cars and two bicycles are involved in an accident in Itabashi-ku, Tokyo, injuring six people.

=== May ===
- May 2 – The 2026 Ōtsuchi wildfires is declared to have been "under control".
- May 6 – A minibus carrying 20 students collides with a guard rail in Ban-etsu Expressway in Koriyama, Fukushima injuring 17 people and killing one.
- May 8 – Mount Minamidake in Sakurajima, Kagoshima erupts, creating a 3,500-meter (11,500 ft) high smoke above the crater.
- May 11–21 – Japan hosts the Antarctic Treaty Consultative Meeting and the 28th Meeting of the Committee for Environmental Protection in Hiroshima.
- May 14 – A ship dismantling plant in Kure, Hiroshima catches fire, resulting in the evacuation of 650 people.
- May 15 – A magnitude 6.3 earthquake strikes off the coast of Miyagi Prefecture.
- May 16 – A fire breaks out in the 500-year-old Daihō-ji Temple in Takaoka, Toyama.
- May 20 –
  - The 1,200-year-old Sacred Fire Hall of Daishō-in Temple in Itsukushima, Hiroshima Prefecture is completely burned down.
  - A magnitude 5.9 earthquake strikes southern Amami, Kagoshima.
- May 25 – Twenty-five people are injured after a man sprays an unknown substance at Ginza Six in Ginza, Tokyo.
- May 26 – Philippine President Bongbong Marcos arrives at Haneda Airport for a four-day state visit.
- May 29 – The 2026 Ōtsuchi wildfires is declared to be extinguished and is also designated as a "major disaster" by the government.
- May 31 – 2026 Niigata gubernatorial election is held.

=== June ===
- June 1 –
  - US President Donald Trump deploys the Navy-Marine Expeditionary Ship Interdiction System and Marine Air Defence Integrated System in the southern Japanese islands as part of the US military's regional war plan to defend Taiwan and deter a future Chinese invasion.
  - Nine people are injured in Naha due to Severe Tropical Storm Jangmi, while 82,921 others are evacuated across five municipalities in Okinawa Prefecture, with 27 municipalities without power.
- June 2 — Four people are injured in a bear attack in Fukushima.
- June 16 — A magnitude 5.5 earthquake hits Chiba Prefecture, injuring two people.
- June 19 — Eleven people are injured in a fire at an elementary school in Tokyo.
- June 23 – At least 15 buildings are burned after a fire breaks out in a shopping arcade in Izumo, Shimane.
- June 25 — A magnitude 6.9 earthquake hits off Iwate Prefecture, injuring five people.
- June 26 – 2026 Pacific typhoon season: Typhoon Mekkhala and Tropical Storm Higos result in 354.5 centimetres (139.6 in) of 72-hour precipitation on Hofu, Yamaguchi, the highest on record. A landslide also occurs on Hirao, Yamaguchi.
- June 27 – A magnitude 5.6 earthquake strikes Yamanashi Prefecture, injuring 10 people.

=== July ===
- July 5 – The 2026 Shiga gubernatorial election is held.
- July 8 – A house and a road is destroyed following a landslide in Koka, Shiga.
- July 9 – Tarō Yamamoto resigned as the leader of Reiwa Shinsengumi.
- July 10 – Japanese imperial succession debate: The House of Representatives passes the "Imperial Family Code" bill seeking to amend the rights of succession of the Japanese imperial family. Following the passing of the bill, various protests are held by 27,000 people across 136 places in Japan including in front of the National Diet.
- July 13 – The government approves the establishment of a new intelligence agency, the National Intelligence Bureau, for the first time since World War II.
- July 14 – Kushiro wetlands megasolar issue: the Hokkaido prefectural government designated the megasolar construction site around Kushiro-shitsugen National Park to be a Contaminated Soil Zone.
- July 17 –
  - Twenty-three people, including 18 students, are hospitalized following a spraying incident in Municipal Third Middle High School in Kaizuka, Osaka Prefecture.
  - Japanese imperial succession debate: The House of Councillors passes the "Imperial Family Code" bill.
- July 20 – A fire breaks out in Camp Asaka.
- July 24 – The United States imposes a 12.5% tariff on Japan, citing the presence of alleged forced labour in the supply chain.
- July 26 – The ancient capital of Asuka-Fujiwara is designated as a UNESCO World Heritage Site.
- July 28 – A magnitude 7.1 earthquake hits Kumamoto Prefecture, killing 39 people.
- July 31 – The 2026 Reiwa Shinsengumi leadership election is held.

=== August ===
- August 3 – Twelve people are injured in an apartment fire in Koganei, Tokyo.
- August 4 – A knife-wielding man is shot dead by police in Kawachinagano, Osaka Prefecture.
- August 9 – 2026 Nagano gubernatorial election is held.
- August 11 – Severe Tropical Storm Chan-hom (Typhoon No. 15) makes landfall on Ibaraki Prefecture, the first time since records began in 1951. Two people are injured.
- August 13 –
  - Thirteen people are killed following record-breaking heavy rainfall and flooding in Chiba Prefecture.
  - A law penalizing the desecration of the Japanese flag comes into effect.
- August 18 – The United States imposes sanctions on Japanese jurist Tomoko Akane, citing her position as president of the International Criminal Court.
- August 20 – Four railway workers at the Tōbu Nikkō Line die after being struck by a limited express train in Shin-Kanuma Station in Kanuma, Tochigi.
- August 21 – Sunao Takami, who killed five people in a 2009 arson attack at a pachinko shop in Konohana-ku, Osaka, becomes the first person to be executed under the Takaichi administration.
- August 23 – A magnitude 5.9 earthquake strikes southern Ibaraki Prefecture injuring 45 people.
- August 24 – A leisure boat collides with a seawall near Haneda Airport, injuring nine people.
- August 25 –
  - Typhoon Saudel (Typhoon No. 18) hits Okinawa Prefecture, injuring three people.
  - Four luxury watches valued at 200 million yen ($1.2 million) are stolen from a watch store in Nakano, Tokyo.
- August 28 –
  - Takeharu Yamanaka resigns as mayor of Yokohama after he admits to subjecting city employees to bullying and verbal abuse.
  - Three middle schoolers are washed away offshore and are missing in Ichikikushikino, Kagoshima Prefecture.
- August 30 – 2026 Kagawa gubernatorial election is held.
- August 31 – A fire breaks out in a shopping arcade in Ise, Mie Prefecture.

=== September ===
- September 1 – The nationwide speed limit in residential roads is lowered from 60 km/h (37 mph) to 30 km/h (19 mph).
- September 3 –
  - A fishing boat sinks in Nichinan, Miyazaki Prefecture, killing three people.
  - Japanese researcher Tokuji Unno wins the Ig Nobel Prize for his 1977 paper “How to Blow the Nose — An Aerodynamic Study of the Nose Blowing.”
- September 5 – A suspected arson of a cake shop in Motosu, Gifu Prefecture kills three people and injures two.
- September 6 – 2026 Democratic Party for the People leadership election: Yuichiro Tamaki is elected to a third term as party leader with 79% of the vote against Mikihiko Hashimoto.
- September 9 – Flooding and landslides caused by heavy rains leave one person dead in Kawanehon, Shizuoka prefecture, and 41 others injured in Nagoya.
- September 13 – 2026 Okinawa gubernatorial election: Incumbent governor Denny Tamaki loses reelection to LDP-backed candidate Genta Koja.
- September 15 – A Northrop Grumman RQ-4 Global Hawk of the Japan Air Self-Defense Force crashes into the Sea of Japan off Tottori Prefecture.
- September 16 –
  - Twenty-four students are injured following a tear gas spraying incident at Osaka University of Commerce - Sakai High School in Naka-ku, Sakai, Osaka Prefecture.
  - A bus and truck collide in Nada-ku, Kobe, Hyogo Prefecture, injuring at least 10 people.
- September 17 – Prime Minister Takaichi conducts a cabinet reshuffle.
- September 21 – Four people are killed while six others are reported missing in Chiba and Kanagawa Prefectures following incidents caused by Typhoon Dujuan.

=== October ===
- October 1 – The government raises the permanent foreign residency fee to 200,000 yen ($1,270) and introduces new requirements for the status.
- October 3 – A member of the US Marine Corps is arrested on suspicion of murdering a woman in Naha, Okinawa Prefecture.
- October 18 – 2026 Yokohama mayoral election: Atsumi Harasawa is elected mayor.
- October 25 – 2026 Fukushima gubernatorial election is held.

=== November ===
- November 8 – A magnitude 5.7 earthquake hits Shizuoka Prefecture, injuring 20 people.
- November 15 –
  - 2026 Ehime gubernatorial election is held.
  - 2026 Fukuoka mayoral election is held.
- November 17 – Two suspected Russian aircraft briefly enter Japanese airspace off Okinoshima, forcing the JSDF to scramble fighter jets.
- 18 November – A magnitude 5.3 earthquake hits Kumamoto Prefecture, injuring two people.

=== Predicted and scheduled events ===
- November 30 – The Sankei Shimbun will suspend publication in six prefectures in the Tōhoku region.
- Autumn – The restoration of Shuri Castle in Naha, Okinawa is scheduled to be fully completed.
- December 20 – 2026 Saga gubernatorial election is scheduled to be held.
- December 27 – 2026 Miyazaki gubernatorial election is scheduled to be held.
- Within the fiscal year – The Tokyo Metropolitan Government will start supplying 200 affordable housing units per year.

== Ongoing ==
- China–Japan diplomatic crisis (since November 2025)

== Elections ==
- 2026 Japanese general election
- 2026 Japanese local elections
- 2026 Osaka gubernatorial election
- 2026 Ishikawa gubernatorial election
- 2026 Osaka mayoral election

== Arts and entertainment ==
- 2026 in anime
- 2026 in Japanese music
- 2026 in Japanese television
- List of 2026 box office number-one films in Japan
- List of Japanese films of 2026
- 39th Tokyo International Film Festival

== Sports ==
- Japan at the 2026 Winter Olympics (February 6 to 22, 2026)
- September 19 – October 4 – The 2026 Asian Games are held in Aichi Prefecture, including Nagoya.
- October 18–24 – The 2026 Asian Para Games are held in Aichi Prefecture, including Nagoya.
- March 29 – 2026 Japanese Grand Prix
- July 24 – August 2 – The 2026 World Lacrosse Women's Championship will be held in Tokyo.
- July 25–26 – 2026 Tokyo ePrix
- October 4 – 2026 Japanese motorcycle Grand Prix
- May 3 – 162th Tennō Shō (Spring)
- November 1 – 173rd Tennō Shō (Autumn)
- December 27 – 71st Arima Kinen
- 2026 F4 Japanese Championship
- 2026 Super Formula Championship
- 2026 Super Formula Lights
- 2026 Super GT Series
- 2026-27 in Japanese football
- 2026 J1 100 Year Vision League
- 2026-27 J1 League
- 2026-27 J2 League
- 2026-27 J3 League
- 2026-27 Japan Football League
- 2026-27 Japanese Regional Leagues
- 2026 Japanese Super Cup
- 2026-27 Emperor's Cup
- 2026-27 J.League Cup

== Deaths ==
=== January ===
- January 1 –
  - Yatsushi Iwashita, education support activist (b. 1949)
  - Hiroshi Kume, television and radio presenter (b. 1944)
- January 2 – Toshio Fujii, politician (b. 1942).
- January 5 – Aoi Fujino, gravure idol (b. 1998)
- January 7 – Hiroya Ebina, politician (b. 1959)
- January 8 – Hiroshi Nakamura, visual artist (b. 1932)
- January 9 – Ai, Western chimpanzee, subject of cognition studies
- January 10 – Ritsuko Nagao, politician (b. 1933)
- January 11 –
  - Takashi Ono, mathematician (b. 1928)
  - Kōtarō Kodama, politician (b. 1934)
- January 20 – Kōzō Shioya, voice actor (b. 1955)
- January 21 –
  - Daiwa Major, Thoroughbred racehorse (b. 2001)
  - Yōichi Higashi, film director (b. 1934)
- January 22 – Hifumi Katō, shogi player (b. 1940)
- January 29 – Sentoryū Henri, sumo wrestler (b. 1969)
- January 31 –
  - Kazuhiko Hasegawa, film director (b. 1946)
  - Masaru Ikeda, voice actor (b. 1942)

=== February ===
- February 1 – Nobuhiko Ochiai, journalist and novelist (b. 1942)
- February 4 – Tōsha Meishō, hayashi musician (b. 1941)
- February 8 –
  - Tadamasa Goto, yakuza leader (b. 1942)
  - Tadao Yasuda, sumo wrestler (b. 1963)
- February 10 –
  - Takamitsu Muraoka, linguist (b. 1938)
  - Shutaro Iida, 52, video game programmer (Castlevania: Aria of Sorrow, Castlevania: Portrait of Ruin) and director (Bloodstained: Ritual of the Night) (b. 1973)
- February 11 – Toshio Motoya, essayist, publisher, and businessman (b. 1943)
- February 17 – Shinya, musician (b. 1970)

=== March ===
- March 2 – Kohei Otsuka, politician (b. 1959)
- March 3 – Masako Ikeda, voice actress (b. 1939)
- March 5 –
  - Masaru Urata, member of the House of Councillors (1983–1989, 1992–1998) (b. 1925)
  - Yonehiko Kitagawa, voice actor (b. 1931)
- March 6 – Tsutomu Shibayama, anime director (b. 1941)
- March 10 – Fumiko Takeshita, novelist (b 1957).
- March 14 – Shigeaki Mori, historian and atomic bomb survivor (b. 1937)
- March 15 – Wakashimazu Mutsuo, sumo wrestler (b. 1957)
- March 18 – Heisuke Hironaka, mathematician (Hironaka's example, Hironaka decomposition), Fields Medal winner (1970) (b. 1931)
- March 23 – Yuki Adachi, student (b. c. 2016)
- March 26 – Mayumi Ogawa, actress (b. 1939)

=== April ===
- April 14 – Kazuo Ebisawa, art director (b. 1953)
- April 16 – Seigō Tsuchida, politician (b. 1943)
- April 18 – Wakana Yamazaki, voice actress (b. 1965)
- April 24 – Hirohiko Okano, poet (b. 1924)
- April 29 – Aiko Satō, writer (b. 1923)

=== May ===
- May 4 – Yuji Ohno, composer (b. 1941)
- May 8 – Koji Suzuki, writer (b. 1957)
- May 14 – Takahiro Fujiwara, voice actor (b. 1982)
- May 18 – Toshifumi Suzuki, convenience store executive, CEO of 7-Eleven (2005–2016) (b. 1932)
- May 23 – Tadateru Konoe, humanitarian, president of the International Federation of Red Cross and Red Crescent Societies (2009–2017) (b. 1939)
- May 31 – Hasegawa Katsutoshi, sumo wrestler (b. 1944)

=== June ===
- June 2 – Guts Ishimatsu, professional boxer (b. 1949)
- June 5 – Yoshihisa Uchida, 101, politician (b. 1925)
- June 8 – Yōhei Kōno, politician (b. 1937)
- June 9 – Tamao Nakamura, actress (b. 1939)
- June 15 – Toyoji Sudo, politician (b. 1959)
- June 20 – Akihiro Miwa, singer (b. 1935)

=== July ===
- July 3 – Yukiko Nikaido, voice actress (b. 1938)
- July 19 – Toshiaki Fushimi, cyclist (b. 1976)
- July 22 – Eiji Bandō, entertainer, baseball player (b. 1940)
- July 23 –
  - Keigo Higashino, author (b. 1958)
  - Kōzō Okamoto, communist militant and mass murderer (b. 1947).
- July 27 – Takeaki Matsumoto, politician (b. 1959)

=== August ===
- August 1 – Ryotaro Shimizu, actor (b. 1988)
- August 2 – Tsurumaru Tsuyoshi, Thoroughbred racehorse (b. 1995)
- August 7 –
  - Chikara Sakaguchi, politician (b. 1934)
  - Keiko Kishi, actress (b. 1932)
- August 8 – Hiroshi Okuda, businessman (b. 1932)
- August 13 – Yukio Shimomura, footballer (b. 1932)
- August 14 – Yayoi Kusama, contemporary artist (b. 1929)
- August 23 –
  - Nakayama Festa, Thoroughbred racehorse (b. 2006)
  - Bun'yō Ishikawa, photojournalist (b. 1938)
- August 24 –
  - Izuru Narushima, film director (b. 1961)
  - Hideki Shirakawa, chemist (b. 1936)
- August 26 – Toshio Masuda, film director (b. 1927)

=== September ===
- September 7 – Admire Moon, Thoroughbred racehorse (b. 2003)
- September 9 – Isao Harimoto, baseball player (b. 1940)
- September 17 – Kōichi Watanabe, politician (b. 1957)
- September 18 – Sō Kuramoto, screenwriter (b. 1935)

=== October ===
- October 6 – Kazuhiko Yamaguchi, film director (b. 1937)
- October 11 – Hiroshi Tsuchida, voice actor (b. 1972)
- October 17 – Ryū Murakami, novelist (b. 1952)
- October 22
  - Yasuo Fukuda, prime minister (2007–2008) (b. 1936)
  - Tetsuya Chiba, manga artist (b. 1939)

=== November ===
- November 7 – Ritsuko Nakayama, bowler and television personality (b. 1942)
- November 12 – Hiromi Ōta, singer (b. 1955)
- November 13 – Masaaki Yamazaki, politician (b. 1942)
- November 17 – Yutaka Enatsu, baseball player (b. 1948)

== See also ==
=== Country overviews ===
- Japan
- History of Japan
- Outline of Japan
- Government of Japan
- Politics of Japan
- Years in Japan
- Timeline of Japanese history

=== Related timelines for current period ===
- 2026
- 2020s
- 2020s in political history
