= 2026 in Japanese television =

Below is a non-comprehensive list of events associated with and affecting Japanese television in 2026.

== Events ==
Date	Event	Source
February 6 - February 22	The 2026 Winter Olympics was held in Milan and Cortina d'Ampezzo, Italy.	
February 8 - February 15	With the end of No.1 Sentai Gozyuger, the Super Sentai franchise enters a hiatus. The Project R.E.D. series begins with Super Space Sheriff Gavan Infinity, replacing the former series' time slot.	
March 6 - March 15	The 2026 Winter Paralympics was held in Milan and Cortina d'Ampezzo, Italy.	
March 13 - March 16	As confirmed on September 9, the final Tokyo Anime Awards Festival took place with Mobile Suit Gundam GQuuuuuuX winning the award for the television category.	
May 23	Yu-Gi-Oh! voice actor Kenjirō Tsuda filed a lawsuit against the operator of TikTok for posting videos that allegedly uses AI to imitate his voice without permission. That lawsuit was later dismissed by the Tokyo District Court on September 30, 2026.	
June 11 - July 19	The 2026 FIFA World Cup was held in Canada, Mexico, and the United States. It was won by Spain.	
June 13 - July 19	The staff members behind the Star Detective Precure! TV anime ask the fans to figure out who the secret casual identity of Cure Eclair really is. It is later revealed on July 19 that Cure Eclair's secret casual identity is Howa Kurea.	
July 19	Pretty Cure voice actors Rina Hidaka and Yūma Uchida announce the birth of their first child, a daughter.	
August 1	A new anime project related to Digimon was announced and is due to air in 2027 as part of the Digimon franchise's 30th anniversary.	
October 27	Dual Shadow ~Precure Villain Heroines~, an original spin-off of the Pretty Cure franchise, has been announced and is due to air sometime in 2027.	

== Ongoing ==
Show	Type	Channel	First aired/Japanese period		Source
NHK
NHK Amateur Song Contest	Talent show	NHK-G, NHK World Premium	March 15, 1953 (TV)	Showa	
With Mother	Kids	E-TV, NHK World Premium	October 5, 1959	Showa	
Nintama Rantarō	Anime	NHK	April 10, 1993	Heisei	
Ojarumaru	Anime	NHK	October 5, 1998	Heisei	
Utacon	Music	NHK-G, NHK World Premium	April 12, 2016	Heisei	
Nippon Television Network System
Shōten	Comedy	Nippon Television	May 15, 1966	Showa	
Soreike! Anpanman	Anime	Nippon Television	October 3, 1988	Showa	
Downtown no Gaki no Tsukai ya Arahende!!	Game show	Nippon Television	October 3, 1989	Heisei	
Detective Conan (Note: During this anime's broadcast in 2026, supporting main character Ran Mōri had her voice actress replaced)	Anime	NNS	January 8, 1996	Heisei	
Fuji Network System
Music Fair	Music	Fuji TV	August 31, 1964	Showa	
Sazae-san	Anime	Fuji TV	October 5, 1969	Showa	
FNS Music Festival	Music	FNS	July 2, 1974	Showa	
Chibi Maruko-chan	Anime	Fuji TV	January 8, 1995	Heisei	
One Piece	Anime	Fuji TV	October 20, 1999	Heisei	
TV Tokyo
Ninjala	Anime	TV Tokyo	January 8, 2022	Reiwa	
Pokémon	Anime	TV Tokyo	April 14, 2023	Reiwa	
TV Asahi
Super Hero Time (Note: Starting from 2026, the programs on the Super Hero Time block will be Kamen Rider and Project R.E.D. (Metal Hero) with Super Sentai taking a decade-long break)	Tokusatsu	TV Asahi	September 28, 2003	Heisei	
Crayon Shin-chan	Anime	TV Asahi	April 13, 1992	Heisei	
Doraemon	Anime	TV Asahi	April 15, 2005	Heisei	
Music Station	Music	TV Asahi	October 24, 1986	Showa	
TBS
SASUKE	Sports	TBS	September 26, 1997	Heisei	
Count Down TV	Music	TBS	April 7, 1993	Heisei	

== New series and returning shows ==
Show	Network	Premiere	Finale	Status	Source
Kunon the Sorcerer Can See	Tokyo MX	January 4, 2026	March 29, 2026	Series Ended	
Brothers in Arms	NHK	January 4, 2026		Ongoing	
My Hero Academia: Vigilantes (Season 2)	Tokyo MX	January 5, 2026	March 30, 2026	Series Ended	
Fire Force (Season 3, Part 2)	TBS	January 10, 2026	April 4, 2026	Series Ended	
Trigun Stargaze	TV Tokyo	January 10, 2026	March 28, 2026	Series Ended	
Scum of the Brave	Nippon TV	January 11, 2026	June 28, 2026	Series Ended	
'Tis Time for "Torture," Princess (Season 2)	Tokyo MX	January 12, 2026	March 30, 2026	Series Ended	
Oshi no Ko (Season 3)	Tokyo MX	January 14, 2026	March 25, 2026	Season Ended; Renewed for Final Season	
Ultraman New Generation Stars (Season 4)	TV Tokyo	January 24, 2026	June 20, 2026	Season Ended	
Medalist (Season 2)	TV Asahi	January 25, 2026	March 22, 2026	Series Ended	
Star Detective Precure!	TV Asahi	February 1, 2026		Ongoing	
Super Space Sheriff Gavan Infinity	TV Asahi	February 15, 2026	July 19, 2026	Series Ended	
The Scent of the Wind	NHK	March 30, 2026	September 25, 2026	Series Ended	
Dr. Stone: Science Future (Part 3)	Tokyo MX	April 2, 2026	June 25, 2026	Series Ended	
That Time I Got Reincarnated as a Slime (Season 4)	Nippon TV	April 3, 2026	September 25, 2026 (Note: Only part 1 of the That Time I Got Reincarnated as a Slime TV anime's fourth season ends on this date, with part 2 due to premiere in July 2027)	Continues 2027	
Onegai AiPri	TV Tokyo	April 5, 2026		Ongoing	
Magical Sisters LuluttoLilly	Tokyo MX	April 5, 2026		Ongoing	
Ace of Diamond Act II (Season 2)	TV Tokyo	April 5, 2026		Ongoing	
Re:Zero − Starting Life in Another World (Season 4)	TV Tokyo	April 8, 2026	September 30, 2026	Season Ended	
Mission: Yozakura Family (Season 2)	TBS	April 12, 2026		Ongoing	
Wistoria: Wand and Sword (Season 2)	TBS	April 12, 2026	June 28, 2026	Season Ended; Renewed for Season 3	
Soul Mate	Netflix	May 14, 2026	Same as premiere date	Series Ended	
Tonight, I Have a Date with a Serial Killer	Fuji TV	July 1, 2026	September 16, 2026	Series Ended	
Draw This, Then Die!	Nippon TV	July 3, 2026	September 25, 2026	Season Ended; Renewed for Season 2	
Ultraman Teo	TV Tokyo	July 4, 2026		Ongoing	
Magilumiere Co. Ltd. (Season 2)	Nippon TV	July 5, 2026	September 27, 2026	Series Ended	
Grow Up Show: Sunflower Circus	Tokyo MX	July 5, 2026	September 27, 2026	Series Ended	
Let's Go Kaikigumi	TBS	July 5, 2026	September 27, 2026	Series Ended	
Goodbye, Lara	Tokyo MX	July 6, 2026	September 21, 2026	Series Ended	
Thunder 3	Fuji TV	July 9, 2026	October 1, 2026	Season Ended; Renewed for Season 2	
Bleach: Thousand-Year Blood War (Part 4)	TV Tokyo	July 25, 2026	October 27, 2026	Series Ended	
Kakusei Hunter Omegahorn	TV Asahi	July 26, 2026		Ongoing	
Kamen Rider MY-TH	TV Asahi	September 6, 2026		Ongoing	
Happy Kanako's Killer Life (Season 2)	DMM TV	September 17, 2026	October 8, 2026	Series Ended	
Blossom	NHK	September 28, 2026		Ongoing	
Tokyo Revengers: War of the Three Titans Arc	TBS	October 2, 2026		Ongoing	
The Apothecary Diaries (Season 3, part 1)	Nippon TV	October 2, 2026		Ongoing	
Ranma ½ (2024 series, Season 3)	Nippon TV	October 3, 2026		Ongoing	
Sgt. Frog (2026 series) (Note: Officially known as Sgt. Frog☆)	TV Tokyo	October 3, 2026		Ongoing	
Super Psychic Policeman Chojo	Fuji TV	October 6, 2026		Ongoing	
Magic Knight Rayearth (2026 series)	TV Asahi	October 7, 2026		Ongoing	
Spirit Circle	TBA	December 2026		Upcoming	

== Ending ==
End date	Show	Channel	First aired	Replaced by	Source
January 17	Ultraman Omega	TV Tokyo	July 5, 2025	Ultraman New Generation Stars (Season 4)	
January 25	You and Idol Pretty Cure	TV Asahi	February 2, 2025	Star Detective Precure!	
February 8	No.1 Sentai Gozyuger (Note: The Super Sentai franchise enters a hiatus after the end of No.1 Sentai Gozyuger)	TV Asahi	February 16, 2025	Super Space Sheriff Gavan Infinity (Project R.E.D.)	
March 27	The Ghost Writer's Wife	NHK	September 29, 2025	The Scent of the Wind	
March 29	Himitsu no AiPri	TV Tokyo	April 7, 2024	Onegai AiPri	
March 29	Akko ni Omakase!	TBS	October 6, 1985	Ueda Shinya no Sunday Q	
June 20	Ultraman New Generation Stars (Season 4)	TV Tokyo	January 24, 2026	Ultraman Teo	
June 28	Scum of the Brave	Nippon TV	January 11, 2026	Magilumiere Magical Girls Inc. (Season 2)	
July 19	Super Space Sheriff Gavan Infinity	TV Asahi	February 15, 2026	Kakusei Hunter Omegahorn	
August 30	Kamen Rider ZEZTZ	TV Asahi	September 7, 2025	Kamen Rider MY-TH	
September 25	The Scent of the Wind	NHK	March 30, 2026	Blossom	
September 27	Digimon Beatbreak	Fuji TV	October 5, 2025	Digimon: The World’s Best Picks	

== Sports ==
Airdate	Sports	Network	Source
February 6 - February 22	2026 Winter Olympics	TBS	
March 6 - March 15	2026 Winter Paralympics	TBS	
June 11 - July 19	2026 FIFA World Cup	TBS	

== Special events and milestone episodes ==
Airdate	Show	Episode	Network	Source
January 3	Detective Conan	Episode ZERO	Nippon TV	
May 2	My Hero Academia	Bonus special episode	Nippon TV	
May 31	Star Detective Precure!	Crossover episode with Detective Conan	TV Asahi	
June 6	Detective Conan	Crossover episode with Star Detective Precure!	NNS	
June 26	Pokémon Anime Special: Special Party! Pokémon Everywhere!!		TV Tokyo	
September 6	Doraemon	Birthday special episode	TV Asahi	
October 25	Star Detective Precure!	Halloween special crossover episode with Ojamajo Doremi	TV Asahi	
December 31	77th NHK Kōhaku Uta Gassen		NHK	

== Deaths ==
Date	Name	Age	Notable Works	Source
January 1	Hiroshi Kume	81	Presenter, news anchor (TV Asahi)	
January 20	Kōzō Shioya	70	Voice actor (Dragon Ball Z), dubbing actor (Thomas the Tank Engine and Friends)	
January 23	Hiroyuki Kawasaki	60	Scriptwriter, series composer (After War Gundam X, B-Daman Fireblast)	
January 31	Masaru Ikeda	83	Voice actor (Yatterman, Death Note)	
February 16	Hideaki Hatta	76	President, co-founder (Kyoto Animation)	
February 20	Satoshi Mori	41	Director, writer (Cardfight!! Vanguard overDress)	
February 20	Nozomi Aoki	94	Music composer (Fist of the North Star, Galaxy Express 999)	
February 22	Reiko Katsura	89	Voice actress (Sazae-san, Shin Obake no Q-Taro, Yatterman)	
March 3	Masako Ikeda	87	Voice actress (Galaxy Express 999, Barbapapa Around the World)	
March 5	Yonehiko Kitagawa	94	Voice actor (Kinnikuman)	
March 6	Tsutomu Shibayama	84	Director (Chibi Maruko-chan, Doraemon series)	
March 9	Yukie Maeda	52	Voice actress (Kamichu!)	
April 10	Yohsuke Tamori	74	Original creator (Popolocrois)	
April 14	Kazuo Ebisawa	??	Background artist, art director (Demon Slayer: Kimetsu no Yaiba, God Eater)	
April 18	Wakana Yamazaki	61	Voice actress (Detective Conan, Sailor Moon R)	
April 24	Tatsuo Satō	61	Director (Soar High! Isami, Martian Successor Nadesico, Ninja Scroll: The Series)	
May 4	Yuji Ohno	84	Composer (Lupin III Part II)	
May 6	Kenji Ohba	71	Actor (Space Sheriff Gavan, Battle Fever J, Denshi Sentai Denjiman)	
May 14	Takahiro Fujiwara	43	Voice actor (My Hero Academia, Shinkansen Henkei Robo Shinkalion Z)	
May 21	Jun Hashimoto	86	Theme song lyricist (Galaxy Express 999)	
May 25	Yoshihiro Nishimura	59	Production coordinator (Kimagure Orange Road)	
June 4	Hiromitsu Morita	79	Chief director (Sazae-san)	
June 9	Tamao Nakamura	86	Actress (Hissatsu Shikakenin, Beppin-san)	
June 17	Riichi Seike	59	Suit actor (Dengeki Sentai Changeman, Tensou Sentai Goseiger, Bakuage Sentai Boonboomger)	
June 20	Akihiro Miwa	91	Voice actor (Maeterlinck's Blue Bird: Tyltyl and Mytyl's Adventurous Journey)	
July 2	Hikaru Kurosaki	64	Actor (MegaBeast Investigator Juspion)	
July 3	Yukiko Nikaido	87	Actress (Warm Spring), voice actress (Lupin the 3rd Part I)	
July 7	Yōko Umezu	??	Original creator (Kinsō no Vermeil)	
July 12	Masayasu Sagisu	93	Anime producer (Sazae-san, Super Jetter, Tetsujin 28-go)	
July 20	Katsushi Murakami	83	Mechanical designer (Shin Tetsujin 28, Super Sentai franchise)	
August 1	Ryotaro Shimizu	37	Actor (Full Swing), impressionist	
August 22	Yūji Yanase	59	Animator, animation director (Symphogear), episode director (Yo-kai Watch, Pokémon (XY series))	
August 26	Toshio Masuda	98	Series composer (Space Battleship Yamato)	
August 29	Toru Shinagawa	90	Voice actor (Sorcerer Hunters)	
September 4	Leo Morimoto	83	Voice actor (Bartender), dubbing actor (Thomas the Tank Engine and Friends)	
September 18	Sō Kuramoto	91	Screenwriter (Katsu Kaishū, Zero-sen Hayato)	
September 26	Asami Yaguchi	47	Voice actress (Tamagotchi!, Net Ghost PiPoPa)	
September 28	Naoki Bandō	69	Voice actor (Yo-kai Watch, One-Punch Man)	
September 29	Toyoto Kogisu	69	Scriptwriter (Detective Conan)	
September 30	Kenichirō Katsura	59	Animator (Macross 7, Synduality: Noir)	
October 3	Masako Watanabe	97	Original creator (Glass no Shiro)	
October 11	Hiroshi Tsuchida	54	Actor (Ninja Sentai Kakuranger), voice actor (Pokémon (XY series), Attack on Titan)	
October 20	Ryūji Nakagi	89	Voice actor (Tomatoman, Fūsen Shōjo Temple-chan)	
October 22	Tetsuya Chiba	87	Original creator (Ashita no Joe, Notari Matsutarō)	
November 16	Noa Nakada	23	Actress (Ultraman Teo)	
November 16	Yukio Yamagata	69	Theme song performer (Bakusō Kyōdai Let's & Go!!, Hyakujuu Sentai Gaoranger)	
