= Nobuhiko =

- Gender: Male

Origin
- Origin: Japanese
- Meaning: Different meanings depending on the kanji used

Nobuhiko (written: 信彦, 延彦, 伸彦 or 宣彦) is a masculine Japanese given name. Notable people with the name include:

- Nobuhiko Endō (遠藤 宣彦; born 1963), Japanese politician
- Nobuhiko Haijima (蓜島 伸彦; born 1970), Japanese illustrator of children's books
- Nobuhiko Hasegawa (長谷川 信彦; 1947–2005), Japanese table tennis player
- Nobuhiko Higashikuni (東久邇 信彦; 1945–2019), Japanese aristocrat and former Imperial prince
- Nobuhiko Kawamoto (川本 信彦; born 1936), Japanese businessman
- Nobuhiko Matsunaka (松中 信彦; born 1973), Japanese baseball player
- Nobuhiko Morino (森野 宣彦; born 1970), Japanese film composer
- Nobuhiko Obayashi (大林 宣彦; 1938–2020), Japanese film director screenwriter and editor
- Nobuhiko Ochiai (落合 信彦; 1942–2026), Japanese journalist and novelist
- Nobuhiko Okamoto (岡本 信彦; born 1986), Japanese voice actor and singer
- Nobuhiko Oshima (大島 伸彦; born 1977), Japanese professional wrestler
- Nobuhiko Takada (髙田 延彦; born 1962), Japanese mixed martial artist and professional wrestler
- Nobuhiko Ushiba (牛場 信彦; 1909–1984), Japanese diplomat
