= Noa Nakada =

Japanese film and television actress

- Born: 21 June 2003; Ishikawa Prefecture, Japan
- Died: November 2026 (aged 23)
- Occupations: Film and television actress

Noa Nakada (21 June 2003 – November 2026) was a Japanese film and television actress.

== Life and career ==
Nakada was born in Ishikawa Prefecture on 21 June 2003. In 2016, she was a finalist for the Toho Cinderella Audition. She began her screen career in 2019, appearing in the film We Are Little Zombies. In 2021, she appeared in the NHK drama television series Premium Drama. In the same year, she starred as Hikari Mido in the film My Daddy.

Later in her career, in 2024, Nakada starred as Shiori Kobikino in the film Dull Chocolaffillé Biennale. In the same year, she played Misuzu Kaburagi in the MBS drama television series Smells Like Green Spirit, and played Kyoko Nonomiya in the Tōkai TV television series The Smiling Lady. In 2026, she starred as Kanna Izumi in the TXN tokusatsu drama television series Ultraman Teo.

Nakada died in November 2026, at the age of 23.
