= Rurikei Prefectural Natural Park =

Ravine in Nantan, Kyoto, Japan

- 府立るり渓自然公園
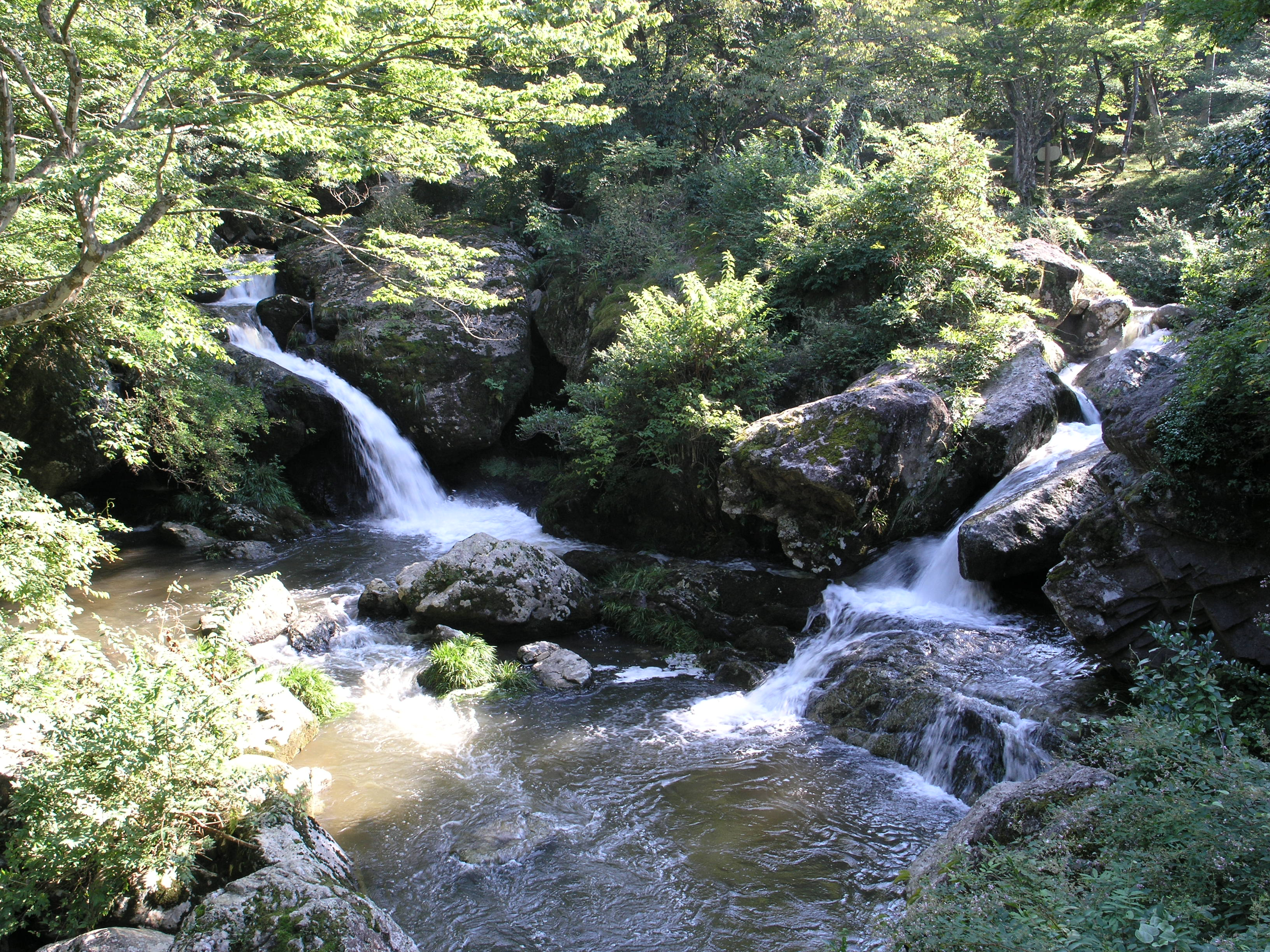
- Rurikei
- Interactive map of Rurikei Prefectural Natural Park
- Location: Kyōto Prefecture, Japan
- Area: 0.36 km^{2} (0.14 sq mi)

Rurikei Prefectural Natural Park (府立るり渓自然公園, Furitsu Rurikei shizen kōen) is a Prefectural Natural Park in central Kyōto Prefecture, Japan. The park flanks the Sonobe River (園部川) within the municipality of Nantan. Rurikei is a nationally designated Place of Scenic Beauty.

== See also ==
- National Parks of Japan
- Killing of Yuki Adachi
