= Aoi Fujino =

Japanese gravure idol (1998–2026)

- Born: September 29, 1998; Kanazawa, Ishikawa Prefecture, Japan
- Died: 5 January 2026 (aged 27)
- Occupation: Gravure idol
- Years active: 2020–2025
- Employer: Switch Promotion

Aoi Fujino (藤乃 あおい, Fujino Aoi; 29 September 1998 – 5 January 2026) was a Japanese gravure idol. After making her debut in July 2020, she posed for several magazines such as Flash, won several awards, and released a photobook in 2022. She took a brief hiatus in 2023 and 2024 after being diagnosed with cancer, and retired shortly before her death.

== Life and career ==
=== Early life ===
Fujino, a native of Kanazawa, was born on 29 September 1998, and her family home was located in an area near the Sai River. She played badminton during elementary and junior high school, and she joined the light music club during high school, but rarely went to school during her last two years at the latter and worked part-time almost constantly.

After dropping out from a fashion vocational school due to her issues with personal vision, she returned to her hometown and spent two years working part-time as a freeter, co-managing an izakaya at night with its owner. After meeting up with a scout from her vocational school, Fujino moved to Tokyo and debuted as a gravure idol in July 2020.

=== Entertainment career ===
Her first image video, Walk!, was released by SpiceVisual in November 2020 and ranked first in DMM's 2021 Gravure Idol Image Video Annual Sales chart. In October 2021, she modeled for Platinum Flash Vol. 17 alongside several idols from the AKB48 Group and Sakamichi Series. In December 2021, she won the Grand Prix at the Gravure of the Year 2021 awards. She also won the Weekly Playboy 2021 East Top Yokozuna title and the Photo Session Grand Prize at the 2021 Tokyo Lily Annual MVP Awards. On 3 March 2022, she was part of Weekly Young Jump's Young Jump BuzzGirls unit. In August 2022, she made her semi-nude debut on Flash. On 25 August 2022, her first photobook, Aoi, was released by Futabasha.

Due to her proportions, Fujino was known as the "Kaga-hyakumangoku Bust" and the "Dynamite Body of Hokuriku". Zakzak said that "she graced evening newspapers, sports newspapers, and web news with her characteristic bright smile and beautiful gravure photos," and Oricon News also noted that she was "known for her captivating bikini appearances". However, she initially recalled in 2021 that her figure was a source of insecurity for her, before overcoming it by September 2025.

In addition to modeling, she also made appearances on television shows, including in the variety show Nikenme Dōsuru?.

=== Personal life ===
Fujino was a whiskey lover, and her favorite Scotch brand was Macallan.

==== Illness and death ====
After feeling unwell for a few months, Fujino was diagnosed with a malignant rhabdomyosarcoma. She announced her cancer diagnosis in April 2023 and left the hospital in July 2023. She returned to gravure idol work in August 2024. She won the Comeback Award in Weekly Playboy's Gravure of the Year 2024 Awards. She revealed in an interview around the time that she had to regain the weight she lost due to her radiation therapy, and that she was wearing a wig in August since her hair had not grown back yet.

Fujino left Switch Promotion on 31 March 2025, but announced at the time she would still be a freelancer. She won the Gravure of the Year Lifetime Achievement Award in December 2025. She retired on 31 December 2025, citing her worsening health. She died on 5 January 2026, at the age of 27.
