= Kōtarō Kodama =

Japanese politician (1934–2026)

Kōtarō Kodama (Japanese: 児玉更太郎; 21 March 1934 – 11 January 2026) was a Japanese politician.

== Life and career ==
Kodama was born in Akitakata, Hiroshima Prefecture on 21 March 1934. He graduated from the Faculty of Agriculture at Tottori University. In 1969, he was elected as a member of the Akitakata Town Council. In addition, he served as vice chairman of the National Association of Towns and Villages and the chairman of Hiroshima Prefecture.

In 1980 he was elected as the mayor of Akitakata. He held the position until he retired in 2008.

On 11 January 2026, Kodama died at the age of 91.
