= Seigō Tsuchida =

Japanese politician (1943–2026)

- 土田正剛

Mayor of Higashine
- In office 5 September 1998 – 16 April 2026

Member of the Yamagata Prefectural Assembly
- In office 30 April 1979 – 1993

Personal details
- Born: October 25, 1943 Higashine, Yamagata Prefecture, Japan
- Died: April 16, 2026 (aged 82) Yamagata, Yamagata Prefecture, Japan
- Party: (Liberal Democratic Party→); Independent
- Relatives: Masayuki Tsuchida (father)
- Education: Keio University
- Occupation: Secretary to Yuzo Matsuzawa, Member of the House of Representatives

Seigō Tsuchida (Japanese: 土田正剛, romanized: Tsuchida Seigō; October 25, 1943 – April 16, 2026) was a Japanese politician. He served as the Mayor of Higashine, Yamagata Prefecture between 1998 and his death in 2026. Tsuchida was a member of the Yamagata Prefectural Assembly for four terms.

== Early life ==
Seigō Tsuchida was born in Higashine, Yamagata Prefecture on October 25, 1943. He graduated from Yamagata Prefectural Yamagata Higashi High School. In March 1967, he graduated from the Keio University Faculty of Law. In May 1969, he became a secretary to House of Representatives member Yuzo Matsuzawa. In December 1974, he became a ministerial secretary to Matsuzawa, who had been appointed a Minister of State.

== Career ==
On April 30, 1979, he was elected to the Yamagata Prefectural Assembly. He was elected for four consecutive terms. During his time in the assembly, he belonged to the Liberal Democratic Party, serving as the chairman of the prefectural party's organization committee, policy research council chairman, and secretary-general.

On February 14, 1993, he ran for the Yamagata gubernatorial election with the support of the LDP mainstream, including Koichi Kato and Riichiro Chioka, as well as endorsements from Komeito, the Democratic Socialist Party, and the Sports and Peace Party, but was defeated.

In 1998, he ran for the Higashine mayoral election and was elected for the first time without a vote. He took office on September 5 of the same year. In 2018, he achieved his sixth consecutive election (all unopposed).

On May 25, 2020, to secure funds for measures against the COVID-19 pandemic, he submitted an ordinance proposal to the city council to reduce the monthly salaries of himself, the vice mayor, and the superintendent of education by 20% from June to March 2021. The proposal was passed unanimously on the same day.

In the mayoral election held on August 28, 2022, the first contested race in 28 years, he defeated a newcomer and former city council member to secure a 7th term. However, around this time, he was diagnosed with multiple myeloma and continued to undergo treatment with chemotherapy while performing his official duties.

During the city council plenary session on March 3, 2026, Tsuchida was absent due to hospitalization for a fever. Through Vice Mayor Keiichi Suzuki, he revealed that he had multiple myeloma and announced his intention not to run for the mayoral election in the fall, retiring at the end of his term due to poor health. About a month and a half after his retirement announcement, on the afternoon of April 16, he died at a hospital in Yamagata. Tsuchida was 82.

Following Tsuchida's death, Vice Mayor Shinji Sato became the acting mayor from April 17. Furthermore, the Higashine City Election Commission decided to move forward the mayoral election, which was originally scheduled for August 23.

== Bibliography ==
- Yamagata Prefectural Assembly History Compilation Committee, ed. Directory of Successive Members of the Yamagata Prefectural Assembly, Second Edition, Yamagata Prefectural Assembly, 2000.
