= Ultraman Teo =

Japanese television series

- Genre: Tokusatsu; Kaiju; Kyodai Hero; Science fiction; Super Hero; Drama
- Screenplay by: Uiko Miura; Jun Tsugita; Ryo Ikeda
- Story by: Shigenori Tanabe
- Directed by: Takashi Ninomiya (Note: Series director. Episodes directors are Takanori Tsujimoto, Makoto Kamiya, Naoyuki Uchida, Ryuta Miyazaki, and Ryotaro Kogushi.)
- Starring: Aoi Iwasaki; Amane Kamiya; Noa Nakada; Yu Uemura; Ryoma Morimoto; Rila Fukushima; Makita Sports
- Voices of: Yū Kobayashi
- Opening theme: "LINK HEARTS"; by ASTRO DONUTS
- Composer: Yajiuma
- Country of origin: Japan
- Original language: Japanese
- No. of episodes: 19

Production
- Executive producer: Masahiro Onda
- Producers: Yusuke Okamoto; Sachiyo Nakao; Junko Oishi; Wataru Tanaka
- Cinematography: Satoshi Murakawa
- Editors: Yosuke Yafune; Godai Inaba; Motoki Kashiwakura; Hisashi Moritsu
- Running time: 30 minutes
- Production companies: Tsuburaya Productions; TV Tokyo; Dentsu

Original release
- Network: TXN (TV Tokyo)
- Release: July 4, 2026 – present

Related
- Ultraman Omega

Ultraman Teo (ウルトラマンテオ, Urutoraman Teo) is a Japanese tokusatsu drama series produced by Tsuburaya Productions. It is the 31st entry (41st overall) in the Ultra Series, released to commemorate the 60th anniversary for the franchise. The series began airing on all TXN-affiliated networks in Japan on July 4, 2026.

== Episodes ==
No.	Title	Directed by	Written by	Original release date
SP	"Ultraman Teo Preview Special"; Transliteration: "Urutoraman Teo Chokuzen Supesharu" (Japanese: ウルトラマンテオ直前スペシャル)	Toshiki Hata	Ryo Ikeda	June 27, 2026
1	"The Man Who Came from H12"; Transliteration: "Eichi Wan Tsū kara Kita Otoko" (Japanese: H12から来た男)	Takashi Ninomiya	Shigenori Tanabe	July 4, 2026
2	"Welcome to the Astronomy Club"; Transliteration: "Yōkoso Tenmon Kenkyūkai e" (Japanese: ようこそ天文研究会へ)	Takashi Ninomiya	Shigenori Tanabe	July 11, 2026
3	"The Marked Mini Kaiju"; Transliteration: "Nerawareta Puchi Kaijū" (Japanese: 狙われたプチ怪獣)	Takashi Ninomiya	Shigenori Tanabe	July 18, 2026
4	"Workshop, Watch Out!"; Transliteration: "Wākushoppu ni Ki o Tsukero" (Japanese: ワークショップに気をつけろ)	Takashi Ninomiya	Shigenori Tanabe	July 25, 2026
5	"Space Pod Repossession!"; Transliteration: "Uchū Poddo o Dakkan Seyo!" (Japanese: 宇宙ポッドを奪還せよ！)	Takashi Ninomiya	Shigenori Tanabe	August 1, 2026
6	"Pucchi's Big Move"; Transliteration: "Putchī no Ohikkoshi" (Japanese: プッチーのお引越し)	Takashi Ninomiya	Shigenori Tanabe	August 8, 2026
7	"Abandoned Kaiju"; Transliteration: "Suterareta Kaijū" (Japanese: 捨てられた怪獣)	Takashi Ninomiya	Shigenori Tanabe	August 15, 2026
SP	"Greetings from Hyper Space"; Transliteration: "Chō Jikū kara Kon'nichiwa" (Japanese: 超時空からこんにちは)	Toshiki Hata	Jun Tsugita	August 22, 2026
8	"The Final Ghost Member"; Transliteration: "Saigo no Yūrei Buin" (Japanese: 最後の幽霊部員)	Takashi Ninomiya	Shigenori Tanabe	August 29, 2026
9	"The Static Reach"; Transliteration: "Soitsu wa Antatchaburu" (Japanese: そいつはアンタッチャブル)	Takashi Ninomiya	Shigenori Tanabe	September 5, 2026
10	"Let's Go to Training Camp!"; Transliteration: "Gasshuku ni Ikō!" (Japanese: 合宿に行こう！)	Takashi Ninomiya	Shigenori Tanabe	September 12, 2026
11	"The Mysterious Boy"; Transliteration: "Nazo no Shōnen" (Japanese: 謎の少年)	Takanori Tsujimoto	Shigenori Tanabe	September 19, 2026
12	"A Hero's Determination"; Transliteration: "Tatakau Mono no Kakugo" (Japanese: 闘う者の覚悟)	Takanori Tsujimoto	Shigenori Tanabe	September 26, 2026
13	"Minobe's Special Lecture"; Transliteration: "Minobe no Tokubetsu Jugyō" (Japanese: 美濃部の特別授業)	Ryuta Miyazaki	Ryo Ikeda	October 3, 2026
14	"Miss U"; Transliteration: "Aitai" (Japanese: アイタイ)	Takashi Ninomiya	Uiko Miura	October 10, 2026
15	"Dragon's Lair"; Transliteration: "Ryū no Sumika" (Japanese: 龍の住処)	Takashi Ninomiya	Uiko Miura	October 17, 2026
SP	"Another Greetings from Hyper Space"; Transliteration: "Zoku Chō Jikū kara Kon'nichiwa" (Japanese: 続・超時空からこんにちは)	Toshiki Hata	Jun Tsugita	October 24, 2026
16	"Hierarchy of Life"; Transliteration: "Inochi no Jun'i" (Japanese: いのちの順位)	Makoto Kamiya	Jun Tsugita	October 31, 2026
17	"Between Ideal and Reality"; Transliteration: "Risō to no Hazama de" (Japanese: 理想とのはざまで)	Makoto Kamiya	Jun Tsugita	November 7, 2026
18	"Emma's Secret"; Transliteration: "Ema no Himitsu" (Japanese: エマの秘密)	Makoto Kamiya	Shigenori Tanabe	November 14, 2026
19	"Alien Pandemic"; Transliteration: "Pandemikku Uchūjin" (Japanese: パンデミック宇宙人)	Makoto Kamiya	Shigenori Tanabe	November 21, 2026
20	"Pucchi the Super-Fan"; Transliteration: "Putchī no Oshikatsu" (Japanese: プッチーの推し活)	Takashi Ninomiya	Uiko Miura	November 28, 2026

== Production ==
Ultraman Teo was first trademarked and registered by Tsuburaya Productions on December 3, 2025, and published on December 11, 2025. The series was fully revealed on April 17, 2026, alongside a short initial trailer.

== Broadcast ==
Ultraman Teo began airing in all TXN-affiliated networks in Japan on July 4, 2026, with simultaneous worldwide broadcast and distribution in multiple languages.

== Cast ==
Character	Japanese cast	English voice cast
Ibuki Mitsuishi (光石 イブキ, Mitsuishi Ibuki)	Aoi Iwasaki (岩崎 碧, Iwasaki Aoi)	Justin Briner
Emma Kazama (風間 エマ, Kazama Ema)	Amane Kamiya (神谷 天音, Kamiya Amane)	Rachelle Heger
Kanna Izumi (和泉 カンナ, Izumi Kanna)	Noa Nakada (中田 乃愛, Nakada Noa)	Jenny Yokobori
Rintaro Hiura (火浦 リンタロウ, Hiura Rintarō)	Yu Uemura (上村 侑, Uemura Yu)	Yung-I Chang
Wataru Tomabechi (苫米地 ワタル, Tomabechi Wataru)	Ryoma Morimoto (森本 竜馬, Morimoto Ryōma)	Mauricio Ortiz-Segura
Kyoko Shiga (志賀 今日子, Shiga Kyōko)	Rila Fukushima (福島 リラ, Fukushima Rira)	Emma Breezy
Junpei Minobe (美濃部 順平, Minobe Junpei)	Makita Sports (マキタスポーツ, Makita Supōtsu)	Steven Kelly
Pucchi (プッチー, Putchī; Voice)	Yū Kobayashi (小林 ゆう, Kobayashi Yū)	

=== Guest cast ===
- Bystanders (1): Kenji Kawai (川井 憲次, Kawai Kenji), Takao Konishi (小西 貴雄, Konoshi Takao), Yasuharu Takanashi (高梨 康治, Takanashi Yasuharu)
- Aokiman (アオキマン; 6, 12, 17, 19): Jin Katagiri (片桐 仁, Katagiri Jin)
- Kazuko Eto (江藤 一子, Etō Kazuko; 7): Suzuka Ohgo (大後 寿々花, Ōgo Suzuka)
- Takayuki Tsukahara (塚原 貴行, Tsukahara Takayuki; 8–9): Shirō Sano (佐野 史郎, Sano Shirō)
- Ultraman Zero (ウルトラマンゼロ, Urutoraman Zero; Voice; 11–12): Mamoru Miyano (宮野 真守, Miyano Mamoru), Sean Schemmel (English)
- Tamayo Izumi (和泉 環代, Izumi Tamayo; 15): Reiko Tajima (田島 令子, Tajima Reiko)

== Theme song ==
- "LINK HEARTS"
  - Lyrics: Shigenori Tanabe (田辺 茂範, Tanabe Shigenori)
  - Composition: Kenji Kawai, Takao Konishi, Yasuharu Takanashi
  - Arrangement: Yajiuma (野次馬)
  - Artist: ASTRO DONUTS
  - Episodes: 2-13 (Verse 1), 14 (Verse 2)
  In episode 1, this song is used as an insert song.

== See also ==
- Ultra Series – Complete list of official Ultraman-related shows.
