= Yoshihisa Uchida =

Japanese politician (1925–2026)

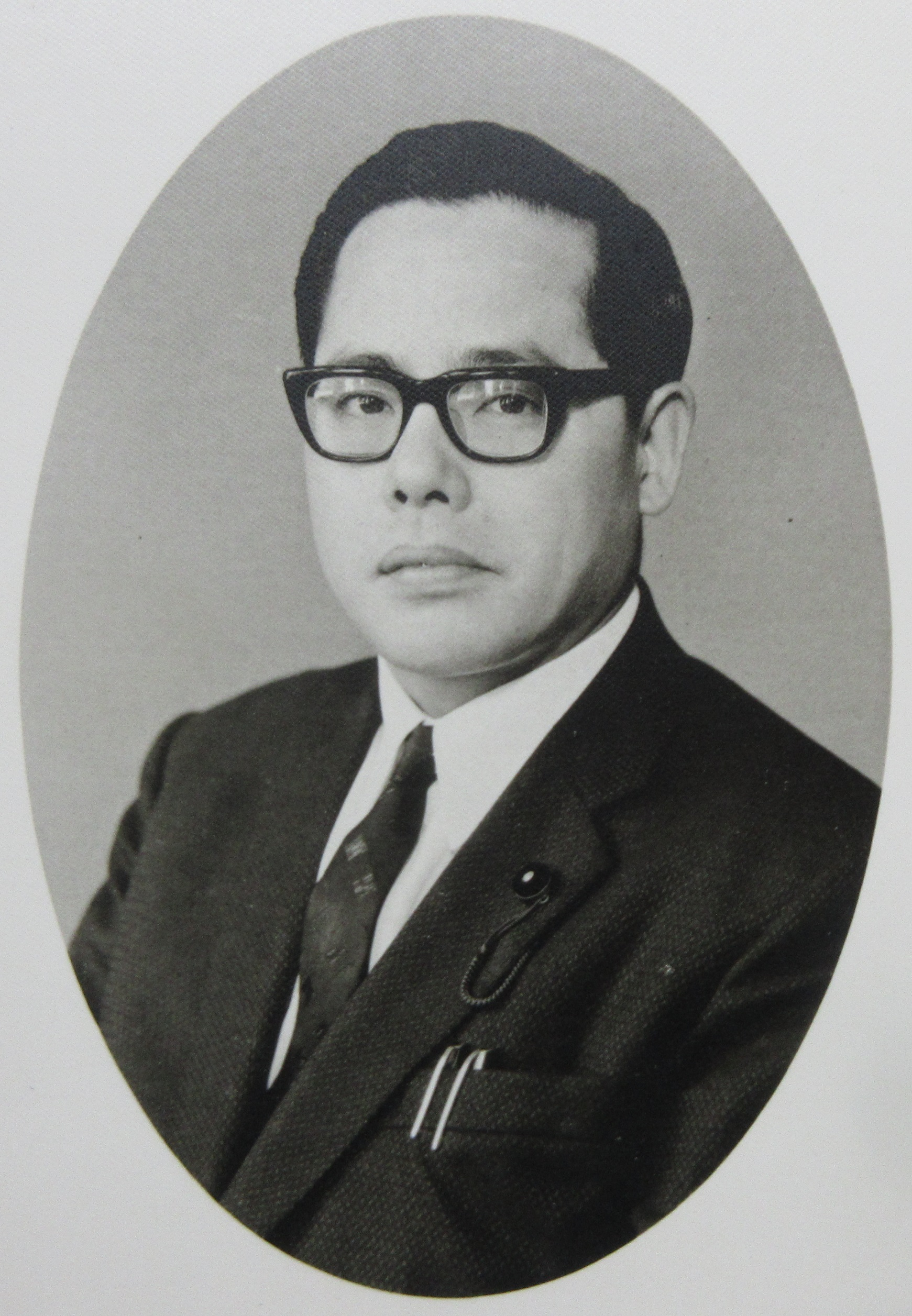
Yoshihisa Uchida

Yoshihisa Uchida (Japanese: 内田喜久; January 5, 1925 – June 5, 2026) was a Japanese politician.

== Life and career ==
Uchida was born in Iwazu, Nukata District, Aichi Prefecture on January 5, 1925. He was a member of the Aichi Prefectural Assembly between 1963 and 1971. He was also the Mayor of Okazaki City (May 2, 1971 to June 30, 1980).

In 1980, he was arrested alongside a number of other counselors, on charges of bribery.

Uchida died on June 5, 2026, at the age of 101.
