= Killing of Yuki Adachi =

2026 killing in Kyoto, Japan

Coordinates: 35.0964°N 135.4608°E

- Undated photo of Adachi

- 1: Location where the bag was found 2: Location where the shoe was found X: Location where the body was found
- Location: Nantan, Kyoto, Japan
- Date: March 23, 2026 – April 13, 2026 (search) c. March 23, 2026 (death); April 13, 2026 (discovery of body)
- Attack type: Child homicide
- Victim: Yuki Adachi (age 11)
- Accused: Yūki Adachi
- Charges: Child murder, Abandonment of a corpse

On April 13, 2026, the body of Yuki Adachi (安達結希) was found in the mountains of Nantan, Kyoto, Japan, following three weeks of searching. Yūki Adachi, the victim's adoptive father, confessed to having killed the victim on March 23, the day the victim was reported missing, prompting a search operation. The Kyoto Prefectural Police dubbed the case as the Nantan City Child Murder and Body Abandonment Case (南丹市児童殺人遺体遺棄事件, Nantan-shi Jidō Satsujin Itai Iki Jiken).

== Background ==
Yuki Adachi (安達結希; c. 2015 – c. March 23, 2026) was a resident of Nantan, Kyoto, and a fifth-grade student of Sonobe Elementary School. He was 11 years old at the time of his disappearance. His adoptive father, Yūki Yamamoto (山本優季), who later legally changed his name to Yūki Adachi (安達優季) after marriage is a 37-year-old electrical machinery and equipment company worker in Kyoto Prefecture. Yuki's biological father and his mother had divorced, and she had gotten remarried to Yamamoto. Yamamoto later became the adoptive father of Yuki and they lived in the same house. According to various people close to Yuki, he had expressed dislike for his stepfather before his disappearance.

== Disappearance and search ==
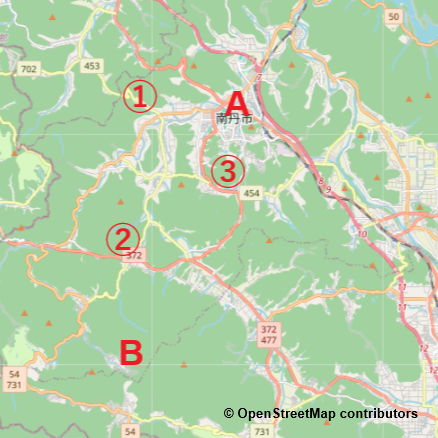
Map of Nantan, Kyoto; A: Sonobe Elementary School; B: Victim's home; 1: Location where the victim's bag was found; 2: Location where the shoe of the victim was found; 3: Location where the body of the victim was found

According to his adoptive father's testimony, Yuki Adachi went to school in his adoptive father's car and was dropped off in front of the Sonobe Elementary School in the parking lot around 8:00 JST on March 23, 2026. The home room teacher noticed that Yuki was missing during the checking of attendance. Following a graduation ceremony held at the school on that date, he was expected to leave at 11:30, but when he was nowhere to be found, the school contacted the victim's mother at around 11:50. The victim's mother contacted 110, the police-specific emergency number, around noon. A police search then began. The prefecture deployed 1,000 officers during the search.

On March 29, a 110 call stated that a relative had found Yuki's bag in a mountainous area about 3 kilometres (1.9 mi) west of Sonobe Elementary School. A shoe belonging to him was found in the mountains about 6 kilometres (3.7 mi) southwest of Sonobe Elementary School on April 12. On April 13, police found a body believed to be Yuki in the mountains 2 kilometres (1.2 mi) southwest of the school. The body was lying supine and wearing a dark blue fleece jacket and beige trousers. An autopsy result released on April 14 confirmed that the body was Yuki Adachi.

== Investigation ==
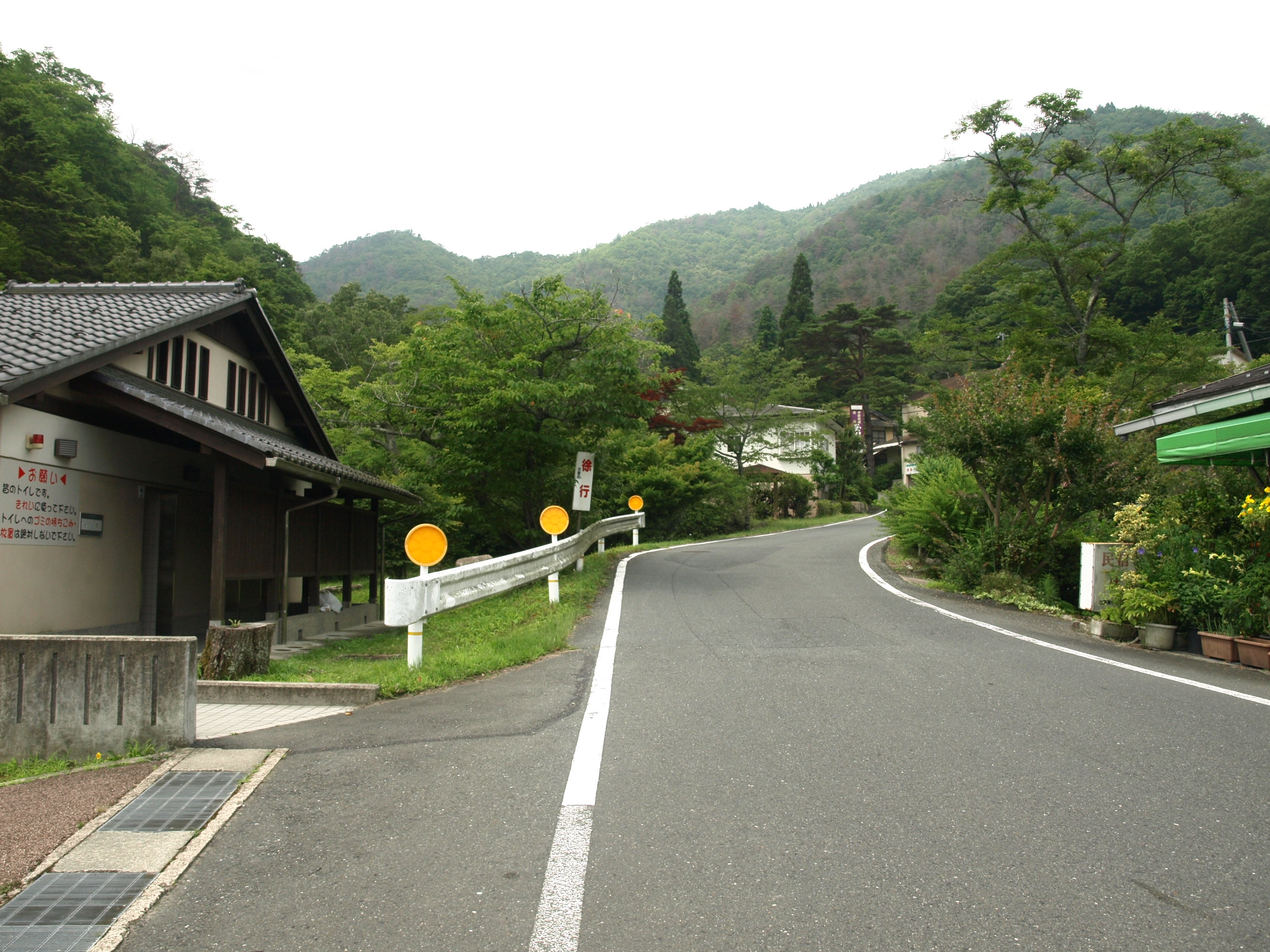
Public restroom near Rurikei Prefectural Natural Park where the victim was allegedly killed.

According to the autopsy report, the victim was estimated to have died around late March. It is believed that the victim died of asphyxiation from strangling.

On April 16 at a press conference, the Kyoto Prefectural Police revealed that Adachi was still alive during the morning of March 23. According to the investigation, on March 23, after driving towards the school without dropping Yuki off, Yūki killed him in a public restroom at the Rurikei Prefectural Natural Park about 2 kilometres (1.2 mi) northwest of their home. The police also suspected that Yuki's body was moved at least four times before being found. According to the police, the body was first moved to a hill behind the suspect's home on March 24, then to the mountain where his school bag was found, and to the mountain where his shoes were found, and then a few days later to the fourth location in the woods where the body was discovered.

The search history of Yūki's smartphone showed that he had looked up how to dispose of a body. An analysis of the car used by Yūki showed that footage from the outward-facing dashcam on March 23 was missing, and the school's CCTV footage did not capture Yuki walking into the school. In addition, CCTV footage from Sonobe Station shows there was no evidence that Yuki had traveled by train or bus.

== Arrest and trial ==
On April 15, the Kyoto Prefectural Police raided Yūki's house on suspicion of abandonment of a corpse and questioned his relatives. Yūki confessed to killing the victim during voluntary questioning. He said that he had strangled Yuki and that he killed the victim because he got angry about things the victim said, such as "You're not my real father", when he was driving the victim to school.

He was arrested on April 16 on suspicion of transporting, concealing, and abandoning Yuki's body in Nantan City sometime between the morning of March 23 and 4:45 p.m. on April 13. He became a suspect through investigations using security camera footage. His detention was extended by Kyoto District Court until May 6 on April 24. He was re-arrested on May 6.

He pleaded guilty on May 27, and was indicted by the Kyoto District Court on May 28. He was charged with murder and corpse abandonment.

== Reactions ==
Following the discovery of Adachi's body, various people offered flowers and sweets near the place where Adachi's body was found. Classes were cancelled at Sonobe Elementary School on April 14.

Formosa Television in Taiwan reported a false rumor about the suspect's nationality, claiming that the suspect was a Chinese citizen and was 24 years old. The station later apologized. Kansai Television issued an apology after accidentally filming and broadcasting footage of a different person three times while attempting to film Yūki being escorted to the Kyoto District Public Prosecutors Office.

== See also ==
- List of solved missing person cases (2020s)
