= Fumiko Takeshita =

Japanese author (1957–2026)

Fumiko Takeshita (Japanese:竹下文子; February 18, 1957 – March 10, 2026) was a Japanese children's literature writer and picture book author.

== Life and career ==
Takeshita was born in Fukuoka Prefecture on February 18, 1957. She graduated from the Faculty of Education, Tokyo Gakugei University.

Throughout her career, she published numerous books, as well as translations.

Takeshita died from cancer on March 10, 2026, at the age of 69.
