= Hirohiko Okano =

Japanese poet (1924–2026)

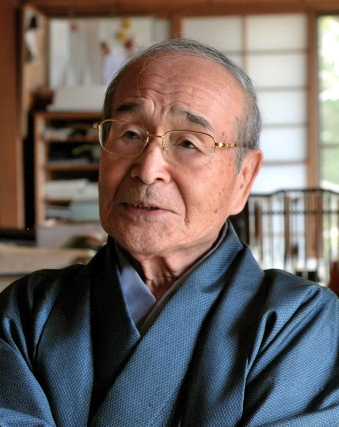
Hirohiko Okano

Hirohiko Okano (Japanese: 岡野弘彦; July 7, 1924 – April 24, 2026) was a Japanese poet.

== Life and work ==
Okano was born in Misugi (now Tsu), Mie Prefecture on July 7, 1924. Throughout his life, he published numerous collections of poetry, songs and essays.

He was named Professor Emeritus of Kokugakuin University.

Okano died from heart failure in Setagaya, Tokyo, on April 24, 2026, at the age of 101.

== Awards ==
- 1967: The 11th Contemporary Pots Association Award for "Winter Family".
- 1972: The 7th Kaku Award for "Cangronga" and others.
- 1988: Purple Ribbon Medal
- 1998: Order of the Third Class of the Order of the Treasure.
