= Takahiro Fujiwara =

Japanese voice actor (1982–2026)

- Born: July 15, 1982; Sapporo, Hokkaido, Japan
- Died: May 14, 2026 (aged 43)
- Occupation: Voice actor

Takahiro Fujiwara (Japanese:藤原貴弘; July 15, 1982 – May 14, 2026) was a Japanese voice actor.

== Life and career ==
Fujiwara was born in Sapporo on July 15, 1982. He was known for his roles in My Hero Academia, Berserk: The Golden Age Arc, and Captain Earth.

Fujiwara died on May 14, 2026, at the age of 43.
