= Kazuo Ebisawa =

Japanese art director (1953–2026)

Kazuo Ebisawa (1953 – 14 April 2026) was a Japanese art director and background artist.

== Career ==
Ebisawa was born in 1953. Throughout his career, he worked on a number of Anime productions, including; Today's Menu for the Emiya Family, Demon Slayer: Kimetsu no Yaiba, Fate/Zero, Fate/stay night: Unlimited Blade Works, GYO: Tokyo Fish Attack, Master of Mosquiton, God Eater, and Tales of Zestiria the X.

He was also a designer for the 1988 film Akira.

He died 14 April 2026, with Ufotable announcing his death.
