= Nobuhiko Ochiai =

Japanese journalist (1942–2026)

Nobuhiko Ochiai (Japanese: 落合信彦; 8 January 1942 – 1 February 2026) was a Japanese journalist and novelist.

== Life and career ==
Ochiai was born in Asakusa, Tokyo, Japan on 8 January 1942.

He wrote works that reported on international affairs and intelligence-related situations, novels and translations based on them, and in later years, many life guidebooks for young people.

Ochiai died on 1 February 2026, at the age of 84.
