= 2020s =

Decade of the Gregorian calendar (2020–2029)

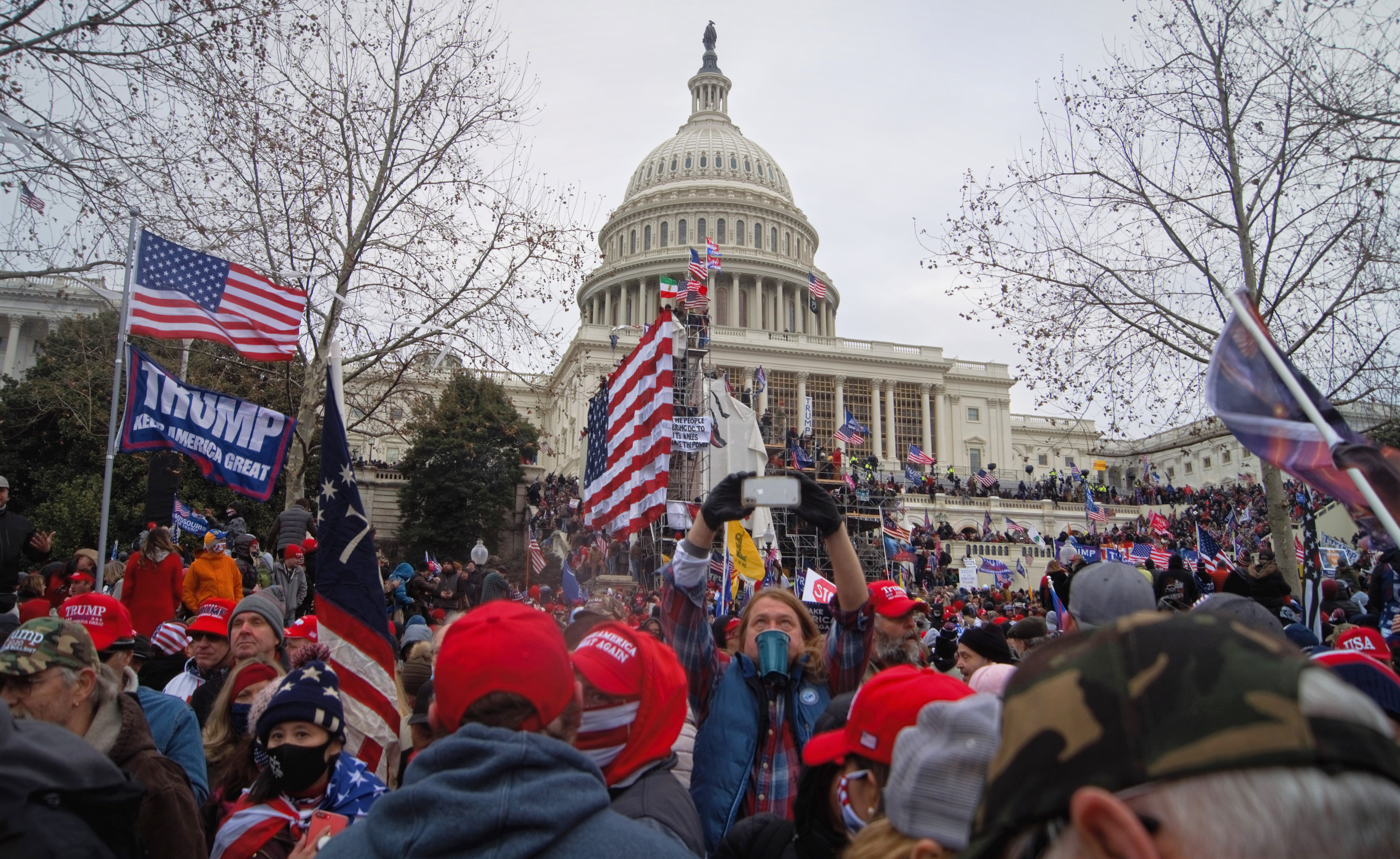
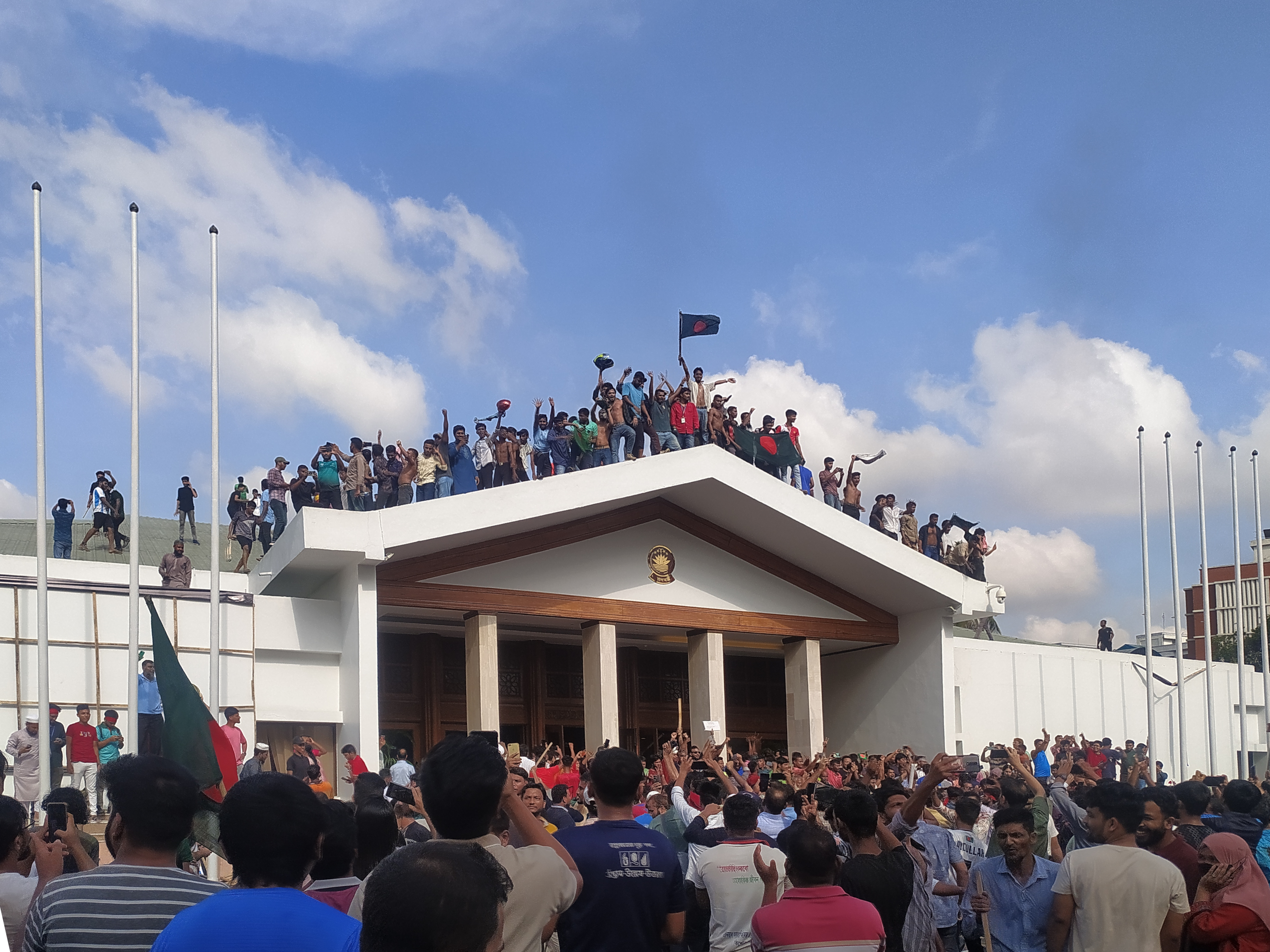
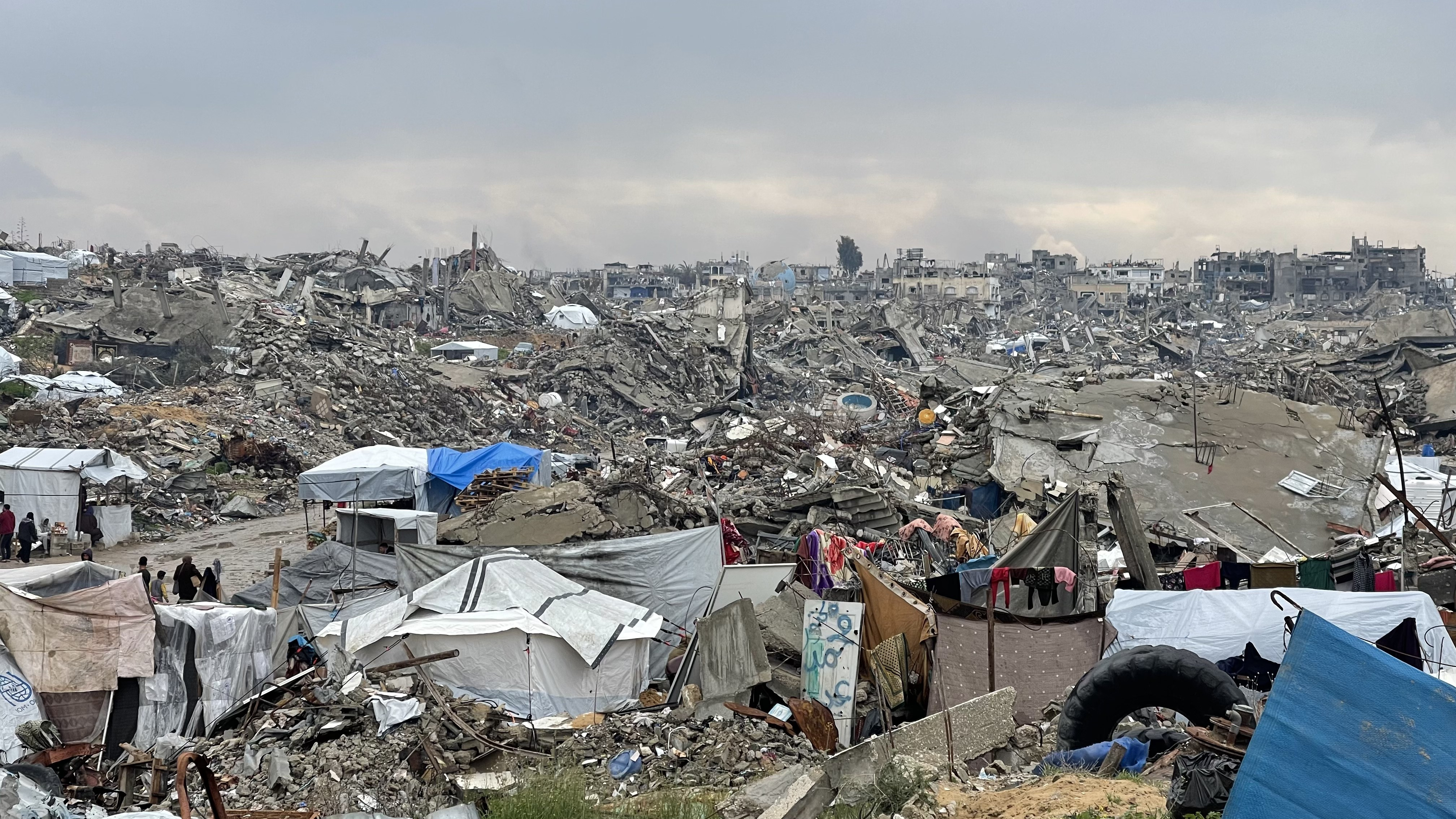
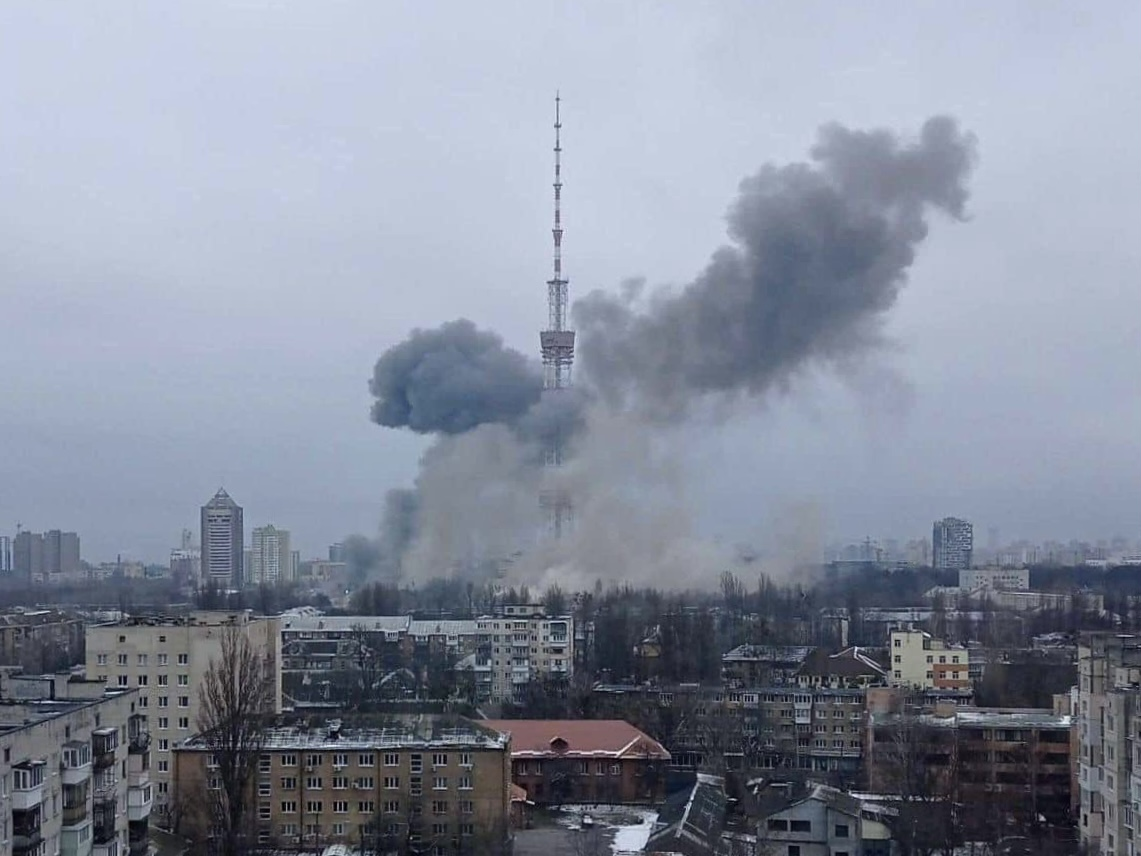
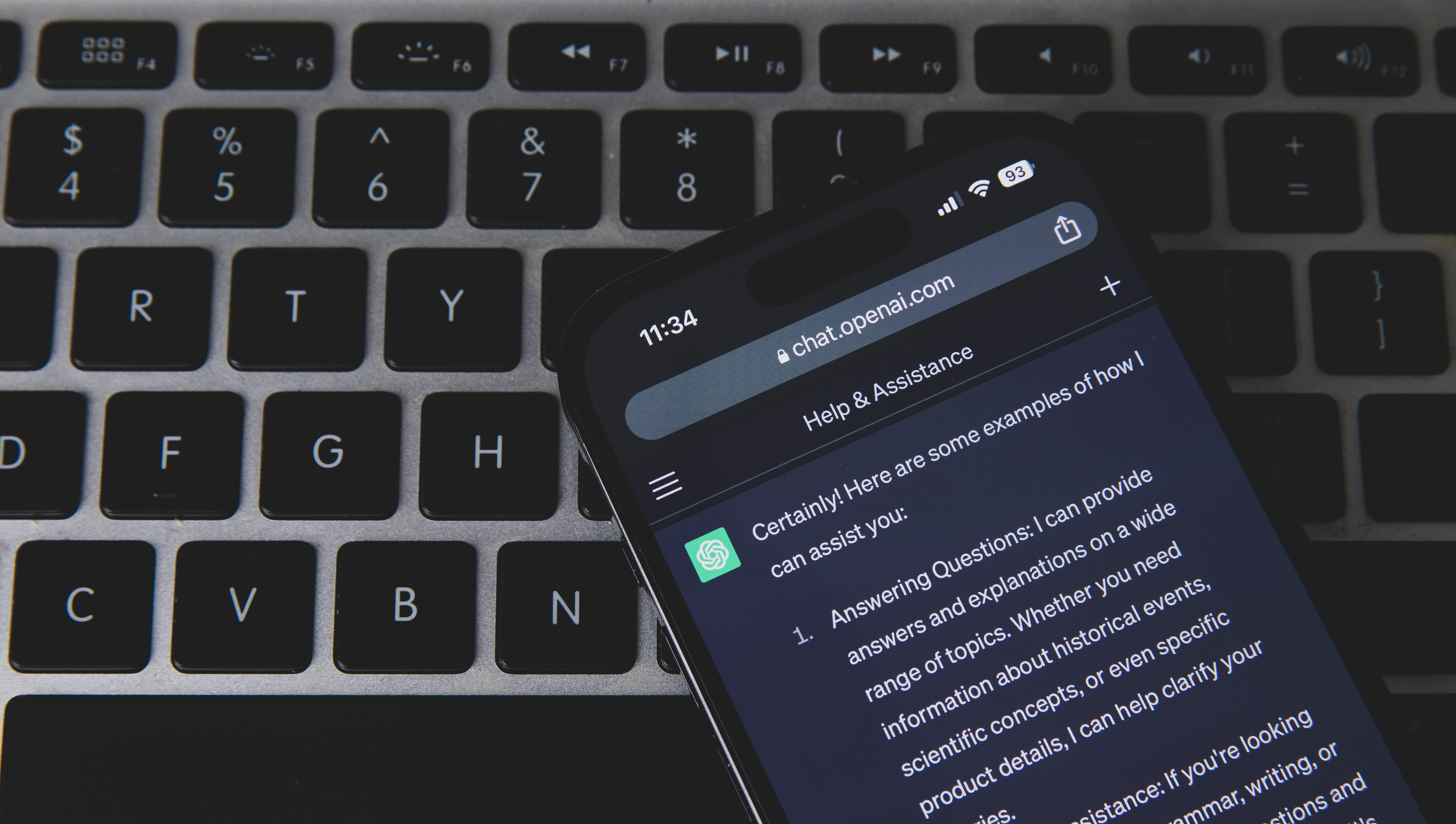
From top, then left to right:
- COVID-19, a disease caused by the coronavirus SARS-CoV-2, became a global pandemic in 2020 and shaped the early decade.
- The January 6 United States Capitol attack following the 2020 United States presidential election; the decade witnessed widespread democratic backsliding as many countries shifted from liberal democracy to authoritarianism.
- The July Uprising in Bangladesh was the world's first Gen Z revolution, as young protesters overthrow their governments in opposition to democratic backsliding, political corruption, and authoritarianism.
- In 2026, the crewed moon flyby mission Artemis II broke the record for the furthest humans have been from Earth.
- Following the October 7 attacks in 2023 by the militant group Hamas, Israel has invaded the Gaza Strip; during the invasion, the Israeli military has committed many war crimes and a genocide which has sparked protests worldwide; the war has spilled over throughout the Middle East.
- Russia launched a full scale invasion of Ukraine in 2022, starting a new phase of the Russo-Ukrainian war, Europe's largest and deadliest armed conflict since World War II.
- The 2020s have seen rapid growth in the field of artificial intelligence (AI), with the widescale introduction of generative AI tools like chatbots, notably ChatGPT.

The 2020s (pronounced "twenty-twenties" or "two thousand (and) twenties") is the current decade that began on 1 January 2020 and will end on 31 December 2029.

The COVID-19 pandemic and its aftermath marked the early 2020s, which triggered a global economic recession, sustained rise in global inflation, supply chain crisis, and autocratisation. Governments worldwide issued stay-at-home orders during the early pandemic, leading to a widespread use of teleconferencing, online learning, e-commerce, and food delivery services.

In politics, the 2020s has seen a rise in populist and anti-establishment movements across the world on both the left and right sides of the political spectrum, along with anti-government demonstrations and revolts, including the Gen Z protests. The decade saw an escalation of military conflicts, including the Russian invasion of Ukraine since 2022, the Gaza war and genocide since 2023, the 2025 Twelve-Day War, and the 2026 Iran war. By the middle of the decade, multiple journalists, economists, and political scientists had increasingly begun to refer to China as a superpower due to its enormous influence in the fields of geopolitics, technology, manufacturing, economics and culture.

Technology has continued to evolve in the 2020s. With the release of DALL-E and ChatGPT in 2021 and 2022, generative artificial intelligence applications became widespread, allowing users to instantly generate sophisticated text, images, and media, as well as igniting a backlash against AI-generated content, or "AI slop". The growth of cryptocurrencies and artificial intelligence has led to the cryptocurrency bubble and AI spring. India and China expanded their space exploration programs, with China assembling its space station Tiangong in 2022. The United States has led space exploration, including with the Artemis II crewed lunar flyby in 2026. Both the U.S. and China have vowed to return humans to the lunar surface by 2030.

During the early part of this decade, the world population grew from 7.7 billion people to ~8 billion people. In 2023, India overtook China as the most populous country in the world. With multiple extreme weather events and ecological crises continuing to escalate, several world leaders have called the 2020s the "decisive decade" for climate action.

== Politics and wars ==
The world map of CSTO and NATO member states with disputed regions in 2020s: NATO allies (blue), disputed regions (Yellow) and CSTO allies (red)

=== Major conflicts ===
The prominent wars of the decade include:

==== International wars ====
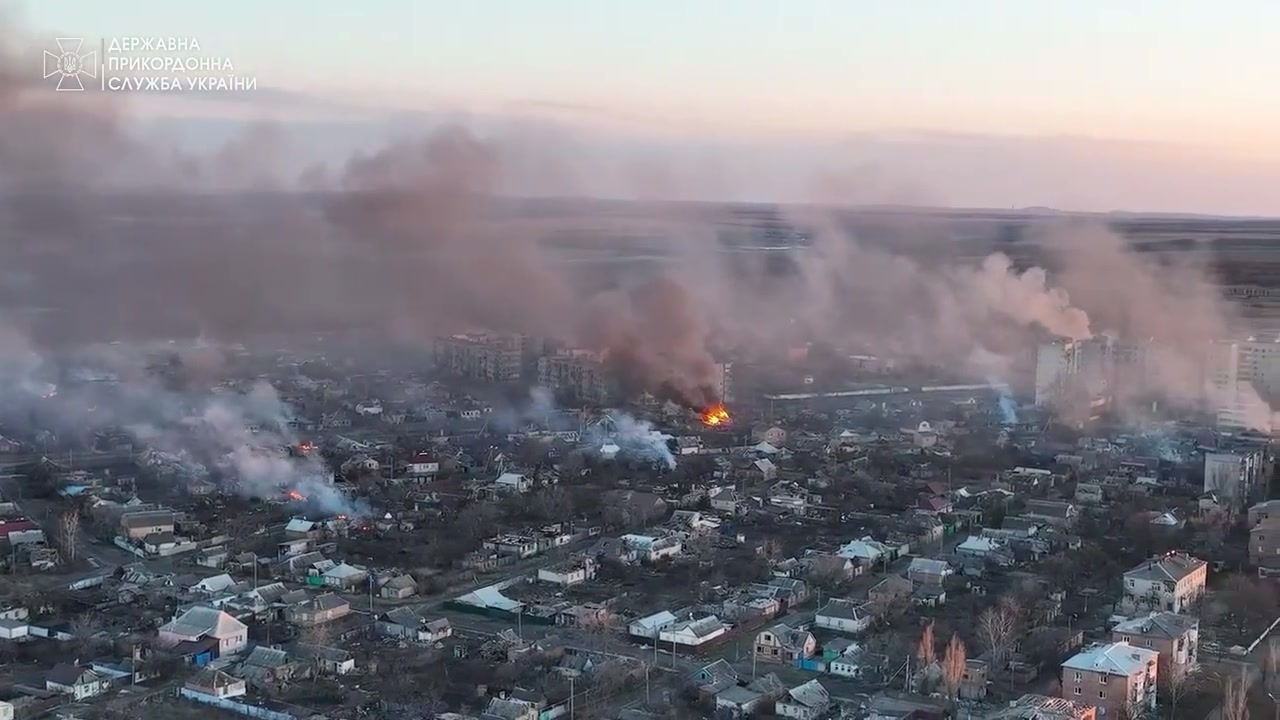
View of the Battle of Bakhmut during the Russian invasion of Ukraine

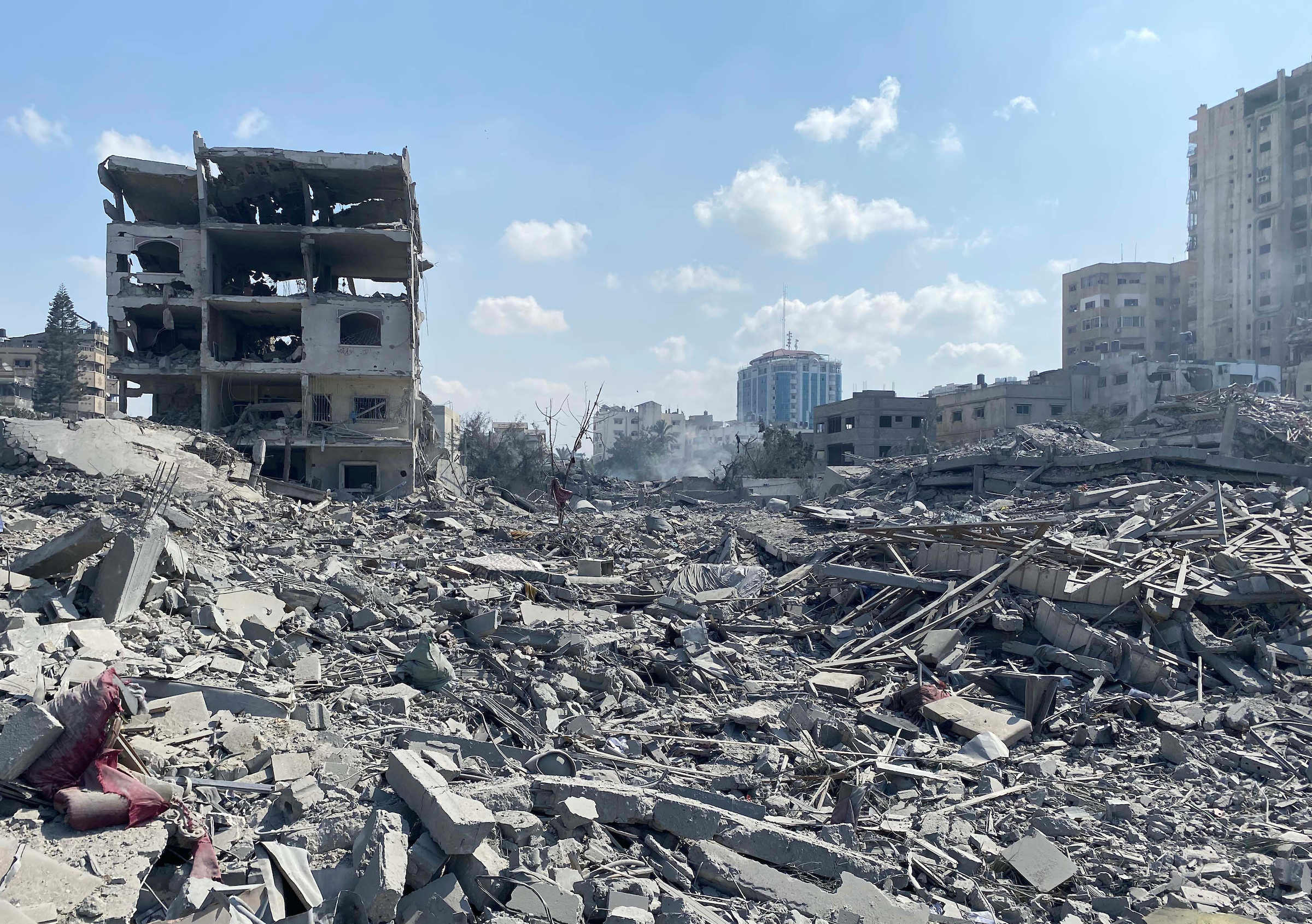
Destruction in Rimal following an Israeli airstrike during the Gaza war

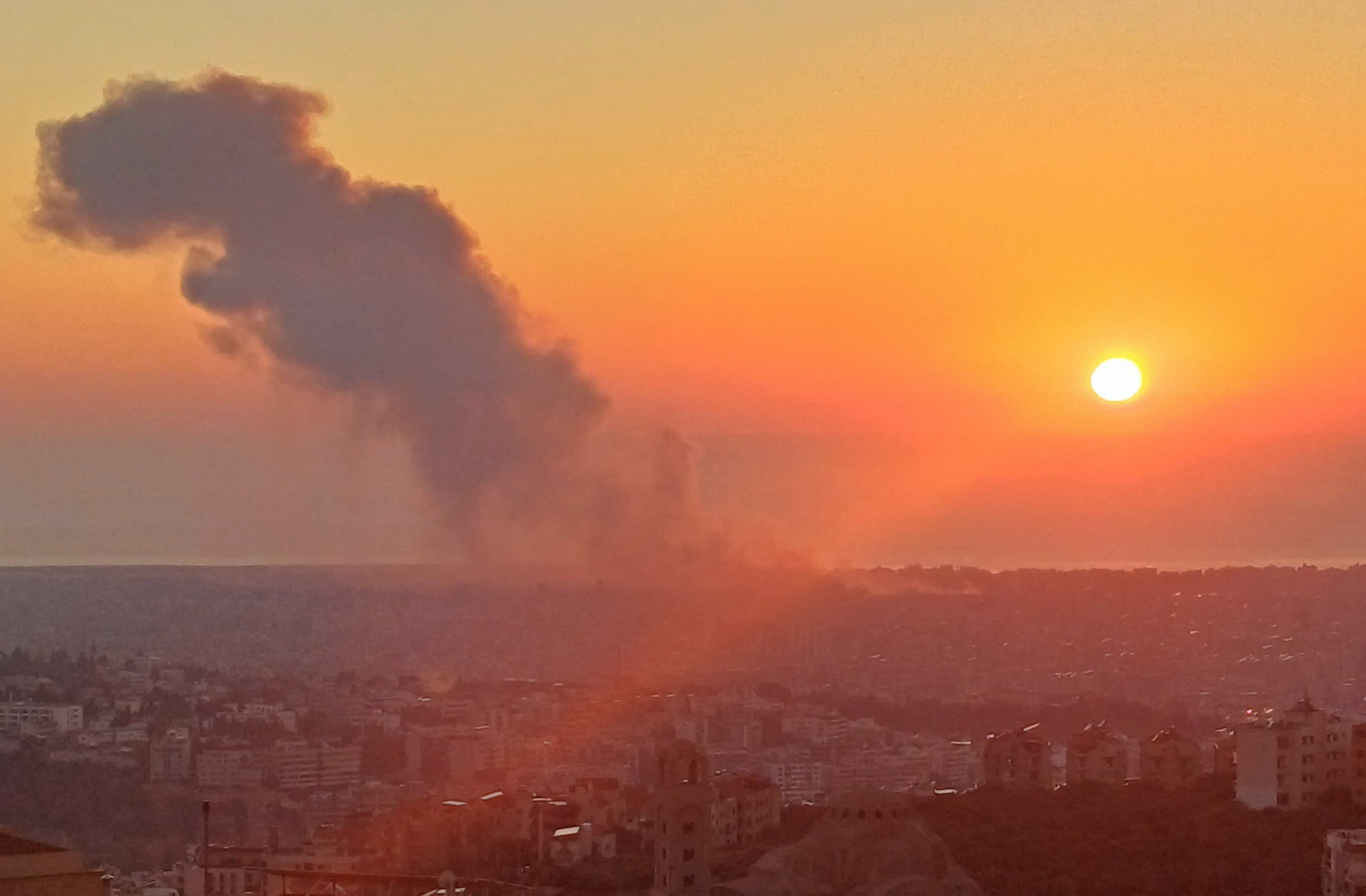
Rising smoke in Beirut following an Israeli airstrike that assassinated Hezbollah leader Hassan Nasrallah during the Hezbollah–Israel conflict (2023–present)

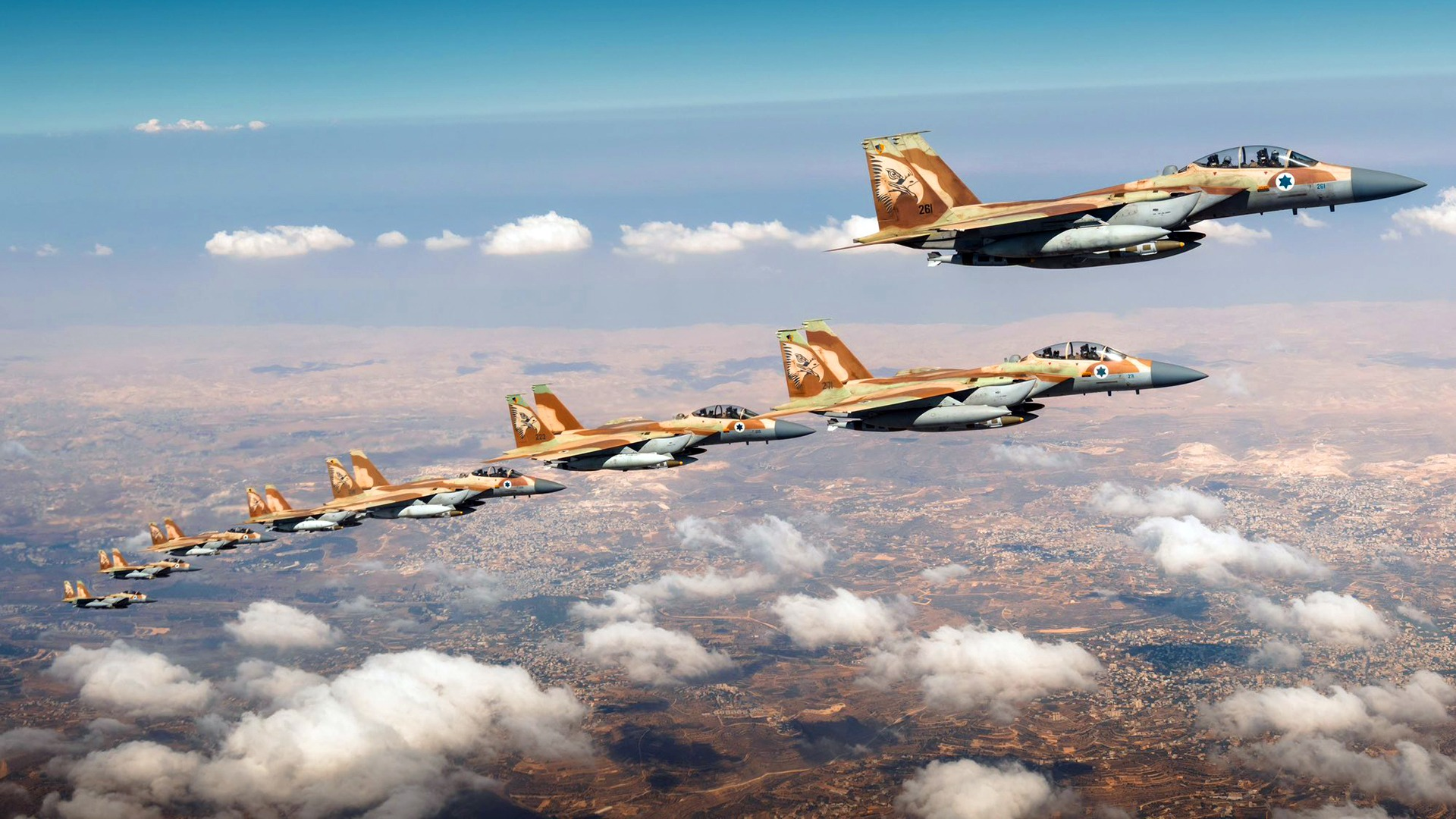
Israeli air force jets flying over Iran during the Twelve Day War

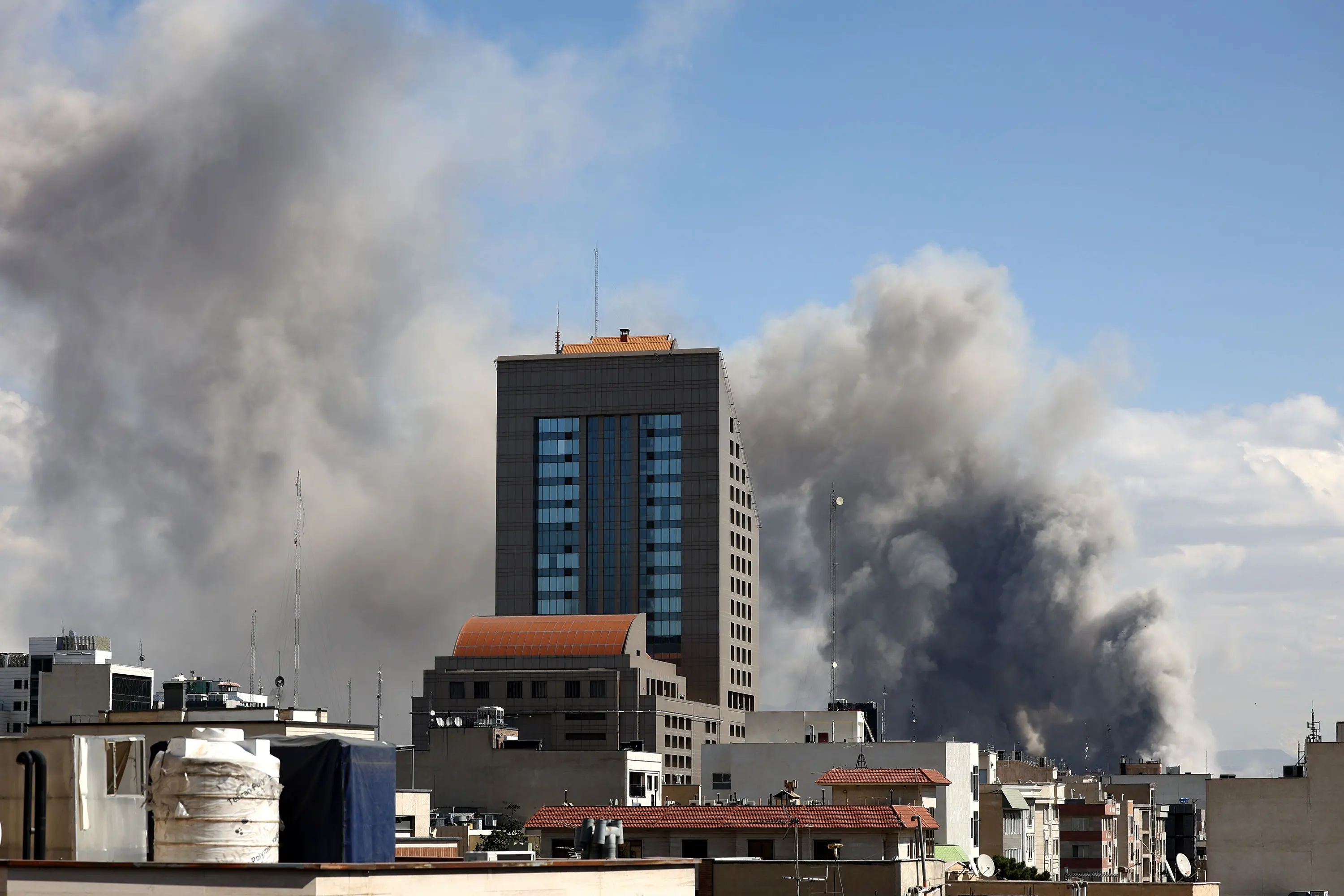
Smoke rising in Tehran during the 2026 Iran war

Name	Start date	End date	Description
Israeli–Palestinian conflict: 2021 Israel–Palestine crisis; Middle Eastern crisis (2023–present); Gaza war; Gaza genocide; Red Sea crisis; Israeli invasion of Lebanon; Israeli invasion of Syria; Iran–Israel war; 2026 Iran war and Afghanistan–Iran proxy war; Ongoing	Late 19th or early 20th century: 6 May 2021; 7 October 2023; 7 October 2023; 19 October 2023; 1 October 2024; 8 December 2024; 13 June 2025; March 2026	Ongoing: 21 May 2021; Ongoing; Ongoing; Ongoing; 27 November 2024; Ongoing; 24 June 2025; Ongoing	The Israeli–Palestinian conflict, which began in the late 19th or early 20th century, erupted into 11 days of open violence in May 2021 after the attempted eviction of Palestinians in the West Bank by Israeli settlers and an Israeli police raid on Al-Aqsa Mosque, with leading militant group Hamas launching over 4,000 rockets into Israel. The subsequent unrest caused extensive damage primarily, but not entirely, to Palestinians. The outbreak ended on 19 May. On 7 October 2023, Hamas and other Gazan militant groups conducted an armed attack on Israel, killing 797 civilians and taking 251 hostages back into Gaza. The subsequent war between Israel and Hamas has resulted in more than 50,000 casualties as of 2024, more than all the preceding decades of the conflict combined. After weakening Iranian proxies and the fall of the Assad regime, Israel launched a series of strikes against Iranian nuclear facilities, nuclear scientists and IRGC leadership. Iran retaliated by launching ballistic missiles against Israel. The United States temporarily joined the war by attacking Iranian nuclear facilities. Tensions between Iran and the United States have intensified amid Iran's ongoing crackdown on nationwide protests against the Iranian government. On 13 January, Iranian officials warned they were "ready for war" after United States president Donald Trump threatened potential military action ostensibly in response to the growing death toll and mass detentions linked to the protests. On 28 February 2026, the United States and Israel conducted military strikes in Iran. Several Iranian leaders are said to be hit in the strikes, including the assassination of Ali Khamenei, which is said to be cut off from contact. Along with the NATO allies plans to prepare in a following month after the assassination and Iranian airstrike threats. The NATO and Asian allies declared and launched the Afghanistan–Iran proxy war against the Taliban and the Islamic Republic regimes since the assassination of Ali Larijani, the war that blamed the massacre of the protesters and several terrorist attacks in the Middle East and South Asia (including India).
Turkey–PKK conflict	27 November 1978	12 May 2025	Numerous Kurdish groups, including the Kurdistan Workers' Party (the PKK) have fought for an independent Kurdistan incorporating parts of Turkey. In 2020, Turkey launched an insurgency in Iraqi Kurdistan. After a rebel offensive overthrew the regime of Syrian president Bashar al-Assad, Turkey renewed its offensive against Kurdish-held territories in Northern Syria. On 12 May 2025, the PKK announced its full dissolution to favour political means.
Nagorno-Karabakh conflict: Second Nagorno-Karabakh War; 2023 Azerbaijani offensive	February 1988: 27 September 2020; 19 September 2023	1 January 2024: 10 November 2020; 20 September 2023	The region of Nagorno-Karabakh has been disputed between the governments of Armenia and Azerbaijan, as well as the breakaway state, the Republic of Artsakh. Following the first war's ceasefire cross-border skirmishes persisted including in July 2020, when a series of border skirmishes left at least 15 dead. A second war broke out later that year and ended after another ceasefire. A border crisis and blockade ensued until a 2023 offensive into the region by Azerbaijan. Artsakh dissolved on 1 January 2024, ending the conflict.
War on terror: War in Afghanistan; Iraq conflict	11 September 2001: 7 October 2001; 20 March 2003	Ongoing: 30 August 2021; Ongoing	Motivated by the 9/11 attacks, the United States and other governments started a large scale effort to eliminate terrorism. With support from NATO, the United States invaded Taliban-controlled Afghanistan and overthrew the government; however, US forces remained in the country to stabilise the situation. Two years later, on the pretext that the government of Saddam Hussein had weapons of mass destruction, the United States and a coalition of partners invaded Iraq and overthrew Hussein's regime, after which the US occupied the country, officially leaving in 2011. However, insurgencies remained active in both countries, long after the invasions.
Kivu conflict: Congo–Rwanda conflict (2022–2025)	2 June 2004: 27 March 2022	Ongoing: 27 June 2025	The Kivu conflict began in 2004 in the eastern Congo as an armed conflict between the military of the Democratic Republic of the Congo (FARDC) and the Hutu Power group Democratic Forces for the Liberation of Rwanda (FDLR) in the Democratic Republic of the Congo. It has broadly consisted of three phases, the third of which is an ongoing conflict.
Syrian civil war: 2024 Syrian opposition offensives	15 March 2011: 27 November 2024	Ongoing: 8 December 2024	In March 2011, popular discontent with the rule of Bashar al-Assad triggered large-scale protests and pro-democracy rallies across Syria, as part of the wider Arab Spring protests in the region. After months of crackdown by the government's security apparatus, various armed rebel groups such as the Free Syrian Army began forming across the country, marking the beginning of the Syrian Insurgency. By mid-2012, the insurgency had escalated into a full-blown civil war until the fall of the Assad regime in December 2024, following major offensives led by the Syrian opposition. During the civil war, Turkey invaded parts of northern Syria to combat the Islamic State, Syrian Democratic Forces, and the PKK.
Russo-Ukrainian war: 2022 Russian invasion of Ukraine	20 February 2014: 24 February 2022	Ongoing: Ongoing	Hostilities between the Ukrainian government and Russia-backed separatist forces in Eastern Ukraine have been ongoing since the Russian annexation of Crimea in 2014. In 2021 and early 2022, tensions escalated between the two countries due to a build up of Russian troops on the Ukrainian border. Russia launched the 2022 Russian invasion of Ukraine in February 2022.
War against ISIS	13 June 2014	Ongoing	In late-2013, a terrorist organisation called ISIS began making rapid advances and territorial gains in Iraq and Syria. It captured Mosul in June and made Raqqa its capital. Various international coalitions were formed to help fight the militants. By December 2017, ISIS had lost much of its former territory.
Saudi Arabian–led intervention in Yemen	26 March 2015	Ongoing	During the Yemeni civil war, Saudi Arabia, the United Arab Emirates, and other countries part of a coalition invaded parts of Yemen to depose the Houthi-controlled government.
Afghanistan–Pakistan clashes (2024–present): 2026 Afghanistan–Pakistan War	March 2024–present: 22 February 2026–present	Ongoing: 3 November 2022; Ongoing	Clashes in the Durand Line began with growing hostilities at the border, which Pakistan blamed on the Taliban of Afghanistan and several terrorist incidents. Afghanistan launched a retaliatory operation against Pakistan. In response, Pakistan launched Operation Ghazab Lil Haq against the Taliban and announced a state of "open war" with Afghanistan after conducted airstrikes over the provinces of Nangarhar, Paktika and Khost.

==== Civil wars ====
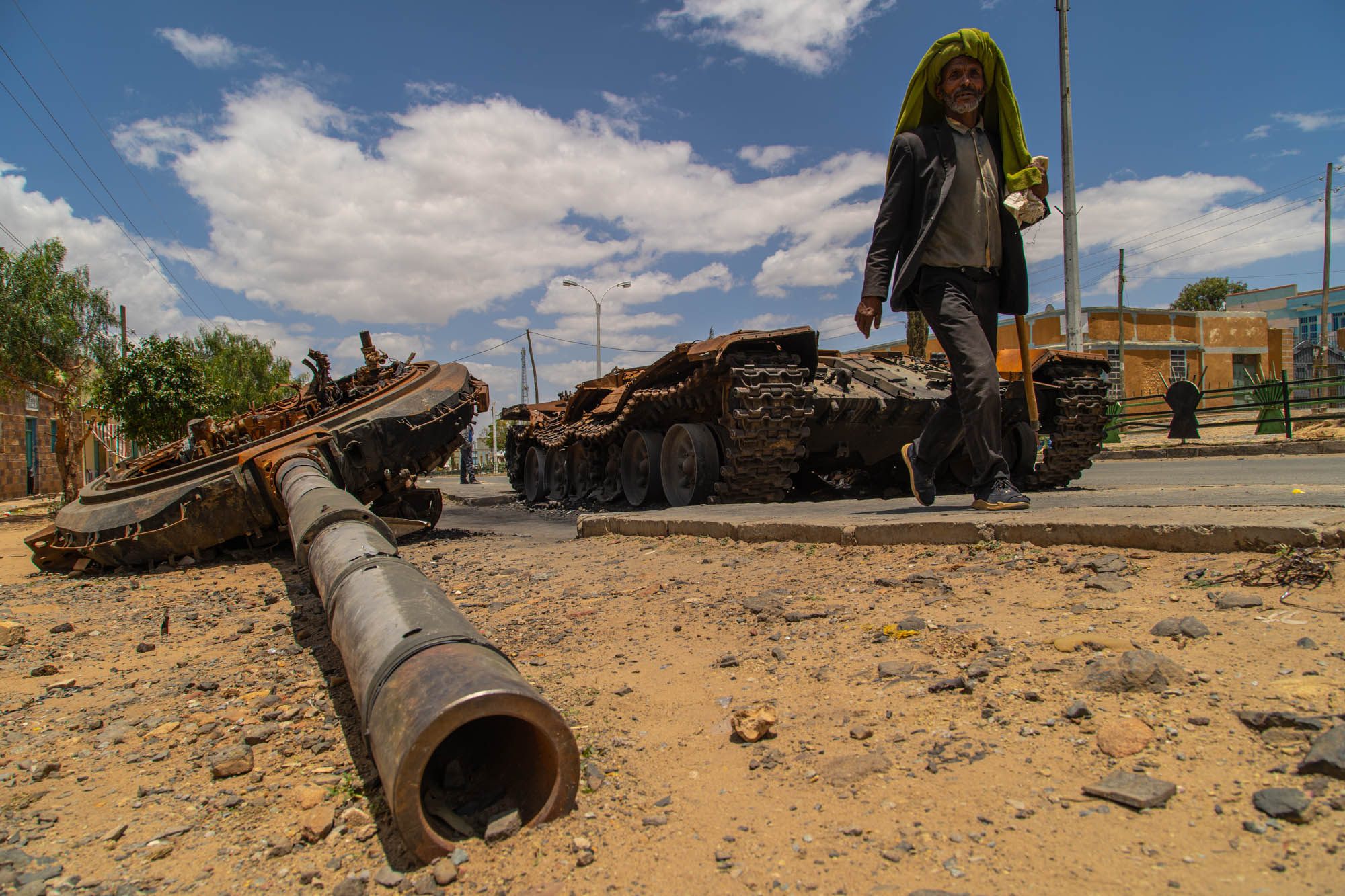
A man passing by a destroyed T-72 during the Tigray war

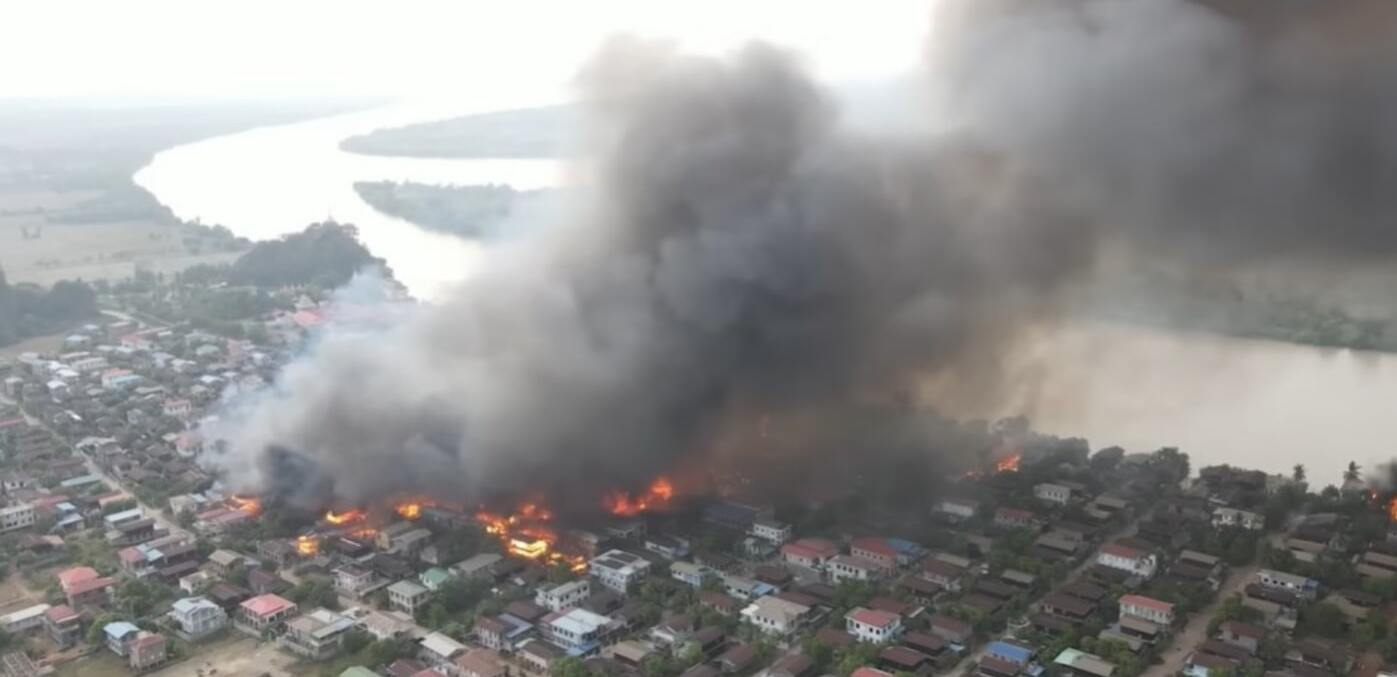
Kyaikmaraw township bombed by the SAC during the Myanmar civil war

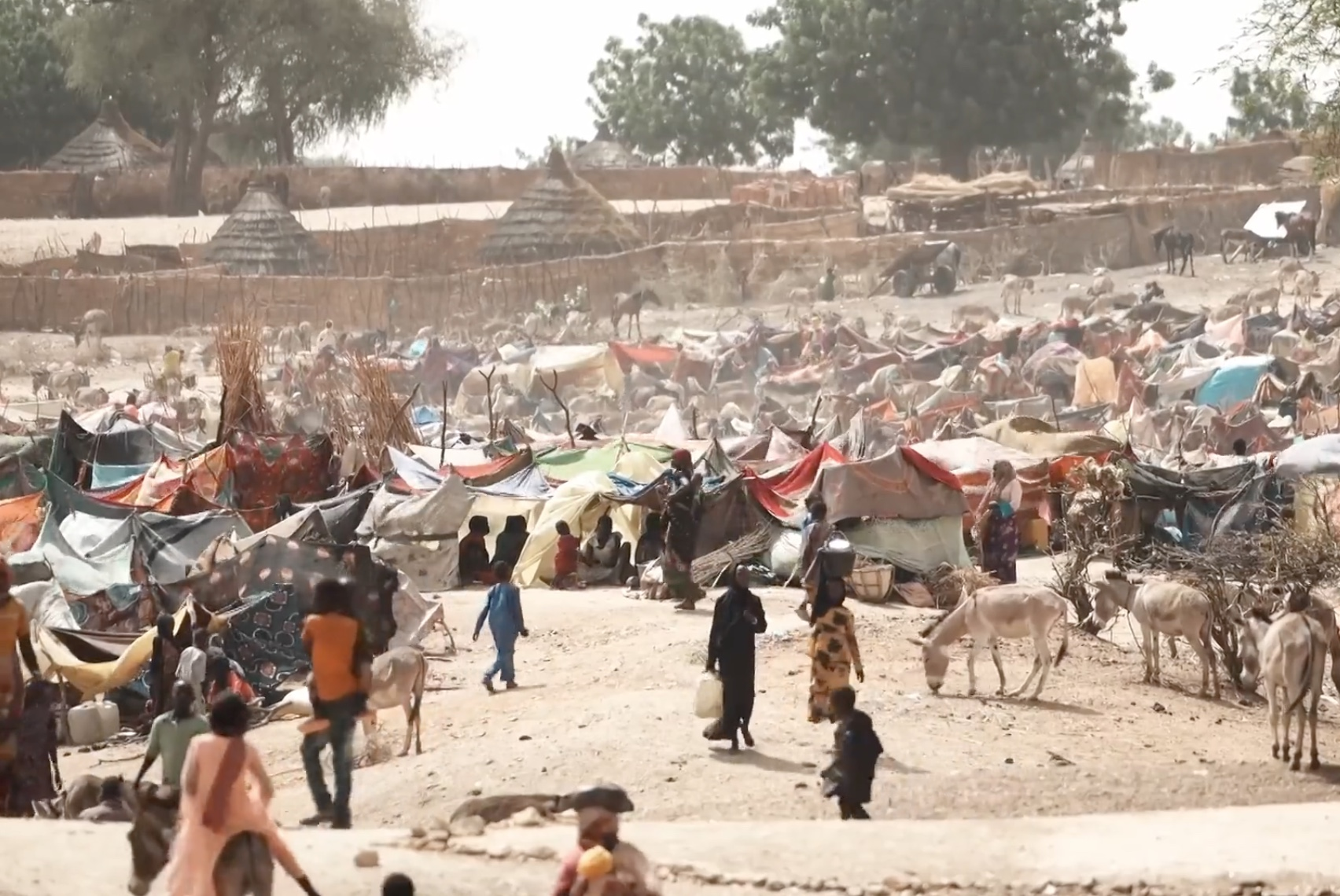
Sudanese refugee camp in Chad caused by the Sudanese civil war

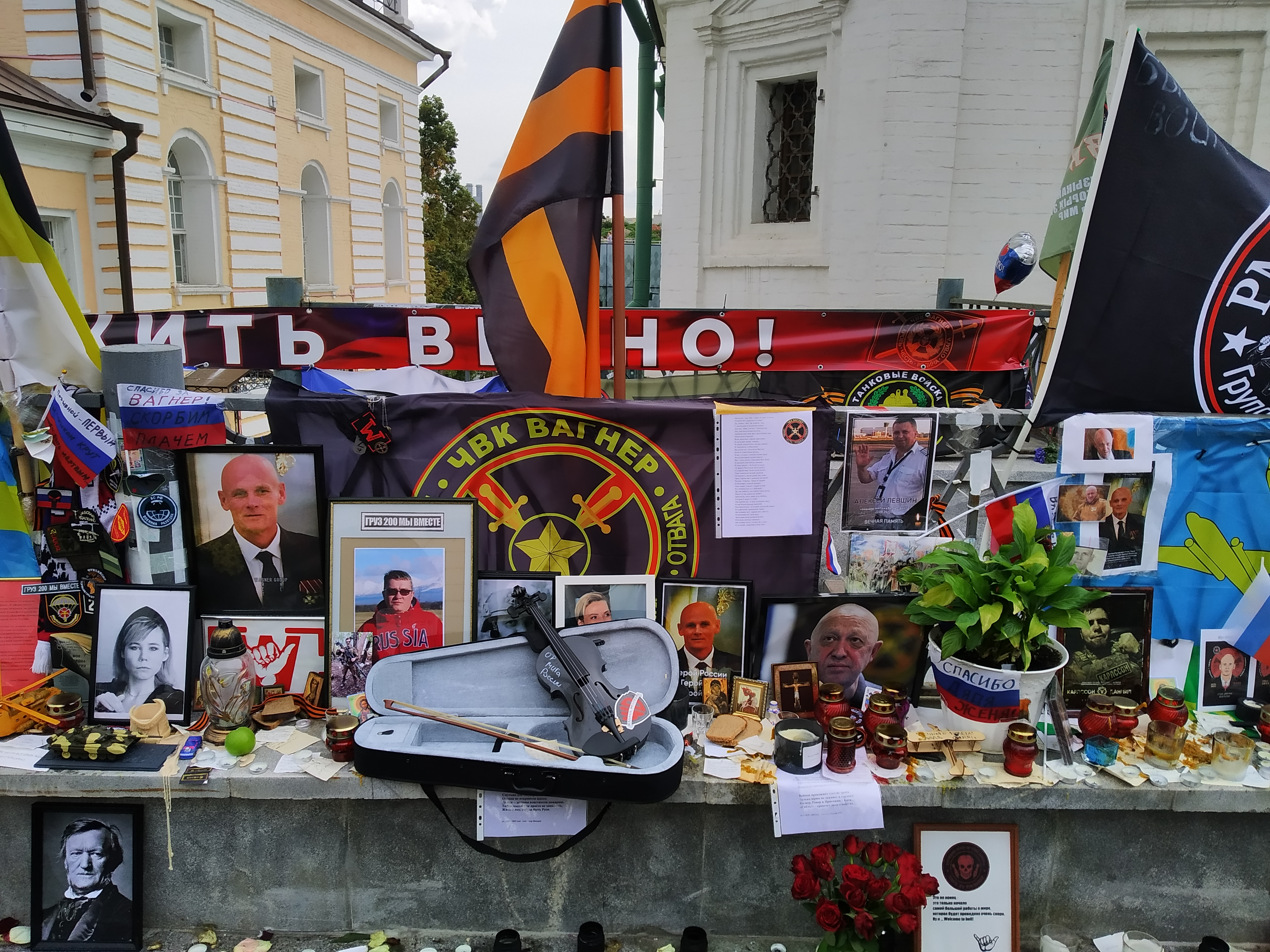
A memorial to leaders of the Wagner Group, who died in a plane crash two months after the Wagner Group rebellion

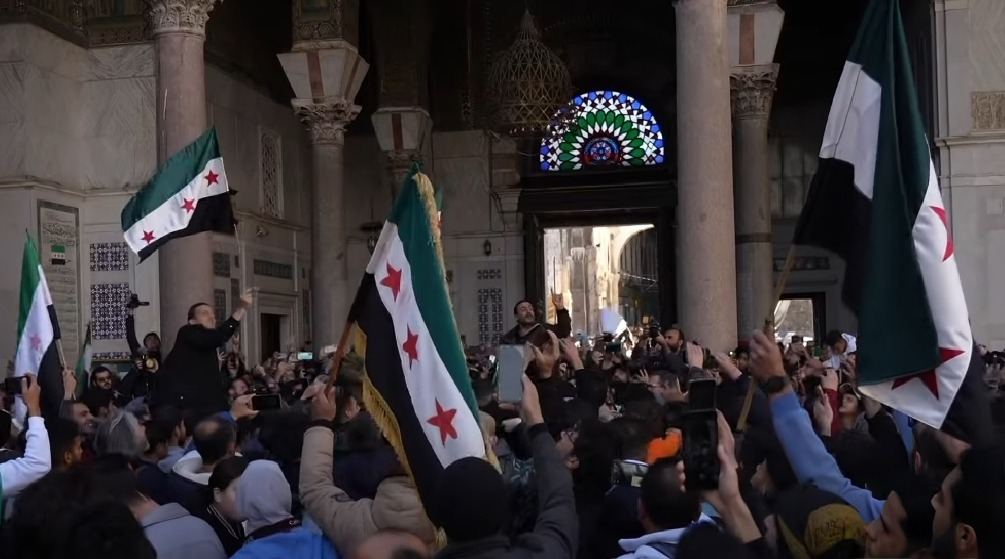
Syrians celebrating the Fall of the Assad Regime following the 2024 Syrian opposition offensives

Name	Start date	End date	Description
Myanmar conflict: Myanmar civil war	2 April 1948: 7 September 2021	Ongoing: Ongoing	Myanmar's long-running insurgencies escalated significantly into a major civil war in 2021 following the 2021 military coup and the subsequent brutal crackdown on the anti-coup protests.
War in Darfur	26 February 2003	31 August 2020	A peace agreement was signed on 31 August 2020 between the Sudanese authorities and several rebel factions to end armed hostilities.
Mexican drug war	11 December 2006	Ongoing	Following a rise in criminal violence as a result of drug trafficking in the country, Mexican president Felipe Calderón declared a war on drugs in December 2006. Since the start of the war, the death toll from drug violence had sharply increased. Arrests of key cartel leaders led to increasing violence as cartels fought for control of trafficking routes into the United States.
Somali civil war: 2023 Las Anod conflict	31 January 2009: 6 February 2023	Ongoing: Ongoing	In 2009, Al-Shabaab, an Islamist militant group, began waging an insurgency against the newly formed Transitional Federal Government. In 2011, the federal government captured Mogadishu and subsequently retook several towns across the country. Since then, the government has attempted to clean out the remaining Al-Shabaab strongholds with help from AMISOM soldiers.
Mali War	16 January 2012	Ongoing	In January 2012, a rebellion by Tuaregs in Northern Mali began. After Malian president Amadou Toumani Touré was ousted in a coup d'état, Tuaregs captured Northern Mali, and declared it to be the independent state of Azawad. However, shortly afterward, various Islamist groups took over Northern Mali from the Tuaregs and imposed sharia law on the region.
South Sudanese Civil War	15 December 2013	22 February 2020	On 22 February 2020, rivals Kiir and Machar struck a unity deal and formed a coalition government, after an estimated 400,000 deaths and more than 4 million people displaced by the war.
Libyan civil war	16 May 2014	23 October 2020	Following the factional violence that engulfed Libya after the fall of Muammar al-Gaddafi, a second civil war broke out among rival factions seeking control of the territory and oil of Libya. The conflict at the beginning was mostly between the House of Representatives (HoR) government that was controversially elected in 2014, also known as the "Tobruk government"; and the rival General National Congress (GNC) government, also called the "National Salvation Government", based in the capital Tripoli, established after Operation Odyssey Dawn and the failed military coup.
Yemeni civil war	16 September 2014	Ongoing	Preceded by a decade-long Houthi insurgency, the Yemeni Civil War began between two factions: the then-incumbent Yemeni government, led by Abdrabbuh Mansur Hadi, and the Houthi militia, along with their supporters and allies. Both claim to constitute the Yemeni government.
Philippine drug war	30 June 2016	Ongoing	Following a rise in political and criminal violence as a result of drug trafficking in the country, the Philippines has been engaged in a drug war and escalating terrorism since Philippine President Rodrigo Duterte was inaugurated on 30 June 2016. It had caused more than 5,000 deaths and over 150,000 arrests by the beginning of the decade.
Iraqi insurgency	9 December 2017	Ongoing	A part of the larger Iraqi conflict that has been waged since 2003, the Islamic State of Iraq and the Levant has been engaged in an insurgency against the Iraqi government and CJTF-OIR since the loss of territorial control in the Iraqi Civil War in 2017.
Ethiopian civil conflict: Tigray War; War in Amhara	2 April 2018: 3 November 2020; 9 April 2023	Ongoing: 3 November 2022; Ongoing	After years of increased tensions between the Tigray People's Liberation Front (TPLF) and the Ethiopian and Eritrean governments, a full-scale war broke out in November 2020, that has killed an estimated 300,000–500,000 people as of March 2022. On 2 November, both the Ethiopian government and TPLF formally agreed to a cessation of hostilities and systematic, verifiable disarmament though Tigrayan authorities allege that Ethiopia continued to launch attacks after the peace deal was signed
Sudanese civil war	15 April 2023	Ongoing	In April 2023, clashes broke out in western Sudan between rival factions of the military government of Sudan. The conflict began with the paramilitary Rapid Support Forces (RSF) launching attacks on key government sites. As of 23 April 2023, both RSF leader Mohamed Hamdan Dagalo and Sudan's de facto leader and army chief Abdel Fattah al-Burhan have claimed control over several key government sites, including the general military headquarters, the Presidential Palace, Khartoum International Airport, Burhan's official residence, and the SNBC headquarters.
Wagner Group rebellion	23 June 2023	24 June 2023	On 23 June 2023, Wagner Group leader Yevgeny Prigozhin led a "March for Justice" against the Russian government for a supposed attack on his men by the military. A day later however, as his convoy was encroaching on Moscow, Prigozhin called off the rebellion in exchange for amnesty and other unknown reasons.
Operation Southern Spear	2 September 2025	Ongoing	The US military and surveillance campaign with the goal of "detecting, disrupting, and degrading transnational criminal and illicit maritime networks" according to the administration of US president Donald Trump. Some analysts have identified the operation as a hybridisation of the war on terror and the war on drugs, and others have claimed that removal of Nicolás Maduro from power in Venezuela was an objective of the operation.

=== Revolutions and major protests ===
Successful revolutions and otherwise major protests of the decade include, but are not limited to:

Event	Date	Country	Events	Ref.
Dutch farmers' protests	1 October 2019–present	Netherlands	Demonstrations by Dutch farmers, characterised by the use of tractors to block roads, and occupy public spaces. The protests were triggered in October 2019 by a proposal in parliament to halve the country's livestock in an attempt to limit agricultural pollution. It was related to the Dutch nitrogen crisis. The farmers' protests combines action groups and an amalgamation of larger goals. Also, the party Farmer–Citizen Movement was founded, which has gained power in parliament.	
Indonesia omnibus law protests	13 January – November 2020	Indonesia	Mass popular protests and riots against the deliberation and passage of the controversial Omnibus Law on Job Creation, which was passed on 5 October 2020. The wider policies of President Joko Widodo were also protested against, and resulted in the formation of the new Labour Party.	
2020–2021 Belarusian protests	24 January 2020 – 25 March 2021	Belarus	Mass popular protests and riots against the Belarusian government and President Alexander Lukashenko. The largest anti-government protests in the history of Belarus, the demonstrations began in the lead-up to and during the 2020 presidential election, in which Lukashenko sought his sixth term in office.	
George Floyd protests	26 May 2020 – 26 May 2021	United States	Protests and riots due to the murder of George Floyd spread throughout the United States with international protests in support. The stated goal was to end systemic racism and police brutality. Sporadic protests in response to racism and police brutality continued throughout the following years, while the street where Floyd was murdered is still under control by protesters.	
2020–2021 Thai protests	July 2020 – November 2021	Thailand	Mass popular protests and riots against the government of Prime Minister Prayut Chan-o-cha, the dissolution of the Future Forward Party, changes to the constitution in 2017, and the country's political landscape. Resulted in the detention of leading figures.	
2020–2021 Indian farmers' protest	9 August 2020 – 11 December 2021	India	Protests and riots against three farm acts that were passed by the Parliament of India in September 2020.	
2020 Kyrgyz Revolution	5–15 October 2020	Kyrgyzstan	On 5 October, protests began in Kyrgyzstan in response to the annulled parliamentary election, which protesters felt were unfair with allegations of vote-rigging. A day later, the parliamentary elections were annulled. 6 days later, on 12 October, president Sooronbay Jeenbekov announced a state of emergency. On 15 October, Jeenbekov finally resigned, making way for Sadyr Japarov, who was nominated by parliament on 14 October to be acting prime minister, as also acting president. Following the protests, Japarov was elected president on 10 January 2021, on the same day a referendum was held on the Kyrgyz government system, in which the Kyrgyz voted for a reintroduction of the presidential system. The new constitution, passed by the Supreme Council was approved by voters in another referendum on 11 April 2021. Finally, on 28 November 2021, new parliamentary elections took place.	
2020–21 United States election protests: United States Capitol attack	4 November 2020 – 11 April 2021: 6 January 2021	United States	Protests began in multiple cities in the United States following the 2020 United States presidential election between then-President Donald Trump and Democratic challenger Vice-President Joe Biden, held on 3 November 2020. On 6 January 2021, following the defeat of US president Donald Trump in the 2020 presidential election, a mob of his supporters attacked the United States Capitol Building in Washington, D.C.	
2021 Brazilian protests	15 January – December 2021	Brazil	President Bolsonaro's government's response to the COVID-19 pandemic culminated in mass popular protests and riots, with protests occurring in both support and opposition to the government and resulted in a failed impeachment attempt of Bolsonaro.	
Myanmar protests (2021–present)	2 February 2021–present	Myanmar	Protests triggered after the 2021 Myanmar coup d'état, during the ongoing internal conflict in Myanmar, and the Myanmar civil war.	
2021–2022 Iranian protests: Mahsa Amini protests	15 July 2021 – 15 September 2022: 16 September 2022 – 2023	Iran	Throughout 2021 and 2022, crackdowns on the Iranian Democracy Movement, electricity blackouts, and economic conditions led to nationwide demonstrations, including protests over water scarcity as well as protests over food price hikes. The protests escalated rapidly in 2022 following the death of Mahsa Amini, a 22-year-old woman who was detained by the "morality police" for not wearing a hijab. The movement has led to a large government crackdown, a death toll over 500, and international condemnation for the government's response while also fuelling the ongoing anti-hijab movement in Iran and Iranian Democracy Movement.	
Canada convoy protest	22 January – 23 February 2022	Canada	A series of protests and blockades in Canada against COVID-19 mandates and restrictions, called the Freedom Convoy.	
Protests against the Russo-Ukrainian war: 2022 anti-war protests in Russia	24 February 2022–present	Russia	A series of protests and anti-war demonstrations held in Russia and worldwide against the 2022 Russian invasion of Ukraine and opposition to Vladimir Putin in Russia.	
2022 Sri Lankan protests	15 March – 14 November 2022	Sri Lanka	Starting in 2019, Sri Lanka had been facing its worst economic crisis since its independence. The then-ongoing crisis culminated in mass popular protests and riots against the incumbent government and the Rajapaksa family, which eventually forced President Gotabaya Rajapaksa to flee the country and resign in July. Prime Minister Ranil Wickremesinghe succeeded Rajapaksa as the president amidst the protests.	
Raging Years Movement: Resign Shigeru Ishiba rally	9 July 2022 – 22 October 2025	Japan	Anti-government protests and riots occurred after the assassination of Shinzo Abe, a controversial Unification Church ties to the LDP and the slush fund scandal, including the violent storming of the National Diet Building in Tokyo led by youth protesters and rioters, but it was dispersed by the Riot Police Unit and military forces. Other protests occurred since the 2024 Japanese general election, a controversial protest calls for the resignation of Prime Minister Shigeru Ishiba at the Expo 2025 site in Osaka. The Sanae Takaichi became the first female prime minister after the 2025 Liberal Democratic Party presidential election which resulted protests was ended, and the formation of the Liberal Democratic Party–Japan Innovation Party coalition.	
2022–2023 Brazilian election protests: 8 January Brasília attacks	31 October 2022 – 9 January 2023: 8 January 2023	Brazil	The 2022 Brazilian election protests began shortly after the conclusion of the 2022 Brazilian general election's second round on 30 October, in which Luiz Inácio Lula da Silva was elected president. Supporters of Jair Bolsonaro, the outgoing incumbent president, started blocking roads and highways in the country. At least 23 Brazilian states, plus the Federal District, recorded roadblocks as of 1 November, adding up to at least 267 roadblocks according to data from Federal Highway Police (PRF). Dozens of Bolsonaro supporters storm the Three Powers Plaza in the capital Brasília, cause enormous damage. President Lula was not there, nor was Bolsonaro or members of Congress.	
2022 COVID-19 protests in China	2 November – 5 December 2022	China	A series of protests against COVID-19 lockdowns began in mainland China on 15 November 2022. The protests began in response to measures taken by the Chinese government to prevent the spread of COVID-19 in the country, including implementing a zero-COVID policy. Discontentment towards the policy has grown since the beginning of the pandemic, which confined many people to their homes without work, leaving them unable to purchase daily necessities and subjecting them to harsh restrictions. Protests escalated on 24 November 2022 following a fire in an apartment building in Ürümqi which killed 10 people, with protesters blaming China's policies for the deaths.	
Peruvian protests (2022–2023)	7 December 2022 – 24 March 2023	Peru	Protests erupted against the government of Dina Boluarte and the Congress of Peru called by supporters of the ousted president of Peru, Pedro Castillo, organised by social organisations and indigenous peoples who felt they experienced political disenfranchisement, specifically on the politically left-wing to far left. The government's authoritarian response was widely criticised, with further discontent following the Supreme Court's decision to declare protesting in Peru to be illegal.	
July Uprising	10 December 2022 – 5 August 2024	Bangladesh	A series of anti-government protests against the authoritarian government were initiated by the Bangladeshi opposition parties in December 2022, the protests continued spite of the government crackdowns. Though initially low-level, with instances of vandalism in late 2023, the movement gained momentum in 2024. Initially focused on restructuring discriminatory traditional and quota-based systems for government job recruitment, the movement expanded against what many perceive as an authoritarian government when hundreds of protestors and civilians, most of whom were students, were killed. The protests resulted in the resignation of prime minister Sheikh Hasina after 15 years of rule.	
2023 Israeli judicial reform protests	7 January – 12 October 2023	Israel	Mass protests, strikes and civil disobedience campaigns occurred across the country in response to Prime Minister Benjamin Netanyahu's right wing government's plan to overhaul the Israeli Judiciary system, which have been criticised for removing the checks and balances on the government and giving it unrestrained power.	
2023 French pension reform strikes	19 January – 8 June 2023	France	A series of civil unrest incidents occurred in France in response to a pension reform bill proposed by the Borne government, which would increase the retirement age from 62 to 64 years old. Strikes and protests have led to widespread disruption, including garbage piling up in the streets and public transport cancellations. In March, the government used Article 49.3 of the constitution to force the bill through the French Parliament, sparking more protests and two failed no confidence votes.	
2023–2024 Georgian protests: 2024 Georgian post-election protests	6 – 10 March 2023: 28 October 2024–present	Georgia	A series of street demonstrations taking place throughout Georgia over parliamentary backing of a proposed "Law on Transparency of Foreign Influence", which requires NGOs to register as "agents of foreign influence" if the funds they receive from abroad amount to more than 20% of their total revenue. Police have been reported as using water cannons and tear gas to disperse the protests, especially in the capital Tbilisi. The parliament retracted the bill as a result of protests on 10 March 2023. Protests against the 2024 Georgian parliamentary election results began in Georgia after the preliminary official results were announced. The demonstrators claimed that the elections, which saw the ruling Georgian Dream win a majority of seats, were fraudulent, and alternatively demanded a recount and a new election. Additional protests were held on 4 November near the parliament building, where the opposition parties unveiled their strategy to tackle the election results. The protests continued on 17 November, when the final results were certified by the Central Election Commission of Georgia. The scope of the protests was broadened on 28 November, when the government announced that it would postpone the EU negotiations process until 2028. The protests are also called "Georgian Maidan".	
2023 Polish protests: 4 June protests; March of a Million Hearts	4 June – 1 October 2023: 4 June; 1 October 2023	Poland	Two big antigoverment demonstrations were held in Poland in 2023. The first major protest took place on 4 June under the name "March 4th June" ("Marsz 4 Czerwca"). It was organised by the main opposition party, Civic Coalition, mainly in opposition to the attempt to establish a State Commission to investigate Russian influence in the years 2007–2022, because this commission could ban people from holding public office without giving a reason, which was a thing aimed at Donald Tusk and the opposition by ruling Law and Justice. The march was organised on 4 June, the day commemorating the first partially free elections in Poland in 1989. The protest gathered between 300 000 and 500 000 people. The result of the protest was the submission of an amendment to the act by President Andrzej Duda, which was to soften the controversial provisions in the act. Additionally, thanks to the march, the opposition's popularity increased by about 5 percentage points. A second protest was held on 1 October under the name "March of a Million Hearts" ("Marsz Miliona Serc"), as a reminder of the first protest just before the parliamentary elections, that was held on 15 October. The protest was organised by democratic opposition (Civic Coalition, Third Way and New Left), and gathered between 600 000 to 1,100,000 people. This protest was one of the main reasons for the opposition's victory in the parliamentary elections.	
Gaza war protests	8 October 2023–present	Worldwide	A series of protests and anti-war demonstrations held worldwide, focused on a variety of issues related to the conflict, including demands for a ceasefire, an end to the Israeli blockade and occupation, return of Israeli hostages, protesting war crimes, ending US support for Israel and providing humanitarian aid to Gaza.	
2023–2024 European Union farmers' protests: 2024 French farmers' protests; 2024 Polish farmers' protests; 2023–2024 German farmers' protests	December 2023–present	EU: France; Poland; Germany	Series of farmers' protests were held across the European Union mostly due to opposing EU green politics, and unregulated trade of agricultural products with non-European Union member states, such as Ukraine and the Mercosur bloc.	
2024 Venezuelan protests	28 July 2024 – 10 January 2025	Venezuela	A series of protests erupted in response to the results of the 2024 presidential election, citing allegations of voter fraud and other irregularities during the election process. These events unfolded as part of the broader 2024 Venezuelan political crisis and occurred against the backdrop of the ongoing crisis in Venezuela. Demonstrations to uphold the results of the election, along with vigils for political prisoners, occurred worldwide after the July election. Spontaneous protests broke out immediately after the election, while later rallies were organised by the Venezuelan opposition. Maduro claimed the opposition was encouraging a coup and has charged demonstrators with terrorism, while initiating an unprecedented crackdown. Maduro's security forces have gone door-to-door seeking to arrest protesters, poll workers and members of the opposition in what Maduro has referred to as Operation Tun Tun, and armed bands of Maduro supporters known as colectivos have joined security forces in repressing dissent. As of 14 August 2024, at least 2,200 persons are reported to have been arrested, and 25 killed. Maduro has announced plans to continue to seek the arrest of dissenters, and to rehabilitate two prisons to house those detained.	
Southeast Europe protests: 2024–2026 Serbian anti-corruption protests; 2024–2025 Romanian election annulment protests; 2025 Turkish protests; 2025 Bulgarian budget protests; Flamingo Revolution	October 2024–present	EU: Bulgaria; Greece; Romania; Albania; North Macedonia; Serbia; Turkey	A series of anti-governmentprotests and riots against political corruption, retail boycotts, and various problems across Southeast Europe sparked by public anger over corruption, democratic backsliding, and tragic events, the protests are largely student-led and driven by younger generations demanding transparency and accountability.	
Protests against the second presidency of Donald Trump: 2025 "Hands Off" protests; No Kings protests; June 2025 Los Angeles protests against mass deportation; Global March for Dignity; Hands Off movement	January 2025–present	Worldwide	An ongoing series of protests against US president Donald Trump, Elon Musk, and the Trump administration, beginning on 5 April. Participants, including the involvement of over 150 advocacy groups, protested Trump's worldwide implementation of "Liberation Day" Tariffs which subsequently lead to the stock market crash, several other endeavours causing economic decline, Musk's cuts to government agencies and the federal government, rollback of LGBTQ rights in the United States, mass deportations of immigrants and legal citizens, potential negative effects to social security, and cuts to healthcare and related research. Protestors additionally expressed concern in policies favouring billionaires, growing authoritarianism in the Trump administration, and a decline in democracy. These protests are described as the largest nationwide display of opposition to the second Trump administration across Trump's presidential terms, being held at nationwide and worldwide.	
2025–2026 Indonesian protests: Dark Indonesia rally; Oust Prabowo Movement	February 2025 – ongoing	Indonesia	Public and student-led anti-government protests and riots are being held throughout several cities in Indonesia. They were launched starting on 17 February 2025 by the All-Indonesian Students' Union (BEM SI), together with individual students' unions against the alleged controversial policies of President Prabowo Subianto. It is the most violent protests and riots in the country since May 1998.	
2025 Thai anti-government protests	May 2025 – February 2026	Thailand	A renewed anti-government protests and riots across Thailand including Bangkok, over a controversial dual border crisis in Cambodia and Myanmar alongside its proposed military buildup funded by the Indian government, as well as the discontent of the Shinawatra family over political corruption. The opposition People's Party supporters and pro-democracy protesters attempted to storm the Thai parliament building while respecting the controversial major issues, and minor protests ended peacefully, resulted the Bhumjaithai Party victory at the 2026 Thai general election.	
2025–2026 Philippine anti-corruption protests	4 September 2025–present	Philippines	A series of widespread protests began in the Philippines, including Metro Manila. They involved several anti-corruption protests stemming from the ongoing flood control projects controversy that largely involved the Department of Public Works and Highways and the legislative branch of the Philippine government. Several cities and municipalities across different provinces also held local demonstrations.	
2025 Nepalese Gen Z protests	8–16 September 2025	Nepal	Large-scale protests and riots are taking place across Nepal, predominantly organised by Gen Z students and young citizens against government corruption which resulted the resignation of Prime Minister K. P. Sharma Oli and replaced by Sushila Karki was appointed as interim prime minister, as well as allegations of mismanagement of public funds and a state-terrorist designation.	
2025 Peruvian protests	20 September – 16 October 2025	Peru	Anti-government protests began in Peru against the unpopular administration of Dina Boluarte and the Congress of Peru. This followed the previous protests that occurred in 2022 and 2023 against the removal of her predecessor, Pedro Castillo; the protests part of the ongoing Peruvian political crisis and prelude to the 2026 Peruvian general election, which resulted the impeachment of Dina Boluarte in a following month.	
2025 Malagasy protests	25 September – 15 October 2025	Madagascar	Anti-government protests have occurred across Madagascar since September 2025, focused on the capital of Antananarivo. On 11 October, units of the Madagascar Armed Forces carried out a coup in support of the protests, which made president Andry Rajoelina flee the country and formation of a provisional military junta led by Colonel Michael Randrianirina.	
2025 Moroccan Gen Z protests	27 September 2025 – 18 October 2025	Morocco	A series of ongoing youth-led protests in Morocco demanded with significant improvements to public education and healthcare, while criticising government spending on international sporting events like the 2030 FIFA World Cup and the 2025 Africa Cup of Nations. They were the largest protests since the 2011–2012 Moroccan protests.	
2025 Mexican protests	2 November – 14 December 2025	Mexico	Large-scale protests against government corruption and a proposed martial law declaration over the Mexican drug war took place across Mexico following the assassination of Uruapan mayor Carlos Manzo. Protests were held in major cities across Mexico and varied in size and character, ranging from peaceful marches and vigils to incidents of vandalism and clashes with security forces.	
2025–2026 Iranian protests	28 December 2025 – 31 March 2026	Iran	Mass protests and riots erupted across multiple cities in Iran amid a deepening economic crisis and widespread dissatisfaction with the government. While initially sparked by frustration over skyrocketing inflation, rising food prices, and the severe depreciation of the Iranian rial, the protests quickly evolved into a broader movement demanding an end to the Islamic Republic's oppressive regime under Supreme Leader Ali Khamenei until his assassination during the 2026 Iran war, the movement quickly became the largest outbreak of unrest in Iran since the 2022–2023 protests following the death of Mahsa Amini.	
2026 Delhi Jantar Mantar protests	6 June – 25 July 2026	India	A series of student-led demonstrations took place in Jantar Mantar, New Delhi, India, between 6 June and 25 July 2026. They were initiated by the Cockroach Janta Party (CJP), an Indian youth-based satirical political movement, along with left-wing student organisations including the All India Students Federation, All India Students Association, and Students' Federation of India. Held primarily at Jantar Mantar in New Delhi, the protesters have demanded successfully the resignation of Union Education Minister Dharmendra Pradhan over irregularities in several of that year's national examinations — the 2026 NEET paper leak and the CBSE On-Screen Marking irregularities — along with broader reforms in the conduct of public examinations.	

=== Terrorist attacks ===
The most prominent terrorist attacks committed against civilian populations during the decade include, but are not limited to:

Event	Date	Country	Deaths	Injuries	Ref.
Koshebe massacre	28 November 2020	Nigeria	110	6	
2021 Kabul school bombing	8 May 2021	Afghanistan	90	240	
2021 Kabul airport attack	26 August 2021	Afghanistan	183	200+	
2022 Peshawar mosque attack	4 March 2022	Pakistan	64+	196+	
2022 Somali Ministry of Education bombings	29 October 2022	Somalia	121+	300+	
2023 Peshawar mosque bombing	30 January 2023	Pakistan	101	220+	
Re'im music festival massacre	7 October 2023	Israel	364	Unknown	
2024 Kerman bombings	3 January 2024	Iran	103	284	
Crocus City Hall attack	22 March 2024	Russia	145	551	
2024 Barsalogho attack	24 August 2024	Burkina Faso	600+	300+	
2024 Magdeburg car attack	20 December 2024	Germany	5	200+	
2025 New Orleans truck attack	1 January 2025	United States	14	59	
2025 Pahalgam attack	22 April 2025	India	26	20	
Annunciation Catholic Church shooting	27 August 2025	United States	3	21	
2025 Delhi car explosion	10 November 2025	India	16	20+	
2025 Islamabad suicide bombing	11 November 2025	Pakistan	15	38	
2025 Bondi Beach shooting	14 December 2025	Australia	16	42	
Jan–Feb 2026 Balochistan attacks	31 January 2026	Pakistan	200	—N/a	
2026 Islamabad mosque bombing	6 February 2026	Pakistan	32	170+	
July 2026 Balochistan attacks	4 July 2026	Pakistan	150+	—N/a	
2026 Berlin Pride attack	25 July 2026	Germany	1	29	
2026 Kohat attack

=== Political trends ===

The 2026 V-Dem Democracy Indices, the 2025 Economist Democracy Index, and the 2025 World Press Freedom Index by Reporters Without Borders (RSF)

The 2020s marked the end of the post-Cold War era, particularly in post-communist Eastern Europe, east of the former Iron Curtain. Pasokification marked the decline of centre-left and centre-right politics throughout the Western world during the decade, led by demographic changes such as increased tertiary education and ethnic diversity as well as the waning influence of religion and the rise of identity politics. At this time, centre-right parties drifted rightward towards libertarianism, right-wing populism, national conservatism, or were supplanted by new far-right parties. Centre-left politics has not declined to the same extent, although some have, most notably Joe Biden (particularly age and health concerns). Volodymyr Zelenskyy in Ukraine is also struggling, with the next Ukrainian presidential election indefinitely postponed due to the Russo-Ukrainian war.

A deep political divide has arisen in the United States, which has seen acute political polarisation, with stark divides along race and ethnicity, educational attainment, and political polarisation among states. The 2024 United States presidential election was decided by 1.5% (49.8–48.3%), a close race by popular vote margin. In 2024, Donald Trump defeated Kamala Harris after Harris previously defeated Trump in 2020 as the Vice-presidential candidate, in a quasi-rematch.

Western Europe, Canada, and Oceania (Australia and New Zealand) have largely avoided democratic backsliding and the rise of far-right politics, but even there political instability and polarisation has increased. Keir Starmer of the United Kingdom has seen his approval ratings fall precipitously, prompting his resignation in June 2026, and Emmanuel Macron of France has faced a French political crisis due to a hung parliament. However, in the 2025 Dutch general election the liberal Democrats 66 party won the most seats.

==== Gen Z protests ====
The Gen Z protests in Asia began in 2024, with the July Uprising in Bangladesh being described as the world's first Generation Z revolution. The 2026 Bangladeshi and Nepalese general elections held which resulted both landslide victories of liberal and reformist opposition parties, Bangladesh Nationalist Party and the Rastriya Swatantra Party, both the elections held since the chaotic Gen Z protests.

==== Conservative wave in Latin America ====
Starting in the 2020s saw Pasokification in Latin America, right-wing candidates rebounded with a handful of victories, constituting a conservative wave resurgence. Proponent figures such as Javier Milei of Argentina, Daniel Noboa of Ecuador, Rodrigo Paz of Bolivia, J. A. Kast of Chile, Laura Fernández of Costa Rica, Nasry Asfura of Honduras, Keiko Fujimori of Peru, and Abelardo de la Espriella of Colombia. The phenomenon which led to the establishment of the Shield of the Americas by US president Donald Trump, maintaining foreign relations of Israel, and better right-wing conservative partnership.

==== Political economic trends ====
The 2021-2023 inflation surge discredited or weakened nearly all governing parties and leaders during the early 2020s, across ideological lines. In 2025, Trump triggered a global trade war, repudiating neoliberalism and free trade, in favour of mercantilism and protectionism. This was a sea change in Republican Party ideology, raising tariffs to the highest levels since the Smoot–Hawley Tariff Act of 1930.

Despite being a capitalist country, the relationship between income and voter support in the United States inverted in 2024, because of educational polarisation. Kamala Harris won voters making over $100,000 and $200,000 a year, but lost the election. Similar trends have occurred in Canada and the United Kingdom, as centre-left parties lose the support of those without college degrees, including many with lower incomes. The right-wing populist Reform UK party has attracted lower-income voters who tend to be older, did not graduate from university, and male. As early as 2018, French economist Thomas Piketty had predicted that centre-left parties would come to represent women, the highly educated and high-income, and ethnic minorities, instead of those with low incomes. Kamala Harris's strongest voters were women with graduate degrees and Black women, herself a Black woman with a Juris Doctor.

The Republican Party's core demographics changed to becoming a party primarily of men without college degrees, including Hispanic men. The Democratic Party's core demographics changed to becoming a party primarily of women with college degrees and Black women. Hispanic men voted to the right of White women in 2024. Women without college degrees and men with college degrees were both fairly evenly split.

Former communist countries, particularly in the former Eastern Bloc, have pivoted towards national conservatism and far-right politics. This includes Russia itself under the authoritarian dictatorship of Vladimir Putin. Putin launched the 2022 Russian invasion of Ukraine with irredentist and Putinist motives. The Russo-Ukrainian war (2022–present) represents the deadliest war in Eastern Europe since the Eastern Front of World War II and the Russian Civil War. But the trend was broader, also including Viktor Orbán in Hungary, the Law and Justice party in Poland, and the far-right Alternative for Germany party, which is strongest in the New states of Germany that once comprised East Germany.

==== Electoral trends ====
Having suffered decline in the years after the Great Recession, the centre-left politics and the 1990s political model (like progressivism, liberalism, and social democracy policies) experienced a resurgence across Europe and the Anglosphere in the early 2020s, with New Statesman suggesting various causes, including natural shifts in the electoral cycle and conservatives' unpopularity among university graduates and voters under the age of 40.

The 2020 United States presidential election saw the election of Kamala Harris as vice-president was widely regarded as a historic milestone, as the first woman and multicultural (African American and Asian American) to hold the office, reflecting broader trends toward increased diversity and representation in American politics, culture and society. She was conceded defeat as a presidential candidate at the 2024 United States presidential election to Donald Trump.

Following the election of Donald Trump in the 2024 United States presidential election, the mid-2020s saw the resurgence of right-wing populism and the 1980s political model (like Trumpist ideologies of conservatism, social conservatism, and anti-communist policies).

Political polarization has risen in other Western countries, not just the United States. while those who have very unfavourable opinions of the opposing party are at record highs as of 2022. The New York Times characterised this as part of a "new global divide", between national conservatism, social conservatism, and right-wing populism versus social democracy, liberalism, and pro-Europeanism (in Europe) or ethnic minorities such as African Americans (in the United States). The 2020s saw rise of far-right, ultranationalist, libertarian, or right-wing populist political parties in the Western Bloc and C12 member states, such as the People's Party of Canada, Liberal Party of Brazil, National Rally (France), Alternative for Germany, Reform UK, Reform Party (South Korea), Sanseitō (Japan), and in some cases, the Trump-faction of the Republican Party. Incumbent parties in all 10 major counties that held elections in 2024 lost, the first time this has ever happened since 1905. All 50 states and the District of Columbia shifted towards the Republican Party in the 2024 US presidential election.

==== Deaths ====
Sitting leaders that died such as Qaboos bin Said of Oman, Pierre Nkurunziza of Burundi, Amadou Gon Coulibaly of the Ivory Coast, Sabah al-Ahmad al-Jaber al-Sabah of Kuwait, Khalifa bin Salman Al Khalifa of Bahrain, John Magufuli of Tanzania, Idriss Déby of Chad, Jovenel Moïse of Haiti, Khalifa bin Zayed Al Nahyan of the United Arab Emirates, Elizabeth II of the United Kingdom, Nawaf Al-Ahmad Al-Jaber Al-Sabah of Kuwait, Hage Geingob of Namibia, Ebrahim Raisi of Iran, Nguyễn Phú Trọng of Vietnam, Didier Guillaume of Monaco, Pope Francis, and Ali Khamenei of Iran.

=== Prominent political events ===
==== Coups ====
Coups d'état against ruling governments during the decade include:

Event	Date	Country	Ref.
2020 Malian coup d'état	18 August 2020	Mali	
2021 Myanmar coup d'état	1 February 2021	Myanmar	
2021 Malian coup d'état	24 May 2021	Mali	
2021 Tunisian self-coup	25 July 2021	Tunisia	
2021 Guinean coup d'état	5 September 2021	Guinea	
2021 Sudan coup d'état	25 October 2021	Sudan	
January 2022 Burkina Faso coup d'état	23 January 2022	Burkina Faso	
2022 Ukrainian coup d'état attempt	January – February 2022	Ukraine	
September 2022 Burkina Faso coup d'état	30 September 2022	Burkina Faso	
2022 German coup d'état plot	7 December 2022	Germany	
2022 Peruvian self-coup attempt	7 December 2022	Peru	
2022 Brazilian coup plot	15 December 2022	Brazil	
2023 Nigerien coup d'état	26 July 2023	Niger	
2023 Gabonese coup d'état	30 August 2023	Gabon	
2024 Democratic Republic of the Congo coup attempt	19 May 2024	Democratic Republic of the Congo	
2024 Bolivian coup attempt	26 June 2024	Bolivia	
2024 South Korean martial law crisis	3 December 2024	South Korea	
2025 Malagasy coup d'état	12 October 2025	Madagascar	
2025 Guinea-Bissau coup d'état	26 November 2025	Guinea-Bissau	
2025 Beninese coup attempt	7 December 2025	Benin	
2025 Bangladesh coup attempt	21 December 2025	Bangladesh	
2026 Nigerien coup attempt	28 August 2026	Niger	

==== Africa ====
Event	Country	Date	Description	Ref.
Western Saharan clashes (2020–present)	Sahrawi Arab Democratic Republic; Morocco	8 November 2020 – ongoing	Following protests in the border town of Guerguerat in the disputed Western Sahara region, the Moroccan armed forces captured the town to ensure traffic could resume through the area. Since then, fighting and bombardments across the Moroccan Berm have taken place, with the Sahrawi Arab Democratic Republic declaring war against Morocco. It is the largest escalation in the conflict since the end of the Western Sahara War in 1991.	
2021–2022 Somali political crisis	Somalia	8 February 2021 – 10 January 2022	President of Somalia Mohamed Abdullahi Mohamed stayed in power past the end of his term and postponed elections scheduled for 2021. Prime Minister Mohamed Hussein Roble then called for the president to immediately step down. The president later dismissed Roble for alleged corruption. Protests were reported across the country in favour and opposed to the president. A deal to hold elections in May 2022 was reached in January which resulted in the incumbent president losing his bid for reelection.	
Nigerien crisis (2023–2024)	Niger; ECOWAS	26 July 2023 – 24 February 2024	The 2023 Nigerien coup d'état led to a severe diplomatic crisis between the putschists in Niger and the member states of ECOWAS.	

==== Americas ====
Event	Country	Date	Description	Ref.
First impeachment of Donald Trump	United States	24 September 2019 – 5 February 2020	Under Article I, Section 3, Clause 6, of the US Constitution, President Donald Trump was impeached for abuse of power and obstruction of Congress on 18 December 2019 by the United States House of Representatives. The United States Senate trial began on 16 January 2020 and ended on 5 February 2020, concluding with an acquittal on both charges.	
2020 Salvadoran political crisis	El Salvador	9 February 2020	During a political crisis, Salvadoran President Nayib Bukele sent forty soldiers of the Salvadoran Army into the Legislative Assembly building in an effort to coerce politicians to approve a loan request of $109 million from the United States for Bukele's security plan for the country. The event has been condemned by foreign governments, the political opposition, and human rights organisations and is considered the first major political crisis in the country since the conclusion of the Salvadoran Civil War in 1992 and has been referred to as a coup attempt.	
2020 United States presidential election and subsequent events	United States	3 November 2020 – 13 February 2021	The 59th United States presidential election was held on 3 November 2020. Democrat and former Vice-president Joe Biden defeated Republican and then-incumbent President Donald Trump, with the Electoral College formally declaring Biden the winner on 14 December 2020. Trump refused to concede, and filed lawsuits challenging the results in several states, though most of the legal challenges were either dismissed or dropped, with judges citing lack of evidence to suggest voter fraud occurred. Trump had also unsuccessfully attempted to undo the election results by forcing government officials to stop Pennsylvania, Nevada, Arizona, Wisconsin, Michigan, and Georgia from certifying Biden as the winner, and urging his supporters to "walk" to the United States Capitol to demand Trump be declared the winner of the election. This was one of the reasons for the decision of a group of his supporters to gather in Washington, D.C., on 6 January 2021 and break into the Capitol building during a Joint session of Congress. The January 6 United States Capitol attack disrupted Congress while certifying the election, forcing both chambers to undergo lockdown lasting for four hours. On the same day, Trump coerced then-incumbent vice-president Mike Pence to overturn the election results to which Pence refused. During the attack, Trump tweeted directly to his supporters falsely claiming Congress was attempting to assist in stealing the election. Twitter responded by suspending Trump's account permanently following Trump's tweet. Facebook, Instagram, YouTube, and Snapchat all also suspended Trump from using their platforms worrying his posts may incite additional violence to the Capitol attacks. In relation to this, Trump was impeached for the second time by the House of Representatives and became the first US president to be impeached twice. Meanwhile, Joe Biden was sworn in as the United States president on 20 January 2021. The Senate impeachment trial ended on 13 February 2021, one month after its start, resulting in Trump being found not guilty of inciting the attack on the Capitol. On 1 August 2023, a grand jury indicted Trump in the US District Court for the District of Columbia on four charges: conspiracy to defraud the United States, obstructing an official proceeding related to the certification of the election results on 6 January 2021, conspiring to obstruct an official proceeding, and conspiracy against rights.	
8th Congress of the Communist Party	Cuba	16–19 April 2021	At the 8th Congress of the Communist Party, Raúl Castro officially resigned as the First Secretary, the most powerful position in Cuba. Cuban President Miguel Díaz-Canel is officially named First Secretary of the Communist Party following the resignation of Raúl Castro. He is the first person not of the Castro family to hold the top position since the 1959 Cuban Revolution.	
2021 Salvadoran political crisis	El Salvador	1 May 2021	The Legislative Assembly of El Salvador voted to remove several judges from the Supreme Court and remove the Attorney General, both of which had been vocal opponents to the presidency of Nayib Bukele.	
Barbados's transition to a republic	Barbados	30 November 2021	Barbados became the newest republic in the world on 30 November 2021, its 55th Independence Day, when the already elected, previous Governor-General of Barbados, Sandra Mason, was sworn into office as the first president of the Caribbean country. This ended Queen Elizabeth II's 55-year tenure as monarch of an independent Barbados, prior to her death in a following year.	
2022 Colombian presidential election	Colombia	19 June 2022	Former 19th of April Movement guerrilla fighter and incumbent Senator Gustavo Petro defeats businessman and former mayor of Bucaramanga, Rodolfo Hernández Suárez, in the second round of the presidential election and becomes the first left-wing President in Colombian history.	
2022 Brazilian general election	Brazil	3–30 October 2022	Former president Luiz Inácio Lula da Silva defeats the incumbent president of Jair Bolsonaro in the second round of the presidential election; he becomes the first elected to three terms and the oldest president in Brazilian history.	
2023 Argentine general election	Argentina	22 October – 19 November 2023	General elections were held in Argentina on 22 October 2023 to elect the president, vice-president, members of the National Congress, and the governors of most provinces, in which right-wing Buenos Aires Deputy Javier Milei defeated left-wing Sergio Massa by with 56% of the vote, the highest percentage of the vote since Argentina's transition to democracy.	
2024 Mexican general election	Mexico	2 June 2024	Claudia Sheinbaum of the ruling Morena party won a landslide victory, margin of over 33 points, and she became country's first woman president succeed Andrés Manuel López Obrador and ultimately secured the nomination of the ruling coalition, Sigamos Haciendo Historia.	
2024 Venezuelan presidential election and political crisis	Venezuela	28 July 2024	Presidential elections were held on 28 July 2024 to choose a president for a six-year term beginning on 10 January 2025. The election was politically contentious, with international monitors calling it neither free nor fair, citing the incumbent Maduro administration having controlled most institutions and repressed the political opposition before, during, and after the election. Widely viewed as having won the election, former diplomat Edmundo González Urrutia fled to asylum in Spain amid repression of dissent and a national and international political crisis that resulted when Venezuelan electoral authorities announced—without presenting any evidence—that Nicolás Maduro won. Maduro ran for a third consecutive term, while González represented the Unitary Platform (Spanish: Plataforma Unitaria Democrática; PUD), the main opposition political alliance. In June 2023, the Venezuelan government had barred leading candidate María Corina Machado from participating. This move was regarded by the opposition as a violation of political human rights and was condemned by international bodies such as the Organization of American States (OAS), the European Union, and Human Rights Watch, as well as numerous countries. Academics, news outlets and the opposition provided "strong evidence" to suggest that González won the election by a wide margin with the opposition releasing copies of official tally sheets collected by poll watchers from a majority of polling centres showing a landslide victory for González. The government-controlled National Electoral Council (CNE) announced falsified results claiming a narrow Maduro victory on 29 July; vote tallies were not provided. The CNE's results were rejected by the Carter Center and by the OAS, and the United Nations declared that there was "no precedent in contemporary democratic elections" for announcing a winner without providing tabulated results. Analyses by media sources found the CNE results statistically improbable and lacking in credibility. Protests occurred across the country and internationally, as the Maduro administration initiated Operation Tun Tun, a crackdown on dissent. Some world leaders rejected the CNE's claimed results and recognised González as the election winner, while some other countries, including Russia, China, Iran, North Korea and Cuba recognised Maduro as the winner. Maduro did not cede power, and instead asked the Supreme Tribunal of Justice (TSJ), composed of justices loyal to Maduro, to audit and approve the results. On 22 August 2024, as anticipated, the TSJ described the CNE's statement of Maduro winning the election as "validated". The supreme court ruling was rejected by the United States, the European Union and ten Latin American countries. An arrest warrant was issued on 2 September 2024 for González for the alleged crimes of "usurpation of functions, falsification of public documents, instigation to disobey the law, conspiracy and association." After seeking asylum in the Spanish Embassy in Caracas, González left for Spain on 7 September 2024.	
2024 United States presidential election	United States	5 November 2024	The 60th United States presidential election was held on 5 November 2024. Democrat and former Vice-president Joe Biden initially planned to run against Republican and former President Donald Trump, in a rematch of the 2020 United States presidential election. In the aftermath of a much-criticised debate performance against Trump in June 2024, and far behind Trump in the polls, Biden was pressured to drop out of the race. Vice-President Kamala Harris took his place as the Democratic nominee, bypassing the usual primary process. Polling narrowed in the months leading up to election day, with the race too close to call across swing states and the country at large. Trump emerged the clear winner on election night, winning the popular vote and a clear majority of electoral college votes. Harris refused to concede on election night after it had become clear Trump had won the electoral college and popular vote. However, the following day, she conceded and acknowledged that Trump had won the election. This was the second of two elections won by Trump, the first being in 2016 against Hillary Clinton, preceding his defeat by Biden in 2020.	
2024–2025 Canadian political crisis and federal election	Canada	16 December 2024 – 28 April 2025	A political crisis emerged in Canada after Chrystia Freeland, the minister of finance and deputy prime minister, resigned from Cabinet on 16 December 2024. Justin Trudeau, the prime minister of Canada, announced his resignation on 6 January 2025. Former Governor of the Bank of Canada Mark Carney won twice in the Liberal Party leadership election and the federal election. He became prime minister five days later, succeeded Trudeau after nine years of premiership. Despite threats from US president Donald Trump, he was re-elected in the federal election, defeating his Conservative opponent Pierre Poilievre.	
2025 Bolivian general election	Bolivia	17 August – 19 October 2025	Rodrigo Paz Pereira won over Jorge Quiroga, marking the first time in Bolivian history that the presidency changed hands through a runoff election and ending two decades of MAS dominance. The MAS party suffered major historic losses, retaining only two seats in the Chamber of Deputies and losing all seats in the Senate.	
2025 United States federal government shutdown	United States	1 October – 12 November 2025	The federal government of the United States entered a shutdown at midnight EDT after Congress failed to pass appropriations legislation for the 2026 fiscal year, which began that day. The shutdown has continued for 39 days as Congress has been unable to pass a continuing resolution to fund the government. The House has advanced a continuing resolution, but the Senate has rejected it 14 times. Senate Democrats have opposed the Republican appropriations bill because it does not include an extension of the Affordable Care Act subsidies previously extended by the Inflation Reduction Act. The shutdown was the longest government shutdown in US history, lasting 43 days.	
Killing of Renée Good, followed by additional ICE killings and an escalation in anti-ICE protests	United States	7 February 2026	American activist and citizen Renée Good was shot and killed by ICE agents during Operation Metro Surge. After additional ICE shootings, including a shooting against two unarmed people and another activist killing, anti-ICE protests significantly escalated after cooling down the previous year. Notable flashpoints include the 2025 June Los Angeles protests, Operation Midway Blitz and protests, the No Kings demonstrations (including the largest single-day protest in American history), New Yorkers challenging ICE, and the 2026 Delaney Hall hunger strike and protests.	
Learning Resources v. Trump	United States	5 November 2025 – 20 February 2026	The Supreme Court of the United States heard a case deciding the legality of Trump's second term tariffs imposed under the International Emergency Economic Powers Act (IEEPA). The Supreme Court declared them illegal.	
2025 Chilean general election	Chile	16 November – 14 December 2025	Left-wing candidate Jeannette Jara won a plurality vote share in the first round on a broadly centre-left and pragmatic platform, while right-wing candidate José Antonio Kast's positions and defence of Pinochet-era and strong supporter of right-wing populism who won the second round with over 58% of the vote, securing victories in all sixteen regions. It is the first general election to occur after compulsory voting was reintroduced in 2022.	
2026 Greenland crisis	Greenland United States	22 December 2025 – 21 January 2026	Since 2025, the second Donald Trump administration of the United States has sought to annex Greenland, an autonomous territory of Denmark (itself in the European Union), triggering an ongoing international diplomatic crisis. This escalated in early 2026 after Trump refused to rule out the use of military force to annex Greenland and threatened a 25% import tax on goods from several European nations unless Denmark ceded Greenland. Trump's statements sparked a confrontation with Denmark and the EU (supported by several other NATO members), reigniting earlier concerns of a US–EU trade war. In January 2026, Trump reversed his position at the 2026 Davos conference, pledging not to use force nor tariffs to annex Greenland.	
2026 United States intervention in Venezuela	Venezuela	3 January 2026	The United States launched a series of airstrikes on Venezuela began when the United States Armed Forces bombed locations across northern Venezuela around 2:00 a.m. local time. More than 150 aircraft conducted strikes on areas around the capital city of Caracas, which resulted President Nicolás Maduro and the first lady, Cilia Flores, were captured by US forces and flown to New York City.	
Establishment of the Shield of the Americas	United States	5 – 7 March 2026	The Shield of the Americas established by US president Donald Trump on 7 March 2026, during a summit with several right-wing leaders from countries across the Western Hemisphere, the program is intended to coordinate military and security effortsto combat transnational criminal organisations, particularly drug cartels operating throughout the Americas. The signing took place at the Shield of the Americas Summit at Trump National Doral Miami. Attendees included Secretary of State Marco Rubio, Secretary of Defense Pete Hegseth, Secretary of Homeland Security Kristi Noem, Treasury Secretary Scott Bessent, Commerce Secretary Howard Lutnick, and US Trade Representative Jamieson Greer.	
2026 Peruvian general election	Peru	12 April – 7 June 2026	General elections were held in Peru from 12 to 13 April 2026 to elect the president, vice-presidents, and the Congress of the Republic of Peru. As no presidential candidate achieved a majority of votes in the first round, a runoff election was held on 7 June. In the first round, right-wing politician Keiko Fujimori placed first. Left-wing candidate Roberto Sánchez placed second, narrowly surpassing far-right businessman Rafael López Aliaga. Keiko made a narrow lead over Sanches in the second round. The congressional elections determined the composition of the Congress of Peru, which will return to being a bicameral legislature with a Senate (the first since the 1990 election) and a Chamber of Deputies. The runoff is likely to be one of the closest elections and the worst-ever election in Latin American history.	
2026 Colombian presidential election	Colombia	31 May – 21 June 2026	Far-right candidate Abelardo de la Espriella won over left-wing candidate Iván Cepeda with 40.9%. As none of the 13 candidates obtained at least 50% of the vote in the first round, the run-off was narrowly won by De la Espriella with 49.66% of the vote against 48.70% obtained by Cepeda, according to preliminary results. With 12.9 million votes, De la Espriella became the most voted presidential candidate in Colombian history and marked the return of Colombia's conservative rule since 2018.	
United States Semiquincentennial	United States	4 July 2026	The United States semiquincentennial celebrated 250th anniversary of the United States Declaration of Independence. Festivities marked various events leading up to the 250th Independence Day, 4 July 2026. Official festivities include commemorative coinage, UFC Freedom 250 at the White House, a "Great American State Fair" on the National Mall, Sail250, a Times Square Ball drop event, and the Freedom 250 Grand Prix around the National Mall. Part of the 2026 FIFA World Cup is being held across the United States, with matches in Philadelphia and Houston on the date of the semiquincentennial.	

==== Asia ====
Event	Country	Date	Description	Reference
2019–2021 Persian Gulf crisis	Iran; United States	5 May 2019	The Persian Gulf region saw tensions between the United States and the Islamic Republic of Iran escalate in mid-2019. The crisis saw oil tankers in the Strait of Hormuz sabotaged and seized, drone shootdowns, and efforts by the US and United Kingdom to pursue military patrols to protect shipping in the gulf, known as the International Maritime Security Construct. On 31 December 2019 tensions reached a breaking point as Iranian-backed Shiite militia stormed into the US Embassy in Baghdad, Iraq, leading to the targeted killing of Iranian General Qasem Soleimani in a US drone strike on 3 January 2020.	
2020–2022 Malaysian political crisis	Malaysia	22 February 2020 – 24 November 2022	Political infighting and party switching within Pakatan Harapan and Perikatan Nasional led to the inability to form a stable majority government. After the collapse of 2 successive governments and a snap general election held, the Anwar Ibrahim cabinet was formed, the first unity government in the history of Malaysia.	
2020–2021 China–India skirmishes	China; India	5 May 2020 – 20 January 2021	Since 5 May 2020, Chinese and Indian troops have engaged in aggressive melee, face-offs, and skirmishes at locations along the Sino-Indian border, including near the disputed Pangong Lake in Ladakh and the Tibet Autonomous Region, and near the border between Sikkim and the Tibet Autonomous Region. Additional clashes also took place at locations in eastern Ladakh along the Line of Actual Control (LAC).	
2021 Kyrgyz-Tajik clashes	Kyrgyzstan; Tajikistan	28 April – 1 May and 9 July 2021	A 3-day border conflict with clashes occurred in late April 2021 between the two Central Asian countries Kyrgyzstan and Tajikistan. The reason why the fighting broke out is disputed, but it is due either to an old water dispute or to local people's dissatisfaction with the installation of surveillance cameras near the border. After 3 days of intense clashes, that left more than 50 people dead and also more than 40,000 displaced civilians, the two countries agreed on a ceasefire. After the ceasefire, however, there was a fatal incident on 9 July.	
2021 Israel–Palestine crisis	Israel; Palestine	6–21 May 2021	Clashes between Israelis and Palestinians in Jerusalem lead to eleven days of fighting between Israel and Hamas in Gaza.	
2021 Taliban offensive	Afghanistan	1 May – 15 August 2021	Beginning on 1 May 2021, the Taliban and allied militant groups made a final offensive against the Islamic Republic of Afghanistan and its allies, coinciding with the withdrawal of most United States and allied troops from Afghanistan. It resulted in the de facto takeover of the country and the reinstatement of the Islamic Emirate of Afghanistan, ending the twenty-year-long War in Afghanistan on 15 August 2021.	
2021–2022 Iraqi political crisis	Iraq	5 November 2021 – 28 October 2022	The parliamentary election in October 2021 resulted in deadlock as members of the Council of Representatives of Iraq were unable to form a stable government or elect a new president. Ended in the election of Abdul Latif Rashid as president and Mohammed Shia' Al Sudani as prime minister.	
2022 Kyrgyz-Tajik clashes	Kyrgyzstan; Tajikistan	27 January – 20 September 2022	The sporadic fighting between Kyrgyzstan and Tajikistan, which had started in 2021, began again in late January 2022 and the bloody clashes resulted in dozens of deaths and injuries on 27 January 10 March, 3 and 14 June. In September, the fighting escalated and the 6 days of fighting between 14 and 20 September, which resulted in hundreds of deaths and injuries, finally ended on 20 September when the two countries signed a peace deal.	
2022–2024 Pakistan political unrest	Pakistan	3 April 2022 – 24 November 2024	The events began with a constitutional crisis in April 2022 after a no-confidence motion against Imran Khan was dismissed by the deputy speaker, made the first Prime Minister of Pakistan to be removed from office by a vote of no confidence. Khan would call for general elections to be held, but soon after he was the target of an assassination attempt and two arrests. Nationwide protests in support of Khan erupted after his arrests, culminating in the May 9 riots and a crackdown by the government. The events were a major event in the lead up to the 2024 general election.	
2024 Taiwanese presidential and legislative election	Taiwan	13 January 2024	Lai Ching-te of the DPP was elected president with 40.05% of the vote over New Taipei mayor Hou Yu-ih of the KMT and the TPP nominated Ko Wen-je, this marked the first time since 2000 that the winning candidate obtained less than 50% of the vote, and the first time that a party won more than two consecutive presidential elections since direct elections were introduced in 1996. The results saw the ruling DPP lost its majority in the Legislative Yuan that it had held since 2016, losing 11 seats and retaining 51, while the KMT became the largest single party with 52 seats, and the TPP won eight seats, and formed a minority government over controversial political status concerns.	
2024 Indian general election	India	19 April – 1 June 2024	The ruling conservative BJP of the NDA retained more seats, while the liberal INDIA coalition outperformed expectations, securing 234 seats, 99 of which were won by the Congress, garnering the party the official opposition status for the first time in 10 years.	
2024 Varzaqan helicopter crash	Iran	19 May 2024	An Iranian Air Force helicopter crashed near the village of Uzi, East Azerbaijan, Iran, killing President of Iran Ebrahim Raisi along with other political officials.	
2024–2025 Japanese political crisis	Japan	27 October 2024 – 22 October 2025	The Liberal Democratic Party, led by prime minister Shigeru Ishiba, after the resignation of Fumio Kishida as party leader due to his low approval rating amid the party-wide slush fund corruption scandal and several troubled events, the "Summer of Discontent" that led to the election. Both the LDP-KM coalition lost its majority in the 2024 Japanese general election and the 2025 Japanese House of Councillors election, which resulted his resignation and triggered a snap presidential election within the LDP resulted the election of Sanae Takaichi and 26 years of a coalition government.	
2024–2025 South Korean political crisis and presidential election	South Korea	3 December 2024 – 4 June 2025	Yoon Suk Yeol, the president of South Korea, declared martial law during a televised address which triggered to a political crisis. The impeachment occurred against president by the National Assembly following the impeachment motion raised against him on 14 December 2024, making the second president to be impeached since Park Geun-hye in 2016. Later Prime Minister Han Duck-soo was impeached two weeks later and replaced by Deputy Prime minister Choi Sang-mok, later he was reinstated three months later. South Korean government organisations and the Interpol prompted the agency to file an arrest warrant for Yoon on 30 December and on 15 January 2025 became the first sitting president arrested, later triggered into a snap presidential election following the removal of an impeached president and Lee Jae Myung elected as president over Kim Moon-soo.	
Arrest of Rodrigo Duterte	Philippines	11 March 2025	Former Philippine president Rodrigo Duterte was arrested by the PNP (CIDG), Interpol, and PCTC, under an ICC warrant charging him with crimes against humanity related to the Philippine drug war as the "act of terrorism". Duterte arrived at Ninoy Aquino International Airport in Metro Manila on 11 March after attending a political rally in Hong Kong and transferred to the Hague for a face trial. He is the first leader from Asia to face trial before the ICC.	
2025 India–Pakistan conflict	India; Pakistan	23 April – 10 May 2025	India and Pakistan fell into a military and diplomatic crisis began after the 2025 Pahalgam attack, a terrorist attack in the Baisaran Valley of Jammu and Kashmir by The Resistance Front (TRF), which killed 26 people. A direct conflict broke out on 7 May 2025, after India launched missile strikes on Pakistan, codenamed Operation Sindoor. However, on 10 May 2025, Pakistan launched their retaliatory operation codenamed Operation Bunyan-um-Marsoos and military hostilities continued until a ceasefire made as a short-lived conflict.	
July Declaration and Charter	Bangladesh	4 August – 17 October 2025	The July Declaration and Charter was officially recognised document of the July Uprising. It was formally announced by Chief Adviser Muhammad Yunus, marking the first anniversary of the revolution. The declaration, which was prepared under strict confidentiality, outlined 28 points addressing political, constitutional, and governance issues.	
2025 LDP presidential election, the formation of Takaichi Cabinet, and the 2026 Japanese general election	Japan	4 October 2025 – 9 February 2026	Sanae Takaichi was elected the first female president of the Liberal Democratic Party of Japan. She is expected to become Japan's first female prime minister and focused on Abenomics and fixing political problems. Some sources have described her as ultraconservative or right-wing populist and pro-Donald Trump relationship in the US. She became the first prime minister in history, the Kansai-based JIP joined as a right-wing conservative coalition, and the formation of Takaichi Cabinet three weeks later. A snap election was announced by the government and the formation of the Centrist Reform Alliance as the rival coalition who defeated by a historic landslide victory since 2012, three months after its formation.	
2025–2026 China–Japan diplomatic crisis and Student Mobilisation Act	China; Japan	10 November 2025–present	Diplomatic tensions between China and Japan entered a state of crisis in November 2025, after Japanese prime minister Sanae Takaichi said in the Japanese parliament that a potential Chinese attack on Taiwan could potentially constitute an "existential crisis for Japan" under the Legislation for Peace and Security, allowing Japan to take military action in collective self-defence. The controversial Student Mobilisation Act was approved by the Japanese MPs focused to safeguard Taiwan from a Chinese invasion and the American defence, along with neighbouring South Korea also approved the act.	
2026 Bangladeshi general election and constitutional referendum	Bangladesh	12 February 2026	Two major opposition parties, the BNP and Jamaat made gains from the controversially banned Awami League party after the July Uprising in two years. The BNP, led by Tarique Rahman, won a landslide victory in the election, securing two-thirds of seats; Jamaat secured the second most seats. A constitutional referendum on the July Charter which resulted another victory for pro-for supporters. The election was also considered to be the world's first "Gen Z-inspired" election after the series of Gen Z protests around the world.	
2026 Nepalese general election	Nepal	5 March 2026	The opposition Rastriya Swatantra Party made won a landslide victory over the Nepali Congress and the Communist Party of Nepal (Unified Marxist–Leninist), it is the second election after youth protests in September 2025 that led to the resignation of Prime Minister K. P. Sharma Oli. Former rapper-turned political activist Balen Shah became one of the prime ministerial candidates supports constitutional socialism, market socialism, progressivism, political pragmatism, participatory democracy, economic liberalism, and political freedom.	

==== Europe ====
Event	Country	Date	Description	Ref.
Brexit	United Kingdom	31 January 2020	The United Kingdom and Gibraltar formally withdrew from the European Union at 11 pm (GMT).	
Eighth NATO enlargement	North Macedonia	27 March 2020	North Macedonia became a member state of NATO after the 2018 Prespa Agreement.	
Bulgarian political crisis (2021–2026)	Bulgaria	4 April 2021 – 8 May 2026	A series of unstable governments and a gridlock resulted in eight elections occurring over five years.	
Belarus–European Union border crisis	Belarus European Union	7 July 2021	A migrant crisis and humanitarian disaster involving an influx of coordinated groups of immigrants, primarily from Iraq and elsewhere in the Middle East and North Africa, to Poland, Lithuania and Latvia via their borders with Belarus. The crisis was triggered by the severe deterioration in Belarus–European Union relations following the 2020 Belarusian presidential election, the 2020–2021 Belarusian protests, the Ryanair Flight 4978 incident and subsequent sanctions on Belarus, as well as the attempted forced repatriation of Olympic sprinter Krystsina Tsimanouskaya from the Olympic Games in Tokyo, Japan. Belarusian president Alexander Lukashenko deliberately had immigrants from the Middle East flown into Belarus to "flood Europe with migrants and drugs."	
2022 United Kingdom government crisis	United Kingdom	5 July – 25 October 2022	Two government crises occurred between July and October 2022: Several officials resigned from their positions in Prime Minister Boris Johnson's second ministry, culminating in Johnson announcing his resignation on 7 July and two leadership elections after new prime minister Liz Truss lost in public confidence following her September mini-budget. Chancellor Rishi Sunak became prime minister three months after the crisis.	
Death and state funeral of Elizabeth II and accession of Charles III	United Kingdom	8 September 2022	Elizabeth II, the Queen of the United Kingdom and the other Commonwealth realms, the longest-living and longest-reigning British monarch, reigning since 6 February 1952, died at the age of 96. Her son Charles acceded to the throne as King Charles III immediately, after serving as heir apparent for 70 years, the longest in British history.	
2022 Italian general election	Italy	25 September 2022	The right-wing coalition led by Giorgia Meloni's Brothers of Italy won an absolute majority in both houses. On 22 October, Meloni was appointed prime minister, becoming the first woman to hold the office.	
2023 Montenegrin presidential election	Montenegro	2 April 2023	Europe Now! candidate Jakov Milatović wins the 2nd round of the presidential election against incumbent president Milo Đukanović of the DPS. Đukanović, who had ruled the country almost continuously since 1991 either as president or prime minister, thus lost power for the first time after more than 32 years. Milatović's victory was also the first time that the DPS lost a presidential election since 1990.	
Ninth and tenth NATO enlargements	Finland; Sweden	4 April 2023 – 7 March 2024	Finland and Sweden applied to join NATO following the 2022 Russian invasion of Ukraine and were formally accepted the following years. This ended their neutralities existing more than two centuries, becoming the latest Nordic countries to join the alliance.	
Coronation of Charles III and Camilla	United Kingdom	6 May 2023	The coronation of Charles III and his wife, Camilla, as king and queen of the United Kingdom and the other Commonwealth realms, took place on 6 May. Charles III acceded to the throne on 8 September 2022, following the death of his mother, Elizabeth II. This was the first coronation of a British monarch since Elizabeth II was crowned 70 years earlier in 1953.	
2023 Polish parliamentary election	Poland	15 October 2023	The United Right secured the highest number of seats in the election, but failed to achieve a majority in the Sejm. Meanwhile, the opposition, headed by Donald Tusk, successfully garnered a parliamentary majority. This represents a shift in the Sejm's majority for the first time in eight years in Poland.	
2023–2024 French government and political crises	France	11 December 2023–present	In December 2023, the Borne government faced a governability and credibility crisis. It was caused mainly by the difficult passage of the 2023 immigration and asylum bill, resulted the short-lived Attal government formed for eight months. The 2024 French legislative election organised and held in June 2024, which resulted in a hung parliament with the left-wing New Popular Front (NFP) leading a plurality. The fragile political context resulted in the formation of two short-lived minority governments, headed by Michel Barnier, François Bayrou, and Sébastien Lecornu respectively, both of which ended up collapsing over budgetary disputes.	
Abdication of Margrethe II and accession of Frederik X	Denmark	14 January 2024	In the first voluntary abdication of a Danish monarch since that of King Eric III in 1146, Queen Margrethe II abdicated the throne and was succeeded by her elder son, King Frederik X, bringing an end to her 52-year reign.	
2024 European Parliament election	European Union	6–9 June 2024	European People's Party led by President of the European Commission Ursula von der Leyen win the most seats in the European Parliament. The right-wing European Conservatives and Reformists and the Europe of Sovereign Nations parties made gains than pro-EU centrist, liberal, social democrat and environmentalist parties in history.	
2024–2025 Dutch political crisis and 2025 general election	Netherlands	2 July 2024 – 29 October 2025	In July 2024, the Schoof cabinet faced a governing crisis since the 2023 Dutch general election, with the longest government formation in modern Dutch history. It was caused mainly by the difficult passage of the immigration and asylum bill, and the cabinet fell after the far-right Party for Freedom (PVV) left the coalition and cabinet on 3 June 2025 due to a public discontent. A snap election was held in October 2025. The liberal and centrist CDA-D66 grand coalition made gains and PVV became the two largest parties, each winning 44 and 26 seats and about 17% of the vote. A four-month cabinet formation led to the minority Jetten cabinet in February 2026, which made Rob Jetten the youngest person, the first openly gay man and first openly LGBT person, and the first politician from the Democrats 66 party to serve as Prime Minister of the Netherlands.	
2024 German government crisis and 2025 federal election	Germany	6 November 2024 – 23 February 2025	Chancellor Olaf Scholz announced the dismissal of the then-finance minister Christian Lindner, and leader of the Free Democratic Party (FDP), from his cabinet due to the ongoing economic crisis. The government crisis led to a snap election being called for February 2025. The conservative CDU/CSU won over the far-right Alternative for Germany and Friedrich Merz became Chancellor after the government formation.	
2024 and 2025 Romanian presidential elections	Romania	24 November 2024 – 18 May 2025	A series of two presidential elections held in Romania, began with the annulation of the first election following the result of a controversial first round with nationalist candidate Călin Georgescu achieving a relative majority of votes. The second election began in February 2025, with the arrest and rejection of Georgescu as the candidate after Ilie Bolojan became acting president for three months until the election. The centrist candidate Nicusor Dan won the election over nationalist George Simion.	
2025 London Summit on Ukraine	United Kingdom	2 March 2025	A meeting of international leaders in London on 2 March 2025, called by British Prime Minister Keir Starmer to draft a peace plan for the Russo-Ukrainian war to take to the United States. The summit followed the meeting of Ukrainian President Volodymyr Zelenskyy at the White House in Washington on 28 February 2025 with President Donald Trump and Vice-President JD Vance.	
Death and funeral of Pope Francis and the 2025 papal conclave	Vatican City	21 April – 8 May 2025	Pope Francis died on Easter Monday at the age of 88 in his residence in Domus Sanctae Marthae after 12 years of papacy, and just following the 20th anniversary of the death and funeral of Pope John Paul II. His death triggered a papal interregnum and a nine-day period of mourning. The pope's funeral, by tradition, takes place within four to six days of the pope's death; he was buried at Santa Maria Maggiore in Rome. His successor Pope Leo XIV was elected as pontiff in the 2025 papal conclave two weeks later; he became the first pope from the United States and the second from the Americas.	
2025 Moldovan parliamentary election	Moldova	28 September 2025	The ruling pro-European Party of Action and Solidarity (PAS) retained the parliamentary election over pro-Russian Patriotic Electoral Bloc (BEP) suffered minor losses, the election was described as potentially determining the fate of Moldova's accession bid into the European Union (EU) with President Maia Sandu calling it "the most important election in the history of the country".	
2025 Irish presidential election	Ireland	24 October 2025	Catherine Connolly is elected President of Ireland in a landslide. Connolly is characterised in the press as a left-wing socialist politician. Connolly's landslide victory was seen as a rebuke to the centre-right Irish governing coalition and stauch supporter of Irish neutrality.	
Operation Midas	Ukraine	13 November 2025	The Operation Midas is the name of the currently ongoing anti-corruption investigation of the National Anti-Corruption Bureau of Ukraine (NABU) and the Specialized Anti-Corruption Prosecutor's Office (SAP), launched in 2024. The investigation concerns large-scale defences in the energy sector of Ukraine, committed during the Russo-Ukrainian war, it is considered one of the most high-profile anti-corruption investigations in Ukraine since the beginning of the war.	
2026 Hungarian parliamentary election	Hungary	12 April 2026	Parliamentary elections were held in Hungary on 12 April 2026 to elect all 199 members of the National Assembly. It was the 10th parliamentary election and the highest-turnout election since Hungary's transition to democracy in 1990. The opposition Tisza Party, led by former Fidesz member and MEP Péter Magyar, won the election in a landslide, defeating the incumbent Fidesz–KDNP government of Prime Minister Viktor Orbán and ending the 16-year Orbán era. Tisza won a two-thirds supermajority, which is the legislative threshold to amend the Constitution of Hungary.	
2026 Bulgarian parliamentary election	Bulgaria	19 April 2026	The centre-left populist Progressive Bulgaria led by former president Rumen Radev obtained a landslide victory, with 43.9% of the vote and an outright majority of seats. Most other parties lost seats and nearly 20% of votes were wasted due to the electoral threshold. The pro-European conservative GERB–SDS lost half and liberal PP–DB gaine one seat of its support and the Movement for Rights and Freedoms (DPS) had its weakest result since 1994. Moreover, the Bulgarian Socialist Party (BSP)-led BSP – United Left (BSP–OL) alliance failed to enter the National Assembly for the first time since its foundation in 1991.	
2026 United Kingdom government crisis and Labour leadership election	United Kingdom	7 May – 20 July 2026	A leadership crisis within the Labour Party emerged amid public and internal party dissatisfaction with Keir Starmer, prime minister of the United Kingdom, and his government. Dissatisfaction with Labour's worst results in the local elections in May 2026 and discontent over policy and personnel issues led for calls for Starmer to resign as leader, and the resignation of several members of the government. Andy Burnham to successfully contest and won in a by-election for Makerfield to be able to be stand for a leadership election, resulting Starmer announced his resignation on 22 June 2026. Burnham had been opposed, and became the Leader of the Labour Party on 17 July 2026 and became prime minister three days later.	
2026 Morocco–Spain border incident	Spain	30 July 2026–present	An international incident involving border crossing began in late July 2026, when tens of thousands of people rushed illegally from Morocco into the Spanish North African autonomous city of Ceuta, with smaller numbers attempting to cross into Melilla. Most entered by swimming around the Tarajal and Benzú breakwaters or by crossing on foot along the shoreline, overwhelming local reception facilities and prompting the Government of Ceuta to request that Spain declare a national emergency. Most entered by swimming around the breakwaters of Tarajal and Benzú or by crossing on foot along the shoreline.	
Death and state funeral of Harald V	Norway	28 August – 9 September 2026	Harald V, King of Norway, died on 28 August 2026 at the age of 89 at Oslo University Hospital Rikshospitalet, where he had been admitted since 17 August. He was succeeded by his son, Crown Prince Haakon, who became King Haakon VIII.	

==== Oceania ====
Event	Country	Date	Description	Ref.
2021 Samoan constitutional crisis	Samoa	22 May – 23 July 2021	Following a general election, the results were in stasis while incumbent prime minister Tuila'epa Sa'ilele Malielegaoi refused to step down. The Supreme Court of Samoa decided the matter, and the FAST party and its leader Fiamē Naomi Mataʻafa was declared the winner.	
2021 Solomon Islands unrest	Solomon Islands	24–27 November 2021	A period of unrest began due to a variety of factors, notably the government's response to the COVID-19 pandemic as well as the decision to retract diplomatic recognition of Taiwan and instead recognise China.	
2022 Kiribati constitutional crisis	Kiribati	May – October 2022	A crisis began when High Court Judge David Lambourne was suspended in May 2022 and Chief Justice Bill Hastings was suspended on 30 June 2022, both over allegations of misconduct. In October 2022, the president Taneti Maamau appointed Attorney General Tetiro Semilota as acting chief justice.	
2022 Fijian general election	Fiji	14 December 2022	16-year incumbent prime minister Frank Bainimarama of the FijiFirst party was unable to form a government after winning a plurality of seats. Former prime minister and leader of the 1987 military coups Sitiveni Rabuka of the newly established People's Alliance returned to the position.	
2022 Australian federal election	Australia	21 May 2022	The Australian Labor Party led by Anthony Albanese won over the Liberal–National Coalition government, led by Prime Minister Scott Morrison, The Labor Party achieved a majority government for the first time since 2007, winning 77 seats in the House of Representatives. Albanese was sworn in as prime minister on 23 May 2022, becoming the fourth Labor leader to win government from opposition since World War II and he claimed victory and acknowledged Morrison's concession.	
2023 New Zealand general election	New Zealand	14 October 2023	The incumbent centre-left Labour Party, led by Chris Hipkins, were defeated at the polls, with the centre-right National Party, led by Christopher Luxon, becoming the largest party in the new parliament. Christopher Luxon became prime minister on 27 November 2023, ending six years of the Sixth Labour Government under Jacinda Ardern and Chris Hipkins.	
2025 Australian federal election	Australia	21 May 2022	The Australian Labor Party led by Anthony Albanese was re-elected for a second term in a landslide victory over the opposition Liberal–National Coalition, led by Peter Dutton. Labor secured 94 seats in the House of Representatives—the highest number of seats ever won by a single political party in an Australian election. Labor also received the highest two-party-preferred vote of any party since 1975—at 55.22%. This victory was much larger than expected from the opinion polling released shortly before the election, which had predicted a smaller Labor majority or a minority government.	

== Assassinations and attempts ==
Prominent assassinations, targeted killings, and assassination attempts include:

Date	Description	Reference(s)
3 January 2020	Qasem Soleimani, Iranian general, and leader in the Islamic Revolutionary Guard, is killed in an airstrike conducted by the United States near Baghdad International Airport.	
27 November 2020	Mohsen Fakhrizadeh, a senior official in the nuclear program in Iran, is killed in an ambush against his motorcade in Absard.	
22 February 2021	Luca Attanasio, Italian ambassador to the Democratic Republic of the Congo, is killed by gunmen while travelling in North Kivu.	
20 April 2021	Idriss Déby, 6th president of Chad, is killed while commanding forces against rebels during the Insurgency in Northern Chad, and is succeeded by transitional president and military general, Mahamat Kaka.	
6 May 2021	Mohamed Nasheed, Speaker of the Maldivian People's Majlis, is wounded in an explosion alleged by Maldivian authorities to have been conducted by religious extremists.	
7 July 2021	Jovenel Moïse, 48th president of Haiti, is killed by gunmen at his private residence. First Lady Martine Moïse is severely wounded.	
15 October 2021	David Amess, British Conservative Party MP, is killed by an Islamic terrorist during a constituency surgery.	
7 November 2021	Mustafa Al-Kadhimi, Prime Minister of Iraq, survives a drone attack that injures six in his security detail.	
8 June 2022	Brett Kavanaugh, a United States Supreme Court Justice, is the target of an assassination plot in which the alleged assassin was motivated by a leaked Supreme Court decision that was poised to overrule Roe v. Wade, the 1973 decision that guaranteed abortion as a right.	
8 July 2022	Shinzo Abe, former prime minister of Japan, is killed while giving a campaign speech by a former navy sailor who held a grudge against the South Korean-based Unification Church.	
31 July 2022	Ayman al-Zawahiri, the leader of the Salafi-jihadist group al-Qaeda, is killed by a drone strike conducted by the US-based CIA in Kabul, Afghanistan.	
12 August 2022	Salman Rushdie, an Indian-born British-American novelist, is stabbed multiple times as he is about to give a public lecture at the Chautauqua Institution in Chautauqua, New York, United States. Rushdie has been the subject of a fatwā written by Supreme Leader of Iran Ruhollah Khomeini calling for his death since 1989.	
1 September 2022	Cristina Fernández de Kirchner, then vice-president and former president of Argentina, survives an attempt on her life after the assailant's weapon malfunctions.	
28 October 2022	Nancy Pelosi, who at the time was Speaker of the United States House of Representatives, is the target of a failed assassination attempt when a man armed with a hammer breaks into her residence. He instead assaults her husband, causing serious injuries as she was not home at the time of the attempt.	
3 November 2022	Imran Khan, former prime minister of Pakistan, is shot in the leg while travelling in a convoy in Wazirabad amid anti-government protests.	
15 April 2023	Fumio Kishida, Prime Minister of Japan, is alleged to have been the target of an assassination attempt and survived by a bomb explosion in the fishing port of Saikazaki, Wakayama, Wakayama Prefecture, in the Kansai region to give a campaign stump speech for the 2023 Wakayama 1st district by-election.	
9 August 2023	Fernando Villavicencio, Ecuadorian politician and candidate for President of Ecuador, is shot to death following a campaign event in Quito.	
23 August 2023	Key figures in the Russian paramilitary organisation Wagner Group, including its founder and leader Yevgeny Prigozhin, are killed in a plane crash widely believed to have been an assassination carried out by the Russian government after an attempted rebellion by Prigozhin earlier in the summer.	
9 November 2023	Alejo Vidal-Quadras Roca is shot in the face in Madrid by a person on a motorbike.	
2 January 2024	South Korean opposition leader-turned president Lee Jae-myung is stabbed in the neck during a visit to Busan.	
3 March 2024	A convoy carrying Volodymyr Zelenskyy, President of Ukraine, and Kyriakos Mitsotakis, Prime Minister of Greece, in the city of Odesa are targeted by a Russian missile strike that kills at least five people with at least one missile reportedly missing them by 150 meters.	
15 May 2024	Robert Fico, Prime Minister of Slovakia is shot while meeting with supporters at an event in Handlová.	
13 July 2024	Donald Trump, former president of the United States, is shot at a presidential campaign rally he held near Butler, Pennsylvania.	
30 July 2024	Abdel Fattah al-Burhan, the leader of Sudan, survives an assassination attempt from a drone attack in Jubayt while attending a ceremony.	
31 July 2024	Ismail Haniyeh, Palestinian political leader of Hamas, is assassinated in Tehran in an attack widely believed to have been conducted by Israel.	
15 September 2024	Donald Trump, former president of the United States and Republican Party nominee in the 2024 United States presidential election, is the subject of a second assassination attempt at his Mar-a-Lago estate in Florida, after nearly being killed in Butler, Pennsylvania two months prior.	
27 September 2024	Hassan Nasrallah, leader of Hezbollah, is killed in an airstrike by the Israeli Air Force in Beirut.	
16 October 2024	Yahya Sinwar, Palestinian political leader of Hamas, is killed in Rafah in a military operation conducted by Israel, two months after the assassination of his predecessor Ismail Haniyeh.	
4 December 2024	Brian Thompson, American businessman and CEO of UnitedHealthcare, is shot and killed outside the New York Hilton Midtown hotel in Manhattan, New York City. The suspected assassin, Luigi Mangione, received support and was celebrated, by many online, as a folk hero.	
16 December 2024	Igor Kirillov, Russian NBC Protection Troops commander Lieutenant-General, is assassinated by a scooter bombing in Moscow.	
18 March 2025	Hassan Sheikh Mohamud, the President of Somalia, narrowly survives an assassination attempt by the militant group Al-Shabaab at his presidential palace in Mogadishu while his entourage headed for Aden Adde International Airport.	
12 April 2025	Paetongtarn Shinawatra, Prime Minister of Thailand, survives an assassination attempt and a bomb plot by an angry man while providing relief to Myanmar earthquake victims during the Songkran festival in Bangkok.	
7 June 2025	Miguel Uribe Turbay, Colombian senator and presidential candidate, is shot at a campaign event in Bogotá, later pronounced dead from his injuries on 11 August.	
14 June 2025	Melissa and Mark Hortman, a political couple, are assassinated during a series of home invasions and manhunts in Brooklyn Park, Minnesota, while State Senator John Hoffman survives an assassination attempt in Champlin.	
30 August 2025	Andriy Parubiy, member and former chairman of the Ukrainian parliament, is shot and killed in Lviv by a gunman disguised as a delivery driver, who flees on an e-bike.	
10 September 2025	Charlie Kirk, American conservative political activist, is assassinated during a Turning Point USA event at Utah Valley University.	
1 November 2025	Carlos Manzo, Mexican politician and mayor of Uruapan, Michoacán, is assassinated in Day of the Dead of Mexico because of his hardline policies against organised crime.	
18 December 2025	Osman Hadi, Bangladeshi political activist, is assassinated in the Paltan area of Dhaka. He was airlifted to the Singapore General Hospital on 15 December, where pronounced dead three days later, and a planned coup by the loyal Bangladesh Army led to a major political violence.	
3 February 2026	Saif al-Islam Gaddafi, Libyan political figure and son of the late Libyan leader Muammar Gaddafi, was shot and killed by an unknown armed group at his private garden in Zintan.	
22 February 2026	El Mencho, the leader of the Jalisco New Generation Cartel, was killed, along with six others in an operation by the Mexican Armed Forces in Tapalpa, Jalisco.	
28 February 2026	Ali Khamenei, the supreme leader of Iran since 1989, was assassinated by an Israeli strike at his palace in the capital Tehran. His son Mojtaba was elected unopposed at the indirect 2026 Iranian supreme leader election by the Assembly of Experts the following week.	
17 March 2026	Ali Larijani, the secretary of the Supreme National Security Council, was assassinated in Tehran as part of a series of airstrikes and a broader assassination campaign against high-ranking Iranian officials.	
25 April 2026	US president Donald Trump was subject of a third assassination attempt at the White House Correspondent's Dinner, along with other administration officials.	
27 May 2026	Suspended CHP leader Özgür Özel was subject of an assassination attempt target by the Grey Wolves while meeting with supporters at an event in Istanbul, during the ongoing Republican People's Party absolute nullity crisis.	

== Disasters ==
=== Non-natural disasters ===
==== Aviation ====
Event	Date	Country	Description	Ref.
Ukraine International Airlines Flight 752	8 January 2020	Iran	Ukraine International Airlines Flight 752 was shot down shortly after take-off from Tehran Imam Khomeini International Airport, Tehran, by the Islamic Revolutionary Guard Corps, who claimed to have mistaken it for a cruise missile. All 176 people on board were killed.	
Pakistan International Airlines Flight 8303	22 May 2020	Pakistan	Pakistan International Airlines Flight 8303 crashed into a neighbourhood in Karachi while attempting to land, killing 97 of the 99 people on board plus 1 person on the ground.	
Sriwijaya Air Flight 182	9 January 2021	Indonesia	Sriwijaya Air Flight 182 crashed into the Java Sea shortly after take-off from Soekarno–Hatta International Airport, Jakarta, killing all 62 people on board.	
China Eastern Airlines Flight 5735	21 March 2022	China	China Eastern Airlines Flight 5735 crashed into the ground near Wuzhou mid-flight, killing all 132 people on board.	
Yeti Airlines Flight 691	15 January 2023	Nepal	Yeti Airlines Flight 691 crashed into a gorge while attempting to land in Pokhara, killing all 72 people on board.	
Voepass Linhas Aéreas Flight 2283	9 August 2024	Brazil	Voepass Linhas Aéreas Flight 2283 crashed in a residential area near Vinhedo, São Paulo, killing all 62 people on board.	
Azerbaijan Airlines Flight 8243	25 December 2024	Kazakhstan	Azerbaijan Airlines Flight 8243 crashed while attempting an emergency landing near Aqtau International Airport, killing 38 of the 67 people on board.	
Jeju Air Flight 2216	29 December 2024	South Korea	Jeju Air Flight 2216 crashed into a fence while attempting to land at Muan International Airport, killing 179 of the 181 people on board.	
American Eagle Flight 5342	29 January 2025	United States	American Eagle Flight 5342 collides with a Sikorsky UH-60L Black Hawk mid-air while approaching Ronald Reagan Washington National Airport, killing all 67 people on board both aircraft.	
Air India Flight 171	12 June 2025	India	Air India Flight 171 crashes shortly after takeoff from Ahmedabad Airport, killing 241 of the 242 people on board plus 28 people on the ground.	
2026 Colombian Air Force Lockheed C-130 crash	23 March 2026	Colombia	A Colombian Aerospace Force Lockheed C-130 Hercules crashed into dense jungle while taking off from Caucayá Airport in Puerto Leguízamo en route to Tres de Mayo Airport in Puerto Asís, both located in Colombia's Putumayo department near the border with Peru and Ecuador. There were 126 people on board, of whom 69 were killed, and 57 survived with injuries. It is the second deadliest crash in the history of the Colombian Aerospace Force and is the deadliest aviation crash of 2026.	

==== General ====
Event	Date	Country	Description	Ref.
2020 Beirut explosion	4 August 2020	Lebanon	A massive explosion occurred in the port of Beirut. The blast was so loud that it was even reported to be heard in Cyprus, which is approximately 240 km from the location of the explosion. The windows of major buildings in a 6-mile radius were shattered and roads were filled with debris. According to initial findings, it was estimated that a warehouse with 2,750 tonnes of ammonium nitrate exploded, which was confiscated by the Lebanese government from the abandoned ship MV Rhosus and then stored in the port without proper safety measures for six years. 220 deaths were confirmed, more than 110 people were missing and at least 7,000 were reported injured. Beirut governor Marwan Abboud estimated that up to 300,000 people were left homeless by the explosions and there was $10–15 billion USD in property damage.	
Surfside condominium collapse	24 June 2021	United States	A 12-story beachfront condominium in the Miami suburb of Surfside, Florida, partially collapsed. As of 22 July 2021, a total of 98 people are confirmed to have died, while 11 were injured. One person was rescued from the rubble, and about 35 people were rescued on 24 June from the uncollapsed portion of the building, which was demolished 11 days later as a safety precaution due to the approach of Hurricane Elsa. On 7 July, authorities announced that the objective of the search was transitioning from rescue to recovery and that the missing victims are presumed dead.	
2022 Yerevan explosion	14 August 2022	Armenia	A large explosion took place in the Surmalu shopping centre in the Armenian capital of Yerevan. It caused widespread destruction and fire, leaving dozens of dead and injured. The explosion killed 16 people and injured 63, with nine missing as of 20 August.	
Destruction of the Kakhovka Dam	6 June 2023	Ukraine	Russo-Ukrainian war: The Nova Kakhovka dam in the Russian-controlled region of Kherson is destroyed, threatening the region with devastating floodwaters.	
Titan submersible implosion	18 June 2023	Canada	A submersible by OceanGate, carrying five occupants, notably, Shahzada Dawood, Hamish Harding, Paul-Henri Nargeolet, and Stockton Rush, imploded, after an expedition to explore the Titanic's ruins. The incident was widely reported in the news and caused multiple investigations and a lawsuit. OceanGate suspended all its commercial operations after the implosion.	
Derna dam collapses	10 – 11 September 2023	Libya	The Derna dam collapses were the catastrophic failures of two dams in Derna, Libya on the night of 10–11 September 2023, in the aftermath of Storm Daniel. The dam collapses released an estimated 30 million m^{3} (39 million yd^{3}) of water, causing flooding downstream as the Wadi Derna overflowed its banks. The floods partially destroyed the city of Derna. Estimates for the number of casualties range from 5,300 to 20,000 people. The event was the second-deadliest dam failure in history, after the 1975 Banqiao Dam failure in China.	
Jet Set nightclub roof collapse	8 April 2025	Dominican Republic	During a concert by merengue singer Rubby Pérez, the roof of the venue collapsed. The cause remains undetermined. 236 people died and over 180 were injured, out of over 500 people in the club at the time. Notable deaths included Pérez, former MLB players Tony Blanco and Octavio Dotel, and Nelsy Cruz, a regional governor. It was one of the deadliest non-natural disasters in Dominican history.	
Liuyang and Liushenyu industrial explosions	4-22 May 2026	China	Two major industrial explosions occurred at a fireworks factory Guandu, Liuyang, Changsha, Hunan and the Liushenyu Coal Mine, Qinyuan County, Shanxi, China, which resulted 120 deaths and more than 180 injured.	

==== Fires ====
Event	Date	Country	Description	Ref.
Kartalkaya hotel fire	21 January 2025	Turkey	A fire occurred at the Grand Kartal Hotel at the Kartalkaya ski resort in Bolu Province, Turkey; at least 78 people died, 51 others were injured. The fire started in the hotel's fourth floor kitchen/restaurant section. It occurred during the Turkish winter school break, when the hotel was 80–90% full.	
Kočani nightclub fire	16 March 2025	North Macedonia	A fire at the Pulse nightclub likely caused by pyrotechnics used at the concert. Twenty people were arrested after the fire, including the nightclub owner. According to a preliminary investigation, the nightclub did not have a licence and was overcrowded. The number of victims was over sixty.	
Wang Fuk Court fire	26 November 2025	Hong Kong	A deadly explosion and fire broke out at the Wang Fuk Court apartment complex in Tai Po District, New Territories, Hong Kong. At least 168 people were killed, and 79 were injured, including 12 firefighters as of 30 November 2025. Many of those who died were trapped in their apartments. It is the third deadliest in Hong Kong's history and the deadliest since the Wing On warehouse fire in Shek Tong Tsui that killed 176 people in 1948.	
Crans-Montana bar fire	1 January 2026	Switzerland	The fire is suspected to have started with celebration Sparkler placed on champagne bottles that were carried too close to the ceiling. The majority of the victims were Swiss, but about a third were citizens of other countries, especially France and Italy.	
Bangkok pub fire	12 July 2026	Thailand	A destructive fire occurred shortly before midnight ICT (UTC+07:00) at the Rong Beer Na Lat Phrao, a beer hall and live-music venue in the Chatuchak district of Bangkok, Thailand. The fire killed 37 people and injured more than 70, of whom 24 were reported to be in critical condition. The fire was the second deadliest in Thailand since the 2009 Santika Club fire in Bangkok during New Year celebrations, which killed 67 people.	

==== Rail ====
Note: This section reports rail disasters involving at least 15 fatalities.

Event	Date	Country	Description	Ref.
2020 Aurangabad railway accident	8 May 2020	India	An empty goods train collided with a group of 20 migrant workers who were sleeping on or near the tracks in Aurangabad, Maharashtra, killing 16 people and injuring 1 other. The workers were on the tracks after losing their jobs due to the national lockdown caused by the COVID-19 pandemic.	
2021 Sohag train collision	26 March 2021	Egypt	Two commuter trains collided in the Tahta district of the Sohag Governorate after one or multiple passengers activated the emergency breaks on the leading train, which caused it to get hit. The resulting collision killed 18 people and injured an additional 200 others.	
2021 Hualien train derailment	2 April 2021	Taiwan	A Taroko Express train in Hualien County, Taiwan collided with a construction truck that had rolled onto the tracks, causing the train to derail. Of the 494 passengers on board, the accident resulted in 49 deaths and 202 injured, making it Taiwan's deadliest railway accidents. The driver of the truck was sentenced to multiple years in prison, with his contractors also order to pay NT$23 million in compensation.	
2021 Toukh train accident	18 April 2021	Egypt	A train derailed in Toukh in the Qalyubiyya Governorate, killing 23 people and injuring 139 others. A commission formed under the orders of president Abdel Fattah el-Sisi to determine the cause of the accident. The following investigation resulted in the firing of the head of the Egyptian railway authority.	
2021 Mexico City Metro overpass collapse	3 May 2021	Mexico	A girder overpass in Tláhuac, Mexico City serving the Mexico City Metro collapsed beneath a passing commuter train, killing 26 people and injuring 98 others, becoming the deadliest accident in the Metro's history in nearly 50 years. The cause of the accident was determined to stem from welding defects and a lack of foundational studs causing fatigue in the overall structure of the collapse point, indicating a lack of quality standards during construction. 10 former officials were charged for the accident and awaiting trial.	
2021 Ghotki rail crash	7 June 2021	Pakistan	A passenger express train derailed onto the opposite track near Daharki, in the Ghotki District of the province of Sindh, causing the train to collide with a second express train. Of the 1,208 passengers on board, 65 passengers were killed and around 150 others were injured. The initial derailment was determined to have been caused by a welding joint failure on the track.	
2022 Lualaba train accident	11 March 2022	Democratic Republic of the Congo	A freight train carrying hundreds of stowaways travelling towards the village of Buyofwe in the Lualaba Province derailed, causing several train cars to fall into a ravine. The derailment resulted in the deaths of 75 people and 125 others being injured.	
2023 Tempi train crash	28 February 2023	Greece	Two trains collide near the south of the Tempe Valley in Greece killing at least 57 people. It is the deadliest rail disaster in Greek history. As a result, Transport Minister Kostas Karamanlis resigned, while various protests took place across the country.	
2023 Odisha train collision	2 June 2023	India	A Coromandel Express passenger train collided with a stationary goods train near Bahanaga Bazar railway station, causing many of the cars on the passenger train to derail and collide with another oncoming Coromandel Express passenger train. The three train collision resulted in 296 people being killed and over 1,200 people being injured. Following an investigation into the accident, the cause of the collision was determined to be an error with railway signalling which caused a change in the electronic interlocking. Three railway officials were arrested who were believed to be responsible.	
2023 Hazara Express derailment	6 August 2023	Pakistan	A Hazara Express passenger train derailed in Nawabshah, in Sindh, resulting at least 30 deaths and over 100 injuries. According to Khawaja Saad Rafique, Pakistan's Ministry of Railways, the derailment was caused by a damaged segment of track and two stuck wheels.	
2023 Dhaka rail collision	23 October 2023	Bangladesh	In Bhairab, Dhaka, a passenger train and a freight train collided, killing between 17 and 20 passengers and injuring 50 others. The cause of the accident has been cited to poor rail infrastructure and a signal error.	
2025 Ascensor da Glória derailment	3 September 2025	Portugal	A car of the Portuguese funicular-tram line Ascensor da Glória derailed and crashed in the capital city of Lisbon. Of the around 40 occupants, the crash resulted in 16 deaths and 23 injuries. Initial investigations cited the cause of the crash to be the snapping of an improperly applied cable due to fatigue, as well as the car's brake systems failing.	
2025 Shinile train collision	20 October 2025	Ethiopia	In the town of Shinile near the city of Dire Dawa, a passenger train collided with a stationary train, causing many carriages to become overturned or crushed. The accident caused the deaths of 15 passengers and between 27 and 29 injuries. The crash was attributed to the passenger train being poorly maintained and overloaded with passengers.	
2026 Sikhio train disaster	14 January 2026	Thailand	A construction crane collapsed onto a passenger express train in the Sikhio district of the Nakhon Ratchasima province, resulting in the deaths of 30 passengers and injuries to 69 others of the 157 total passengers on board. Initial investigations pointed to the crane suffering a structural failure due to a loss of balance, as the main cause, whilst adding that it should have been only been operating when no trains were running.	
2026 Adamuz rail disaster	18 January 2026	Spain	A high-speed passenger train derailed in the municipality of Adamuz, in the province of Córdoba, Spain. A second train crashed into it and was also derailed. The incident killed 45 people and injured 292 others, including 15 in critical condition. The crash was Spain's worst railway disaster since the Santiago de Compostela derailment in 2013, and the fourth deadliest railway accident ever recorded in the country.	

=== Natural disasters ===
==== Earthquakes and tsunamis ====
Note: This table is a chronological list of earthquakes reported with 7.5M_{w} or greater or that have reported at least 100 fatalities.

Event	Date	Country	Description	Ref.
2020 Caribbean earthquake	28 January 2020	CARICOM, multiple countries	A 7.7M_{w} struck in the Caribbean Sea between Jamaica and Cuba at 14:10 local time on 28 January 2020. The earthquake was also felt in the United States, Mexico, Honduras, Dominican Republic, and the Cayman Islands. No damages were reported. A small (12.2 cm) tsunami was reported in the Cayman Islands.	
2020 Aegean Sea earthquake	30 October 2020	Greece; Turkey	A 7.0 M_{w} earthquake occurred about 14 km (8.7 mi) northeast of the Greek island of Samos, causing 119 deaths.	
2021 West Sulawesi earthquake	15 January 2021	Indonesia	A 6.2 M_{w} earthquake struck the Indonesian province of West Sulawesi, killing a minimum of 105 people.	
2021 Haiti earthquake	14 August 2021	Haiti	A 7.2 M_{w} earthquake struck Haiti on 14 August 2021, resulting in at least 2,207 deaths.	
June 2022 Afghanistan earthquake	22 June 2022	Afghanistan; Pakistan	A 6.2 M_{w} earthquake struck southeastern Afghanistan, killing at least 1,163 people, with 1,150 in Afghanistan and 13 in Pakistan. The earthquake was so deadly because it hit a densely populated area with buildings too weak to resist earthquakes.	
2022 West Java earthquake	21 November 2022	Indonesia	A 5.6 M_{w} earthquake struck Indonesia in West Java, near Cianjur, killing 335–635 people, despite its moderate magnitude.	
2023 Turkey–Syria earthquake	6 February 2023	Syria; Turkey	A 7.8 M_{w} earthquake struck the Border Region of Turkey and Syria, killing more than 60,000 people and injuring more than 180,000 people. It is also one of the strongest earthquakes ever recorded in Turkey since the 1999 İzmit earthquake.	
2023 Marrakesh-Safi earthquake	8 September 2023	Morocco	A 6.8 M_{ww} – 6.9 M_{w} earthquake struck the Marrakesh-Safi region of Morocco. 2,960 people killed and 5,674 injured.	
2023 Herat earthquakes	7–15 October 2023	Afghanistan	Four 6.3 M_{ww} earthquakes struck Herat Province in western Afghanistan between 7–15 October 2023, killing 1,489 people and injuring 1,853 others, while 485 remain missing.	
2024 Noto earthquake	1 January 2024	Japan	A 7.5 M_{w} (7.6 M_{JMA}) earthquake struck the Noto Peninsula of Japan, killing at least 202 people and injuring at least 665 others.	
2024 Hualien earthquake	3 April 2024	Taiwan	A 7.4 M_{w} earthquake struck 18 km (11 mi) south-southwest of Hualien City, Taiwan, leaving 10 dead and 1,011 injured.	
2025 Tibet earthquake	7 January 2025	China	A 7.1 M_{w} earthquake struck Tingri County, located in the Shigatse prefecture-level city of the Tibet Autonomous Region of Southwestern China. Between 126 and 400 people were killed and 338 were injured in the region. The earthquake also injured 13 people in Nepal and caused minor damage in Northern India. Shaking was felt across South Asia. The earthquake was the largest in China since the Maduo earthquake in May 2021 and the deadliest since the Jishishan earthquake in December 2023.	
2025 Myanmar earthquake	28 March 2025	Myanmar; Thailand	A 7.7 M_{w} earthquake struck Sagaing Region of Myanmar, with an epicentre close to Mandalay and in neighbouring Thailand, leaving more than 5,700 deaths, 630 missing, and 12,300 injured, it became one of the worst earthquakes in Southeast Asia since the 2004 Indian Ocean earthquake and tsunami.	
2025 Istanbul earthquake	23 April 2025	Turkey	A 6.4 M_{w} earthquake struck the Marmara region including Istanbul, at least 360 injuries and moderate damage was recorded. It was the biggest one to strike the North Anatolian Fault since the 1999 Düzce earthquake, and the most powerful in the Sea of Marmara region since the 1999 İzmit earthquake.	
2025 Kamchatka earthquake	30 July 2025	Russia	An 8.8 M_{w} megathrust earthquake struck off the eastern coast of the Kamchatka Peninsula in Russia. It is the most powerful earthquake recorded since the 2011 Tōhoku earthquake in Japan.	
2025 Kunar earthquake	31 August 2025	Afghanistan	A 6.0 M_{w} earthquake struck the Nangarhar and Kunar provinces of Afghanistan, near the border with Pakistan. At least 1,124 people were killed with more than 3,500 others injured.	
2025 Cebu earthquake	30 September 2025	Philippines	A 6.9 M_{w} earthquake struck the northern Visayas archipelago, including Bogo City, San Remigio, and other provinces in the Philippines. 79 deaths and 1,271 injuries were recorded.	
2026 Mindanao and Central Sulawesi earthquakes	8–16 June 2026	Indonesia; Philippines	A 7.8 M_{w} and 6.6 M_{w} earthquake struck Indonesia and the Philippines, with an epicentre was off the coast of Sarangani province in the region of Soccsksargen, 43 kilometres ESE of Palu, and in neighbouring countries across Oceania, East, and Southeast Asia, leaving about 70 deaths, 35 missing, and 1,500 injured, it became one of the strongest earthquakes to hit the Philippines since the 1976 Moro Gulf earthquake, which resulted the storm and landslides in the entire island, since the 2025 Myanmar earthquake and Thailand wildfires.	
2026 Venezuela earthquakes	24 June 2026	Venezuela	A doublet earthquake struck northwestern and central Venezuela. The epicenters of both earthquakes was in San Felipe, Yaracuy. The first earthquake, which measured M_{w} 7.2 and M_{w} 7.5 mainshocks. Both earthquakes caused widespread damage across the country, particularly in La Guaira and Caracas. At least 3,800 people were killed, more than 18,000 were injured, and over 50,000 were reported missing. The mainshock became the strongest since the 1900 San Narciso earthquake, and the third deadliest in Venezuela since 1812 Caracas and 1853 Cumaná earthquakes.	
2026 Kumamoto earthquake	28 July 2026	Japan	A 6.8 M_{w} earthquake struck Kumamoto Prefecture in southern Japan, it was the second strongest earthquake in the Kyushu region after the 2016 Kumamoto earthquakes. According to the Japan Meteorological Agency, the affected area is about 900 km (540 mi) southwest of Tokyo. A tsunami advisory for the Ariake and Yatsushiro Seas on the western coasts of Kumamoto prefecture and three neighbouring prefectures was lifted within two hours.	
2026 Colombia earthquake	10 August 2026	Colombia	A 7.4 M_{w} earthquake struck in Chocó Department, 20 km from San José del Palmar, killing at least 294 people, injuring more than 4,100 others, leaving more than 140 confirmed missing and causing extensive damage across the country. The earthquake was felt across much of western and central Colombia and in parts of neighbouring Ecuador and Panama, and caused extensive damage in Cali, Pereira, Quibdó, Manizales and other areas.	
2026 East Nusa Tenggara earthquake	15 August 2026	Indonesia	A 7.7 M_{w} earthquake struck off the coast of the island of Flores in East Nusa Tenggara, Indonesia. At least 68 people were killed and 213 others were injured. It was the strongest in the island since the 1992 Flores earthquake and tsunami and 5 August 2018 Lombok earthquake.	

==== Tropical cyclones ====
Event	Date	Country	Description	Ref.
Cyclone Amphan	16–21 May 2020	Bangladesh; Bhutan; India; Sri Lanka; Myanmar	128 people were killed and millions made homeless in the strongest storm in two decades. Damage was estimated at US$13.2 billion.	
Hurricane Laura	20–29 August 2020	United States; Haiti; Dominican Republic; Cuba; Cayman Islands; Guadeloupe; Saba; Sint Eustatius; Sint Maarten	Hurricane Laura was a deadly and destructive Category 4 hurricane that, along with 1856's Last Island and 2021's Ida, was the strongest hurricane to make landfall in the US state of Louisiana, based on maximum wind strength. "Laura" first hit the Lesser Antilles as a tropical storm, striking Puerto Rico, then moved across the island of Hispaniola, killing 31 people in Haiti and nine in the Dominican Republic. "Laura" caused widespread devastation along most of its track: Tropical-storm-force winds passed over nearly all of the Antilles islands; hurricane-force and tropical-storm-force winds struck parts of Florida, Louisiana, Texas, Mississippi, and Arkansas; and much of the storm's track was affected by flooding rain and storm surge. Damage is estimated at more than $19.1 billion, and at least 81 people were killed, including 30 in Louisiana and 10 in Texas alone, making "Laura" the 16th costliest hurricane ever. With estimated agricultural losses of $1.6 billion, "Laura" caused more agricultural damage in Louisiana than Hurricanes Katrina and Rita combined.	
Tropical Storm Linfa	6–12 October 2020	Vietnam; Cambodia; Laos; Philippines; Myanmar; Thailand	Tropical Storm Linfa was a weak, short-lived, but deadly and destructive tropical cyclone. It was the 12th wettest tropical cyclone on record and the second of nine consecutive tropical cyclones to strike Vietnam in 2020, barely a month after the less damaging Tropical Storm Noul. "Linfa" brought record-breaking rainfall totals to much of the Indochinese peninsula. 112 people died in Vietnam, and 24 are missing. Another 25 people died in Cambodia, and Laos had one death and three missing.	
Hurricane Eta and Iota	31 October – 18 November 2020	Nicaragua; Honduras	A total of 278+ people were killed during both Hurricane Eta and Hurricane Iota in Nicaragua and Honduras. Damages totalled up to US$9.3 billion from both hurricanes.	
Cyclone Seroja	3–12 April 2021	Indonesia; East Timor; Australia	Severe tropical cyclone Seroja was the third deadliest tropical cyclone in the Australian region, after Cyclone Mahina in 1899 and the Flores Cyclone in 1973. Seroja caused flooding and landslides on a historic scale in parts of southern Indonesia and East Timor, and later made landfall in the Mid West region of Western Australia – the first cyclone to make landfall since Cyclone Elaine in 1999. At least 272 people were killed by the storm, including 183 in Indonesia, 42 in East Timor and one in Australia. At least 72 people from Indonesia and 30 from East Timor are missing.	
Cyclone Tauktae	14–19 May 2021	India; Pakistan; Sri Lanka; Maldives	This category-4 cyclone hit the western coast of India. 174 total fatalities recorded (all countries). Damages totalled up to US$2.12 billion. Other countries affected were Pakistan, Sri Lanka and Maldives.	
Hurricane Ida	26 August – 4 September 2021	United States; Venezuela; Cuba; Colombia; Jamaica; Canada; Cayman Islands	107 people were killed by "Ida", of which 87 people were killed in the United States and 20 people were killed in Venezuela. The damage amounted to up to $50 billion.	
Typhoon Rai (Odette)	12–22 December 2021	Philippines; Vietnam; Indonesia; Micronesia; Palau; Hong Kong; Macau; China; Taiwan	Typhoon Rai, known in the Philippines as Super Typhoon Odette, was the second most severe typhoon in Philippine history after Typhoon Haiyan in 2013. Rai was a strong, rare tropical cyclone that struck the Philippines in December 2021. Rai was the first category 5 super typhoon since Nock-ten in 2016 to develop in December, and the third category 5 super typhoon recorded in the South China Sea, following Pamela in 1954 and Rammasun in 2014. Several southern provinces in the Philippines were inundated and devastated by the typhoon. A total of 410 people died + 80 missing, of which a full 409 died in the Philippines and only 1 died in Vietnam. The damage amounts to up to $720 million.	
Tropical Storm Ana	20–25 January 2022	Madagascar; Malawi; Mozambique; Mauritius; South Africa; Zambia; Zimbabwe	Moderate Tropical Storm Ana was a deadly tropical cyclone that struck the African nations of Madagascar, Malawi, Mozambique + others and was the third deadliest tropical cyclone of 2022. It resulted in 142 deaths, with Madagascar being the hardest hit with 58 deaths due to flooding caused by "Ana", Malawi with 37 deaths + 22 missing, and Mozambique with 20 deaths.	
Cyclone Batsirai	24 January – 11 February 2022	Madagascar; Mauritius; Réunion	Intense Tropical Cyclone Batsirai was a deadly tropical cyclone that hit Madagascar hard in February 2022 and was the strongest tropical cyclone to hit Madagascar since Cyclone Enawo in 2017. It hit the country two weeks after Tropical Storm Ana brought deadly flooding to the island nation in late January. The storm also caused damage in Mauritius and Réunion, but the damage was relatively minor. 123 deaths – 121 in Madagascar and 2 in Mauritius – were reported as a result of Batsirai. Batsirai brought severe damage that significantly affected power supply and communications in the affected areas. Entire towns were devastated, and thousands of buildings were damaged or destroyed. At least 112,000 people were displaced and 124,000 homes damaged by Batsirai. The same areas were hit by an even stronger Cyclone Freddy less than a year later.	
Tropical Storm Nalgae (Paeng)	26 October – 3 November 2022	Philippines; Hong Kong; Macau; China	Severe Tropical Storm Nalgae, known in the Philippines as Severe Tropical Storm Paeng, was a very large and deadly tropical cyclone that wreaked havoc in the Philippines and later hit Hong Kong and Macau. 160 people were killed, 141 others were wounded, and 29 people are still missing as a result of the landslides and flooding caused by Nalgae in the Philippines. Meanwhile, there was only 1 person injured in Hong Kong.	
Cyclone Freddy	4 February – 15 March 2023	Eswatini; Madagascar; Malawi; Mauritius; Mozambique; Réunion; South Africa; Zambia; Zimbabwe	Cyclone Freddy was the longest-lasting tropical cyclone in history, surpassing the previous record set by Hurricane John in 1994. In total, more than 1,434 people died + 556 went missing, with Malawi worst hit with 1,216 dead + 537 missing, followed by Mozambique with 198 dead, Madagascar with 17 dead + 3 missing, Zimbabwe with 2 dead, and Mauritius with 1 dead + 16 missing. Overall, "Freddy" was the second deadliest tropical cyclone in the southwestern Indian Ocean and third deadliest in the Southern Hemisphere.	
Storm Daniel	4–12 September 2023	Libya; Greece; Turkey; Bulgaria; Egypt; Israel	Storm Daniel, also known as Cyclone Daniel, was the deadliest and costliest Mediterranean tropical-like cyclone in recorded history. "Storm Daniel" resulted in thousands of Deaths, most notably in the Libyan city of Derna, where torrential rains caused two dams near the city of Derna to fail.	
Typhoon Ragasa	17 September 2025	Philippines; Vietnam; China; Hong Kong; Taiwan	Typhoon Ragasa made a powerful and active tropical cyclone that severely affected the northernmost portions of Luzon in the Philippines and Hualien County in Taiwan, and is currently affecting South China, Hong Kong and Macau. It is also, so far, the most intense tropical cyclone recorded in 2025.	
Typhoon Kalmaegi	31 October – 7 November 2025	Philippines; Vietnam; Cambodia; Laos; Thailand	Typhoon Kalmaegi was a powerful, deadly, and highly destructive tropical cyclone that devastated portions of the central Philippines, particularly in Cebu, and later struck central Vietnam as one of the strongest typhoons on record in the area during early November 2025, at least 232 people dead, 543 injured and 112 others missing in the Philippines, mostly in Cebu, with 13 additional deaths in Thailand and six more in Vietnam.	
Cyclone Senyar and Ditwah	25 November – 5 December 2025	India; Indonesia; Malaysia; Sri Lanka; Thailand	Cyclone Senyar and Ditwah were a powerful, deadly, and highly destructive winter tropical cyclone that devastated in the Strait of Malacca and the Indian Ocean, later struck northern Sumatra, Southern Thailand, Sri Lanka, Peninsular Malaysia, and South India, at more than 2,400 people dead, 3,000 injured and others missing in the several regions. It was the deadliest disaster in the Indian Ocean region since Vamei in 2001 and the 2004 Indian Ocean earthquake and tsunami, and the first to form there since the beginning of reliable records.	

==== Tornadoes ====
Event	Date	Country	Description	Ref.
2021 South Moravia tornado	24 June 2021	Czech Republic	A small but significant tornado outbreak swept across the Czech Republic on 24 June, resulting in the strongest ever documented tornado in modern Czech history and the deadliest European tornado since 2001.	
Tornado outbreak of 10–11 December 2021	10—11 December 2021	United States	Tornado activity swept the southern and midwestern United States in the evening of 10 December through the following morning. Arkansas, Missouri, and Kentucky suffered extensive damage.	
Tornado outbreak of 13–16 March 2025	13—16 March 2025	United States	43 people were killed across the Midwestern and southern United States as 116 tornadoes moved through the regions. The tornado was the largest ever in March and one of the deadliest in the 2020s. It was also one of the costliest in United States history.	

==== Floods, avalanches, and mudslides ====
Note: This section reports only floods with 200 or more deaths and avalanches and landslides involving 30 or more deaths.

Event	Date	Country	Description	Ref.
2020 Neelum Valley avalanche	January 2020	Pakistan	At least 74 people were killed and several others injured in the Neelum Valley in Azad Kashmir, Pakistan, after a series of avalanches triggered by heavy snowfall destroyed and buried 84 homes and 17 shops, while dozens of other buildings were damaged.	
2020 Van avalanches	4–5 February 2020	Turkey	Two avalanches in Turkey's eastern Van Province resulted in 41 deaths and 84 injuries.	
2020 East Africa floods	March – May 2020	Kenya; Rwanda; Democratic Republic of the Congo; Ethiopia; Somalia; Uganda; Djibouti; Burundi; Tanzania	Severe flooding in 9 African countries caused more than 450 deaths and affected more than 700,000 people, mainly in Kenya and Rwanda.	
2020 Nepal floods	June – September 2020	Nepal	The rainy season and associated flooding, which has killed more than 400 people, has been described by some in Nepal as the deadliest in recent memory.	
2021 European floods	12–25 July 2021	European Union	Heavy flooding, particularly in river basins of western and central Europe, killed some 243 people and left €10 billion in damage.	
2021 Henan floods	17–31 July 2021	China	Following the highest-ever recorded rainfall in Zhengzhou, Henan Province in China, between 300 and 400 deaths along with over 800,000 people having to evacuate.	
2022 Petrópolis floods	15 February 2022	Brazil	Intense rainfall led to mudslides and flooding on 15 February, that destroyed parts of the city of Petrópolis in the Brazilian state of Rio de Janeiro and killed more than 230 people.	
2022 India-Bangladesh floods	23 May 2022–present	India; Bangladesh	Deadly floods have been hitting northeastern India and Bangladesh since May 2022, killing more than 250 people and affecting 9 million people in both countries.	
2022 Pakistan floods	14 June – October 2022	Pakistan	Floods in Pakistan have killed more than 1,000 people and it was the world's deadliest flood since the 2020 South Asian floods and described as the worst in the country's history. It was also recorded as one of the costliest natural disasters in world history.	
2022 Nigeria floods	May – October 2022	Nigeria	With more than 600 dead, the 2022 floods were the worst in the country since the floods in 2012.	
2023 Africa floods	March 2023 – December 2023	Angola; Cameroon; Democratic Republic of Congo; Ethiopia; Kenya; Madagascar; Rwanda; Sierra Leone; Somalia; South Africa; Tanzania; Uganda	Since March, more than 776 people have died in severe floods in several African countries. The worst hit was the Democratic Republic of Congo, with over 440 dead + over 2,500 missing, and Rwanda, with at least 135 dead.	
2024 Rio Grande do Sul floods	April – May 2024	Brazil	Major floods caused by heavy rains and storms that hit the Brazilian state of Rio Grande do Sul, and the adjacent Uruguayan cities of Treinta y Tres, Paysandú, Cerro Largo, and Salto. From 29 April through to May, it resulted in 181 fatalities, widespread landslides, and a dam collapse. It is considered the country's worst flooding in over 80 years.	
2024 Spanish floods	29 October – 3 November 2024	Spain	A cold drop causes torrential rains in eastern Spain, causing flooding in the Valencian Community, Castilla-La Mancha, and Andalusia. Over a year of precipitation amounts was dropped over Spain, causing 219 deaths with 93 people still missing and widespread substantial damage to buildings and streets.	
2025 Pakistan floods	June – September 2025	Pakistan	A devastating floods triggered by heavy pre-monsoon rains in June 2025 and continuing throughout the monsoon season into September. The disaster primarily affected Pakistani provinces of Khyber Pakhtunkhwa, Punjab, Sindh, Balochistan and Azad Kashmir, causing widespread casualties, infrastructure damage, and mass displacement. The Swat Valley and large parts of Punjab were among the worst-hit areas.	
July 2025 Central Texas floods	July 2025	United States	A destructive and deadly flooding took place in the Hill Country region of the US state of Texas. During the flooding, water levels along the Guadalupe River rose rapidly. As a result, at least 135 people were killed, and at least 117 died in Kerr County. The flooding was caused by a mesoscale convective vortex with enhanced tropical moisture.	
October 2025 Mexico floods and landslides	October 2025	Mexico	Severe floods and landslides caused by heavy rains attributed to remnants of storms occurred in several Mexican states, leaving at least 64 people dead, at least 257 missing, and about 100,000 houses destroyed.	
2026 Zona da Mata floods	February 2026	Brazil	Flash floods and landslides caused by extreme precipitation events occurred in the Zona da Mata region of the state of Minas Gerais, Brazil, leaving 73 people dead. The disaster is the deadliest of its type in the country since the Rio Grande do Sul floods in 2024.	
2026 Kenya floods	March 2026	Kenya	Flash flooding caused by heavy rainfall affected parts of Kenya, particularly the capital, Nairobi, killing at least 66 people. The flooding caused widespread disruption to transport and infrastructure in Nairobi, including the closure of major roads and power outages in several neighbourhods.	
2026 Nepal–Tibet floods	26 August 2026	Nepal	A mass destructive flash floods and debris flows destroyed the Gyirong checkpoint on the China–Nepal border and struck dozens of settlements along a 72 km (45 mi) stretch of the Trishuli River (Note: The Trishuli River's upper section in Nepal is also known as the Bhotekoshi River; a larger river 65 kilometres (40 mi) to the east, also named Bhotekoshi, was unaffected.) in Nepal. At least 1,259 deaths and 5,083 missing persons were confirmed in Nepal with an additional 21 dead and 541 missing in the Tibet Autonomous Region of China. The flood carried the bodies of some victims 240 km (150 mi) away into neighbouring India.	

==== Volcanic eruptions ====
Event	Date	Country	Description	Ref.
2020–2022 Taal Volcano eruptions	January 2020; July 2021; November 2021; March 2022	Philippines	On 12 January the Taal Volcano in the Philippines erupted at VEI 4 intensity, bringing intense ashfall to the surrounding areas and killing at least 3 people.	
2021 Cumbre Vieja volcanic eruption	19 September 2021 – 13 December 2021	Spain	On 19 September the Cumbre Vieja volcano located in the La Palma island erupted.	
2021 Semeru eruption	4 December 2021	Indonesia	The collapse of an unstable lava dome on the summit of Semeru due to heavy rainfall triggered large pyroclastic flows, killing 48, injuring over 100 and leaving 23 missing.	
2022 Hunga Tonga–Hunga Haʻapai eruption and tsunami	15 January 2022	Tonga	The Hunga Tonga–Hunga Haʻapai volcano in the South Pacific erupted violently on 15 January, causing tsunamis to hit Hawaii, Japan and Tonga's largest island, Tongatapu, and sent waves flooding into Nukuʻalofa. It was the largest volcanic eruption of the 21st century.	

==== Droughts, heat waves, and wildfires ====
Event	Date	Region	Description	Ref.
2018–2021 Southern African drought	October 2018 – October 2021	South Africa	An ongoing period of drought began in the country of South Africa in late October 2018 and continued into early 2021, negatively affecting food security in the region.	
2019–20 Australian bushfire season	June 2019 – May 2020	Australia	Unusually intense bushfires in Australia continued into 2020, having started in September 2019.	
2020 Western US Wildfires	March – December 2020	United States	Record-breaking wildfires began in several Western American states.	
2020 Argentine wildfires (Delta del Paraná)	July 2020 – October 2020	Argentina	Sudden wildfires started in Córdoba and extended into several Northern provinces.	
2021 Russian heatwave	May – June 2021	Russia	Parts of Russia and eastern Europe were hit by a record-breaking heat wave in May and June 2021, with temperatures in the Arctic Circle above 30 °C and the highest temperatures recorded in Moscow and St. Petersburg.	
2021 Western North America heat wave	June – July 2021	United States; Canada	Extreme temperatures caused by a prolonged heat dome over western Canada and the western United States killed over 613 people including over 480 people in British Columbia alone. The village of Lytton, British Columbia, which recorded the highest temperatures in Canada, was destroyed by a large wildfire as over 200 other ones devastated wide areas of the province. Wildfires in parts of the western coastal states of the US such as Washington, Oregon and California were also greatly worsened by the heatwave.	
2021 Turkey wildfires	July – August 2021	Turkey	Over a hundred wildfires began in the Mediterranean Region of the forest in Turkey, the worst in the country for at least a decade. The wildfires started in Manavgat, Antalya on 28 July 2021, with the temperature around 37 °C (99 °F).	
2020–2023 North American drought	August 2020 – October 2023	United States; Canada; Mexico	Drought developed in the Western, Midwestern and Northeastern United States in the summer of 2020. Over the course of 2021, conditions improved in the Northeast but worsened in the Western US. As of June 2021, 97% of the region was facing abnormally dry conditions. By August 2021, parts of the upper Midwestern US were experiencing some of the worst drought spells since the 1980s. Drought also affected a wide area of Mexico as of 2021, as well as the prairies of Canada.	
2022 European heatwaves	June – September 2022	European Union	From mid-June through most of the summer, heatwaves affected most of Europe, with western and central Europe the worst hit. Temperatures in excess of 40 °C (104 °F) were recorded in places, breaking records. Over 24,000 deaths were attributed to the event, most in France, Spain, Germany, the United Kingdom, and Portugal. The heatwaves contributed to wildfires and drought also seen in Europe.	
2022 European and Mediterranean wildfires	May – September 2022	European Union; Algeria; Morocco; Tunisia	Wildfires across Europe, North Africa and the Mediterranean region.	
2022 European drought	July – September 2022	European Union	Europe's worst drought year in 500 years. A report from the Global Drought Observatory confirmed this.	
2023 Canadian wildfires	March – November 2023	Canada	The 2023 wildfire season is the worst wildfire season in Canada's modern history.	
2023 Hawaii wildfires	8 – 16 August 2023	United States	Wind-driven fires caused widespread damage on the island of Maui, and killed at least 111 people in the town of Lāhainā.	
2023 Greece wildfires	17 July – 9 September 2023	Greece	Over 80 fires in Greece led to the deaths of at least 28 and the evacuation of 20,000 people.	
January 2025 Southern California wildfires	7 – 31 January 2025	United States	Wildfires have affected Greater Los Angeles and surrounding regions.	
Ōfunato wildfire	26 February – 10 March 2025	Japan	Wildfires have affected Iwate Prefecture and surrounding regions.	
2025 South Korea wildfires	21 March – 18 May 2025	South Korea	Wildfires have affected central and southern locations, it has been worst wildfires in history.	
2025 Northeast Thailand wildfires	26 March – 6 May 2025	Thailand	Wildfires have affected Isan regional provinces such as Udon Thani, Nong Bua Lamphu, Kalasin, and Khon Kaen provinces.	
2025 Israel–West Bank fires	30 April – 3 May 2025	Israel	Wildfires have affected around Jerusalem, in at least 100 different locations through the Judean Mountains area.	
2026 European heatwaves and wildfires	May – September 2026	European Union	Since late May 2026, Europe has been struck by severe heatwaves. Temperature records have been broken in several European countries, with temperatures higher than normal, resulting several deaths including heatstroke and drownings.Wildfires across Europe began with Almería and a majority in Gironde, it was affected by 2026 European heatwaves are thought to have been in part caused by the El Niño. Several wildfires in the Ávila and Madrid provinces, about 50 km west from the city of Madrid, merged into a single blaze. The wildfire, which had burned 15,000, as well in Gironde, had burnt close to 20,000 hectares and was nearby Bordeaux.	
2026 Kyushu wildfires	29 July 2026–present	Japan	A destructive willdfires have affected two prefectures in Kyushu such as Kumamoto and Miyazaki Prefectures, The wildfires have been deemed the worst-ever in the aftermath of a major earthquake and impacted by the heatwaves since Otsuchi in April.	

==== Biological disasters ====
Event	Date	Country	Description
2022 Oder environmental disaster	July – August 2022	Poland; Germany	A mass fish kill occurs in the river Oder in Poland and Germany attributed to an algal bloom.

==== Other natural events ====
Beginning in 2019 until 2022, a huge swarm of desert locusts threatened to engulf massive portions of the Middle East, Africa and Asia.

== Economics ==
Economic indexes by country

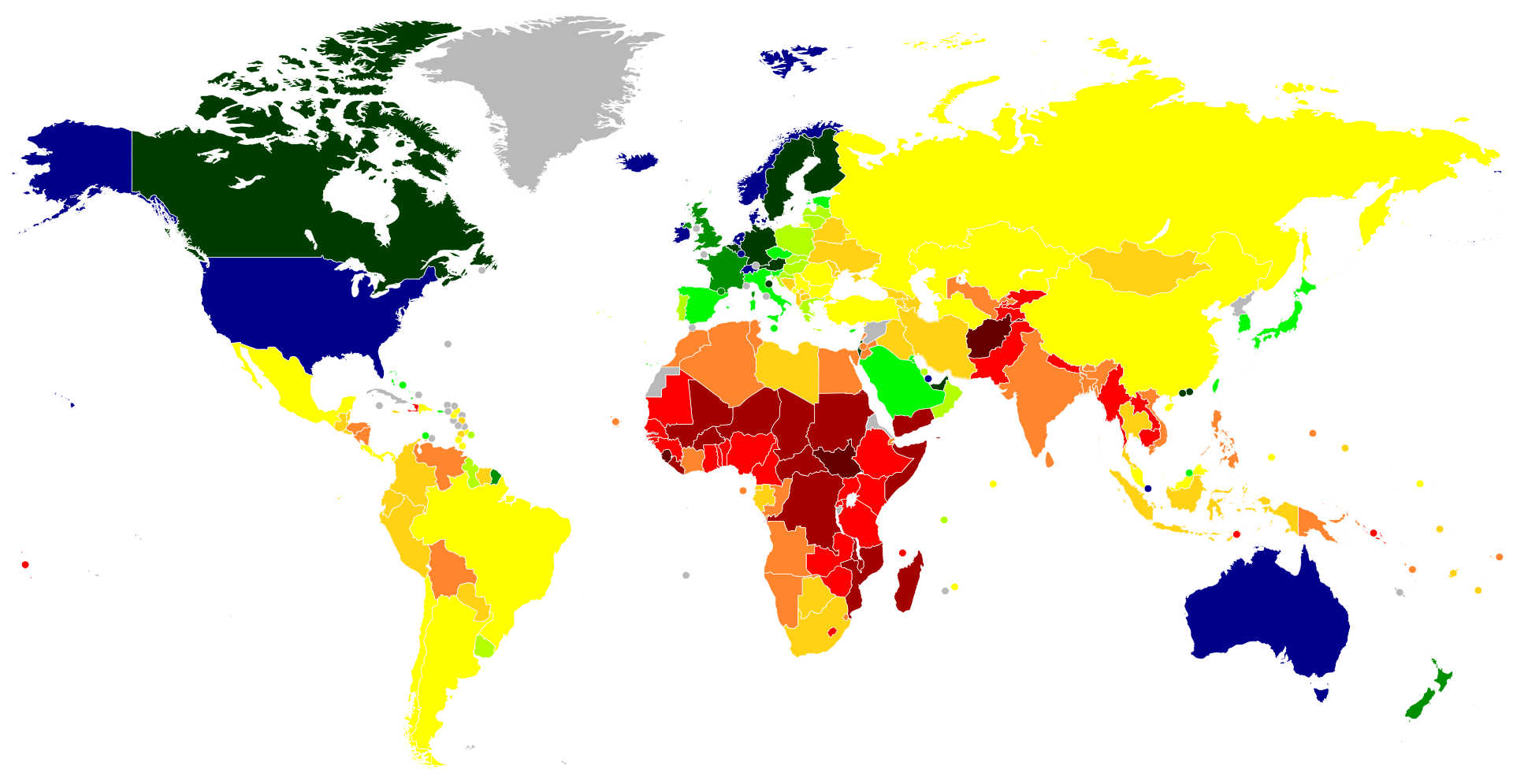
The 2025 IMF list of countries by GDP (nominal) and per capita

The 2020s were marked by economic troubles, beginning from the COVID-19 recession was a major global economic crisis which has caused both a recession in some nations, and in others a depression. The economic crisis began due to the economic consequences of the COVID-19 pandemic. The first major sign of a recession was the collapse of markets during the 2020 stock market crash, which began in late February and lasted through March. As of September 2020, every advanced economy is in a recession or depression, whilst all emerging economies are in recession. modelling by the World Bank suggests that in some regions a full recovery will not be achieved until 2025 or beyond.

Due to the 2021–2023 inflation surge, many countries reported the highest inflation rates in decades. The inflation surge has been attributed to various causes, including pandemic-related economic dislocation; the fiscal and monetary stimulus provided in 2020 and 2021 by governments and central banks around the world in response to the pandemic were also instrumental. The effect of the 2022 Russian invasion of Ukraine on global oil prices, natural gas, fertilizer, and food prices further exacerbated the situation. Higher gasoline prices were a major contributor to inflation as oil producers saw record profits. Debate arose over whether inflationary pressures were transitory or persistent, and to what extent price gouging was a factor. The closure of the Strait of Hormuz due to the 2026 Iran war caused the largest oil price increases since 2022. Stock markets experienced declines, with the Dow Jones Industrial Average falling over 400 points on 2 March. Broader economic forecasts warned of inflationary pressures and slowed global growth if the conflict prolonged.

American technology billionaires are largely the wealthiest individuals in the world, including Elon Musk (the wealthiest person as of 2026), Larry Ellison, Mark Zuckerberg, Jeff Bezos, and Jensen Huang. Jensen Huang is the CEO of Nvidia, the most valuable company in the world, and the wealthiest person of Asian descent. Alice Walton is the wealthiest woman in the world. In 2026, Elon Musk became the first person to reach a net worth of $1 trillion. Tesla shareholders approved a $1 trillion pay plan for Musk in November 2025, provided Tesla achieves certain financial milestones.

Several countries from the Balkans have now reached the status of developed countries with high-income economies, such as Romania, Bulgaria and Croatia. All three of them have joined the open-borders Schengen Area this decade, with Bulgaria and Croatia also joining the Eurozone, thus adopting the Euro as their sole legal currency. The economy of Greece has also been slowly recovering from the Greek government-debt crisis of the 2010s, with its economy being reclassified as a developed market in 2025. The recent economic advancements from this region now mean that every single country in the European Union is now considered developed.

=== Trade ===
A map of countries by total baseline American tariffs (includes tariffs not yet implemented): 100% or higher; 50% – 99%; 40% – 49%; 30% – 39%; 20% – 29%; 10% – 19% United States

The World Trade Organization reported that trade growth had stagnated and that trade restrictions were increasing as the decade began. The sectors most affected by import restrictions were mineral and fuel oils (17.7%), machinery and mechanical appliances (13%), electrical machinery and parts (11.7%), and precious metals (6%). Regional trade agreements were also found to be increasing.

United States president Donald Trump announced 2 April 2025 to be "liberation day", beginning to enforce tariffs on numerous nations in the following week. This triggered an ongoing economic trade war as well as the 2025 stock market crash. It is currently the largest decline in the global stock market since the 2020 stock market crash, which was part of a recession caused by the COVID-19 pandemic. From January to April 2025, the average applied US tariff rate rose from 2.5% to an estimated 27%—the highest level in over a century. The Supreme Court of the United States heard the case Learning Resources v. Trump on 5 November 2025 to determine the legality of some of Trump's tariffs. On 20 February 2026, the Supreme Court struck down many of Trump's tariffs.

Trump's tariffs represented a repudiation of neoliberalism and free trade, instead returning to mercantilism and protectionism. Tariffs have a long history in the United States, dating back to the Import-Export Clause of the US Constitution and even the Navigation Acts when the United States was a British colony.

The Israeli–United States war against Iran in 2026 caused the closure of the Strait of Hormuz to maritime shipping, impacting about 20% of global oil and liquefied natural gas production. It became the largest energy market disruption since the 1970s energy crisis, and the largest disruption of the global oil market in history, surpassing the Yom Kippur War in 1973 and the Russian invasion of Ukraine in 2022.

== Health ==
=== Epidemics/Outbreaks ===
Event	Date	Infections and deaths	Description
2022–2023 mpox outbreak	6 May 2022 – 11 May 2023	86,494 confirmed cases and 280 deaths in 109 countries and territories reported by 26 March 2023.	First international outbreak cluster detected on 6 May 2022 in London, UK. Declared a public health emergency of international concern by WHO from 23 July 2022 to 11 May 2023.

=== Pandemics ===
Event	Date	Infections and deaths	Description
COVID-19 pandemic	2019 – 2023	678.1 million+ confirmed cases and 6.7 million+ deaths with more than 240 countries and territories reported by 16 February 2023.	First confirmed case detected on 17 November 2019 in Wuhan, China. Declared a public health emergency of international concern by WHO from 30 January 2020 to 5 May 2023.
HIV/AIDS	1981–present	In 2025, an estimated 41.0 million people worldwide were living with HIV, 32.1 million people were receiving antiretroviral therapy, and 570,000 people died from AIDS-related illnesses. Since the beginning of the epidemic, an estimated 44.2 million people have died from AIDS-related illnesses.	

== Science and technology ==
Below are the most significant scientific developments of each year, based on the annual Breakthrough of the Year award of the American Association for the Advancement of Science journal Science.

- 2020: COVID-19 vaccine, developed and tested at record speed
- 2021: An AI brings protein structures to all
- 2022: James Webb Space Telescope debut
- 2023: GLP-1 Drugs anorectic drugs
- 2024: Lenacapavir antiretroviral medication used to treat and prevent HIV/AIDS
- 2025: The unstoppable rise of renewable energy

=== Artificial intelligence ===
The AI boom is an ongoing period of rapid progress in the field of artificial intelligence (AI) that started in the late 2010s before gaining international prominence throughout the 2020s with the public release of consumer-facing chatbots such as ChatGPT and DeepSeek. Examples include large language models and generative AI applications developed by OpenAI as well as protein folding prediction led by Google DeepMind. This period is sometimes referred to as an AI spring, to contrast it with previous AI winters.

- DeepMind solves the protein folding problem to 90 per cent accuracy, a 50-year-old grand challenge, at CASP14 in 2020.
- Text-to-image AI art systems such as DALL-E (1, 2, and 3) and Stable Diffusion are capable of generating highly detailed and realistic images from text prompts.
- Chatbots using fine-tuned large language models, like OpenAI's ChatGPT, Anthropic's Claude and Meta's Llama, became widely adopted in 2023 and 2024.
- In early 2024, OpenAI released a new technology called Sora, a video model that generates short video clips based on user prompts, and can also extend existing short videos. Sora was released publicly for ChatGPT Plus and ChatGPT Pro users in December 2024. This has revolutionized the video industry, since this machine generates videos in shorter time, leading to more companies adopting AI videos, with Coca-Cola being the first one to do so.

=== Communications and electronics ===
- 5G became increasingly widespread during the decade.
- By 2020, 3D printing had reached decent quality and affordable pricing which allowed many people to own 3D printers.
- The 4K and 8K resolutions become prevalent in consumer electronics.

=== Spaceflight ===
The trend towards cost reduction in access to orbit is expected to continue. Vulcan is replacing its more expensive predecessors. Since 2023, SpaceX is testing its fully reusable Starship with orbital missions. In 2025, Blue Origin conducted the maiden flight of New Glenn with a reusable first stage and Ariane 6 replaced the, retired more expensive, Ariane 5.

Mars stays a focus for missions to other planets, with three missions launched in 2020 (by China, the United Arab Emirates and the United States) and at least one mission planned for 2024, 2026 and 2028.

In 2028, as part of the NASA-ESA Mars Sample Return mission, NASA plans to launch a Sample Retrieval Lander. In 2027, ESA plans to launch the Earth Return Orbiter, which will transport the retrieved samples from Mars to Earth by 2033. China is also planning to retrieve samples from Mars by 2031.

NASA plans a return of humans to the Moon by 2028. The first uncrewed launch of the Space Launch System happened in 2022. The first crewed launch, a lunar flyby, occurred in April 2026. NASA is aiming toward a 2028 lunar landing.

India plans to launch its first crewed flight with a spacecraft called Gaganyaan on a home-grown GSLV Mark III rocket in 2025. The mission would make India the fourth nation to launch a crewed spaceflight after Russia, the US and China. India also plans to launch its second Mars probe, Mars Orbiter Mission 2 (Mangalyaan 2).

The James Webb Space Telescope was launched in 2021. NASA launched the Nancy Grace Roman Space Telescope, which has a field of view 100 times larger than that of the Hubble Space Telescope, in August 2026.

NASA's NEO Surveyor, scheduled to launch no later than June 2028, is expected to be capable of detecting at least 90% of near-Earth objects larger than 140 meters (460 ft), a goal mandated by the US Congress in 2005.

The number of small satellites launched annually was expected to grow to around one thousand (2018 estimate), mainly communication satellites in large constellations but launches quickly exceeded this estimate, mainly due to the rapid deployment of the Starlink and OneWeb constellations. From 2020 to 2022, around 3500 Starlink satellites and 500 satellites by OneWeb were launched.

The number of total satellites reached 10,000 for the first time in 2024.

=== Software and electronic platforms ===
- Support for Adobe Flash Player ended on 31 December 2020.
- Windows 11 is released on 5 October 2021, succeeding Windows 10.
- Support for Internet Explorer on Windows 10 Semi-Annual Channel (SAC) ended on 15 June 2022.
- ESU support for Windows 7 and extended support for Windows 8.1 and Windows RT ended on 10 January 2023. Some versions of Windows 10, such as Windows 10 2106 LTSB are already out of mainstream support, some versions are out of all support, and others soon on, i.e. 14 October 2025, while some Enterprise versions will be supported longer.

=== Technology ===
- The BBC reports that for the "first time someone who has had a complete cut to their spinal cord has been able to walk freely... because of an electrical implant that has been surgically attached to his spine".
- Sales of electric vehicles have grown significantly and this is expected to continue through the decade.
- NFTs as a form of digital art emerged in the 2020s, with NFTs such as Everydays: the First 5000 Days. The NFT market experienced rapid growth during 2020, with its value tripling to US$250 million. In the first three months of 2021, more than US$200 million were spent on NFTs, and in the early months of 2021, interest in NFTs increased after a number of high-profile sales and art auctions. However, by 2022 this market was in the process of rapid collapse. A report in September 2023 concluded that 95% of collected NFTs now possess zero market value, and that "79% of all NFT collections remain unsold".
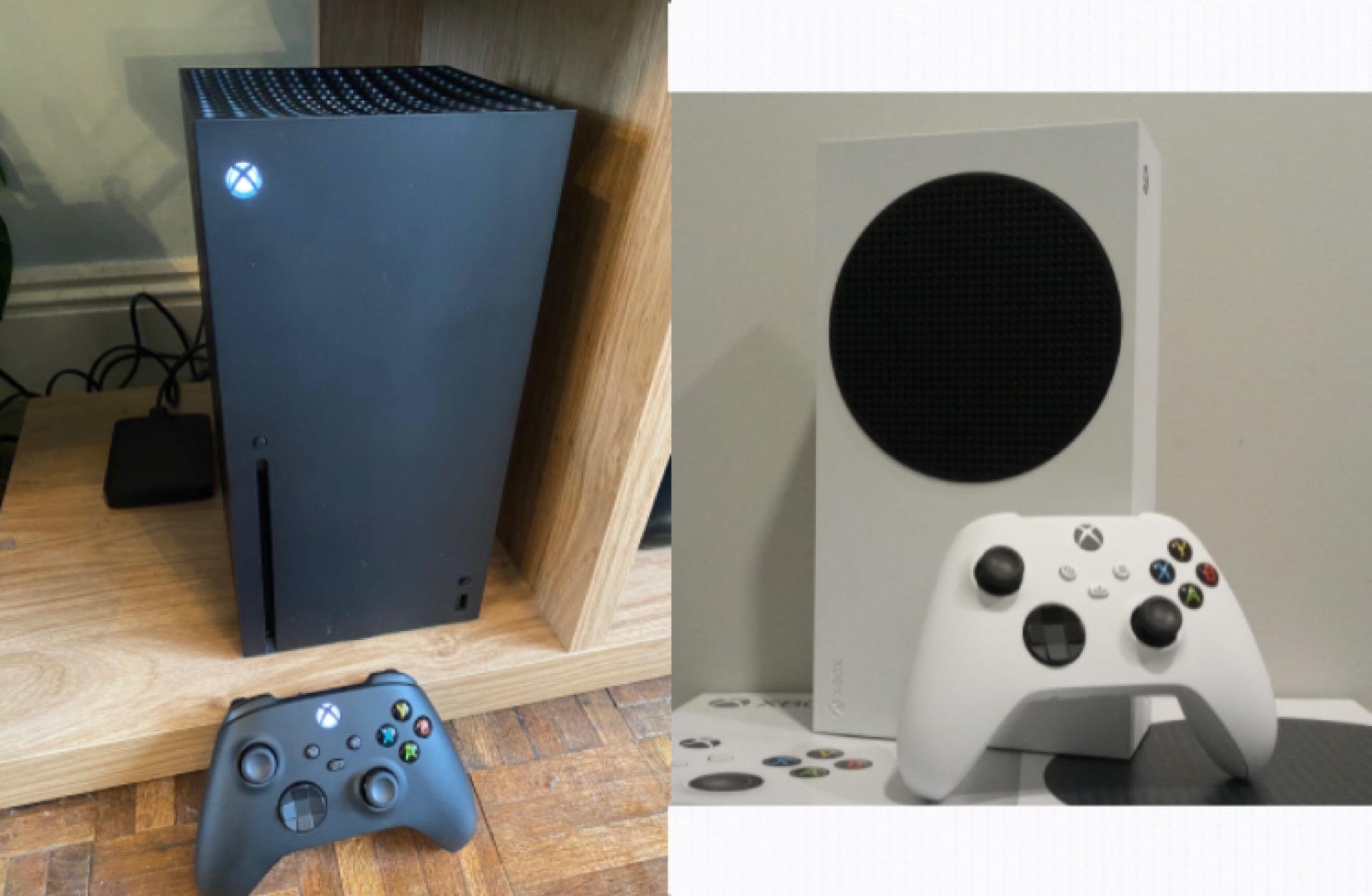
Xbox Series X and S

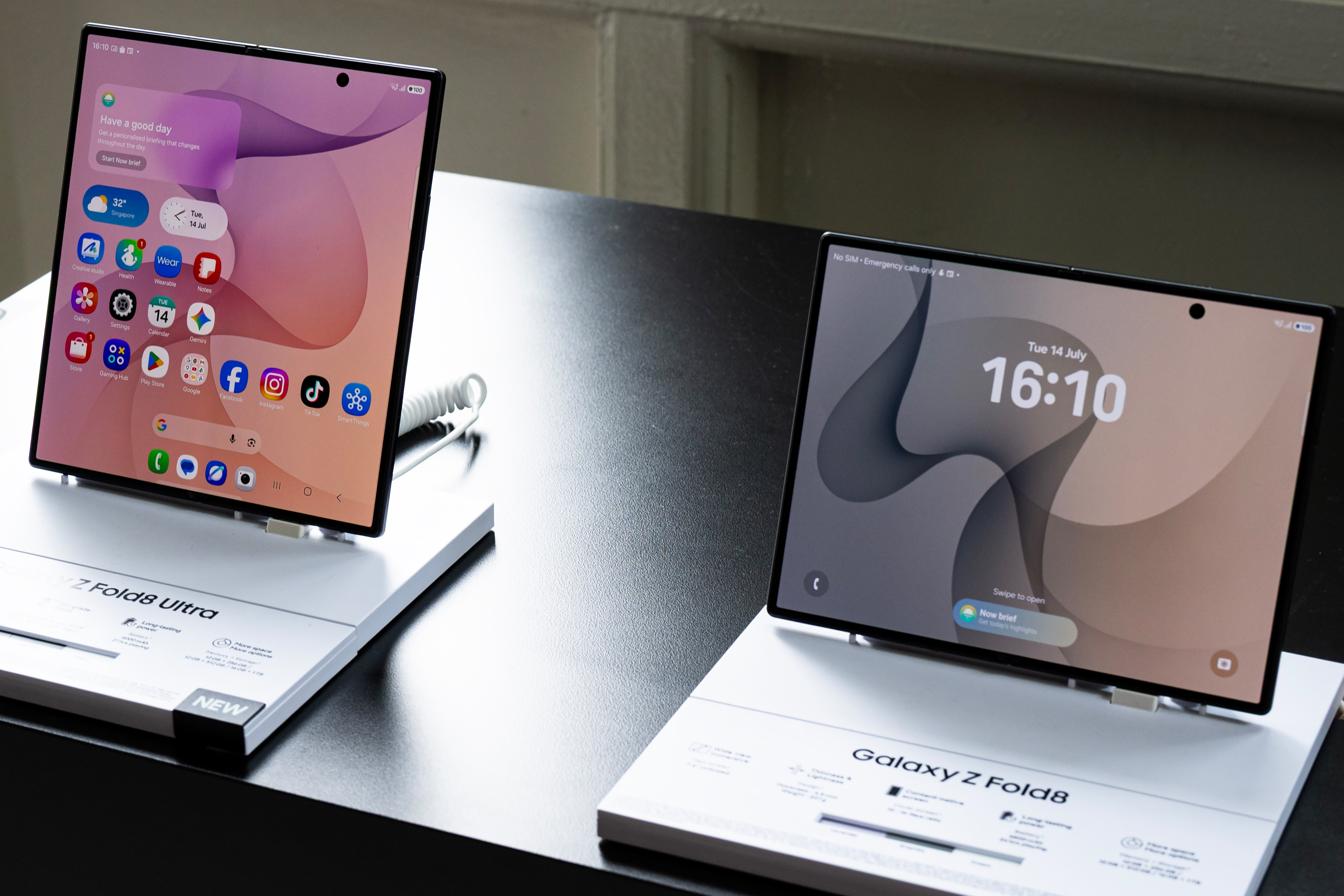
Samsung Galaxy Z Fold 8

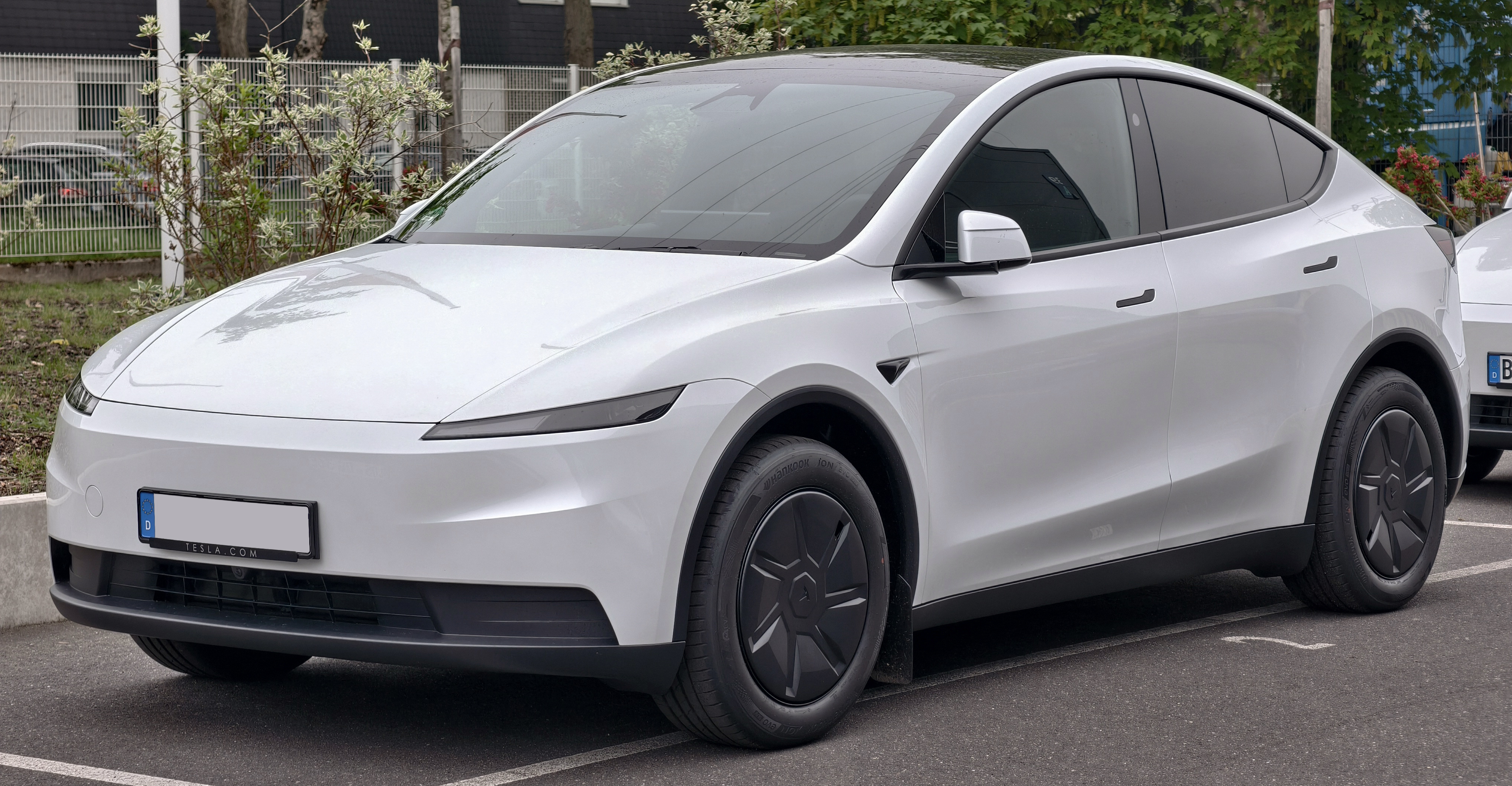
Tesla Model Y

== Society ==
=== Social effects of the COVID-19 pandemic ===
Medical experts advised, and local authorities often mandated stay-at-home orders to prevent gatherings of any size. Such gatherings would be replaced by teleconferencing, or in some cases with unconventional attempts to maintain social distancing with activities such as a balcony sing-along for a concert, or a "birthday parade" for a birthday party. Replacements for gatherings were seen as significant to mental health during the crisis. Social isolation among alcohol users also adopted a trend towards Kalsarikänni or "pantsdrunking", a Finnish antisocial drinking culture.

Low-income individuals were more likely to contract the coronavirus and to die from it. In both New York City and Barcelona, low-income neighbourhoods were disproportionately hit by coronavirus cases. Hypotheses for why this was the case included that poorer families were more likely to live in crowded housing and work in jobs deemed essential during the crisis, such as supermarkets and elder care. In the United States, millions of low-income people may lack access to health care due to being uninsured or underinsured. Millions of Americans lost their health insurance after losing their jobs. Many low-income workers in service jobs became unemployed.

The coronavirus pandemic was followed by a concern for a potential spike in suicides, exacerbated by social isolation due to quarantine and social-distancing guidelines, fear, and unemployment and financial factors. Many countries reported an increase in domestic violence and intimate partner violence attributed to lockdowns amid the COVID-19 pandemic. Financial insecurity, stress, and uncertainty led to increased aggression at home, with abusers able to control large amounts of their victims' daily life. Midlife crisis is a major concern in domestic violence, social implications and suicides for middle-aged adults amid the pandemic. UN secretary-general António Guterres called for a domestic violence and midlife crisis "ceasefire".

=== Population ===
- The population of Egypt reached 100 million in February 2020.
- The world population reached 8 billion in November 2022.
- Vietnam hit 100 million people in June 2026.
- Population growth, life expectancy and birth rates declined globally in the early 2020s, driven by the COVID-19 pandemic.
- India surpassed China and became the most-populous country in April 2023.

=== Gender ===
24.3% of all national parliamentarians were women as of February 2019. 11 women were serving as head of state and 12 as head of government in June 2019. 20.7% of government ministers were women as of January 2019. There are wide regional variations in the average percentages of women parliamentarians. As of February 2019, these were: Nordic countries, 42.5%; Americas, 30.6%; Europe excluding Nordic countries, 27.2%; sub-Saharan Africa, 23.9%; Asia, 19.8%; Arab States, 19%; and the Pacific, 16.3%. Rwanda has the highest number of women parliamentarians worldwide, 61.3% of seats in the lower house. About 26% of elected local parliamentarians are women.

Many states swore in their first female leaders during the 2020s, including presidents Katerina Sakellaropoulou (Greece), Samia Suluhu Hassan (Tanzania), Sandra Mason (Barbados), Xiomara Castro (Honduras), Katalin Novák (Hungary), Dina Boluarte (Peru), Nataša Pirc Musar (Slovenia), Gordana Siljanovska-Davkova (North Macedonia) and prime ministers Rose Christiane Raponda (Gabon), Victoire Tomegah Dogbé (Togo), Kaja Kallas (Estonia), Fiamē Naomi Mata'afa (Samoa), Robinah Nabbanja (Uganda), Najla Bouden (Tunisia), Magdalena Andersson (Sweden), Giorgia Meloni (Italy), Judith Suminwa (DRC), Chairwoman Borjana Krišto (Bosnia and Herzegovina), and Sanae Takaichi (Japan).

Despite this, nearly all of the world's wealthiest individuals (mostly American technology billionaires) are male, as are the heads of state of most countries.

=== Environmentalism ===
Renewable energy capacity additions in 2020 expanded by more than 45% from 2019, including a 90% rise in global wind capacity and a 23% expansion of new solar photovoltaic installations.

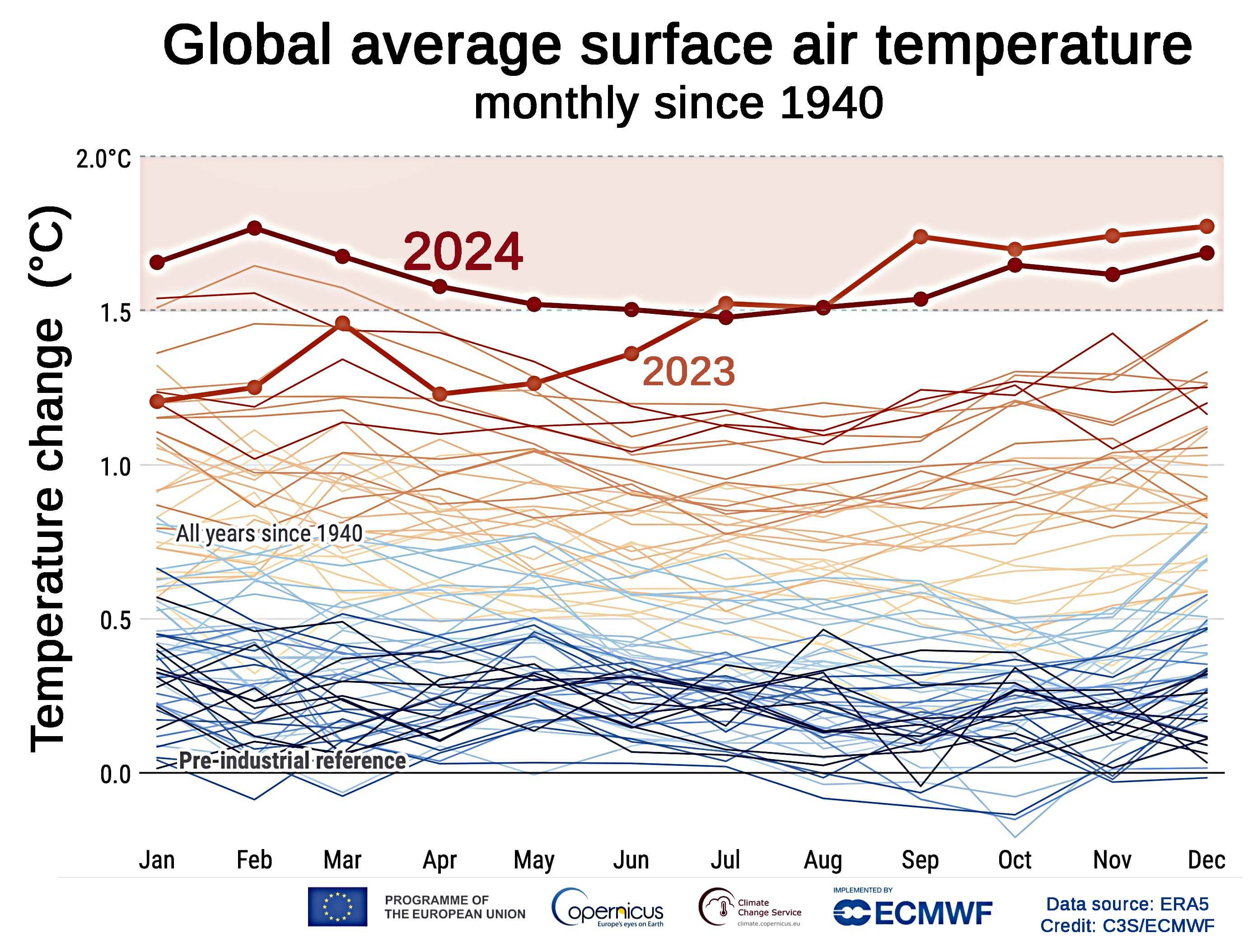
In 2024, Earth saw the highest average annual surface air temperature ever recorded, outpacing 2023 on an average basis.

The effects of climate change manifested in 2020 with a record 30 named Atlantic tropical storms and hurricanes; the highest heat in 80-years recorded at 54.4 Celsius; massive wildfires in Australia, the Western United States, and the Arctic; and the second-lowest annual Arctic sea ice coverage. The Net Zero Asset Managers initiative—involving 30 fund management companies managing $9 trillion—pledged investment portfolios to be carbon-neutral by 2050.

In July 2024, in each month in a 12-month period (through June 2024), Earth's average temperature exceeded 1.5 °C above the pre-industrial baseline, and the highest daily global average temperature is recorded at 17.09 °C (62.76 °F), surpassing the previous record of 17.08 °C (62.74 °F) on 6 July 2023.

- Team Seas is an international collaborative fundraiser founded by YouTubers Mark Rober and MrBeast on 29 October 2021, as a follow-up to Team Trees. The fundraiser's aim was to raise US$30 million to remove 30 million pounds of trash from the ocean by the end of the year. They also partnered with the Ocean Cleanup and the Ocean Conservancy.
- Members of the United Nations agree on a legal framework for the High Seas Treaty on 4 March 2023, which aims to protect 30% of the world's oceans by 2030.

=== LGBTQ rights ===
- A law allowing third gender option on driver licenses took effect in New Hampshire.
- Switzerland banned discrimination based on sexuality due to a referendum, putting into effect a law previously introduced in 2018, that was subsequently blocked by the government that requested a referendum to be held on the matter first.
- In Northern Ireland, the first same-sex marriage took place after legalising legislation took effect in January 2020.
- In Costa Rica, same-sex marriage and joint adoption by same-sex couples became legal on 26 May 2020.
- The Supreme Court of the United States ruled that job discrimination against workers for their sexual orientation or gender identity is illegal.
- In Argentina, nonbinary ID cards with an "X" gender marker started to be issued by the Ministry of the Interior.
- The U.S. State Department issued its first ever passport with an "X" gender marker in October 2021, intended to support nonbinary people.
- Same-sex marriage became legal in Switzerland after a 2021 referendum, enforced beginning in July 2022.
- In Chile, same-sex marriage and joint adoption by same-sex couples became legal on 10 March 2022.
- Same-sex marriage became legal in Slovenia on 8 July 2022 after the Constitutional Court of Slovenia ruled that the ban on same-sex marriages violated the national constitution.
- Same-sex marriage became legal in Cuba on 27 September 2022 after the Cuban Family Code referendum passed.
- By October 2022, Mexico City and all Mexican states had legalised same-sex marriage, either by legislation, executive action, or Supreme Court order.
- On 1 January 2024, same-sex marriage became legal in Estonia.

== Global goals and issues ==
Development in global goals and issues—including goals or progress related to the largest causes of human death—during the decade, according to reports that systematically track, quantify or review associated progress.

As of 2022:

- Progress of the Paris Agreement or global climate change mitigation goals
  - The United in Science 2022 report by the WMO, summarises latest climate science-related updates and assesses recent climate change mitigation progress as "going in the wrong direction".
  - A report by the World Resources Institute assesses the state of nationally determined contributions (NDCs), finding they need to be strengthened by about six times for alignment with what may be enough to reach the Paris Agreement's 1.5 °C goal. The UNFCCC's NDC synthesis report suggests that based on the latest NDCs the carbon budget for a 50% likelihood of limiting warming to 1.5 °C would be used up by around 2032.
  - A Lancet Countdown report publishes data of indicators that show "countries and companies continue to make choices that threaten the health and survival of people in every part of the world". It calls for an immediate, health-centred response at a critical juncture of recovery from crises.
  - The WMO reports atmospheric levels of the three main greenhouse gases, carbon dioxide, methane and nitrous oxide, all reached record highs, with methane concentrations showing a record jump in 2021. The WMO Secretary-General concludes that "we are heading in the wrong direction", with time "running out".
  - Climate Action Tracker systematically assesses the state of progress of actions of climate goals in an overview, finding that none of the indicators is on track to reach their 2030 targets, with insufficient speed for six indicators, and well below the required pace for 21, five heading in the wrong direction, and data being insufficient to evaluate the remaining eight.
  - The UNEP's Emissions Gap Report finds that no credible "pathway" to the 1.5 °C climate goal is in place. Similarly, a UNFCCC synthesis about "long-term low-emission development strategies" warns that many net-zero targets "remain uncertain and postpone into the future critical action that needs to take place now".
- Deforestation mitigation goals
  - An annual report by the World Resources Institute shows that tropical regions lost 9.3 million acres of primary old-growth forest in 2021, a decline of 11% from 2020, and about equal to both 2018 and 2019.
  - The Forest Declaration Assessment finds that a drop of only 6.3% in deforestation in 2021 is "leaving the world off track from its goals of ending forest loss by 2030".
- Public health goals
  - The UN's "The State of Food Security and Nutrition in the World" report finds that the number of people affected by hunger globally rose by 46 million to 828 million in 2021. 3.1 billion people could not afford a healthy diet in 2020, an increase of 112 million from 2019.
  - A WHO report indicates collective progress toward a 15% relative reduction in population levels of physical inactivity by 2030 is insufficient and that about 500 million people will develop heart disease, obesity, diabetes or other diseases if they do not increase their physical activity.
- Global budgets and government spending
  - The OECD and IEA report that global public subsidies for fossil fuels almost doubled from 2020 to $700bn in 2021.
- General well-being
  - The Club of Rome, authors of the 1972 The Limits to Growth, and research institutes like the Potsdam Institute for Climate Impact Research publish the "Earth for All" report, concluding that to increase the wellbeing of humanity, addressing rising inequality is key to mitigating related issues such as climate change with many current policies disproportionately burdening lower income groups.
- Sustainable Development Goals (other than the above or in general)
  - The only UN report that monitors global progress on the 2030 Agenda for Sustainable Development indicates the agenda is in "grave danger".
- GDP-alternative progress or sustainable development indices
  - Human Development Index (HDI): the Human Development Report 2021–22 concludes that for the first time, the global HDI value declined for a second year, with living standards declining in 90% of countries.

== Popular culture ==
The video-sharing site TikTok became a major influence on pop culture and the music industry in the early 2020s. Short-form videos have increased in viewership through Instagram Reels, Facebook Reels and YouTube Shorts during the decade.

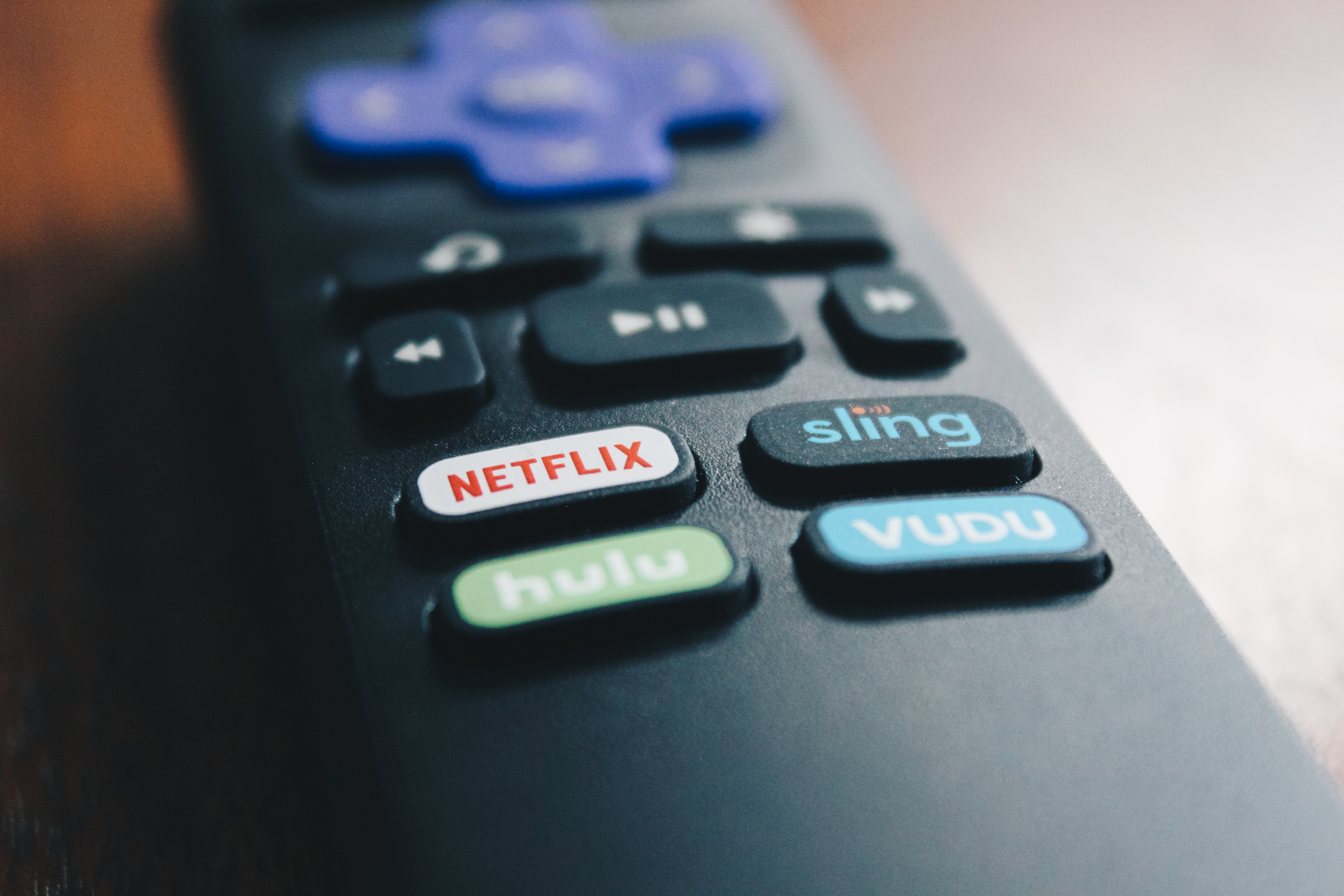
The streaming wars got bigger in the 2020s as many new streaming services such as Disney+, Apple TV+, HBO Max, and Paramount+ competed against Netflix, Hulu, and Amazon Prime Video.

The decade saw popularized TV shows of the decade such as Ted Lasso (the cast being pictured above), Squid Game, The Boys, The Mandalorian, Wednesday, Peacemaker, Shōgun, Severance, Euphoria, Abbott Elementary, Nobody Wants This, and Only Murders in the Building.

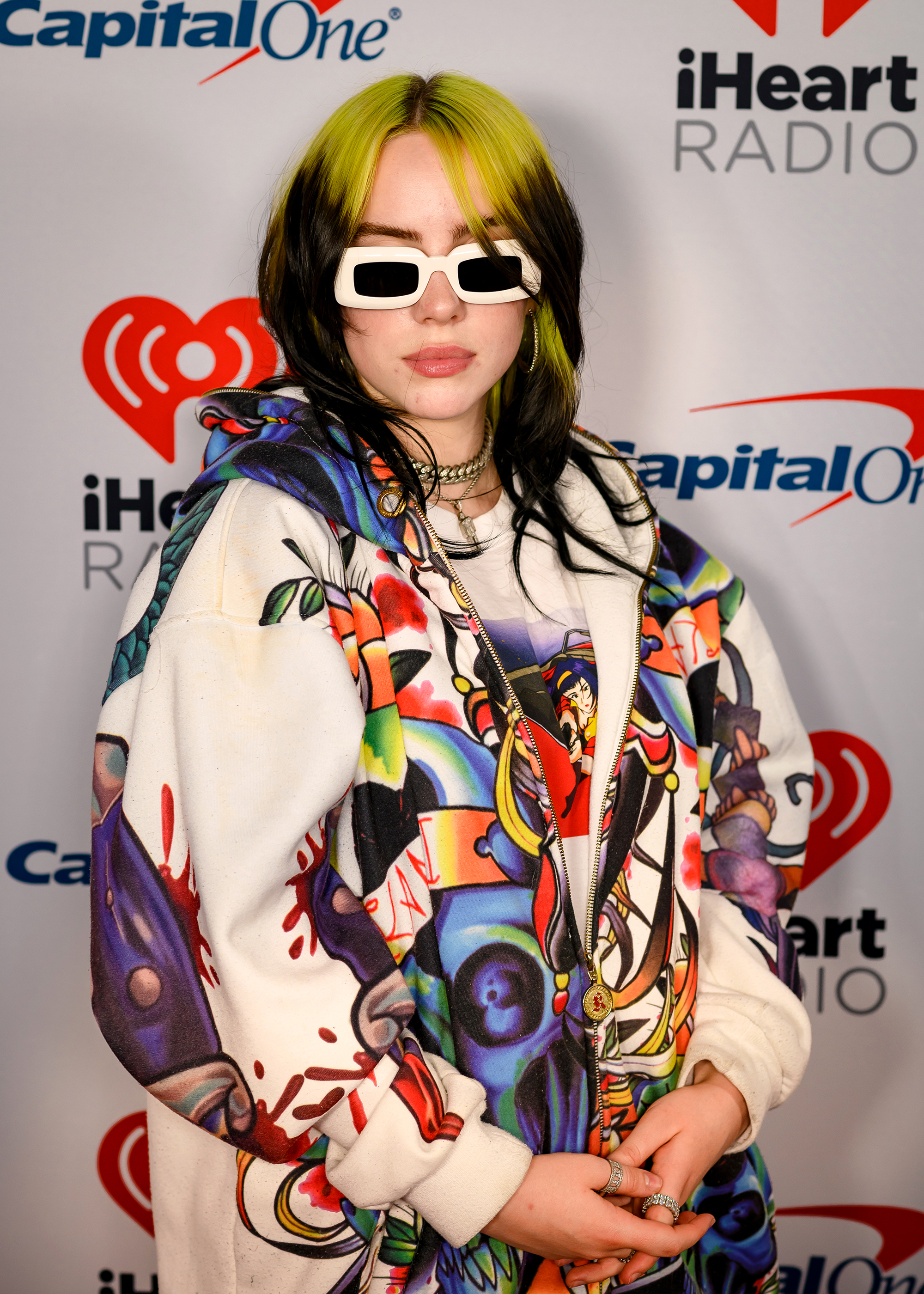
Flashy multi-colored clothing became a trend in the early 2020s, as did baggier clothing such as hoodies, modelled here by musician Billie Eilish. The 2020s revived and built upon Y2K fashion trends.

In the 2020s, multiple online food delivery services such as DoorDash, Uber Eats, Postmates, Grubhub, and Just Eat Takeaway became popular, becoming popular during and after the COVID-19 pandemic. Food delivery robots also became popular in the 2020s and were finally to the point they could be used to deliver food around larger areas such as college campuses.

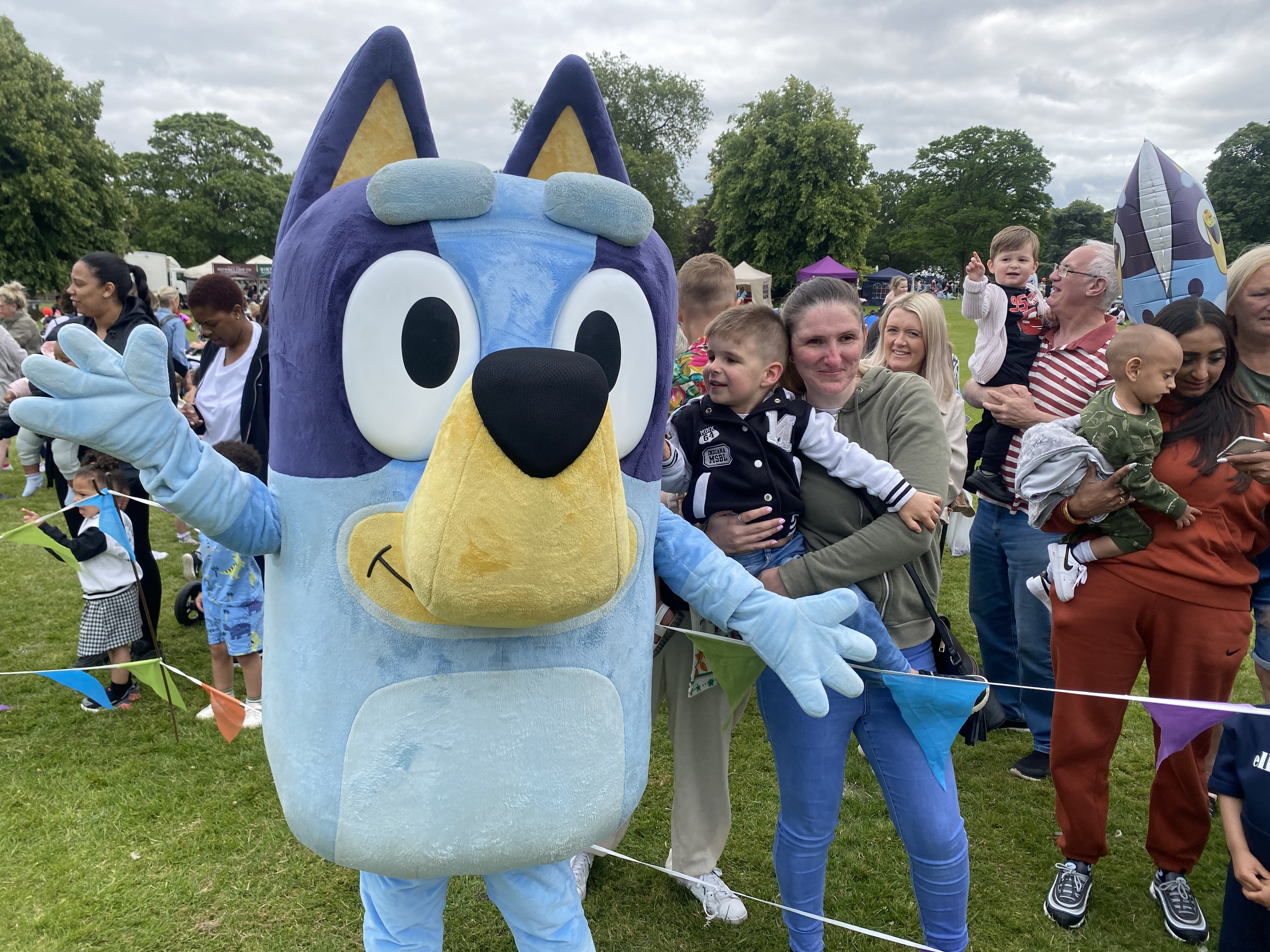
Bluey became one of the most popular cartoons of the 2020s, along with Hazbin Hotel, Harley Quinn, Invincible, Love, Death & Robots, Arcane, The Owl House, Smiling Friends, Kiff, X-Men '97, and the web series The Amazing Digital Circus.

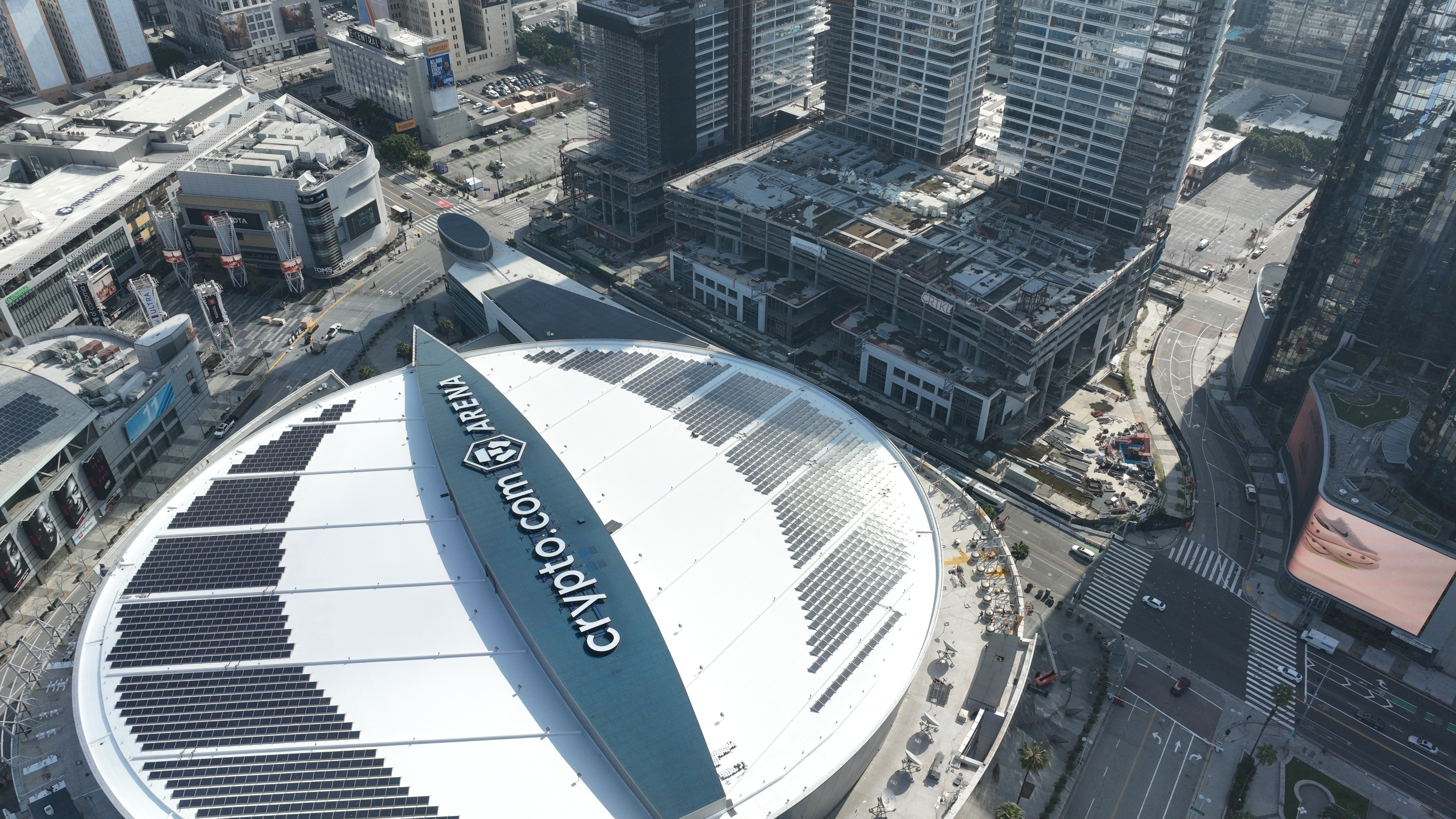
The use of cryptocurrency became more mainstream in the 2020s, Crypto such as Bitcoin and others were notable. The Staples Center was even renamed Crypto.com Arena in 2021. NFTs as a form of digital art emerged in the 2020s, with NFTs such as Everydays: the First 5000 Days.

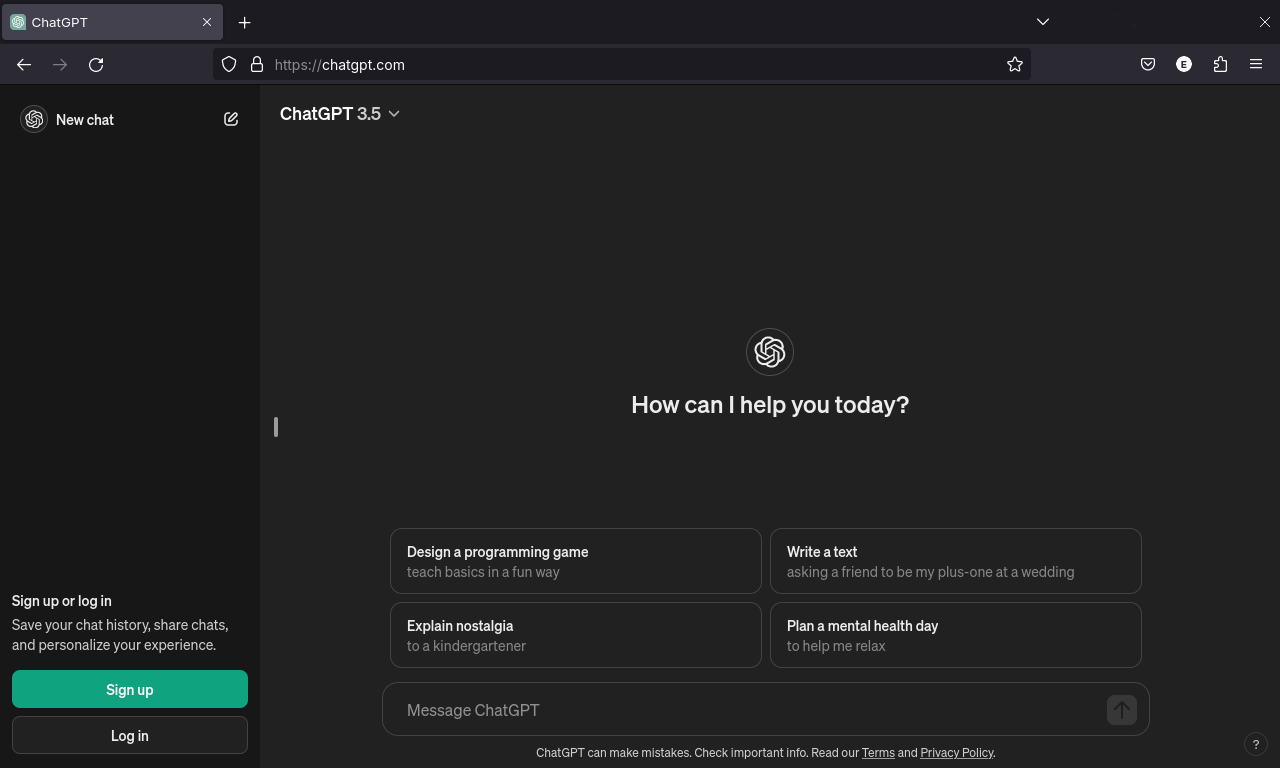
Advancements in AI have been rapid and fast-paced in the 2020s. Generative AIs have become mainstream during the decade, with synthetic media in the form of Text-to-image models, DeepSeek, ChatGPT, and Audio deepfakes. Additionally, AI has been used for video creation, such as with Sora.

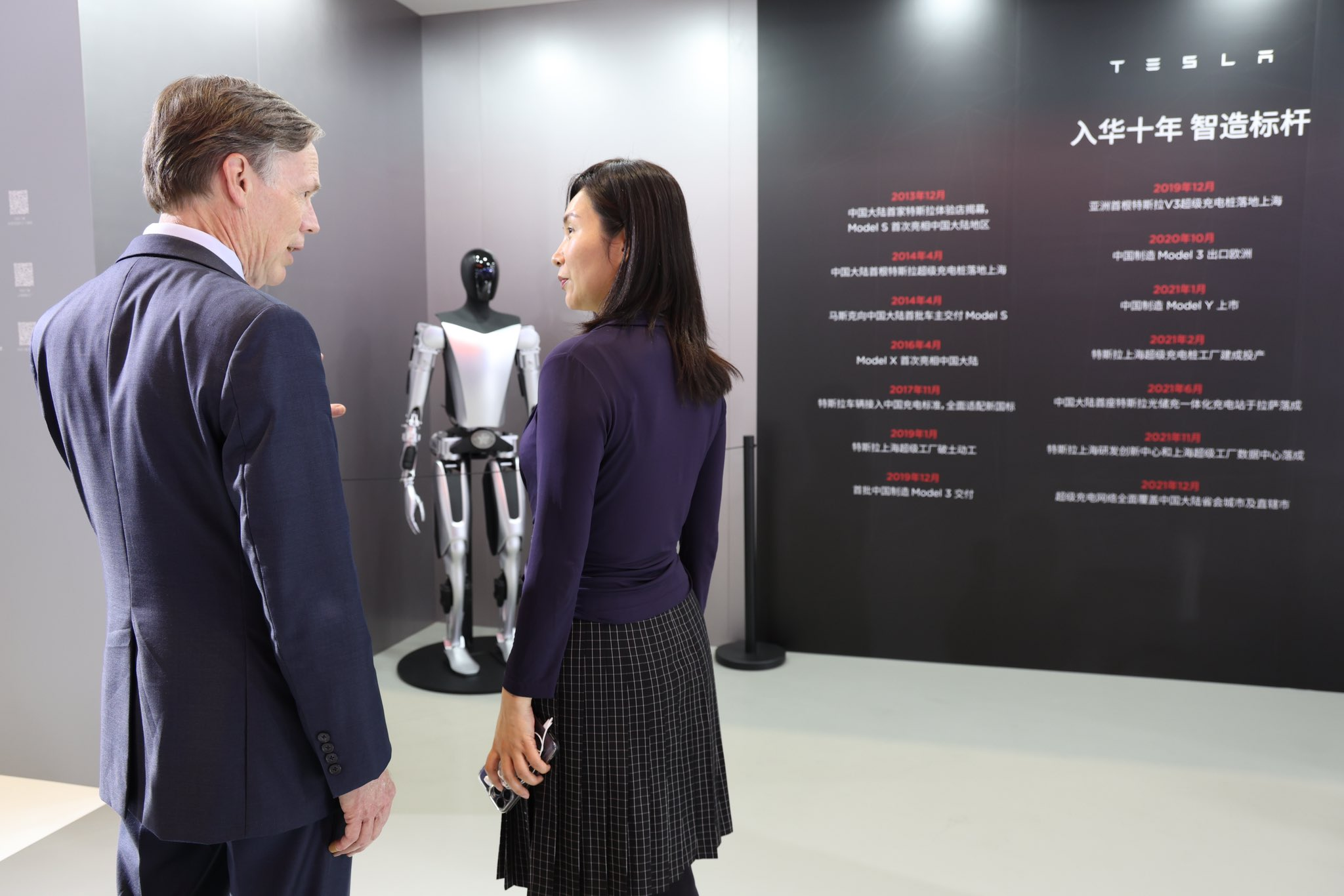
The Fourth Industrial Revolution in the 2020s is referred to as industrial change with emerging technologies such as AI, gene editing, and advanced robotics that blur the lines between the physical, digital, and biological worlds. Automation also continues to take over human jobs. Above is a photo of a Tesla Bot, which Tesla, Inc. hopes to begin selling by 2027.

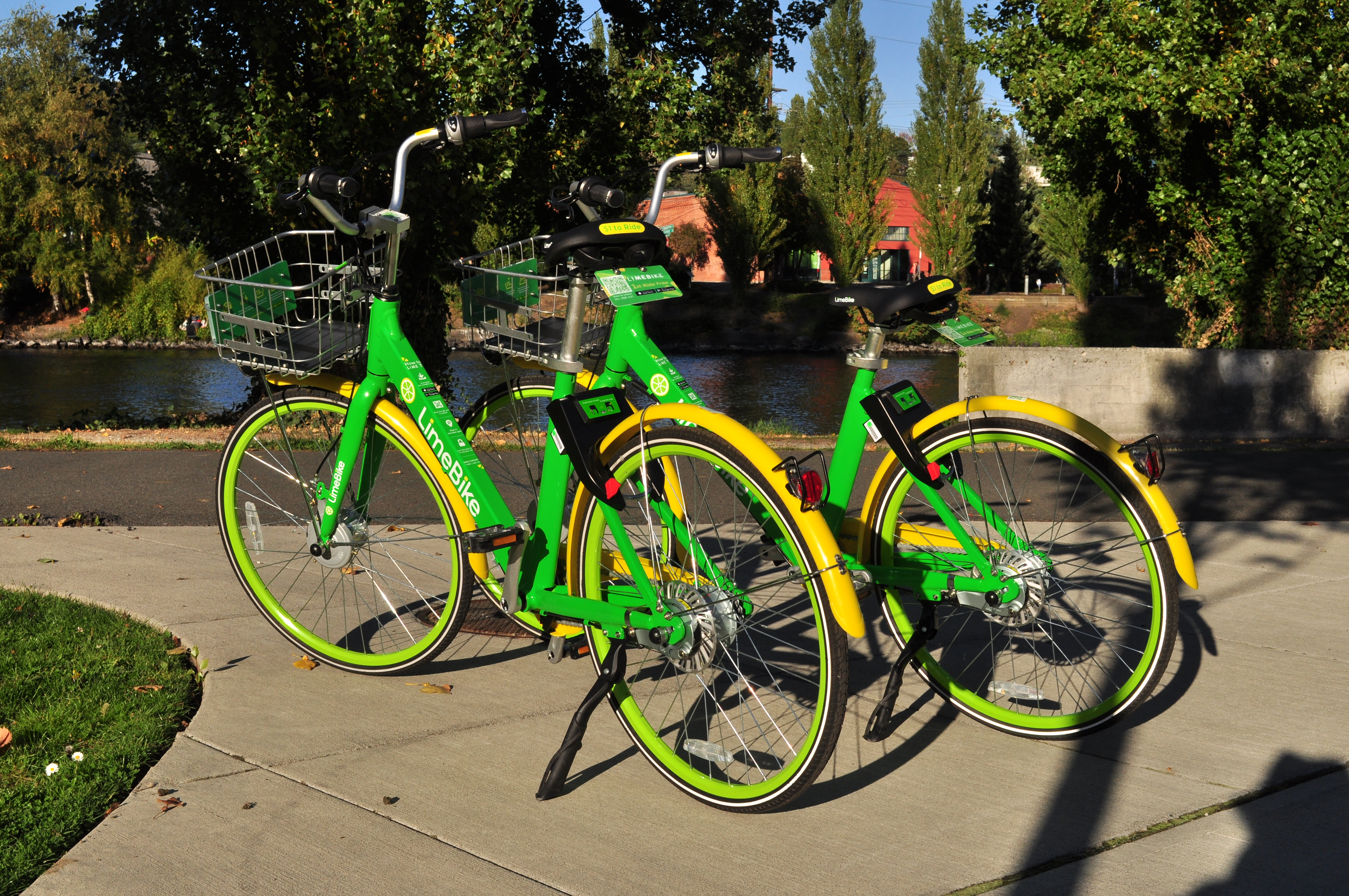
Renewable energy sources such as electric vehicles as well as solar- and wind-powered devices to combat global warming became popular during the 2020s. Scooter-sharing systems have become common in the street scene of the 2020s (especially in downtown areas), with Lime becoming popular.

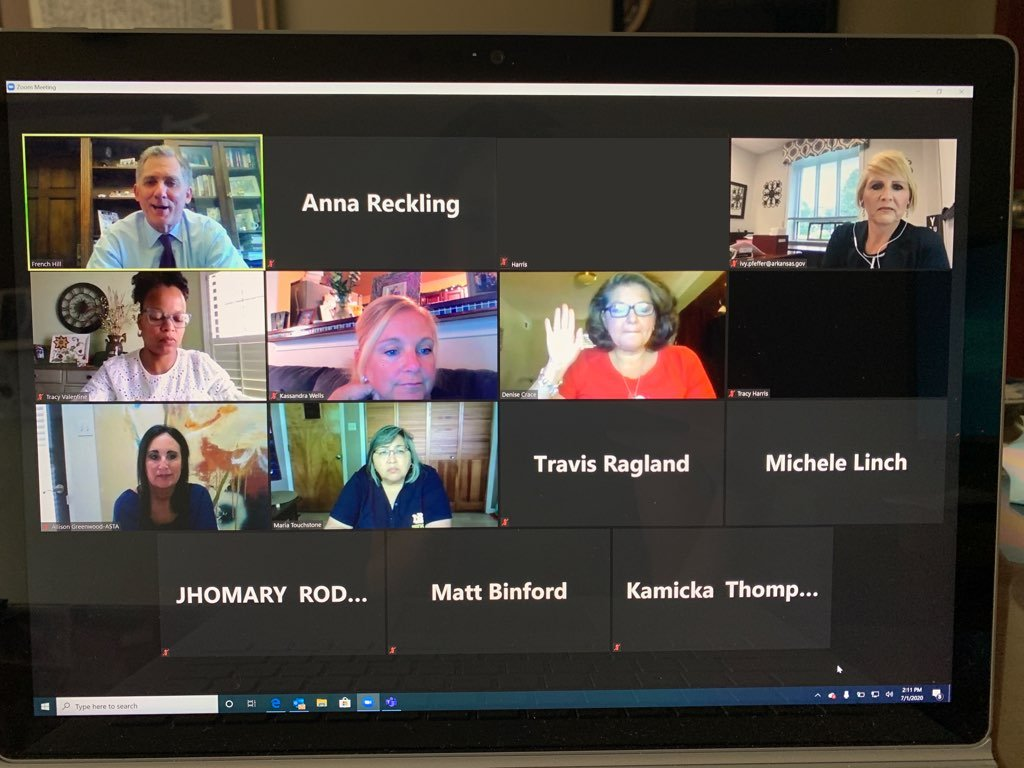
The early 2020s started with a rise in videoconferencing due to the pandemic, while many educational institutions and workplaces shifted to distance learning and remote work during and after the pandemic. Large-scale video conferencing became a reality and more common during the 2020s.

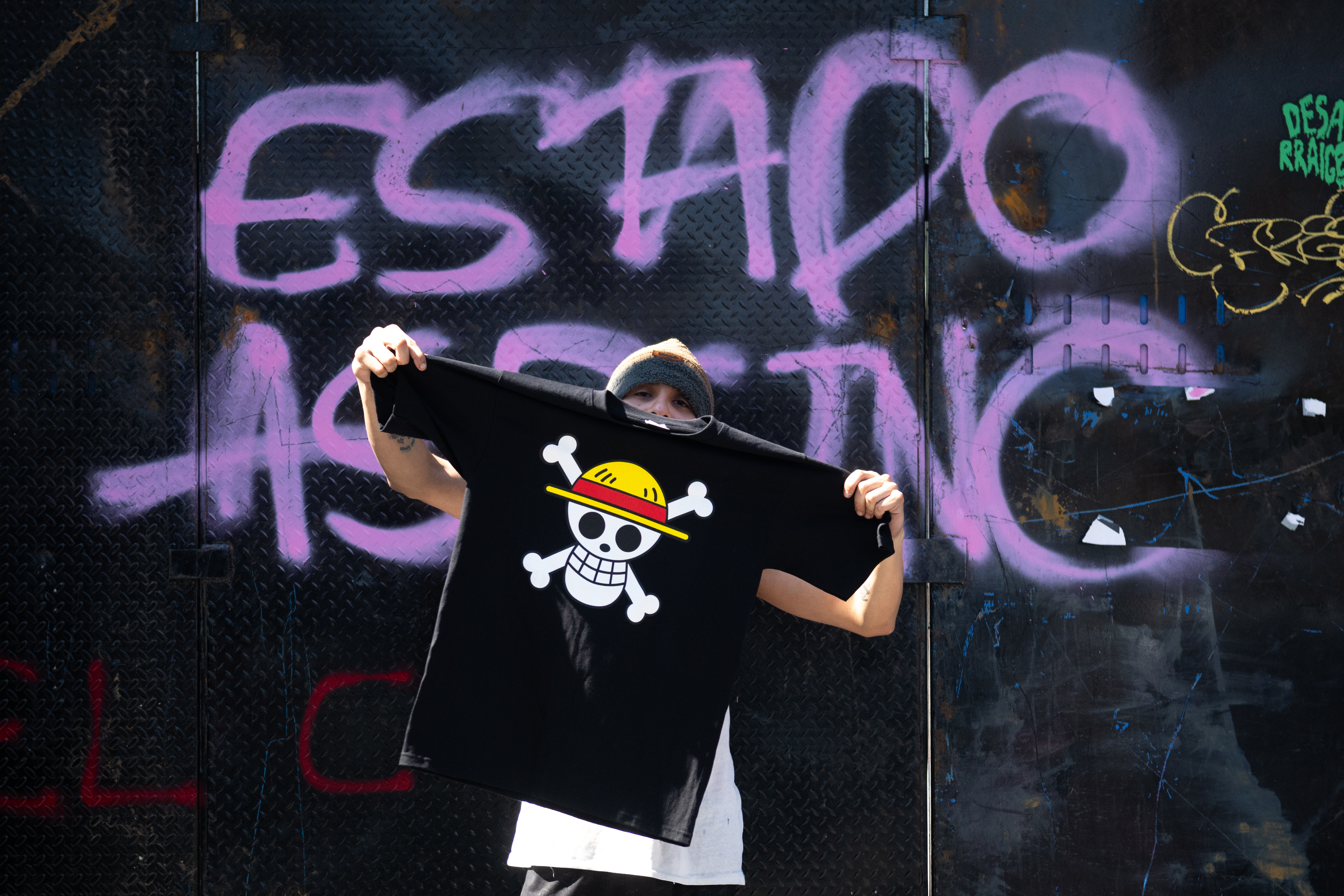
Gen Z society grown in pop culture, such as idolization promotions and community campaigns. The Straw Hat Pirates' Jolly Roger flag from One Piece as the symbol of the chaotic Gen Z protests spread worldwide.

Popular Japanese media franchises such as Demon Slayer: Kimetsu no Yaiba, Chainsaw Man, Jujutsu Kaisen, Oshi no Ko, Frieren, Attack on Titan, Spy × Family, Dr. Stone, One Piece, Umamusume, Blue Lock, and Mashle reaching large international audiences and fans used for crossover works during the Reiwa era.

The 2020s saw the online fandom boom, franchises including Deltarune, KPop Demon Hunters, Genshin Impact, Hazbin Hotel, Hatsune Miku: Colorful Stage!, Umamusume, The Amazing Digital Circus, and Heated Rivalry became highly organized and influential in the Gen Z digital culture.

Independent animation entered the mainstream in the 2020s with shows such as The Amazing Digital Circus, Hazbin Hotel, Helluva Boss, Murder Drones, and Lackadaisy.

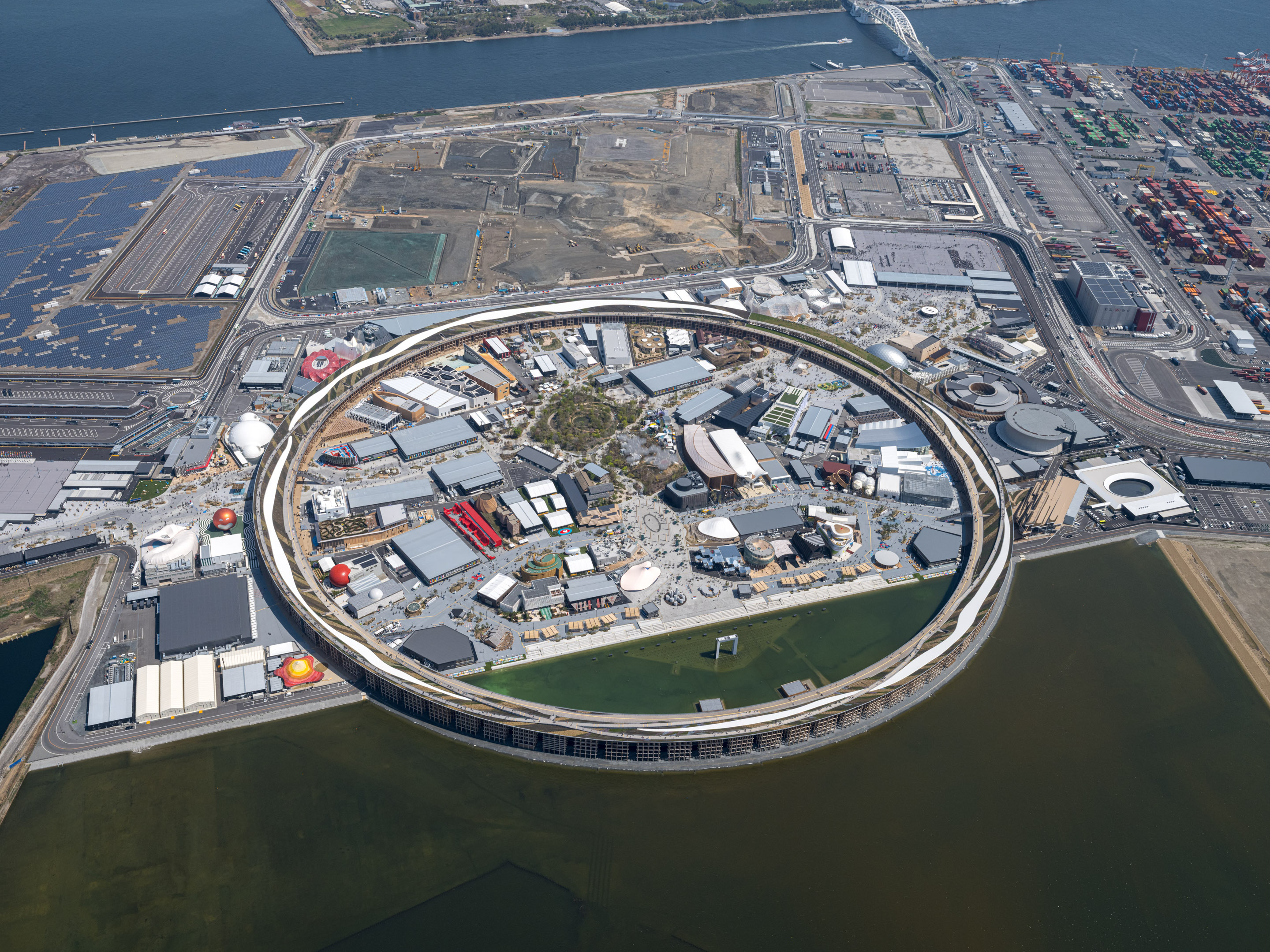
The decade saw the rise of eco-friendly wooden architecture, such as the Grand Ring by Sou Fujimoto as the symbol of the famous Expo 2025 held between April and October 2025 in Osaka.

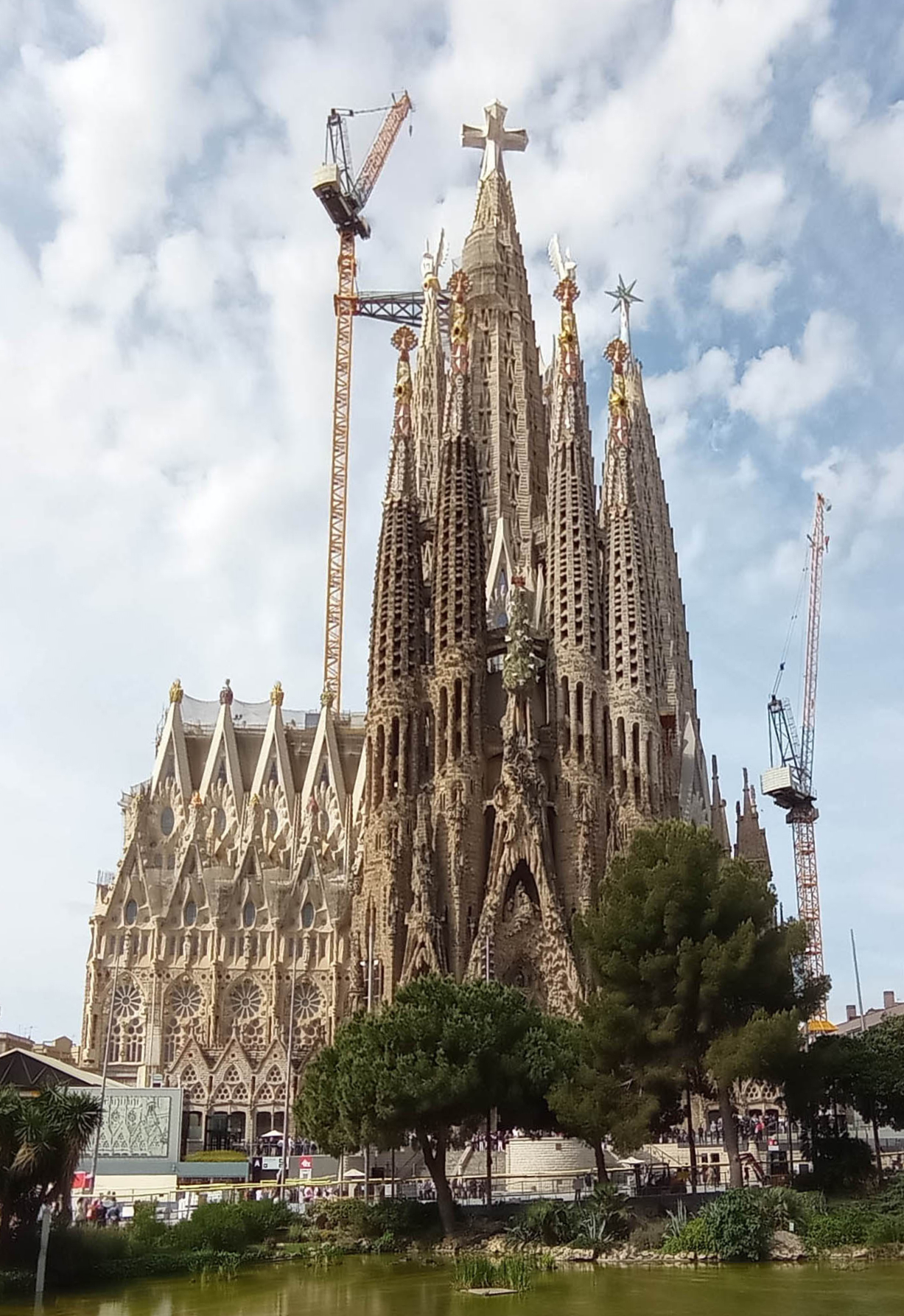
Sagrada Familia in Barcelona became the world's tallest church when a part of its central tower was lifted into place and reached 162.91 m, surpassing Ulm Minster, made by Antonio Gaudi's longtime legacy of the construction progress since 1882.

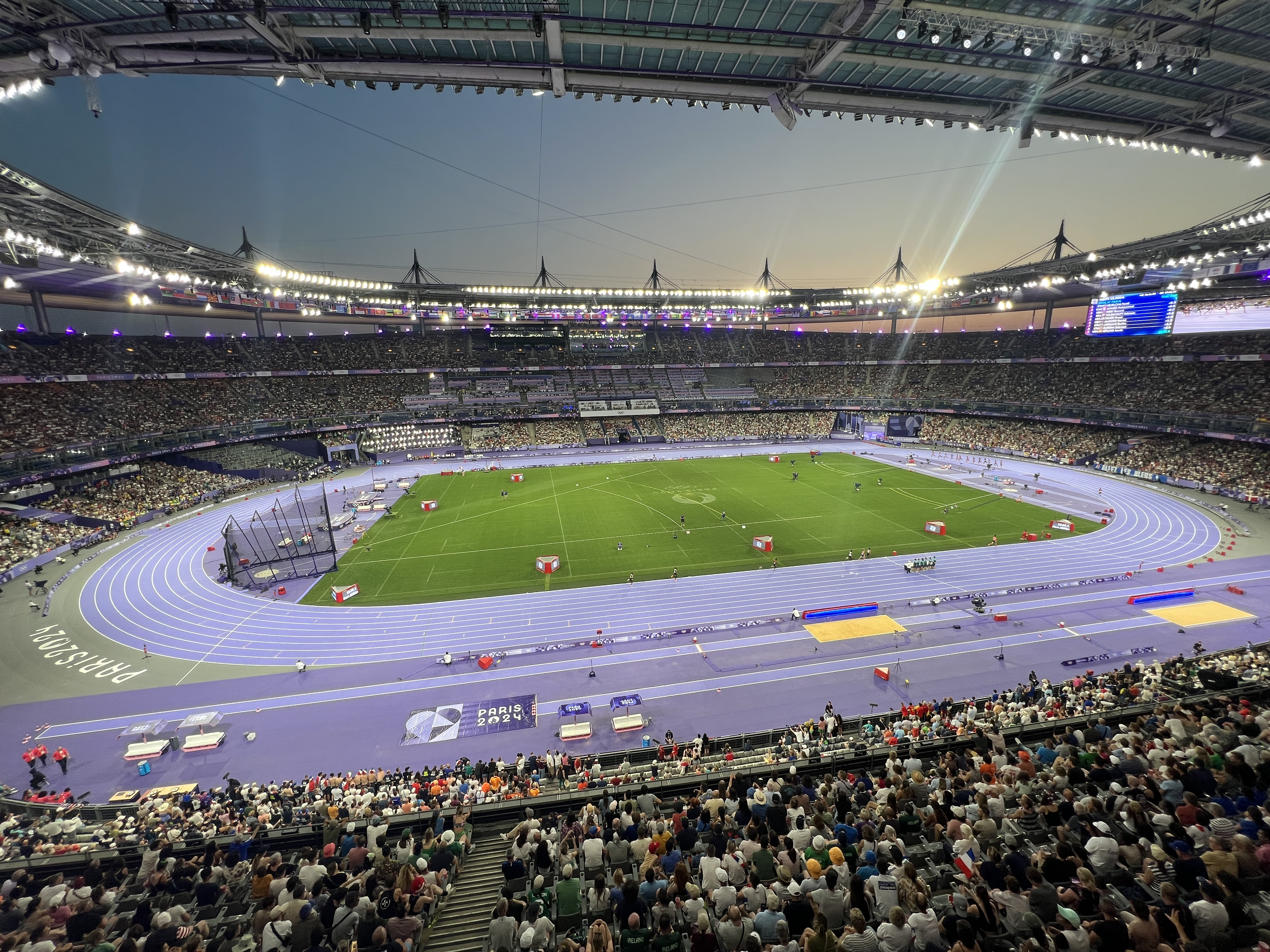
Summer Olympic Games of the 2020s include Paris in 2024 and Los Angeles in 2028, as well as Tokyo 2020 in 2021 (the first ever Olympic games to be delayed, taking place in 2021 instead of 2020); The Winter Olympic Games of the decade included Beijing in 2022 and Milan-Cortina in 2026.

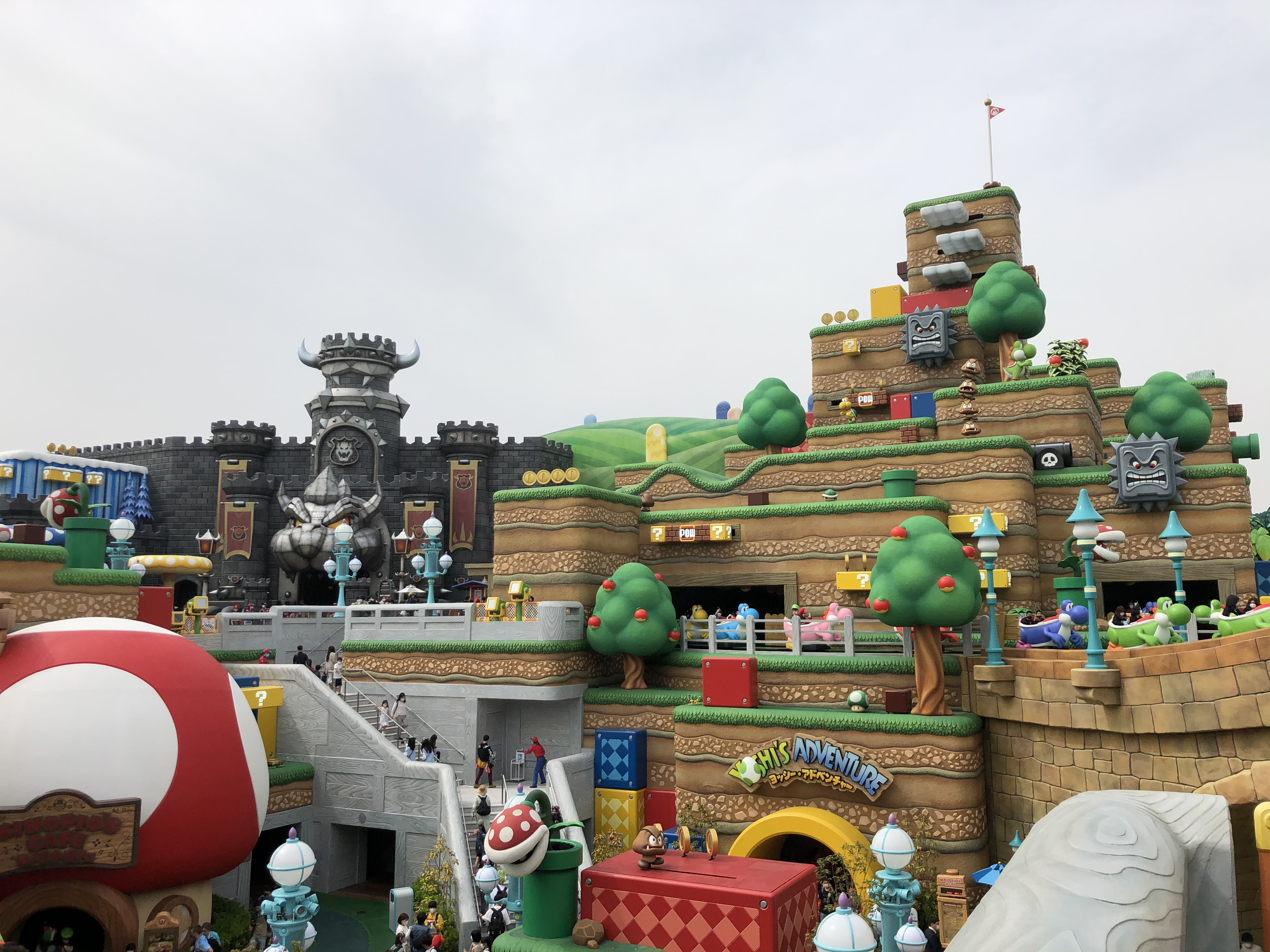
The 2020s was a more profitable era for movies based on video games. The Super Mario Bros. Movie and its sequel surpassed $2 billion, and Nintendo plans to open a group of international theme parks called Super Nintendo World and a Nintendo Museum between 2021 and 2025.

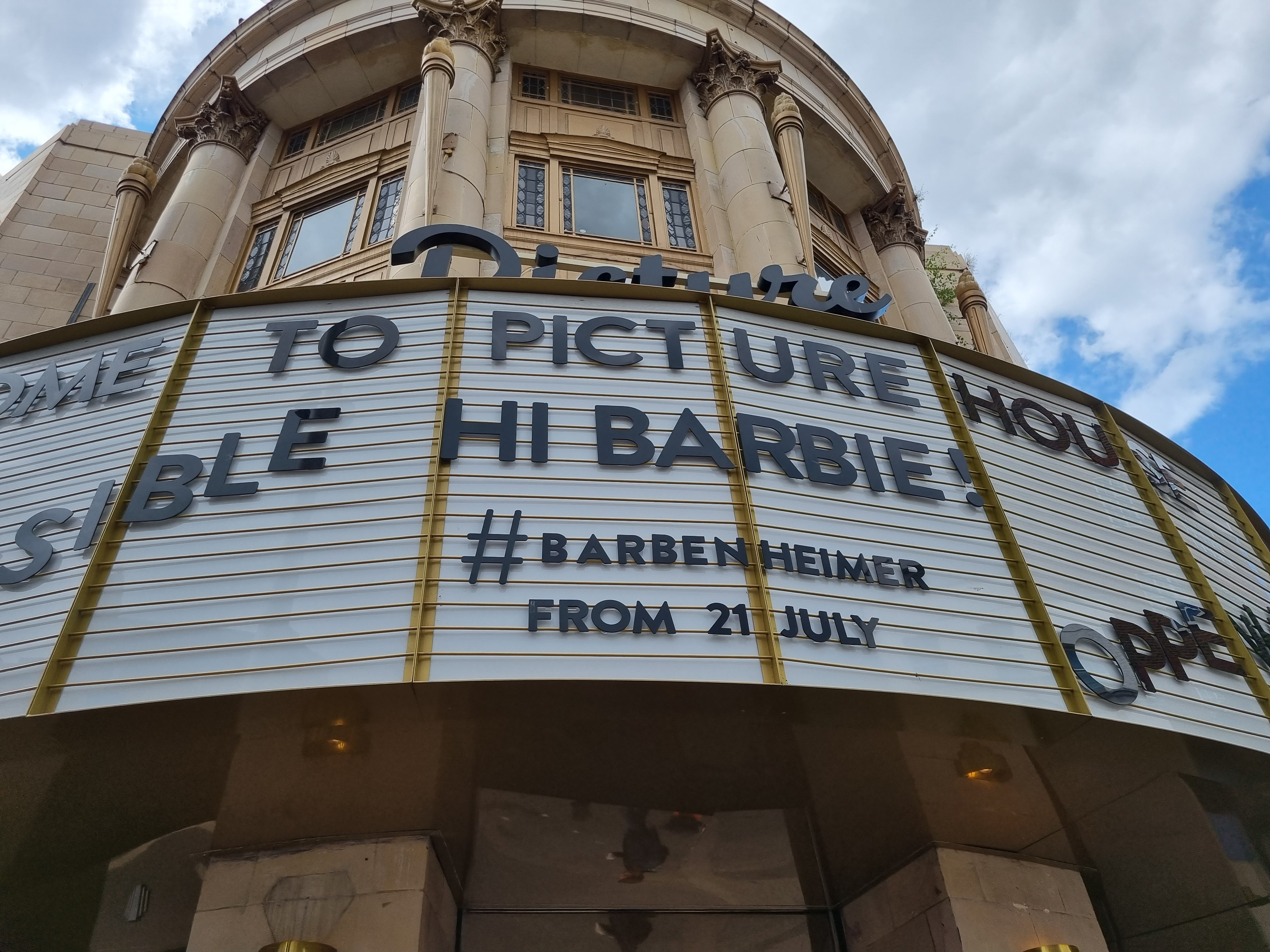
Barbenheimer, consisting of the films Barbie and Oppenheimer, was the double feature phenomenon released on the same day in July 2023, which both films became critically and commercially successful. Other films from the decade included Everything Everywhere All at Once, Wicked, Dune, Top Gun: Maverick, Sinners, Project Hail Mary, M3GAN, Spider-Man: Brand New Day, and The Odyssey

During the 2020s, the idea of brain implants existed in an early, limited form. The company Neuralink and a research group demonstrated the ability for a monkey to move a computer cursor with neural signals, typing coherent sentences.

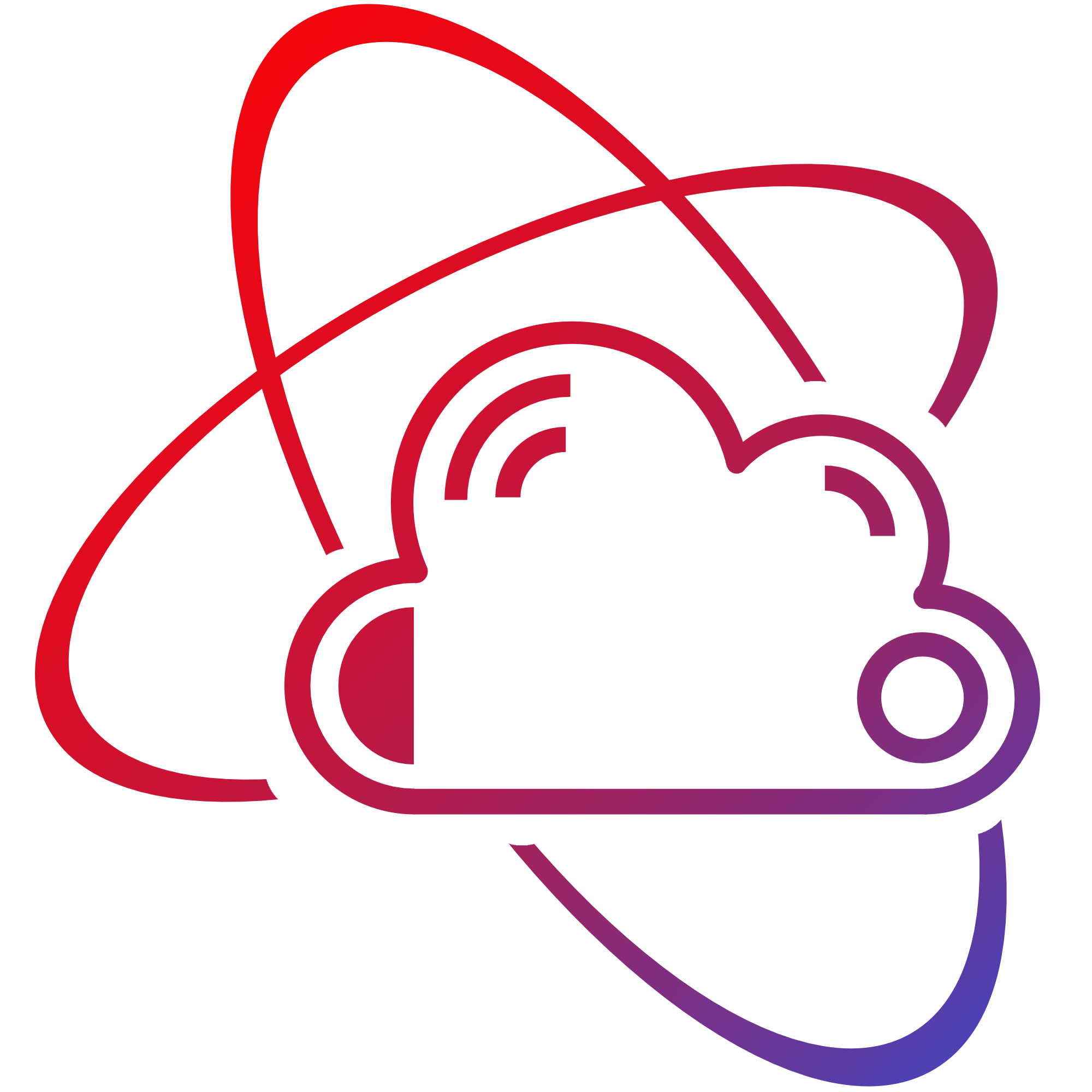
Cloud computing has surged in popularity following and during the global pandemic of 2020. Cloud computing allows for data to be stored in data centres and looked up on any device, rather than the photos, notes, etc. of a device being restricted to just that device.

The Sustainable Development Goals promote seventeen interlinked objectives designed to serve as a "shared blueprint for peace and prosperity for people and the planet, now and into the future". Pictured above is a diagram listing the 17 Sustainable Development Goals, which are intended to be completed by the end of the 2020s.

Social media rebranding occurred during the 2020s, with Facebook, Inc. and Twitter changing their names to Meta Platforms and X (though many people continue to call it Twitter). New social platforms such as Threads and Bluesky also launched.

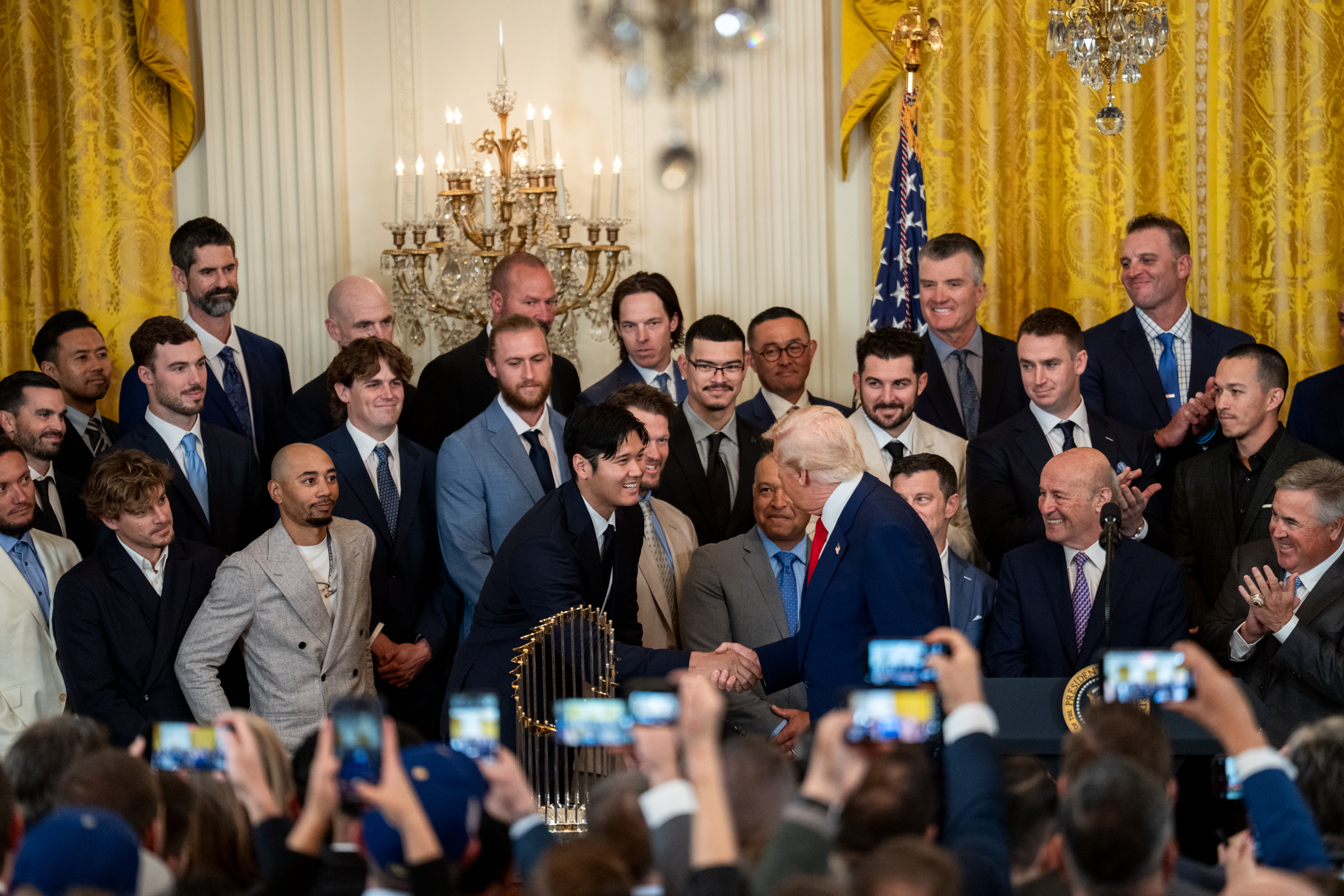
Japanese baseball player Shohei Otani became one of the most popular sports figures during the decade, following the victory of the Los Angeles Dodgers at the 2024 World Series, and again in 2025 followed by Yoshinobu Yamamoto who won the World Series MVP.

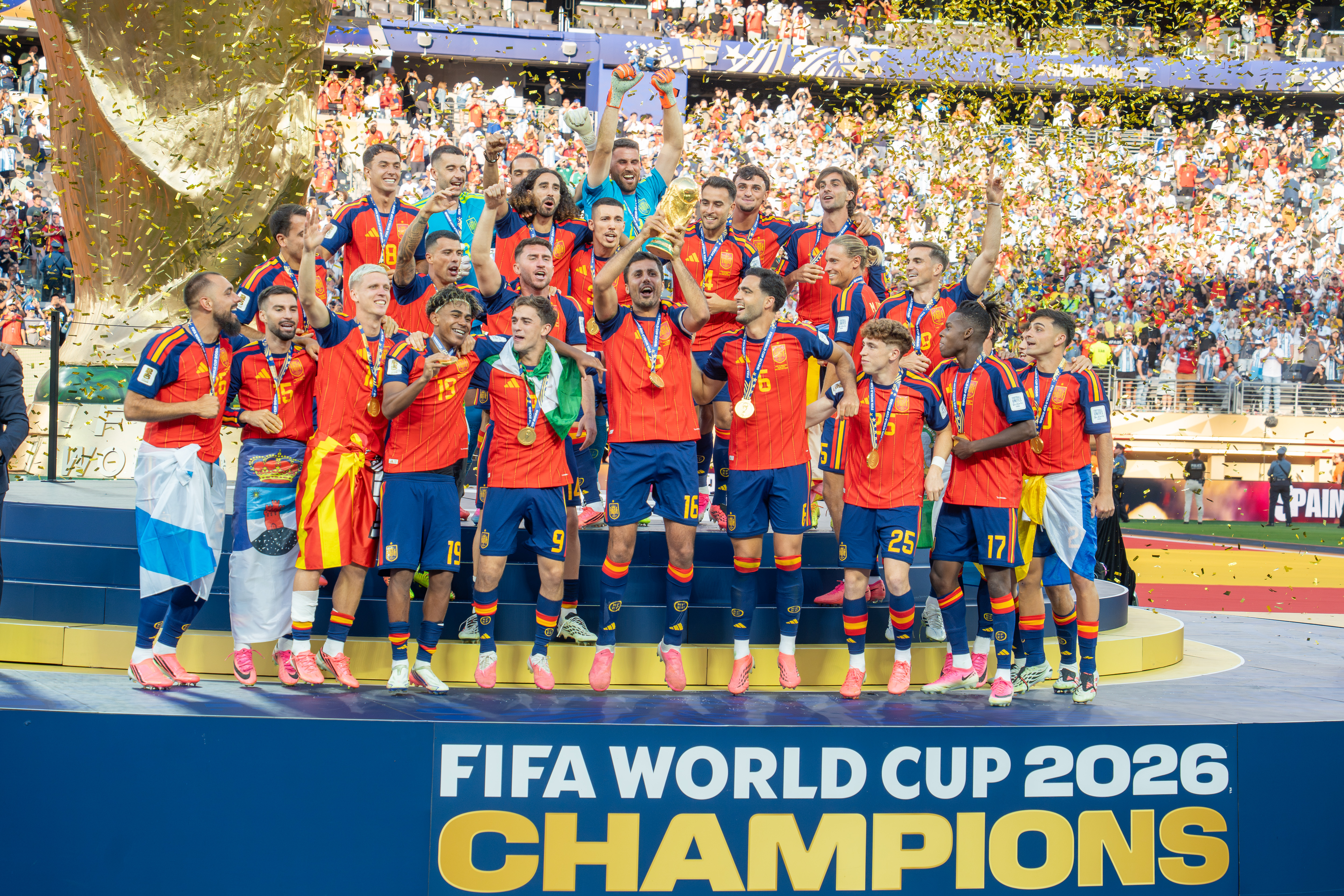
Football domination continued during the decade, including Argentina's win over France at the 2022 FIFA World Cup final. Lamine Yamal, Lionel Messi, and Kylian Mbappé are amongst the most famous footballers of the decade, and Spain defeated Argentina in the 2026, their first FIFA World Cup since 2010.

=== Fashion ===
The fashion of the early 2020s was characterised by a variety of styles and influences from different eras. During this period, the trend towards individuality and self-expression in clothing continued. Young millennials and Generation Z has witnessed and enjoyed a notable resurgence of fashion styles from the 1980s, 1990s, and 2000s in the fashion industry. A prominent example of this is the revival of trends such as crop tops, baggy jeans, and elements from the Y2K aesthetic.

In the 2020s, many companies, including current fast fashion giants such as Shein and Temu, began using social media platforms such as TikTok and Instagram as a marketing tool. Marketing strategies involving third parties, particularly influencers and celebrities, have become prominent tactics. E-commerce platforms that promote small businesses, such as Depop and Etsy, grew by offering vintage, homemade, or resold clothing from individual sellers. Thrifting also exploded in popularity because of the potential to find valuable pieces of clothing at cheaper prices.

=== Film ===
The COVID-19 pandemic heavily impacted film releases especially early in the decade, resulting in a drastic drop in box office revenue as well as many films postponing their release or shifting it to a streaming services. Spider-Man: Brand New Day is the highest-grossing film of the decade so far, and currently the third-highest-grossing film of all time. Other financially successful films at the box office include Top Gun: Maverick, Dune and its sequel Dune: Part Two, and Wicked. Superhero films mostly continued to do well financially, such as most successes from the Marvel Cinematic Universe, continuing with its "Multiverse Saga" (accompanied with a series of shows and specials created exclusively on Disney+ which interconnect with the films). Several successful horror films included M3GAN, Obsession, Sinners and the X trilogy.

In 2023, the films Barbie and Oppenheimer were both released on the same day, which led to the creation of the double feature phenomenon known as "Barbenheimer". Both films became critically and commercially successful with both ranking among the highest-grossing films of 2023 (for which Barbie ranks number 1), and the two respectively receiving a nomination for Best Picture at the 96th Academy Awards, with Oppenheimer winning both the award and nabbing Christopher Nolan's first Best Director award.

2025 became the year of highest-grossing animated films in Asia, such as Ne Zha 2 and Demon Slayer: Kimetsu no Yaiba – The Movie: Infinity Castle, to gross $3 billion in a successful box office of the year, Japanese anime films became dominant for 15 years since Arrietty (2010).

Throughout 2026, the saying "movies are back" has become more often used due to the increase of films reaching simultaneous success critically, commercially and particularly with Gen Z audiences (in comparison to the previous post-pandemic years), their distinct ambitions and milestones, and the amount of different options in genre for moviegoers. Namely Spider-Man: Brand New Day (a crowd-pleasing blockbuster from the widely beloved four-quadrant franchise, and its most successful entry yet) as the highest grossing film of the year, Nolan's The Odyssey which became the highest-grossing R-rated film of all time as well as the second highest-grossing film of 2026 and both Universal's and Nolan's highest-grossing film in addition to being the first feature-length film to be fully shot in 70mm IMAX, aswell as the two horror films reaching (through positive word of mouth and social media support) an unexpected amount of success at the box office against their low production budgets that were Obsession (making over $520 million on its $750,000 budget) and Backrooms (which made over $400 million against a $10 million budget).

=== Television ===
The 2020s started off with streaming services like Netflix, Amazon Prime Video, Apple TV+, Paramount+, HBO Max, Showtime, Crunchyroll, Hayu, Peacock, DAZN, and Disney+. Ad-supported streaming televisions such as Pluto TV and YouTube TV also became more popular.

During a live broadcast of the 94th Academy Awards in 2022, audiences across the auditorium and at home watched in shock as actor and musician Will Smith, who was nominated for, and won, Best Actor that evening for his performance in the biographical film King Richard, slapped comedian and actor Chris Rock, who was presenting Best Documentary Feature, across the face after making a joke about Smith's wife Jada Pinkett Smith. Following that ceremony's incident, after receiving his Oscar, Smith was suspended from the academy for ten years.

Billions of people watched the death and state funeral of Elizabeth II in 2022 and the coronation of Charles III and Camilla in 2023. The 2024 Summer Olympics coverage in Paris speculated to be the most watched special television events in history.

==== Animated ====
Japanese anime continued to rise in global popularity and appeal during the decade, with works such as Jujutsu Kaisen, Demon Slayer: Kimetsu no Yaiba, Spy × Family , Chainsaw Man, Beastars, Cyberpunk: Edgerunners, Hell's Paradise: Jigokuraku, Oshi no Ko, Baki, Delicious in Dungeon, Record of Ragnarok, Frieren, Dandadan, Solo Leveling, Scott Pilgrim Takes Off, Tokyo Revengers, Vinland Saga, Witch Watch, Kaiju No. 8, Gachiakuta, Bleach: Thousand-Year Blood War, Sakamoto Days, Attack on Titan, Jojo's Bizarre Adventure and One Piece reaching large international audiences.

New and critically acclaimed teen and adult animated shows like Harley Quinn, Hazbin Hotel, Primal, Love, Death & Robots, Blood of Zeus, Invincible, Arcane, Devil May Cry, and Smiling Friends, as well as the web series The Amazing Digital Circus and Murder Drones, were launched in the 2020s, along with other animated shows such as Bluey, Jentry Chau vs. The Underworld, Batman: Caped Crusader, The Owl House, X-Men '97, Adventure Time: Fionna and Cake, My Adventures with Superman, and Star Wars: Visions.

==== Live-action ====
A variety of shows on streaming services such as Squid Game, Severance, Never Have I Ever, Tulsa King, Ted Lasso, Beef, The Boys, Extraordinary Attorney Woo, Only Murders in the Building, Wednesday, The Sex Lives of College Girls, Euphoria, Abbott Elementary, The Bear, Heartstopper, Love, Victor, The Pitt, Shōgun, The Witcher, The White Lotus, Alice in Borderland, Hacks, The Diplomat, Yellowstone, The Last of Us, Succession, Heated Rivalry and Tiger King gained popularity. Many different shows on many different competing streaming services resulted in what has been called the "streaming wars" of the early 2020s. Miniseries also gained popularity such as The Queen's Gambit, Dahmer – Monster: The Jeffrey Dahmer Story, Daisy Jones & the Six, Beef, Mr Bates vs The Post Office, Mrs. America, Mare of Easttown, and Pam & Tommy.

Also released in the 2020s, the reality game show The Traitors achieved popularity and became a global success.

Several TV shows based on films include American Gigolo, The Penguin, live-action Star Wars series (such as The Mandalorian, Ahsoka, and Andor), Peacemaker, Mr. & Mrs. Smith, and Ted.

=== Music ===
By 2020, TikTok, an online video service, had become extremely popular as a music platform on social media. Users on streaming platforms such as Spotify, YouTube Music, Deezer, Amazon Music, and Apple Music have increased due to the COVID-19 pandemic. Festivals such as Coachella were cancelled because of the virus. The COVID-19 pandemic devastated the touring business.

The 2020s saw the continued impact of streaming on the record industry, a trend that began in the 2010s. Platforms like Spotify played a central role in shaping music trends, driving the success of both mainstream and emerging genres. Social media, particularly TikTok, further amplified music with viral trends, while popular genres like pop, hip-hop, R&B, rock music including pop punk and shoegaze, country, K-pop and indie music dominated the Billboard Hot 100 charts. At the same time, underground genres like hyperpop, plugg, jersey club, phonk and rage thrived in niche communities.

Pop, hip-hop, rock music including pop punk and shoegaze, Eurodance, indie, K-pop, R&B, trance, and synth-pop all dominated the early part of the decade, with the most popular artists being Ariana Grande, Lizzo, Drake, Kendrick Lamar, Nicki Minaj, Dua Lipa, Ice Spice, Charli XCX, the Weeknd, Justin Bieber, Taylor Swift, Chappell Roan, Doja Cat, Olivia Rodrigo, Billie Eilish, Playboi Carti, Morgan Wallen, Beyoncé, Sabrina Carpenter, Jelly Roll, and more. The early 20s also saw the one-off return of the Beatles and the Rolling Stones with a new song and album, respectively, which topped out the charts immediately upon release. 2022 saw a revival in Kate Bush's song "Running Up That Hill", due to its appearance in the Netflix series Stranger Things. Starting around 2023, country music has seen a rise in popularity with artists such as Luke Combs and Morgan Wallen topping the charts along with artists such as Beyoncé and Post Malone releasing country albums.

=== Video games ===
The ninth generation of consoles began in 2020. The industry remains dominated by Nintendo, Sony, and Microsoft with the release of the Xbox Series X/S and the PlayStation 5, while the Nintendo Switch continues to be popular from the previous decade. Technological advancements in consoles included support for real-time ray tracing graphics and output for 4K or even 8K resolution. Physical media continued to be replaced by online distribution of games, with the Xbox Series S and the PlayStation 5 Digital Edition lacking an optical drive. The Steam Deck was released in 2022 as Valve's attempt to bring PC-level gaming to a Nintendo Switch-style handheld format.

During the decade PC gaming would continue growing rapidly with the console gaming market remaining more stagnant. The growing majority of video game developers would also primarily focus on developing their projects for PC. Mobile gaming remained the largest sector of the video game industry during the decade, accounting for roughly half of the industry's revenue.

Critically successful games such as Elden Ring, Ghost of Tsushima, God of War Ragnarök, Baldur's Gate 3, Black Myth: Wukong, Astro Bot, Clair Obscur: Expedition 33, Cyberpunk 2077, and The Last of Us Part II were released and won multiple best game of the year awards, signalling a shift towards narrative-driven and single-played focused gaming compared with the end of the 2010s where popularity of multiplayer gaming dominated. Nonetheless, widely successful multiplayer games includes Among Us, EA Sports FC, Call of Duty: Warzone, Fall Guys, Fate/Grand Order, Fortnite, Genshin Impact, Honkai: Star Rail, It Takes Two, Counter-Strike 2, Umamusume: Pretty Derby, Minecraft, Terraria, Roblox, Tetris Effect, Dead by Daylight, Overwatch 2, League of Legends, and Valorant surged in popularity in the decade and became a global sensation since the COVID-19 pandemic.

=== Architecture ===
There is a revival in expressionist architecture. The SoFi Stadium and Intuit Dome were completed in September 2020 and August 2024, there are a component of Hollywood Park, a master-planned neighbourhood in development in Inglewood, California. The venue serves as a home to the Los Angeles Clippers, the Rams, and the Chargers. Both they hosted the Super Bowl LVI in February 2022, the 2026 NBA All-Star Game in February 2026, and the 2026 FIFA World Cup in June 2026. The stadium and arena is also set to host the opening and closing ceremonies, aquatic events (swimming and diving), and basketball events for the 2028 Summer Olympics, which will be hosted in Los Angeles, California, United States.

The Unity Tower in Kraków was finally completed on 30 September 2020. The construction of the building originally started in 1975 but stopped permanently in 1981 because of economic constraints and political unrest at the time. Due to the unfinished building's resemblance to a skeleton, it was nicknamed after Skeletor, the arch-villain in He-Man and the Masters of the Universe, which was popular in Poland at the time construction began.

Several developments in Saudi Arabia to achieve the Saudi Vision 2030, such as the 2034 FIFA World Cup stadiums, Qiddiya City, Neom's The Line, Jeddah Tower, Roshn, and Riyadh's Expo 2030 site. The Jeddah Tower would become the world's tallest building or structure, after a long-delayed construction progress and resumed in 2025, standing at least 180 metres (590 ft) taller than the Burj Khalifa.

The Grand Ring was built and designed by the Japanese firms Tohata Architects and Azusa Sekkei, the building became the symbol of the famous Expo 2025 in Osaka, Japan. It was recognised by the Guinness World Records as the world's largest architectural structure (certified area: 61,035.55 m^{2}).

Between October 2025 and February 2026, the Sagrada Família became the world's tallest church when a part of its central tower was lifted into place and reached 162.91 m, surpassing Ulm Minster (161.53 m), and the basilica reached its final height of 172.5 metres (566 ft). The basilica also became the longest period of construction history since 1882, and reached its maximum height though the magnum opus of Catalan architect Antoni Gaudí's legacy remains years away from completion.

=== Sports ===
Since the COVID-19 pandemic impacted major sporting events led to the postponement and cancellations in the early-2020s, technological advances growing popularity throughout the decade like digital live broadcasts from the successful 2024 Summer Olympics in Paris. Football, horse racing, basketball, athletics, tennis, volleyball, baseball, cricket and chess became more popular for digital audiences during the decade.

The COVID-19 pandemic led to the cancellation or rescheduling of numerous sporting events globally. The 2020 Summer Olympics and Paralympics in Tokyo were postponed to July–August 2021. This was the first Olympic Games to be postponed rather than cancelled in history since World War II.

Zimbabwean sports administrator and politician Kirsty Coventry became the first woman, the first multicultural, and the first African President of the International Olympic Committee, following the resignation of Thomas Bach. She is also the second youngest person and second Olympic medallist to be elected to the position since Pierre de Coubertin and Thomas Bach, her achievements are focused on feminism and gender equality in sports.

The International Olympic Committee has begun a new policy of authorising up to 5 additional sports per edition of the Olympic Games, and this rule applies to both the Summer and Winter Games. This rule came into effect starting with the 2020 Summer Olympics.

==== Football ====
Football's popularity has continued global dominance, while also undergoing significant shifts due to various factors, Argentina and Spain won the 2022 FIFA World Cup and the 2023 FIFA Women's World Cup by defeating France and England, with Lionel Messi and Aitana Bonmatí winning the Golden Balls, while Hinata Miyazawa and Kylian Mbappé winning the Golden Boots.

The 2026 FIFA World Cup was the first since 2002 to be hosted by multiple nations. Mexico became the first country to host the World Cup three times, having hosted the 1970 and 1986 tournaments. The United States previously hosted the World Cup in 1994, while it was Canada's first time hosting the tournament. Spain won the finals over Argentina and returned to football domination of victories at the UEFA Euro 2024 and the Paris 2024 Olympic football matches, it was their second FIFA World Cup title and first World Cup victory since 2010. Spain became the first country to simultaneously hold the men's and women's World Cup, having won the latter in 2023.

==== Baseball ====
Baseball had a notable resurgence, particularly within its traditional strongholds, Japan and the United States. Japan defeated the United States in the 2023 World Baseball Classic with a score of 3–2, winning their 3rd title in the event. Japanese baseball player Shohei Ohtani was named the MVP of the tournament. He became the first player in MLB history to record 50 home runs and 50 stolen bases in a season and was unanimously named the 2024 National League MVP. rivalling Aaron Judge of the New York Yankees, Ohtani led the Los Angeles Dodgers to victory in the 2024 World Series, and again in 2025 over Toronto Blue Jays.

Venezuela had landslide victories over Japan and Italy in the quarterfinal and semi-final and won this year's World Baseball Classic tournament, beating the United States 3–2 in the 2026 World Baseball Classic championship, with Eugenio Suarez hitting a go-ahead double in the top of the 9th to clinch their first title. It was the first major international sporting competition won by Venezuela since the 1945 Amateur World Series, and the second time in Latin America since 2013. Maikel García of Venezuela was named the MVP of the tournament.

The tournament has hit new high levels in attendance and US Television viewership: the 2023 attendance record was broken before the pool play was ended, and US viewership of the final hit 10 million viewers for the first time ever.

Shohei Otani and Mookie Betts met with US president Donald Trump at the White House in April 2025.

==== Basketball ====
Shortly into the decade, on 26 January 2020, 5-time NBA champion, 2008 NBA MVP, two-time Olympic gold medallist and Los Angeles Lakers great Kobe Bryant, and his 13-year-old daughter Gianna, died in a California helicopter crash along with seven other people. A number of tributes and memorials subsequently followed, and the All-Star Game MVP Award was renamed in Bryant's honour.

Basketball has been characterised by significant global growth and dominance in strong youth engagement, the 2023 FIBA World Cup followed by Germany won by defeating Serbia.

On 7 February, 2023, LeBron James, playing for the Los Angeles Lakers, scored his 38,388th career point in a game against the Oklahoma City Thunder, surpassing Kareem Abdul-Jabbar to become the all-time leading scorer in NBA history.

On the night of 1–2 February 2025, Luka Dončić was traded from the Dallas Mavericks to the Los Angeles Lakers for Anthony Davis in a three-team deal facilitated by the Utah Jazz.

=== Food ===
Food delivery apps such as Deliveroo, DoorDash, Instacart, Menulog, Uber Eats, Grubhub, Bolt Food, Wolt, and Just Eat Takeaway became more popular since to the COVID-19 pandemic. Indoor dining was also closed in many countries due to the COVID-19 pandemic, and upon re-opening the usage of QR codes and other technologies in the restaurant industry increased compared to the 2010s to comply with pandemic restrictions.

Due to the COVID-19 restrictions, online grocery shopping has substantially grown and in the first few months of the pandemic, online grocery shopping increased by 300%. Before the pandemic occurred, food shopping activity accounted for 9% of the market, now 63% of consumers worldwide have purchased more groceries online after the outbreak than they did before they were socially isolated.

Some foods grew extremely popular in the 2020s. Dubai chocolate was made in 2021 and grew in popularity in 2024 after being featured in TikTok ASMR videos snapping open with a loud crunch. Matcha grew extremely popular in the early and mid 2020s. Matcha grew in popularity because it was associated with calming effects and clean caffeine. Matcha was loved by younger consumers because of its bright green color and being promoted by influencers on social media, causing it to be on the selection on most coffee menus.

=== Literature ===
Books published throughout the decade include The Vanishing Half, Leave the World Behind, Transcendent Kingdom, Memorial and The City We Became. Recent releases on this decade include How to Prevent the Next Pandemic by Bill Gates, Meet Me by the Fountain: An Inside History of the Mall by Alexandra Lange, Wikipedia @ 20 by Joseph M. Reagle Jr. and Jackie Koerner, and The Candy House.

=== Design ===
The rising popularity of Frutiger Aero and the Y2K aesthetic has led many companies to redesign their products and user interfaces to match these styles, signaling an end to the flat design and Corporate Memphis trends of the 2010s. Many people have also started referring to this new aesthetic as "glassmorphism".

== See also ==
- List of decades
- 2020s in political history

=== Timeline ===
The following articles contain timelines which list the most prominent events of the decade: 2020 . 2021 . 2022 . 2023 . 2024. 2025 . 2026 . 2027 . 2028 . 2029
