= Trial of Tetsuya Yamagami =

Criminal trial of Shinzo Abe's assassin

Trial of Tetsuya Yamagami (first instance)
- Court: Nara District Court
- Full case name: Reiwa 5 (wa) No.7 令和5年（わ）第7号 (Note: In Japan's court case registry, the code shown in parentheses indicates the type of case. The hiragana "わ" (wa) signifies a general criminal trial heard in a district court.)
- Started: 28 October 2025
- Decided: 21 January 2026
- Verdict: Yamagami sentenced to life imprisonment
- Defendant: Tetsuya Yamagami
- Charge: Murder; violations of the Firearm and Sword Possession Control Law; Weapon Manufacturing Law; Gunpowder Control Law; property damage

Court membership
- Chief judge: Shinichi Tanaka
- Lay judges: 6

The trial of Tetsuya Yamagami is part of the aftermath of the assassination of Shinzo Abe, the former prime minister of Japan, on 8 July 2022. Tetsuya Yamagami, the sole suspect in the killing, was arrested at the scene after he shot Shinzo Abe with a homemade firearm. Abe was later pronounced dead that day, and Yamagami was charged with murder, violations of the Firearm and Sword Possession Control Law, Weapon Manufacturing Law, Gunpowder Control Law and property damage. His criminal trial began on 28 October 2025 at the Nara District Court.

During the first hearing, Yamagami acknowledged the charges outlined in the indictments. (Note: In Japanese criminal procedure, a defendant's statement that they "acknowledge" or "do not dispute" the charges does not constitute a formal legal plea. Japanese courts do not use a plea system equivalent to "guilty" or "not guilty" in common law jurisdictions. Instead, the court examines the evidence and determines the facts regardless of the defendant's admission. A defendant may acknowledge the allegations as presented, but the court is still required to establish guilt and assess sentencing through its own fact-finding process.) His defense has focused on presenting mitigating factors across all counts. His surviving relatives were called to testify about the family's long-standing mental and financial difficulties, attributing them to his mother's extensive donations to the Unification Church (UC), which had impoverished the household and resulted in neglect of her children. The defense also argued that the homemade firearms constructed by Yamagami did not fall under the legal definition of a firearm as stipulated in the Firearm and Sword Possession Control Law. They demanded a fixed 20-year imprisonment.

Prosecutors maintained that Yamagami's personal background should not influence the verdict. They presented evidence that he had put substantial effort into constructing and testing his weapons, arguing this demonstrated clear premeditation. They also emphasized the danger posed to the public by carrying out the shooting in daylight in a crowded area. Noting that the killing of a former prime minister had no precedent in postwar Japan, prosecutors characterized the case as exceptionally serious and socially consequential. They sought a sentence of life imprisonment for the defendant. Yamagami was sentenced to life in prison on 21 January 2026. Yamagami's defense filed an appeal with the high court on 4 February 2026.

== Timeline ==
- 8 July 2022 – Tetsuya Yamagami used a homemade firearm to shoot Shinzo Abe while Abe was delivering a campaign speech near the north exit of Yamato-Saidaiji Station in Nara, Japan. Yamagami was immediately restrained by security personnel and arrested. He was first held at the Nara Nishi Police Station, then later transferred to the Osaka Detention House.
  - Initially charged with attempted murder, the charge was upgraded to murder after Abe was pronounced dead later the same day.
- 24 December 2022 – a psychiatric evaluation of Yamagami was completed, determining that he was competent to stand trial.
- 10 January 2023 – Yamagami was transferred back to the Nara Nishi Police Station. Prosecutors added a charge of violating the Firearm and Sword Possession Control Law.
- 30 March 2023 – two additional charges were filed: violations of the Weapon Manufacturing Law and property damage.
- 28 October 2025 – the first-instance trial began at the Nara District Court.

== Background ==
On 8 July 2022, former prime minister Shinzo Abe was assassinated while delivering a campaign speech in Nara. He was shot at close range with a homemade firearm constructed by Tetsuya Yamagami, who was immediately detained at the scene. Abe's death marked the first killing of a current or former Japanese prime minister in the postwar era. Following his arrest, Yamagami reportedly told investigators that his motive stemmed from resentment toward the Unification Church (UC), claiming that his family had been financially ruined by his mother's large donations to the organization. According to police statements and media reports, Yamagami believed Abe's public appearances at events linked to the UC signaled support for the group, which he held responsible for his family's hardships.

== First-instance trial ==
=== First-day hearing ===
Officially, the first-instance trial is registered as "Reiwa 5 (wa) No.7" (令和5年（わ）第7号), held under Japan's lay judge system, and the presiding judge was Shinichi Tanaka (田中 伸一). The trial admitted civilian spectators through a lottery system, with the first-day hearing on 28 October 2025 drawing 727 applicants for 32 available seats. Yamagami, 45, did not dispute the charges listed in the indictments, then stated that he was entrusting the legal arguments to his lawyers.

The prosecution outlined Yamagami's stated motives: Yamagami's mother made excessive donations to the Unification Church (UC), which led to the family's financial collapse. After his eldest brother died by suicide in 2015, Yamagami's resentment toward the UC intensified. He planned to attack leading figures of the UC and began constructing homemade firearms. Due to the COVID-19 lockdowns, he abandoned this initial plan. After watching Shinzo Abe's video message for a UC-related organization, he came to believe that targeting Abe would raise public criticism of the UC, and he began tracking Abe's schedule during the House of Councillors election campaign. The prosecution emphasized that the crime was unprecedented in postwar Japan.

=== Witnesses for the prosecution ===
==== Kei Satō ====
Kei Satō was the candidate in the upcoming election who received Abe's endorsement speech on the day of the assassination. On 29 October, He testified that he had been informed by his aides on the afternoon of the previous day that Abe's campaign appearance at Yamato-Saidaiji Station had been hastily finalised. Satō was standing less than one metre from Abe when he heard the first shot. Satō condemned Yamagami's act as an attempt to silence speech through violence, describing it as an unforgivable affront to democracy.

==== Police officer A ====
On 30 October, the police officer deployed to Yamato-Saidaiji Station for security testified that he witnessed Yamagami use a firearm resembling a bazooka to shoot at Abe a second time. When he rushed in and restrained Yamagami, he heard the suspect murmur "did that hit (当たったか)?" He testified that Yamagami offered no resistance during the arrest.

==== Police officer B ====
On 4 November, the police officer assigned to investigate the shooting scene testified that a total of 12 projectiles were discharged in the two shots fired by Yamagami. Video evidence showed the hair of a man standing behind Abe being pushed upward, indicating that Yamagami's shots had a significant chance of striking bystanders.

==== Police officer C ====
On 5 November, the police officer assigned to search Yamagami's residence testified that investigators found items including six homemade firearms, telescopic sights, cartridge cases, more than 20 kg of gunpowder stored in metal or plastic containers, and books related to murder. He described Yamagami's room as resembling a terrorist hideout.

=== Yamagami's firearms ===
On 6 November, the prosecution presented in court the homemade firearm used in the assassination. Investigators conducted test-firing and measured a projectile speed of about 720 kilometres per hour, with the shot capable of penetrating four plywood boards. They stated that the weapon produced more than ten times the energy required to kill a person or animal. The prosecution also showed laboratory video footage demonstrating that the trajectories of all six projectiles dispersed widely upon firing. The defense argued that the weight, shape, and other characteristics of Yamagami's firearm did not meet the statutory definition of a firearm under the Firearm and Sword Control Law.

=== Witnesses for the defense ===
==== Yamagami's mother ====
On 13 November, Yamagami's mother made her first appearance as a witness for the defense. Her physical appearance was concealed by portable partitions from the gallery.

- She stated that she felt deep remorse upon learning of her son's involvement in the assassination. Unable to apologize directly, she instead offered a public apology in court.
- She testified that in August 1991 a young female Unification Church (UC) follower approached her at her doorstep, requested access to her family registry, and lured her to a UC facility, leading to her becoming a follower.
- She was told by the UC that her husband's suicide and her eldest son's chronic illness were the result of humanity's downfall, which could be redeemed only through monetary donations. She made an initial contribution of 20 million yen, followed by another 30 million yen eight months later, funded by her late husband's life insurance payout. She was further told that her husband would not rest peacefully because he had died by suicide, and she was persuaded to make an additional 10 million yen donation.
- Since joining the UC, she began traveling to the church's headquarters in South Korea and purchasing UC-related merchandise such as paintings and vases.
- After the death of her father (Yamagami's maternal grandfather) in 1998, who had been living with them, she sold the family home for 40 million yen and donated the entire amount to the UC. She refused to let Yamagami attend university because she prioritized making further donations for the sake of her suicidal eldest son.

On 18 November, she testified in court for the second time.

- She stated that after selling the family home, she lied to her children by telling them that the proceeds were used to repay loans for the family business. Yamagami believed her explanation and joined the Japan Maritime Self-Defense Force (JMSDF) four years later to help support the family financially. During his 3-year service in the JMSDF, she made seven trips to South Korea.
- She accumulated approximately 10 million yen in loans from banks and consumer finance companies and declared bankruptcy in 2002.
- When Yamagami attempted suicide in 2005, she was in South Korea. The attempt was not life-threatening, and she was instructed not to return to Japan immediately, which she obeyed.
- Yamagami's paternal uncle (Tōichirō Yamagami), after learning of Yamagami's suicide attempt, protested against the UC and demanded refunds of her donations. Until 2015, they received periodic refunds from the UC totaling 50 million yen. Her eldest son died by suicide that same year.
- When asked by the defense about the causes of the incident, she responded: "I think I am the one responsible for the damages (加害者). I kept donating and neglected my children. I thought things would turn out better if I devoted myself to the church."
- When asked whether she was considering leaving the church, she avoided giving a direct answer, stating, "That is not something I can answer here."
- Prosecutors questioned her about the 50 million yen portion of her approximately 100 million yen in donations that had been refunded by the UC, to which she responded that the refund process had been extremely painful.
- She said she was aware that Abe's grandfather (Nobusuke Kishi) and father Shintarō Abe had some connection to the UC, although she did not know the extent of the relationship.
- When asked whether she believed the assassination had been unavoidable, she denied this. She stated that "perhaps Tetsuya wanted to help other people in similar circumstances. Abe might not have died had I not ruined Tetsuya's life."
- During a recess in the hearing, she spoke directly to Yamagami, saying, "Te-chan, I'm sorry."

==== Yamagami's younger sister ====
Before the trial began, Yamagami's younger sister had been the only family member he agreed to meet during detention. She testified for the first time on 18 November, also shielded from the gallery by partitions, similar to her mother.

- She stated that she had never spoken about her childhood to anyone prior to the trial, explaining that the memories were so painful she would cry whenever she recalled them and had long wished to forget them.
- She recounted that when she suffered from a high fever, their mother neglected her to attend religious activities instead; that even after their grandfather's death, their mother insisted on making further donations.
- She had believed the siblings would have been better off placed in a children's home.
- She testified that she regarded the UC as responsible for the distress experienced by their family.

On 19 November, she continued her testimony.

- She described their mother's room as being decorated with a photograph of the UC founder Moon Sun-myung, an altar, and a vase, and recalled that watching her mother pray by candlelight frightened her.
- During secondary school she had been ordered to remain a virgin until marriage and instructed to accept sweets distributed by the church, or else face her mother's anger.
- When she considered attending university, her mother told her there was no money and that she would have to manage on her own.
- She recounted an incident in which when the defendant was away serving in the JMSDF, the eldest brother, armed with a kitchen knife, assaulted their mother during an argument over donations, leaving the mother with a broken rib after a fall down the stairs.
- After the eldest brother later died by suicide, the defendant spent an entire night beside his body at the funeral in remorse. From that point, the defendant distanced himself from her.
- After moving out, she said, her mother contacted her only to request money for religious travel to South Korea, and she recalled being repulsed when her mother spoke glowingly of "contributing" while dragging her by the arm along the street for several dozen metres. She did not acknowledge the woman to be her mother, but a mere UC follower pretending to be her mother.
- She attempted to obtain outside assistance, but said there had been no legal means for the children to intervene because their mother, as an adult, was freely making the donations.
- She testified that it was not incomprehensible that the defendant had targeted Abe, noting that their mother's room contained UC publications featuring him on the cover. Her aunt, who was also a UC follower, demanded that the family cast their votes for candidates of Abe's party during elections, and watch Abe's video message for a UC-related organization.
- Under questioning by prosecutors, she expressed affection for the defendant.
- When asked whether she sought revenge against the church, she replied that she did not wish to become involved in vengeance, although she hinted at the possibility were she capable of doing so.

==== Hiroshi Yamaguchi ====
Hiroshi Yamaguchi is a lawyer and a representative of the anti-cult lawyers network Zenkoku Benren. The network had sent a public protest against Abe's growing endorsement for the UC, which was rejected by Abe. Yamaguchi testified for the defense on 19 November. He explained that the way Yamagami's mother was approached and drawn to a UC facility for membership by a UC follower who initially concealed their identity or intentions was a common practice of the UC. Once the UC obtained a copy of a target's family registry (戸籍謄本), they would persuade the individual to make large donations for the supposed prosperity of their family. Yamaguchi stated that the lawyers network had been aware of issues affecting shūkyō niseis (children of religious parents) like the defendant for about 20 years, but lacked the capacity to take substantial measures to assist them. He added that cases in which children's income was taken by their religious parents for donations, resulting in poverty, were widespread among shūkyō niseis.

==== Shinichi Kamiya ====
Shinichi Kamiya (神谷 慎一) is a lawyer and a member of Zenkoku Benren. A former UC follower, he has provided legal assistance to many shūkyō niseis since leaving the organization. He testified on 19 November that the UC imposed donation quotas on its followers to pressure them, and that adherents were often unconcerned about falling into bankruptcy as a result of excessive contributions. Kamiya stated that parents deeply immersed in the religion frequently prioritized participation in religious activities over the care of their children, leading to inadequate diet or hygiene for those children. He added that such parents believed their devotion would bring salvation to their children, while any deviation from the faith risked consigning them to hell. When asked about the assassination, Kamiya testified that he knew individuals who had expressed thoughts of committing a similar act had the defendant not acted first. He also stated that some people he knew believed Abe's endorsement video for a UC-related organization could lead to an incident like the assassination.

=== Direct interrogation of Yamagami ===
On 20 November, direct interrogation of Yamagami commenced.

==== Questions by the defense (20 November) ====
- When asked about his view of his own life following the incident, he stated that he felt he "should not have continued living," explaining that he believed he had caused an enormous disturbance and inconvenience to society as a result of the assassination.
- Regarding his mother, he said he did not consider her to be a fundamentally bad person, yet he struggled to understand the reasoning behind her large-scale donations. He added that he wished those contributions had not been so excessive.
- He recounted several episodes from his childhood involving his grandfather's strong opposition to the mother's donations. In one incident, the grandfather, enraged over the financial strain, held a kitchen knife and spoke as though prepared to die along with his daughter. On another occasion, the grandfather barred the mother from entering the house by collecting all the keys. When the children attempted to open the door for her, the grandfather forced all three siblings out of the home as well. The defendant recalled wandering around their neighborhood and sitting at a train station platform for several hours after being expelled.
- When he was serving in the JMSDF, his mother repeatedly contacted the base asking him for money. At the end of 2004, when he declined one such request, she told him she had gone bankrupt due to her donations. This revelation left him shocked and made him feel betrayed, given the religious teaching that sincere contributions would bring salvation and not lead to ruin.
- A few months after this phone call, he applied for a life-insurance policy naming his eldest brother and younger sister as beneficiaries and then attempted suicide in 2005, stating that he believed leaving insurance funds behind—following the example of his father's earlier suicide—felt like fulfilling what he viewed as his role.

==== Questions by the defense (25 November) ====
- Although it was not his intention, Yamagami felt obliged to assume responsibility for the financial problems affecting his mother and eldest brother. He said that his 2005 suicide attempt stemmed from guilt over an argument about university entrance during which he struck his eldest brother.
- He spent money to enable his sister, who had good grades, to attend university, because she had been pressured to send money to their eldest brother and mother, which he considered an unfair burden on her.
- Yamagami reflected on his brother's suicide. He said his brother had wanted to attend university, but he had ignored that wish and continued to oppose it, leaving his brother unable to pursue what he wanted. Yamagami remarked that his brother must have felt deep frustration, and he choked up while speaking about it.
- Regarding his mother's false explanation in 1998 that the family house was sold to repay their grandfather's business debts, he said that learning the truth—that the sale had been to fund her donations—gave him a sense of relief. He stated that part of his long-held sense of inadequacy had stemmed from believing the lie.
- During the funeral of his eldest brother, followers from the Nara branch of the UC attended and unilaterally changed the ceremony to a UC-style format despite Yamagami's objections. He stated that this left him deeply depressed.
- Yamagami's thoughts of killing someone first emerged around 2005, the same year he attempted suicide. In 2006–2007, when a UC leader visited Osaka, he went near the venue carrying a knife and tear gas. In 2018, he considered attacking a UC event at Saitama Super Arena but abandoned the plan because the venue was too large. Shortly afterward, he went to a gymnasium in Okayama Prefecture where another UC leader was scheduled to appear, again carrying a knife and tear gas, but withdrew after observing the security setup.
- He also planned an attack in October 2019 using homemade Molotov cocktails. He went to an airport in Aichi Prefecture where UC leaders were expected to arrive, but was unable to locate them and ended up throwing the Molotovs into the sea.
- Around 2021, he began considering the use of homemade firearms. He explained that he had a strong psychological aversion to stabbing someone with a knife, and that attacking from a distance would lessen the mental burden.
- He became aware of Abe's ties to the UC from a 2006 congratulatory message sent by Abe, then Chief Cabinet Secretary, to a UC-affiliated event. He recalled speaking with a member of the UC Nara branch who told him that Abe understood their doctrine, and he was their "ally" (味方). Around 2013, through online searches, he further learned about the Abe family's connections to the UC dating back to Abe's grandfather, Nobusuke Kishi.
- He focused on online information and blogs written by former followers. One of the sites he accessed most frequently was "Almost Daily Cult News" (やや日刊カルト新聞), whose UC-related articles were contributed by journalists Yoshirō Fujikura and Eito Suzuki.
- He learned many cabinet ministers from Abe's second administration, as well as other Diet members, attended UC-related events, which he viewed negatively. Because Abe served as prime minister for an extended period, Yamagami believed his endorsement would strengthen the UC's social legitimacy while diminishing public awareness of its problems, which he considered deeply regrettable and unacceptable for victims of the UC. Toward Abe personally, he described his feelings not as anger but as a sense of hopelessness and danger.

==== Questions by the prosecution (25 November) ====
- Yamagami had made around ten firearms. One reason, he explained, was uncertainty about their power output; he adjusted the barrel length in hopes of increasing their effectiveness.
- In his initial plan to attack senior UC figures, he believed he would need three guns: one for the shooting itself, a second for use while fleeing, and a third to keep inside the getaway vehicle.
- He spent his leisure time focusing on manufacturing firearms and gunpowder.
- The design of his homemade firearms was based on overseas videos and video games.
- Although Abe had been one of the potential targets, he stated that his decision was not finalised until around July 2022.

==== Questions by the prosecution (2 December) ====
- Yamagami stated that he learned of Abe's planned appearance at Yamato-Saidaiji Station on the previous day, 7 July 2022, after returning home from Okayama, where he had abandoned an earlier attempt due to heavy security at the campaign venue. He felt that Abe appearing at a train station in his home city with comparatively relaxed security "could not be a coincidence."
- On the day of the assassination, he removed the safety device from his homemade firearm in the restroom of a commercial facility near Yamato-Saidaiji Station. When Abe began his speech in support of Kei Satō, Yamagami positioned himself behind Abe across a road and waited for an opportunity to approach. Noticing that security personnel were momentarily distracted by a passing bicycle or cart, he stepped onto the road, approached Abe, aimed at his upper body, and fired.
- He also explained why he had fired at a UC-related facility in Nara the previous day. Even though he had already decided to target Abe, he wanted to signal that his underlying grievance was directed at the UC.

==== Questions by the judges ====
On 2 December, the judges asked Yamagami why he chose to target Abe. He responded that he initially did not harbor strong feelings against Abe, but after watching Abe's video message to an organization affiliated with the UC, a sense of revulsion and hostility gradually intensified. When asked whether he had considered targeting other individuals, Yamagami said that while he once considered Japanese executives of the UC on his hit list, but after reconsideration, he believed that because the UC was based in South Korea, attacking Japanese UC executives would not meet his goal of eradicating issues like (excessive) donations or family discord. He viewed Abe as the central figure in the political connections of the UC, and that choosing another target would have weakened the "message" he intended to send.

==== Hideyoshi Sakurai ====
After Yamagami's questioning concluded on 2 December, Hideyoshi Sakurai, a specially appointed professor of sociology of religion at Hokkaido University, testified as a witness. Prior to the trial, he had met Yamagami in the detention center five times, with each session lasting about two hours, and had also interviewed Yamagami's sister. Sakurai stated that Yamagami had made considerable efforts in life but was unable to secure the kind of employment he hoped for. In reviewing his experiences, his resentment toward the UC intensified and eventually became intertwined with his preparations for the attack. According to Sakurai, Yamagami's childhood was marked by constant family conflict related to his mother's religious donations. During this period, he assumed premature adult responsibilities—restraining his violent older brother and supporting a mother who neglected both emotional and financial caregiving duties. Sakurai characterized this kind of unreasonable emotional and practical burden as common among shūkyō niseis. He described Yamagami as an "adult child" who had long struggled with an inability to express himself, and whose acceptance of unfair circumstances and tendency toward altruistic behavior followed a pattern seen in many shūkyō niseis of such religious environments.

==== Questions by the prosecution (3 December) ====
On 3 December, the prosecution arranged for Abe's widow, Akie Abe, to sit beside the prosecutors under the victim participation system, which allows relatives of victims to take part in the proceedings. Yamagami did not look toward Akie during the hearing, keeping his attention on the documents before him. The prosecution asked whether Yamagami had ever expressed any apology to Abe's bereaved family; he acknowledged that he had not. The prosecutors then stated that Abe's emergency medical treatment had cost over 3 million yen and that the mutual aid association for national public servants had requested repayment from Yamagami, but he had not paid the amount. Yamagami responded that he lacked the funds to do so. He added that although he had received monetary contributions from supporters, he intended to return the donations if those supporters came to see that he was not the person they imagined. The prosecution further asked whether the total amount of money he had received during detention exceeded 6 million yen. Yamagami said he could not provide an exact figure, noting only that it amounted to several million yen. When asked whether he had transferred about 1 million yen to his younger sister, he again declined to disclose the specific amount.

==== Questions by the defense (4 December) ====
On 4 December, the final day of the defendant's questioning took place, this time without the attendance of Akie Abe. The defense asked Yamagami whether he had any message for her. Yamagami replied that he held no animosity toward the family of the former prime minister and said, "There is no doubt that I caused you to suffer for the past three and a half years. ... I have also experienced the loss of family members, so there is no excuse for what I have done. I am deeply sorry." This was the first time since the assassination that Yamagami offered a direct apology to Abe's bereaved family.

=== Sentencing requests ===
On 18 December, at the beginning of the last hearing of the trial, Akie Abe's lawyer read her statement in court:

My husband believed that "Japan should bloom proudly at the center of the world." He once told me, "Politics is something you do at the risk of your life. If the time ever comes—if I were to die—make sure you issue a dignified statement." I felt my chest tighten. I never imagined that such a day would actually come.

Many things have been said about this incident by the media and others, but I came to court because I wanted to see for myself what kind of feelings the defendant had when he took my husband's life.

The sense of loss will never disappear for the rest of my life. I ask that he face what he has done directly and properly atone for his crime.

The prosecution requested a sentence of life imprisonment for Yamagami. They did not deny the fact that the defendant suffered an ill-fated past, but argued that the killing of a former prime minister was an extremely grave crime with profound social consequences. The prosecution rejected the defense's argument that Yamagami's upbringing and experiences related to the UC should substantially mitigate his responsibility, stating that these circumstances could not justify the taking of a human life. The defense argued that a life imprisonment would be too severe, and instead called for a fixed-term sentence of 20 years' imprisonment, emphasizing Yamagami's lack of prior criminal record and the psychological and financial harm he allegedly suffered as a result of his family's involvement with the religious organization. At the conclusion of the hearing, Yamagami declined to make a final statement, indicating that he had nothing further to say.

=== Sentencing ===
On 21 January 2026, Yamagami was sentenced to life imprisonment. After the conclusion of the first instance trial, Hideyoshi Sakurai stated that Yamagami appeared to be accepting of the outcome and expressed no objection to the verdict. Yamagami's uncle, Tōichirō Yamagami, a retired attorney, criticized the ruling as "outdated" (時代遅れ), arguing that it failed to take into account the unprecedented consequences of the incident, the effects of which persisted at the time of the decision. These included the dissolution order against the UC and the ongoing prosecutor investigation into the ruling party's controversial financing. He described the verdict as inadequate for its narrow focus and lack of consideration of the broader context (木を見て森を見ない). On 4 February 2026, Yamagami's defense filed an appeal with the Osaka High Court.
