= Criticism of the Unification Church in Japan =

The Unification Church in Japan was criticized by the National Network of Lawyers Against Spiritual Sales for being involved in several controversies including "spiritual sales", unlawful adoption practices and a change of name to mask its purposes, according to reports. The Unification Church was founded by Reverend Sun Myung Moon in 1954 in South Korea. Moon claimed to have had a vision of Jesus at age 16, prompting him to preach a new doctrine starting in 1946 in North Korea. After fleeing to South Korea, he established the church. It expanded to Japan in 1958, helped by the Cold War's anti-communist climate, connecting with Japanese politicians and establishing the Asian People's Anti-Communist League. The reunification of Korea and anti-communism were the main goals of the Unification Church.

== Background ==
According to research by Elif Sercen Nurcan, Meiji University, Japan and Mursel Dogrul, Turkish National Defense University, since 1971, the Unification Church has been preaching that Japan betrayed Korea because of its invasion and that it must pay for its sins. Because of this teaching, Japanese church members were pressured to donate huge sums of money to erase "negative ancestral karma'', a tactic called "spiritual sales". Church members are instructed to buy statues, prayer beads, etc. from the church at extremely high prices. Spiritual sales, as a social problem, has been raised in Japan's National Diet since the 1980s. In 1993, the Fukuoka District Court found the leadership of UC to be guilty of this practice.

The Unification Church maintained very good relations with the Abe family through 3 generations. Abe's grandfather Kishi allowed the UC to use his official residence for its activities and attended their meetings as well as those of an anti-communist organization known as the "International Federation for Victory over Communism".

In 2022, former Japanese Prime Minister Shinzō Abe was shot during a campaign speech in the city of Nara. According to the Guardian, the killer, Tetsuya Yamagami, a gunman with a grudge against UC, turned his focus to Abe because of his association with the Unification Church, after seeing Abe delivering a recorded address at an online event sponsored by an affiliated organization. Yamagami admitted that he opposed Abe's support for the Unification Church, which sparked public interest in Japanese politicians' ties to the church.

After Abe's death, reports emerged of the church's close ties to politicians, particularly from the ruling Liberal Democratic Party. In response to these reports, Kishida ordered party members to sever their ties with the Unification Church. He also launched an investigation into the financing of the church's activities around the world. In its response, the church denied any wrongdoing and promised to prevent "excessive" donations from members. The Ministry of Education spent a year investigating the church and its internal documents and collected testimonies from people about its finances and allegations of excessive donations. The government stated that it had discovered the illegal actions of the church.

Today, the church has 50,000 to 70,000 members in Japan. It has faced criticism for "spiritual sales" and unlawful adoption practices, from groups like the National Network of Lawyers Against Spiritual Sales. The Japanese government is considering stripping the church of its religious status, which the church defends as based on "biased information" from leftist groups and denies any wrongdoing.

The church promises to prevent excessive donations and continues to defend its actions.

== Rebranding ==
In 1997, the Japanese Unification Church applied to the Agency for Cultural Affairs (ACA), a department directly under the Ministry of Education, Culture, Sports, Science and Technology, to change its name from "The Holy Spirit Association for the Unification of World Christianity" (世界基督教統一神霊協会) to "Family Federation for World Peace and Unification" (世界平和統一家庭連合). According to the then chief of the Religious Affairs Division, Kihei Maekawa, the application was rejected by the ACA because the church was involved in civil lawsuits under its old name at the time.

In 2015, while Hakubun Shimomura was Minister of Education, Culture, Sports, Science and Technology under the Third Abe Cabinet, the Unification Church again applied to change its name, and this time it was approved. Shimomura denied any involvement in the approval process, explaining that the decision was made by the head of the ACA, but acknowledged he had received reports about it and that this was unusual. The 2015 head of the ACA confirmed Shimomura's description of events.

== Spiritual sales ==
According to two former church officials, Hiroaki Soejima and Inoue who spoke with The Washington Post in 1984, most of the international Unification Church's financial support has come from Japan, since the 1970s. $800 million they said were transferred from Japan to the United States between 1975 and 1984. Religious icons (marble vases, miniature treasure pagodas, and other religious icons) were distributed by Happy World Inc. and said to possess supernatural powers that were allegedly connected to the church. Hiroshi Sakazume, former Japanese Unification Church's director general of public relations denied the church had any relationship with Happy World, claiming "the Unification Church has nothing to do with sales activities". "We don't know what each church member is doing. But as a church, we don't do any sales [...] Happy World is a different company, a separate organization."

The Unification Church employed assertive tactics when soliciting money from Japanese recruits, characterized by their persistence. Recruits were informed that donating money to the church was necessary to alleviate the suffering of their ancestors in hell due to past sins. Additionally, recruiters would inquire about recruits' personal struggles and financial situations. A legal network in Japan aimed at reclaiming donations from former members and employees of the church has filed around 35,000 compensation claims, resulting in the recovery of over $206 million since 1987.

The National Network of Lawyers against spiritual sales accuses the Unification Church of engaging in "Spiritual Sales", alleging it has made its adherents invest large amounts of money to the point of bankruptcy. The Unification Church's president in Japan, Tomihiro Tanaka, stated any trouble with illegal solicitation and large donations were a thing of the past and since 2009 has had no trouble due to stress on legal compliance. The Network of Lawyers was set up in 1987 to impose countermeasures to what has been perceived as damages amounting to 123.7 billion yen caused by the Unification Church, based on statistics compiled by the association's lawyers between 1987 and 2021, obtained via 34,537 complaints submitted to Government Consumer centers. The network reported about 300 million yen in 2021.

Hiroshi Yamaguchi claimed the Unification Church has caused considerable pain to families of donors. Yasuo Kawai suggested it negatively impacts families and accused Japanese politicians and administrators of taking no action against the Unification Church for over 30 years. Kito Masaki called for Japan's National Diet to conduct a bipartisan investigation. Tak Ji-il asserted the Unification Church "is a business based on religion" and is motivated by financial concerns rather than religious principles.

Akahata and Shoichi Fujita (Religious Information Research Center) and the Zenkoku genriundo higaisha fubo no kai (lit. National Association of Parents of Victims of the Moonism) claimed that the Unification Church views Japan as having a historical obligation to serve Korea due to past aggression, leading to financial fraud through "fortune telling". Yoshifu Arita suggested the Church exploits young Japanese people's guilt over Japan's colonial rule of Korea to defraud them.

Tomihiro Tanaka argued donations are made voluntarily by the individuals themselves, with amounts based on the individual's beliefs, at the same time acknowledging that people had donated large sums of money in the past. and stated there were no teachings on how much one can contribute to how much was needed to donate to be saved, nor were there any instructions that obliged families in bankruptcy to donate even more. Tanaka claimed at a press conference that the Unification Church had had problems with its followers in the past due to illegal solicitations and large donations. He claimed that since 2009, when it began to emphasize legal compliance, there had been no trouble between the Unification Church and its followers. They stated donation amounts are determined by individual members. In an interview conducted with Japanese believers, Kook Jin Moon claimed the church was not pressuring its Japanese members to make large donations in order save their deceased loved ones, stating instead the members informed him it was their own ancestors that instructed them to make large donations.

Japanese courts ordered the Unification Church to compensate plaintiffs, declaring its missionary work illegal. In 2009, the Tokyo District Court issued a suspended prison sentence to Unification Church members for pressuring passersby to buy expensive seals, ruling that their actions involved exploiting anxiety about ancestral pasts.

On December 10, 2022, Japan enacted a new law aimed at providing relief to individuals affected by the Unification Church, along with an amendment to the Consumer Contract Act. The bipartisan-supported law will prohibit coercive donation solicitations and impose criminal penalties for non-compliance, granting individuals the right to revoke donations made under undue influence and extending the period for contract revocation related to spiritual sales.

== Assassination of Shinzo Abe ==
On 8 July 2022, Shinzo Abe was assassinated by former Maritime Self-Defense Force seaman Tetsuya Yamagami, whose mother is said to be a member of the Japanese Unification Church since 1998. Yamagami claimed the church was behind his family's financial situation, making his mother donate most of the family fortune to the church, and saw Abe as "deeply connected" to the church. The assassination prompted sympathy for Yamagami, and also increased scrutiny of the Unification Church and the LDP, leading to backlash against them. It was found that almost half of the 379 National Diet (parliament) members of Abe's Liberal Democratic Party "admitted to some kind of contact with the Unification Church". The church "maintained a volunteer army" of members to work on political campaigns for Abe and other politicians in his party. Journalist Robert F. Worth writes that the believers he talked to "described a litany of insults and abuses" they had been subject to in the year since the assassination.

The Unification Church is said to have historically had a close relationship with the conservative Liberal Democratic Party. In 2019, the National Network of Lawyers Against Spiritual Sales protested in writing Abe's congratulatory messages sent to events affiliated to the Unification Church in fear such messages enhanced the church's authority and encouraged what they considered its "anti-social activities".

Yamagami's mother reportedly sold land she inherited from her father along with the house she lived in with her 3 children. In June 1999, she donated about 100 million yen (US$720,000) to the Unification Church, half of which was said to have been returned according to Reuters, leading to her family's bankruptcy in 2002 and significantly affecting their family, according to Yamagami. He also claimed he was unable to enter university despite graduating from a prestigious high school. His relatives, however, said Yamagami gave up on university after multiple attempts to enroll but was only offered a place at Nara Sangyo University, because it was not his preferred choice. His brother and his father would later commit suicide. Yamagami stated that his original plan was to assassinate Hak Ja Han. However, he gave up his plan because he could not get close to her. He believes Abe and his grandfather, Nobusuke Kishi, spread the Unification Church in Japan and decided to kill Abe after discovering online that Abe had sent video messages to organizations affiliated with the Unification Church.

Police authorities were instructed by the chair of The National Public Safety Commission Satoshi Ninoyu alleged to have promoted a Unification Church event in 2021, to set up a panel to investigate the security lapses thought to have been involved in Abe's death. Japan's Constitutional Democratic Party of Japan, the Democratic Party for the People and the Japanese Communist Party, expressed their intentions to launch separate investigations into the Unification Church's political influence and connections in Japanese politics. On August 31, 2022, the ruling Liberal Democratic Party announced that it would no longer have any relationships with the Unification Church and its related organizations, and announced it would expel any members that did not break any ongoing relationships with the Unification Church. Prime Minister Fumio Kishida announced in October 2022 the Japanese government would start an investigation into the extent of Abe's relationship with the Unification Church.

== Revocation of religious corporation status ==
On September 6, 2023, Minister Keiko Nagaoka of the Japanese Ministry of Education, Culture, Sports, Science, and Technology announced the ministry's decision to file an administrative fine against the church with the Tokyo District Court. The action was prompted by the church's perceived lack of cooperation in responding to the ministry's inquiries during their investigation to determine if there was sufficient evidence of wrongdoing to justify revoking the church's religious corporation status.

During the government probe, the ministry conducted confidential hearings with Unification Church victims and the National Network of Lawyers Against Spiritual Sales (Zenkoku Benren) to build the case against the church. On 12 October 2023, the ministry formally declared its intent to seek a "Dissolution Order" under Article 81 of the Religious Juridical Person Law against the Unification Church. This decision was driven by the presentation of evidence suggesting that the church's objectives had deviated from legitimate religious practices, potentially impacting public welfare through its activities.

Masahito Moriyama stated that the Unification Church's actions involved manipulating public psychological distress to accumulate funds. These funds, leading to civil claims from affected parties, served as grounds for the dissolution order. Prime Minister Fumio Kishida expressed agreement, noting that the decision to propose a dissolution order was based on objective facts and rigorous judgment.

In contrast to previous instances where dissolution orders were pursued due to criminal convictions, this is the first instance of a religious organization being subjected to such an order without a criminal conviction. Before this, only two religious organizations faced dissolution proceedings initiated by the government: Aum Shinrikyo in 1996, concerning its involvement in the 1995 Tokyo subway sarin gas attack, and Wakayama Myōkakuji in 2002, for fraud conviction. These cases were subjected to legal proceedings lasting 7 months and 3 years, respectively.

Should the court approve the dissolution order, the Unification Church will lose its tax benefits associated with registered religious organizations. Despite this, the Unification Church can continue its operations and missionary activities within Japan under the constitutionally granted freedom of religion. However, the Japan Times editor believed that such an order would damage the Unification Church's reputation.

The church has indicated its intention to contest the charge and dissolution order through legal means, asserting that they will do so thoroughly. The church also contended that the ministry's exercise of the right to question against them was illegal.

On 7 March 2024, while the court hearing for the dissolution case was still ongoing, the Japanese government, under the new law passed in December 2023, approved a plan to subject the church to stricter monitoring of its assets in anticipation of providing relief to victims of unfair solicitation.

On 25 March 2025, the Tokyo District Count upheld the dissolution order, but the church immediately appealed the ruling to the Tokyo High Court. The Tokyo High Court upheld the District Court's ruling to dissolve the church on 4 March 2026. The church appealed to the Supreme Court of Japan, where the court upheld the High Court's ruling on 22 June 2026.

== Civil lawsuits against Japanese critics and government ==
The Unification Church, its followers, and associated organizations have filed a series of lawsuits against Japanese broadcasting stations, lawyers, journalists and former believer who publicly discussed issues such as fundraising and proselyting practices of the church. These issues came under heavy scrutiny as the ties between the church and Japanese politicians were exposed following Abe's assassination. The Toyama City Council was targeted for declaring the severance of any ties with the church.

Defendants perceived these lawsuits as strategic lawsuits against public participation (SLAPP) aimed at stifling discussions that could be detrimental to the church.

List of lawsuits against UC opposition
Case	Filing date	Complaint	Demands	Verdict
Unification Church v. Yomiuri TV & Masaki Kito	2022-09-29	Kito's statement about "female believers being forced into prostitution after the founder's death" aired by Yomiuri TV on 20 July 2022.	22 million yen and public apology	
Unification Church v. Yomiuri TV & Kentarō Motomura	2022-09-29	Motomura's statement which accused the church of "illegal proselyting practices" aired by Yomiuri TV on 2 September 2022.	22 million yen and public apology	Dismissed on 25 January 2024
Unification Church v. TBS TV & Hideki Yashiro	2022-09-29	Yashiro's statement which accused the church of "causing numerous consumer disputes" aired by TBS TV on 1 September 2022.	22 million yen and public apology	Dismissed on 30 June 2023
Unification Church v. Nippon TV & Yoshifu Arita	2022-10-27	Arita's statement which accused the church of "anti-social organization for spiritual sales" aired by Nippon TV on 19 August 2022.	22 million yen and public apology	
Unification Church v. TBS Radio & Masaki Kito	2022-10-27	Kito's statement which accused the church of "faking own followers deprogrammed by violent group" broadcast by TBS Radio on 9 September 2022.	11 million yen and public apology	
Unification Church v. Noriko Ishigaki	2022-11	Sayuri Ogawa's statement about "her parents donated large sum of money for the church" during a hearing with the Constitutional Democratic Party published online by lawmaker Noriko Ishigaki in November 2022. (The case was nominally against Ishigaki, but in fact targeted Ogawa, the former follower turned critic and activist against the church.)	Delete the published video	Dismissed by the high court in August 2023
Makoto Yasuda v. Toyama City	2022-12-16	Toyama City Council passed the resolution of severing ties to the Unification Church and its associated organizations in September 2022. (Yasuda is the pseudonym of a Unification Church follower living in Toyama. "Toyama Prefecture Peace Ambassadors Council" is managed by a PR officer for the church.)	3.5 million yen and rollback of the resolution	
Toyama Prefecture Peace Ambassadors Council v. Toyama City	2023-08-01	Toyama City Council passed the resolution of severing ties to the Unification Church and its associated organizations in September 2022. (Yasuda is the pseudonym of a Unification Church follower living in Toyama. "Toyama Prefecture Peace Ambassadors Council" is managed by a PR officer for the church.)	22 million yen	
Women's Federation For World Peace v. Zenkoku Benren Seven	2023-07-03	Seven lawyers with Zenkoku Benren, namely Masaki Kito, Keiichi Hiraiwa, Masaki Gorō, Shūji Nakamura, Hidemasa Kawada, Hiroshi Yamaguchi, and Yasuo Kawai, lobbied Japanese municipal governments to deny public venues for Women's Federation For World Peace on 15 June 2023.	33 million yen	
Toru Gotō v. Eito Suzuki	2023-10-04	Suzuki's statement about "Toru Gotō being a hikikomori" published on social media. (Gotō was unsuccessfully deprogrammed from the Unification Church by his family.)	11 million yen and delete the online post	The district court ruled in Gotō's favor and awarded 110 thousand yen in damage. Suzuki appealed and the high court overturned the district court ruling.
Universal Peace Federation v. Eito Suzuki	2023-10-04	Suzuki's statement about "Shinzo Abe getting paid for his 2021 video speech at an event by the Universal Peace Federation (UPF)". (UPF claimed that they did not pay Abe's 2021 video speech, while admitting that Donald Trump, who also gave the video speech at the same event, was indeed paid.)	11 million yen	The district court ruled in Suzuki's favor.

== Child adoption ==
The Unification Church came under investigation by Japan's Ministry of Health, Labour and Welfare for allegations about organizing children being transferred between members' families without authorization from the prefectural government. The authorization requirement came into effect in 2018 and if convicted of violation the offender would face imprisonment or a fine. The church reported that there were 31 known adoptions between 2018 and 2022 when questioned by the welfare ministry. Under the Japanese Civil Code, adoptions involving minors require permission from family courts. The issue at hand also raises questions about whether family courts' screening was sufficient. The church denies the allegation that they act as an agent in the arrangement but says that the child adoptions happen between families privately. In publications targeting its followers, the church stated that once families agree on adoption, they were to report it to the group's family education bureau. The welfare ministry indicated that such a rule makes the group perceived as mediating adoptions. The welfare ministry's investigation into the matter has no enforcing power, however, and it doesn't know in detail when adoptions took place or which families were involved.

At the same time, the religious group insists that there has been no organized involvement for about 20 years and that adoptions have been personal unions between followers.

The ministry requested that the church revise its teachings about children to comply with Japan's child welfare laws. Some adoptees complained to the ministry and media that they are emotionally traumatized after learning their adoptions were religiously motivated. On February 1, 2023, the Unification Church of Japan revised their believers' handbook to remove references to child adoption.

The Ministry of Health, Labour and Welfare submitted several questionnaires about the child adoption practice to the Unification Church between November and December 2022, but in the second inquiry the Unification Church refused to answer more than half of the questions, and sent a letter of protest to the ministry.
