= Sayuri Ogawa =

Japanese anti-cult activist (born 1996)

Sayuri Ogawa (Japanese: 小川 さゆり; born c. 1996 (Note: In a September 2022 special news program by TBS News which features Ogawa, Yasuhiro Hanashi and Masaki Kito, Ogawa was noted as "26 years old". In a May 2023 short documentary about Sayuri Ogawa and her family produced and broadcast by Fuji News Network, she was noted as "27 years old".)) is the pseudonym of a Japanese woman who was a former follower of the Unification Church (UC). She left her parents and the church at the age of 20 after suffering sexual harassment and religious abuse. Since the assassination of Shinzo Abe, the former prime minister of Japan, on 8 July 2022, she has become an anti-cult activist, appearing in government hearings and media interviews to address issues related to the malpractices of new religious organisations, particularly concerning the welfare of shūkyō nisei (宗教二世, children from religious families). Ogawa is a shūkyō nisei, specifically a "blessed second generation" (祝福二世) or "child of god" (神の子), as she was born to a couple paired by the UC in its mass wedding.

== Background ==
=== Early life ===
Sayuri Ogawa was born as the eldest daughter among six siblings. Her parents were devoted followers of the Unification Church (UC) and their marriage was through a mass wedding ceremony of the UC. Ogawa's mother was a full-time housewife but often had to be away from home due to missionary duty and campaign activities, including canvassing for pro-UC politicians during elections, while her father held a district management position within the church.

Entertainment such as television and manga were considered satanic and prohibited, and attendance at worship services and prayer meetings was compulsory. Ogawa sometimes experienced extreme physical distress, including dislocating her shoulder and fainting during these activities. Despite the challenges, her parents persisted in imposing their faith. The family struggled financially due to regular donations to the church, and Ogawa faced bullying at school due to poverty. Ogawa recalled having fond memories with her parents and described them as being kind to her, despite the challenges their household faced. Therefore, she would obey her parents and engage in religious activities.

As she entered high school, Ogawa became deeply immersed in her faith in the UC. She found solace in attending church, which helped distract her from other concerns. During her third year of high school, she participated in a speech competition on the teachings of the church and achieved second place at the national level. While engaged in such activities, she attended a residential training where she experienced sexual harassment. A male team leader took her to an isolated room where no one could see them, hugged her, and took photos, making her feel uncomfortable and violated.

Even after the training ended, Ogawa received messages like, "If you do not reply, we will not meet in heaven," which left her in shock. When she confided in her parents about the incident, they attributed it to her being possessed by evil spirits, and as a result, they sent her to undergo "spiritual training" in Cheongpyeong, South Korea. The 40-day "exorcism" process left her emotionally unstable, and she reached a point where she felt compelled to write a farewell letter in which she expressed her desire to commit suicide.

=== Runaway from home and the church ===
Afterwards, her mother started using Ogawa's savings and earnings from part-time jobs without permission, causing her further distress. This happened when she was 19 years old. She sought help by visiting government offices and the police to report the abuse, but she was not taken seriously, with responses like, "It's a family matter and a religious issue." Frustrated and feeling trapped, Ogawa began isolating herself in her room. At the age of 20, she decided to run away from home and simultaneously disassociated herself from the UC. While distancing herself from her family, she continued to suffer from symptoms such as hyperpnea. In a November 2022 interview, she expressed her post-runaway struggles as follows:

I resented the church so much, but I also realized that my existence was tied to the church. I was born because of the church, and my life was shaped by the match arranged by Sun Myung Moon. (Note: Founder of the Unification Church) My identity felt like it was crumbling, and I couldn't understand my purpose. I wanted to die so badly. If there was no church, I wouldn't have been born. I think it would have been better to stay as a shinkō nisei. (Note: Shinkō nisei (信仰2世) has the same essential meaning as shūkyō nisei (宗教2世), as shinkō means "religious faith" and shūkyō means "religion".) My parents wanted me and gave birth to me to increase the number of followers, so I was born just for that purpose.

Subsequently, she met and married her husband, who is an atheist. In April 2022, she gave birth to her first son.

== Activism ==
=== Motivation by Abe's death ===
On 8 July 2022, former Prime Minister Shinzo Abe was assassinated during an election campaign in Nara. The 41-year-old prime suspect Tetsuya Yamagami was arrested at the scene. News outlets reported that Yamagami was driven by a grudge towards the UC for causing his mother's bankruptcy and Abe family's longstanding ties to the church. Consequently, the phrase shūkyō nisei trended on social media. Ogawa shared her past experiences and thoughts as a shūkyō nisei on Twitter. In one aspect, she expresses strong disapproval of the assassination, which she views as an act of terror. Conversely, she can also empathise with Yamagami, as both of them are victims of the UC, sharing similar experiences.

In the same month, she was approached by Japan News Network (JNN) through social media to appear on a featured news program and talk about the religious abuse and other challenges faced by shūkyō nisei. It was during this time that she adopted the pseudonym "Sayuri Ogawa". Later her husband adopted a similar pseudonym "Ryō Ogawa" (小川 りょう). Ogawa explained that Abe's incident made her realize that many victims share similar experiences with her, and she "wanted to eliminate the damage caused by religion", which motivated her to step forward and advocate for protecting the newer generation from similar suffering.

Abe's assassination and the revelation of ties between the UC and the ruling Liberal Democratic Party (LDP) led to a significant decline in Prime Minister Fumio Kishida's approval ratings. In response, Kishida instructed members of his political party to provide detailed explanations regarding their connections to the UC. To restore public trust, he also conducted a cabinet reshuffle in August 2022.

Subsequently, on 14 September 2022, Ogawa was invited by JNN to appear alongside Minister of Justice Yasuhiro Hanashi and anti-cult lawyer Masaki Kito on another featured news program. During the show, she directly addressed Hanashi, emphasising the challenges faced by shūkyō nisei in seeking assistance, particularly from government officials. Ogawa demanded the enactment of new laws to safeguard individuals like her from religious abuse.

Ogawa started advocating for "anti-sectarian laws" (反セクト法), modeled after the French About-Picard law, with the aim of more effectively regulating and prosecuting religious organisations that infringe upon human rights. She is seeking support from international organisations like the United Nations for this cause.

=== Press conference and legal threats ===
On 7 October 2022, accompanied by her husband, Ogawa was invited by the Foreign Correspondents' Club of Japan (FCCJ) to speak about her experiences entangled with the UC at a press conference. During the conference, they noticed two fax messages from the UC, one of which was signed by Ogawa's parents and the other signed by the lawyer representing the UC. One fax demanded an immediate end to the conference, claiming that Ogawa "is suffering from serious mental health disorders, including dissociative identity disorder that had worsened since Abe's death. This had prompted her to make inaccurate statements to the media." Another fax made legal threat against FCCJ should they refuse to comply with the UC's demand.

Despite reading the message, Ogawa chose not to comply with the demand to cease the conference. Towards the end of the event, she stated that "I believe many who are witnessing this can tell which side is evil. If you think I am on the right side, please let this organisation be dissolved." One week after the conference, the UC released a statement claiming that "we deeply care about [Ogawa's] health condition, which might worsen if she continues to make public appearances."

Former UC follower turned anti-cult journalist Fumiaki Tada commented that the way the UC attempted to stop Ogawa's conference was cruel. He condemned the church's demand as an unforgivable act of silencing shūkyō nisei. Eito Suzuki, an investigative journalist covering malpractice in the UC, commented that the church perceived Ogawa as a threat. They feared the potential impact of Ogawa's pleas reaching an international audience and that their actions have revealed their "malicious nature" in prioritising their image over the well-being of their victims like Ogawa. Suzuki warned that the church was appealing to foreign media and human rights organizations about the "religious persecution" in Japan by attacking Ogawa's character, thus portraying themselves as victims.

The UC filed a civil complaint in November 2022 against Ogawa, demanding that she retract her statement made during a meeting with the Constitutional Democratic Party. During this meeting, Ogawa claimed that her parents had made exorbitant donations. The church considered this statement to be untrue and damaging to their reputation. In March 2023, the Tokyo District Court ruled in favor of Ogawa. The judge recognised Ogawa's testimony that "donations were made when the family did not have much money left." The church immediately appealed to the Tokyo High Court, but the appeal was dismissed in August 2023.

=== Advocating for dissolving the church ===
On 11 October 2022, the National Network of Lawyers Against Spiritual Sales (Zenkoku Benren) sent an open letter to Kishida's cabinet members, demanding the activation of Article 81, the "Dissolution Order," of the Religious Juridical Person Law against the UC. This order aims to revoke the religious entity status of an organisation that is considered to operate in a manner not consistent with a legitimate religion and is detrimental to public welfare. As a result, the organisation would no longer be eligible for tax exemptions while still practicing their faith, as guaranteed by the Constitution of Japan.

A petition supporting the Dissolution Order, endorsed by Ogawa and other victims of the UC, was launched on Change.org on 17 October 2022. On 9 December 2022, the petition has garnered over 200,000 signatures and Ogawa acted as one of the representatives to deliver the petition result to the Religious Affairs Division of the Ministry of Education, Culture, Sports, Science and Technology. The plea prompted the ministry to initiate an investigation and exercise the right to question the church on 11 November 2022, indicating the potential for dissolving the church if sufficient evidence of wrongdoing is uncovered. The ministry eventually filed the dissolution order against the church with the Tokyo District Court on 13 October 2023.

=== Witnessing the passage of relief bills ===
On 2 November 2022, Ogawa was invited by the LDP to participate in a hearing about religious abuse and drafting new relief bills to help victims demand restitution who suffer financially from unfair religious fundraising activities, known as "spiritual sales" (霊感商法) in Japan. On 9 December, Ogawa participated in a senate hearing of the special panel about consumer disputes. She advocated for the necessity to help people whose lives are ruined by religion. On 10 December, along with another victim of the UC, Tatsuo Hashida (橋田 達夫), they were invited to spectate an extraordinary parliamentary session in the National Diet when the relief bills were deliberated and passed. However, lawyers of Zenkoku Benren have raised concerns about the effectiveness of the relief bills. On the other hand, Ogawa expressed her gratitude for the relief bills to be made in such a short period of time while emphasising that there are still many challenges ahead. She pleaded with the public not to forget about all the victims.

=== Other activism efforts ===
Ogawa also contributes to raising awareness about victims of other religious groups beyond the UC. In 2023, she collaborated with a third-generation member of Jehovah's Witnesses, who uses the pseudonym "Nana Natsuno" (夏野 なな), to advocate for the necessity of enacting stronger laws to safeguard their well-being. Natsuno explained that her parents were involved in religiously motivated child abuse, which included instilling fear of Armageddon if she disobeyed the church, enforcing the carrying of a card to declare refusal of blood transfusion and subjecting her to severe corporal punishment.

== Book ==
- 小川さゆり、宗教2世 [Sayuri Ogawa, Shūkyō Nisei] (in Japanese). Shogakukan. 7 March 2023. ISBN 9784093801256.

== See also ==
- Religion and children
