= Specialist school (disambiguation) =

A specialist school or specialised school is a type of school which specialises in a certain area or field of curriculum.

Specialist school may also refer to:

- Special school, a type of school for students with special educational needs
- Specialist schools in the United Kingdom, an article about specialist schools in the United Kingdom
- Specialised independent school, a type of specialist school in Singapore
- Religious school, a type of school with a religious focus
- Selective school, schools with admissions tests that often concentrate in one area of study
