= Shūkyō nisei =

Japanese children with extremely religious parents

Shūkyō nisei (宗教2世), literally 'religion second generation', is a Japanese phrase, which refers to children being raised by their parents with strong religious beliefs. These children may be forced to practice the same religion against their will by their parents. They are also called karuto nisei (カルト2世; 'cult second generation') or nisei shinja (2世信者; 'second generation follower'). These children are reportedly often challenged by hardships, such as child neglect, child abuse and lack of psychological, financial, academic, and social independence because of their religious parents and the predatory practices of the religious organization. While shūkyō nisei are a longstanding social issue in Japan, the Japanese government has been accused of inaction. Within the Unification Church, children born to the parents married in church sponsored mass wedding ceremonies are called the shukufuku nisei (祝福2世; 'blessed second generations').

In July 2022, former Japanese Prime Minister Shinzo Abe was assassinated by Tetsuya Yamagami while giving a speech at the upper election campaign in Nara, which increased media scrutiny on the matter.

== Overview ==
Testimonies from those who are concerned reveal that many of those children suffer from poverty caused by large donations that their parents make to their religious organizations. They also suffer from child neglect due to their parents disappearing for religious activities for several months at a time. Many may be suffering from being forced to accept religious demands. Examples could include prohibitions on watching television, reading manga, attending a friend's birthday party, physical contact with the opposite gender, visiting temples and shrines of other religions, and participating in other religions' events, such as Christmas.

There are cases where their human rights are violated by being prevented from enrolling in higher education or finding employment. Moreover, some are forced to live with bizarre names selected by the founder or forced to drink wine that is said to contain the guru's blood.

Some shūkyō nisei who want to abandon their faith hesitate in fear of losing their parents' love. In addition, even if they are able to leave the religious organization, they must sever relations with their parents. Therefore, they often struggle when they need a guarantor for employment or relocation of residence, which is a common requirement in Japan. Even if they consult a local government office or hotline regarding child abuse or livelihood support, freedom of religion may be entangled with receiving support, as many of these cases are handled differently from those involving livelihood protection or domestic violence. Some are told that the authorities cannot intervene in religious matters, and that family matters should be discussed within the family first and turned away. There have also been cases in which people requested restrictions on access to residential records of their new addresses in order to escape their parents, but they were denied on the grounds that the issue was one between parent and child.

=== Assassination of Shinzo Abe and its impacts on the shūkyō nisei ===
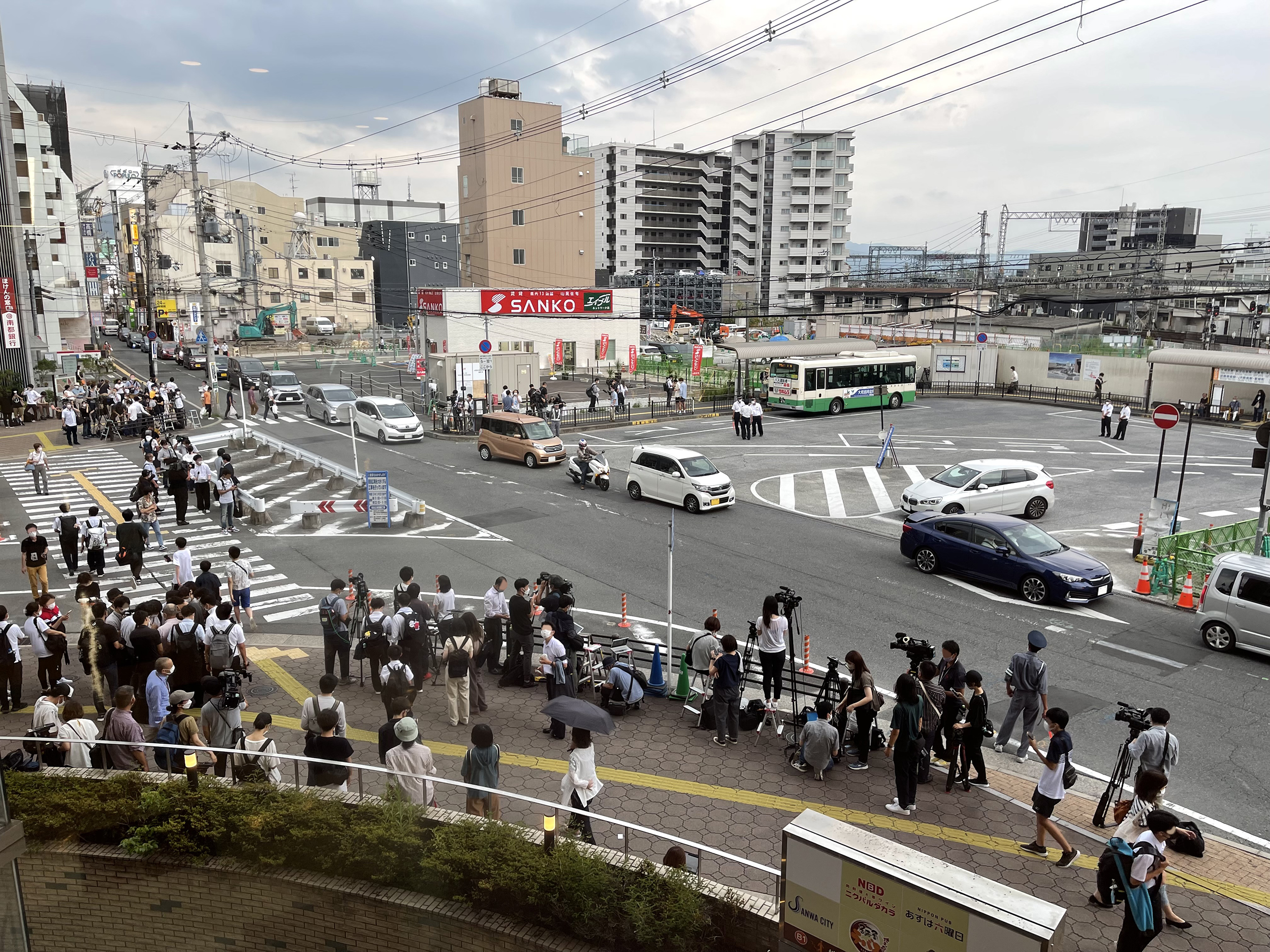
The vicinity of Kintetsu Yamato-Saidaiji station northern entrance, where former Japanese Prime Minister Shinzo Abe was assassinated, took place on July 8, 2022.

On 8 July 2022, Tetsuya Yamagami assassinated former Prime Minister Shinzo Abe while he was campaigning in Nara for a candidate in the upper house election. Yamagami stated that he targeted Abe due to his ties to the Unification Church (UC), which he blamed for ruining his family.

Yamagami's mother had joined the UC around 1998, after his father committed suicide, leaving behind three children. She donated to the church extensively – more than 100 million yen in total, including her husband's life insurance payout, which put the family in a difficult financial position, to the extent that they sometimes went hungry. She declared bankruptcy in 2002. Yamagami did well at school and was admitted to the top high school in Nara Prefecture, but could not afford to attend university. At one point he attempted suicide, hoping that the insurance payout would save his siblings from poverty.

The assassination drew attention to the plight of shūkyō nisei, and as a result, the issue began trending on social media. Online petitions for protecting shūkyō nisei were launched. One petition pleads for freedom of religion for shūkyō nisei so they are not bound by their parents' spiritual beliefs. This petition garnered over 37000 signatures on 30 July 2022.

In October 2022, an outspoken shūkyō nisei victim under the pseudonym Sayuri Ogawa called for the disbandment of the UC at the press conference, but received messages from her parents via the church accusing her of being mentally unstable and demanding an end to the press conference. An online petition for dissolving the UC accumulated over 200 thousand signatures on 22 November 2022.

== Government responses ==
In October 2022, Prime Minister Fumio Kishida had ordered his ministers to launch a probe against the UC to decide if the government would request the court to issue an order of removing the UC of its religious corporation status. One focus of this probe was the allegedly illegal child adoption arrangement among the UC followers. The UC denied any organized arrangement. In December 2022, when the Ministry of Health, Labour and Welfare submitted a second inquiry about the child adoption practice, the UC refused to answer more than half of the questions, and sent a letter of protest for the ministry.

In December 2022, Japanese Ministry of Health, Labor, and Welfare considered drafting new guidelines which would define what kinds of actions constitute religious abuse against children to better help shūkyō nisei. These include intimidating an individual with language such as "[you will] be damned to hell" (地獄に落ちる) and coercing an individual into participating in any religious activity.

== In literature ==
- Under the Stars (星の子, lit. Child of the Stars) by Natsuko Imamura, a novel published in 2017 and adapted into a movie in 2020
- We Grew Up in a House Where 'God' Dwells (「神様」のいる家で育ちました), a manga by Mariko Kikuchi premiered in 2021
- Revolution+1, a fictional-biographical film based on Tetsuya Yamagami directed by Masao Adachi
- Sayuri Ogawa, Shūkyō Nisei (小川さゆり、宗教2世), an autobiography of Sayuri Ogawa

== In popular culture ==
The phrase shūkyō nisei entered the 2022 top 10 buzzword list in Japan.

== See also ==
- Religion in Japan
- Religion and children
- New religious movement
- Cult
- Religious abuse
