= Revolution+1 =

2022 Japanese film by Masao Adachi

- Film poster
- Directed by: Masao Adachi
- Screenplay by: Junichi Inoue; Masao Adachi
- Produced by: Umezou Katoh; Emiko Fujiwara
- Starring: Soran Tamoto; Satoko Iwasaki; Yusuke Takahashi; Futa Muraki; Ria Maesako
- Cinematography: Kenji Takama
- Edited by: Tomoko Hiruta
- Music by: Otomo Yoshihide
- Production company: Loft Project
- Release dates: September 26, 2022 (first cut); December 24, 2022 (final)
- Running time: 50 minutes (first cut); 75 minutes (final)
- Country: Japan
- Language: Japanese
- Budget: ¥7 million

Revolution+1 is a 2022 Japanese biographical experimental film directed by Masao Adachi. It is a semi-fictionalized account of the life of Tetsuya Yamagami, the main suspect in the assassination of former Japanese prime minister Shinzo Abe. The film was produced rapidly in the aftermath of Abe's assassination in July 2022: the first draft of the screenplay was written in three days, filming was completed in eight days, and an unfinished 50-minute cut of the film was screened on September 26, 2022, the day before Abe's state funeral. The final cut of Revolution+1 was released in Japan on December 24, 2022.

== Synopsis ==
Revolution+1 follows the life of Tatsuya Kawakami, a semi-fictionalized version of Tetsuya Yamagami, the suspected assassin of former Japanese prime minister Shinzo Abe. The film covers major events in Tatsuya's life, including the suicide of his father, his family's inability to pay for treatments for his brother's blindness, and his mother's membership in the Unification Church. After his mother's donations to the church leave the family in financial ruin, Kawakami is compelled to assassinate Abe for his ties to the organization.

== Cast ==
- Soran Tamoto as Tatsuya Kawakami
- Satoko Iwasaki as Tatsuya's mother
- Yusuke Takahashi as Tatsuya's father
- Futa Muraki as Tatsuya's brother
- Ria Maesako as Tatsuya's sister

== Production ==
Revolution+1 is directed by Masao Adachi, a former member of the Japanese Red Army who emerged as an experimental filmmaker in the 1960s. Adachi stated that he was inspired to make a film about the Abe assassination after learning that it was not an act of political terrorism, but rather that the alleged assassin "acted as an individual executioner who came to his own decision [...] rather than being directed by a political organization or social movement." He stated that he wished to make the film to "depict the background of one young man", and that he did not see the film as specifically sanctioning or condemning the assassination.

The screenplay was written by Junichi Inoue, who completed the first draft in roughly three days. Kenji Takama served as cinematographer, and the music was composed by Otomo Yoshihide, who completed the soundtrack in two hours. Tatsuya Kawakami is portrayed by actor Soran Tamoto; Inoue noted that it was difficult to find an actor affiliated with an agency willing to take the role, but that Tamoto was a freelancer and thus not bound by an agency. Tamoto stated that he decided to join the film because he felt he "had a role to play in having the world confront" the assassination.

Filming for Revolution+1 commenced in Tokyo in late August 2022, and concluded after eight days. Adachi stated that he "felt a sense of urgency" to produce the film, and that he wished to create and release it "before the media was able to distort the situation and propagate the shooter’s criminal profile or their version of his grounds for this incident". The film was produced on a budget of ¥7 million (US$63,781.32).

== Release ==
An unfinished 50-minute cut of Revolution+1 was screened at a dozen locations across Japan from September 26 to 29, 2022, coinciding with Abe's state funeral on September 27, 2022. Adachi stated that he chose to release the film on this date specifically in reaction to the decision by prime minister Fumio Kishida to give Abe a state funeral, describing it as a "fraudulent attempt to promote Abe as a 'great' politician, when he was a political criminal who degraded democracy". A screening at a theater in Kagoshima scheduled for September 29 was cancelled in response to protests.

The final 75-minute cut of Revolution+1 was released in Japan on December 24, 2022. The film had its United States premiere at e-flux Screening Room in Brooklyn, New York, on July 6, 2023.

== Reception ==
Eito Suzuki, an investigative journalist who covers the Unification Church, revealed in his book Who Was Tetsuya Yamagami that he informed Yamagami of the film's existence in correspondence he has maintained with him. While Suzuki praised the film's production efforts, he stated that he mentioned to Yamagami that he and his sister may find the artistic liberties taken by the film to be upsetting.
