= Islam and children =

Rights of children in Islam

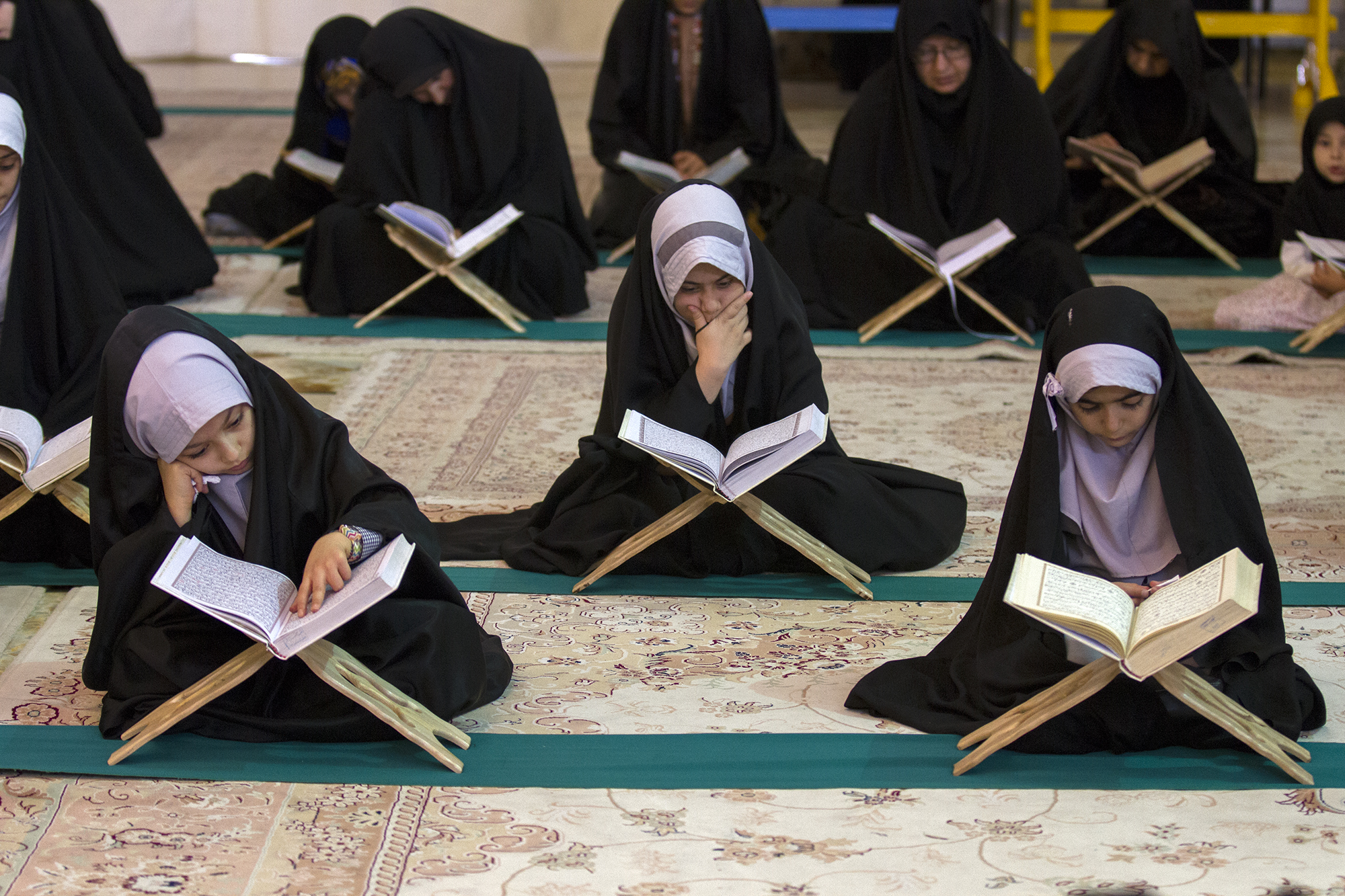
Shia Muslim girls studying the Quran placed atop folding lecterns (rehal) during Ramadan in Qom, Iran

The topic of Islam and children includes Islamic principles of child development, the rights of children in Islam, the duties of children towards their parents, and the rights of parents over their children, both biological and foster children.

Islam identifies three distinct stages of child development, each lasting 7 years, from age 0-21. Each comes with specific prescriptions for what a child is to learn and what their relationship with their parents should be.

Muslims have the right to a marriage arranged by their parents when they are old enough, though the Quran does not specify what age that is. Different traditions and countries have different views on readiness for marriage.

Fostering is strongly encouraged, but it is frowned upon to adopt a child and treat them as your own. Instead, they should maintain their own "natal identity."

== Muhammad's interactions with children ==
The Prophet Muhammad had seven children, three boys and four girls. All of his sons, including Ibrahim ibn Muhammad, died in infancy. Because of this, his experience as a father is sometimes described as "sorrowful". Muhammad also had an adopted son, Zayd, who is said to be the object of Muhammad's parental affection. He also had two grandsons, Hasan and Husayn, and three granddaughters, Umm Kulthum, Zaynab, and Umamah. In one Islamic tradition, Muhammad ran after Husayn in a game until he caught him. Muhammad used to let Umamah sit on his shoulders while he was praying. When someone expressed astonishment at the Prophet when the Prophet kissed his grandchild, he responded, "what can I do if God has deprived your heart of all human feeling?"

Muhammad has been described as being very fond of children in general. Watt attributes this to Muhammad's yearning for children, as most of his own children died before him. He comforted a child whose pet nightingale had died. Muhammad played many games with children, joked with them and befriended them. Muhammad also showed love to children of other religions. Once he visited his Jewish neighbor's son when the child was sick.

Once, Muhammad was sitting with a child in his lap, and the child urinated over Muhammad. Embarrassed, the father scolded the child. Muhammad restrained the father and advised him: "This is not a big issue. My clothes can be washed. But be careful with how you treat the child. What can restore his self-esteem after you have dealt with him in public like this?"

== Child development ==
In a hadith, Muhammad prescribed three stages of child development of seven years each; according to Muhammad:

- During the first seven years, a child should have the freedom to explore their curiosities, and to look at and experiment with things as they so choose, with little or no parental interference in such pursuits. Mothers are tasked with a larger role in this first stage of a child's life, being responsible for building and nurturing a healthy emotional connection with the child.
- In the second seven years, a child should be taught right from wrong, and even disciplined if necessary. This is also the time parents should instill habits of prayer and Quran study in the child. Fathers are instructed to take the lead in this stage of the child's life.
- During the third seven years, a child should have more of a friendly and collaborative relationship with the parents.

Adherents of Islam practice circumcision of children either as a cultural practice or a religious commandment. The Islamic term for the practice is khitan.

== Rights of children ==
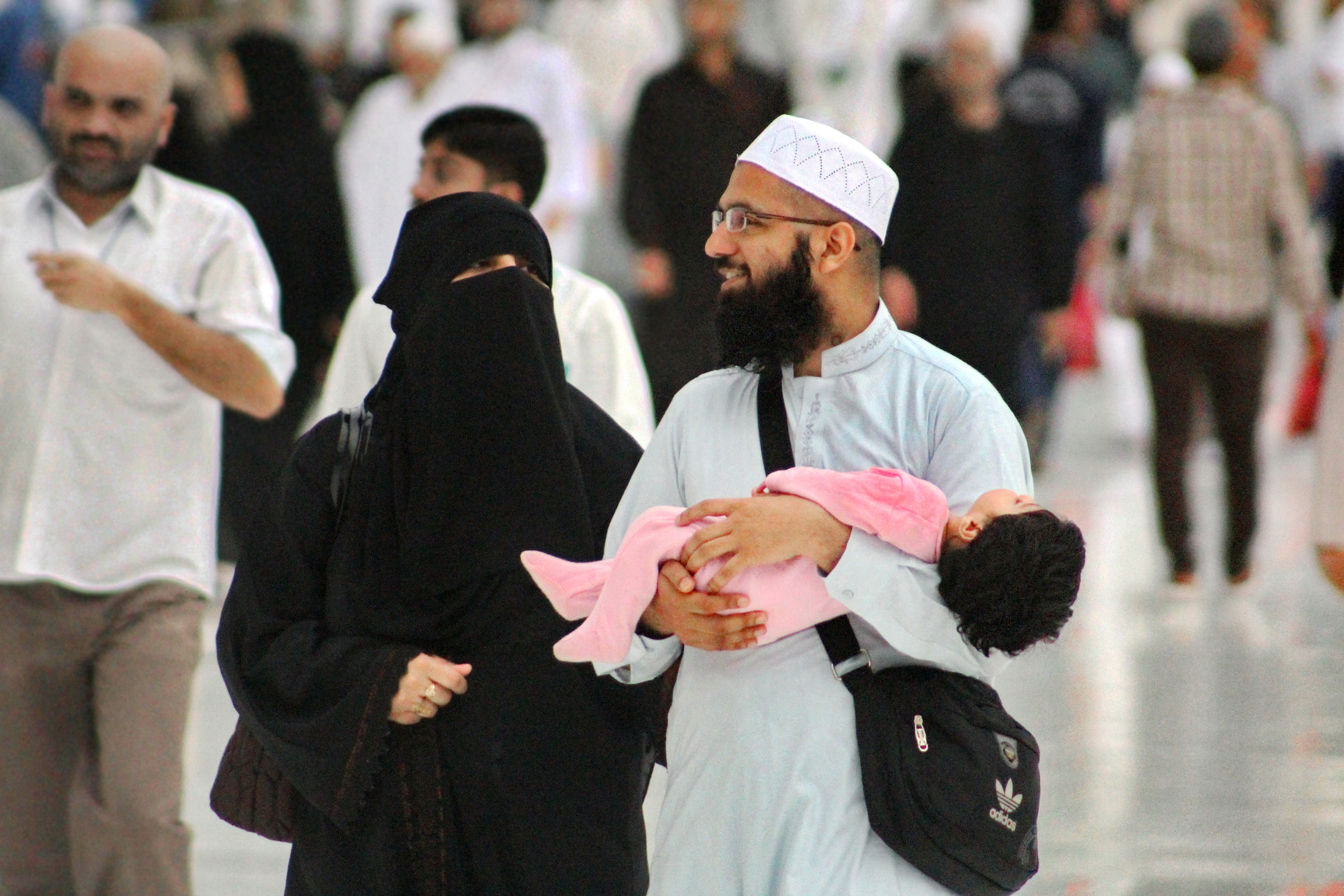
A Muslim couple and their toddler at Masjid al-Haram, Makkah, Saudi Arabia

Saadia Yacoob’s Beyond the Binary (2024) argues that the rights of children in Islam are universal, but are also based on biological lifecycle indicators such as age, gender, and puberty status, which can affect their legal rights and personhood.

According to Muhammad, children are entitled to legitimate heritage (being born from parents who are legally married) due to the role that familial heritage plays in their livelihood. In Islam, “lineage is considered to be the backbone and most fundamental organizing principle in and of Muslim society, arguably the knowledge of one’s lineage contributes towards the prevention of incestuous relationships unknowingly developing with a biological sibling.” Therefore, legitimate marriages are important for safeguarding the well-being of future children. According to Ibn Majah, the Prophet is quoted to have said, “Make a good choice for (your) spouse, for blood will tell.”

Children are entitled to be breastfed by their mothers (rada’at), so long as it does not harm the mother or cause the mother or father excessive suffering. (Surah al-Baqarah, 2:233). Furthermore, scholar Marion Katz argues that mothers may be socially exempt from breastfeeding based on their class and status, and may instead hire wet-nurses who can be compensated. Breastfeeding generally constitutes as the natural religious right of children within Islam, and is encouraged in the Quran as part of the maintenance and caring of the child.

Children are also entitled to be maintained and cared for by their fathers, extending beyond the breastfeeding period (Surah al-Baqarah, 2:233). According to Imam Muslim, the most rewarding path for fathers in terms of spending money is on their family and children; fathers who instead spend money over their own vanity, comfort, and for giving alms and charity at the expense and neglect of their children and families are considered to be financially neglectful. Fathers are also expected to provide academic and religious education for their children.

Children are entitled to the right to live and be protected from harsh punishment, death, and inequality. The pre-Islamic Arabian practice of infanticide, particularly female infanticide, is harshly condemned in the Quran (Surah An-Nahl, 16:58-59). The Prophet is also quoted to have said “Be fair, just and equal in treatment of your children,” when giving them gifts.

Sons and daughters may receive differing treatment by their parents, depending on various factors. Generally, fathers are responsible for taking care of their sons until they attain puberty, or until their daughters are married. Fathers are also expected to leave inheritances for their children. Sons are entitled to twice the amount of inheritance daughters receive, due to the obligation men have to care for their families and dependents (Surah An-Nisa, 4:11).

Children who are orphans are specifically entitled to wealth that was bestowed upon them. The guardians of orphans are required to safeguard the orphan’s wealth and belongings, and rightfully bestow it upon them when they are of age to receive it. Orphaned children also have the right to know their heritage; creating "fictive relationships" or falsifying biological relations to an orphan constitutes as "[denying] the child the right to know [their] biological parents and [their] choice to maintain a relationship with them."

== Marriage ==
=== Consent ===
According to Islamic practices, fathers and paternal guardians, such as grandfathers, may arrange the marriage of minor children with their consent; as the providers of their children, fathers are assumed to arrange marriages for the benefit and advancement of their child. Contemporary Islamic schools of thought generally view child marriages as illegal and forbidden. Sunni/Shia schools of thought agree that forced marriages are strictly forbidden in Islam, and the Hanafi school of thought recognizes that children who are compelled to be married can potentially be harmed by such an arrangement once they reach adulthood. As Islamic marriages are contracts between two consenting parties, children cannot arrange their own marriages, as they do not have the right of consent. Furthermore, Yacoob argues that children’s ability to consent and refuse can be misinterpreted by adults, complicating a child's ability to consent to an arranged marriage.

Muhammad gave people the power to annul their marriages if it was found that they had been married against their consent.

"When a man gives his daughter in marriage and she dislikes it, the marriage shall be annulled." Once a virgin girl came to the Prophet and said that her father had married her to a man against her wishes. The Prophet gave her the right to repudiate the marriage.

The Maliki school of thought gives the right of ijbar to the guardian. Ijbar is defined as the annulment of marriage due to objection by male guardian. According to Malik ibn Anas, children due to their immaturity may choose an unsuitable partner for themselves, hence, the power of ijbar has been given to the guardian so that he may overrule the child to marry someone he thinks is unsuitable for her. This is the legal right given to the guardian for girls by Maliki school of thought.

Yacoob argues that the legal practices of child marriage have strong gendered implications. Whereas male children reach legal adulthood and acquire the rights of a male adult, including financial responsibilities and the right of divorce, a female child who reaches legal adulthood could petition her husband to release her from the contracted marriage, but would require his consent for its permissibility. Furthermore, women must return any dower given to her at marriage, constituting a financial penalty for her request for divorce; had her legal guardian who arranged her marriage controlled/spent her dower, the woman would face difficulty in leaving her marriage. Yacoob also argues that the qualification for consummation of minor marriages differ between boys and girls.

=== Age of marriage ===
No age limits have been fixed by Islam for marriage according to Reuben Levy, and "quite young children may be legally married". The girl may not live with the husband however until she is fit for marital sexual relations. The Hanafi madhhab of Islamic fiqh maintains that a wife must not be taken to her husband's house until she reaches the condition of fitness for sexual relations. Levy adds:

"In case of a dispute on the matter between the husband and the bride's wali (her nearest male kinsman and her guardian), the judge (qadi) is to be informed and he is to appoint two matrons to examine the girl and report on her physical preparedness for marriage. If they decide she is too young, she must return to her father's house until she is judged fit. Betrothal may take place at any age. Actual marriage is later, but the age for it varies in different lands."

— Reuben Levy, The Social Structure of Islam

In Islamic legal terminology, baligh refers to a person who has reached maturity, puberty or adulthood and has full responsibility under Islamic law. Legal theorists assign different ages and criteria for reaching this state for both males and females. For women, baligh or balaghat in terms of sexual maturity is manifested by menses. However, only after a separate condition called rushd, or intellectual maturity to handle one's own property, is reached can a girl receive her bridewealth.

== Adoption and fostering ==
Islam highly recommends the "fostering" of children, defined as "assuming partial or complete responsibility of a child in lieu of the biological parents". However, Islam forbids naming the child as one's own or creating any "fictive relationships". Islamic adoption is sometimes called "fostering" or "partial adoption" and is similar to "open adoption". Traditionally Islam has viewed legal adoption as a source of potential problems, such as accidentally marrying one's sibling or when distributing inheritance.

Adoption was a common practice in pre-Islamic Arabia. According to this custom, the adopted son would take the name of his adoptive parent, and would be assimilated into the family in a "legal sense". Islam viewed this practice as "erasure of natal identity". This practice was sometimes done for emotional reasons, such as pity, but adoption was also a means through which slaves were stripped of their identities and given the name of their enslaver. The Quran replaced the pre-Islamic custom of adoption by the recommendation that "believers treat children of unknown origin as their brothers in the faith".

== See also ==
- Islam and humanity
- Child marriage
- Islamic views on slavery
- Women in Islam
- Religion and children
- Children of Muhammad
