= Eito Suzuki =

Japanese journalist

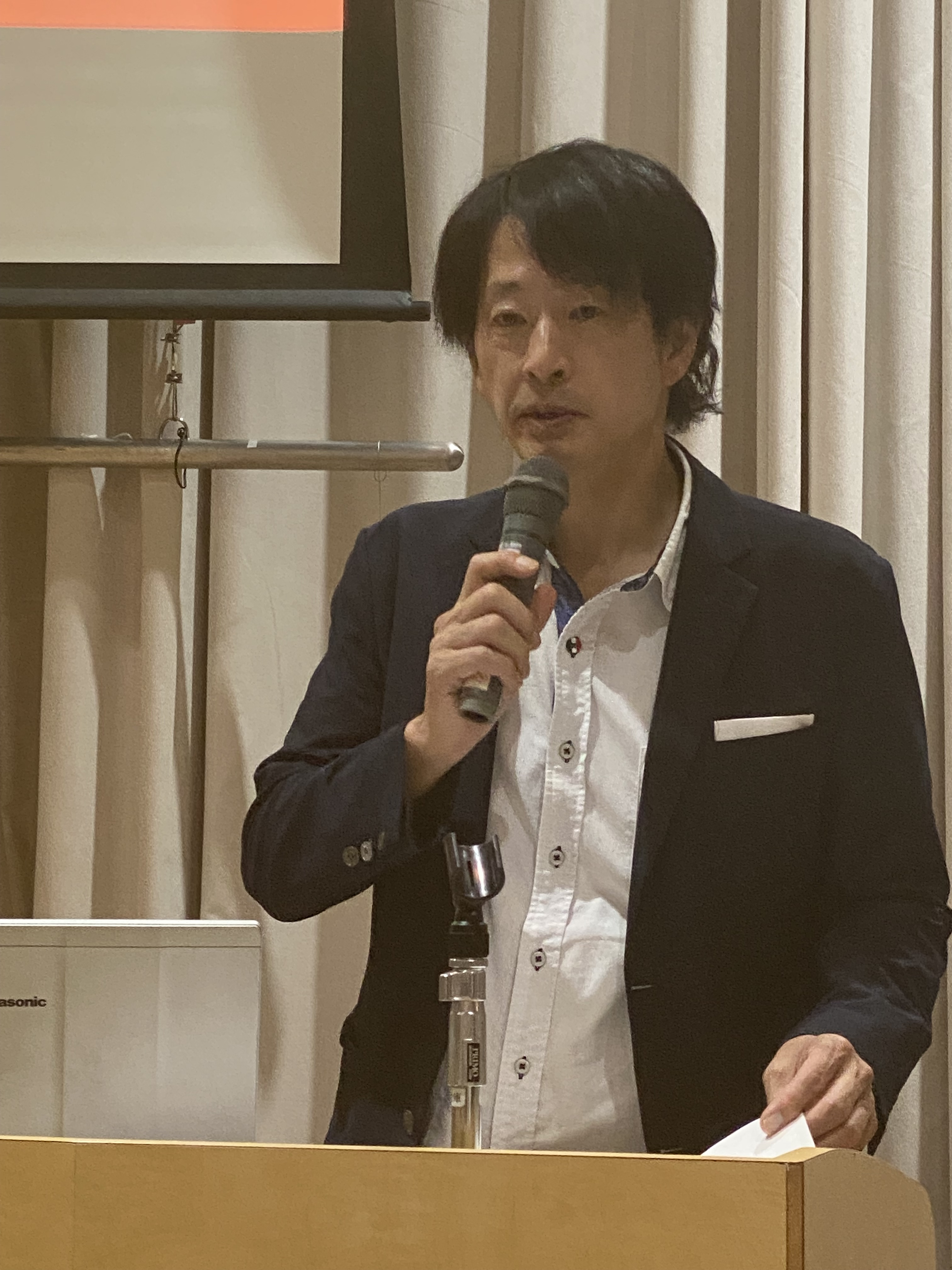
Eito Suzuki during a speech in Gamagōri (2023)

Eito Suzuki (Japanese: 鈴木 エイト, born 1968) is a pseudonymous Japanese investigative journalist who covers new religious movements in the country. His primary area of editorial coverage is fraudulent missionary activities and the relationship between religious organizations and major political parties, primarily the Unification Church (UC) and the Liberal Democratic Party (LDP).

== Background ==
=== Early life ===
Eito Suzuki was born in Shiga Prefecture, Kansai, and later moved to Tokyo to attend Nihon University College of Economics. Prior to his career as an investigative journalist, he worked in the real estate industry and at a children's center.

=== Career ===
Around 2002, Suzuki became aware of suspicious missionary activities conducted by the Unification Church (UC), where their true identity and intentions were not disclosed to their targets. This discovery inspired him to take action against the solicitation practices of the UC, leading him to infiltrate the UC facilities in Shinjuku and Shibuya, which were disguised as non-UC-affiliated entities. Seeking to address cult-related issues more comprehensively, he subsequently reached out to members of the National Network of Lawyers Against Spiritual Sales (Zenkoku Benren) and the Japan Society for Cult Prevention and Recovery. Through these connections, he embarked on a full-scale investigative journalism career.

Around 2009, Suzuki joined the news website "Almost Daily Cult News" (やや日刊カルト新聞) as a main editor. The website was founded by journalist Yoshirō Fujikura. Throughout his career, Suzuki has been subjected to stalking, intimidation, physical violence and civil lawsuit from followers of the UC. Leaflets featuring his photos and real name in the style of a wanted poster were distributed.

==== Assassination of Shinzo Abe ====
Since the assassination of the former Prime Minister Shinzo Abe on 8 July 2022, Suzuki has been making regular appearances as a guest commentator on various featured news programs across different broadcasting stations. He shares his latest investigations on the activities of the UC and their ties with the Liberal Democratic Party. In an interview of a documentary by CNA about Abe's assassination, Suzuki concluded that he wants that politicians become more transparent to the public about their dealings. On the other hand, Suzuki holds a pessimistic view regarding the Unification Church's ability to regulate itself against alleged controversial activities and believes that accountability by third-party monitors is necessary.

Suzuki has never met the main suspect Tetsuya Yamagami in person before or after Abe's assassination. It was revealed that Yamagami sent Suzuki two private messages on Twitter nine days before the assassination. However, Suzuki did not notice the messages before the assassination occurred. Yamagami's Twitter account was suspended not long after the assassination. Following Yamagami's arrest by the police, Suzuki has been able to communicate with him through letters delivered by Yamagami's lawyers. Through these exchanges, Suzuki has learned that Yamagami is a regular reader of his works. Particularly his report about Abe's video speech for a UC-affiliated event in September 2021 is cited as the main reason which incentivised Yamagami to target Abe, but Suzuki believes that Yamagami had a precise understanding of the relationship between the UC and Abe prior to that 2021 rally. Suzuki feels "the accuracy of my articles will be even more scrutinized" which could further compromise his personal safety. On the other hand, he insists that Yamagami should be given a fair trial, and society should work towards prevention of similar tragedy.

==== HPV vaccine drug damage lawsuit ====
He first became interested in the HPV vaccine after seeing members of the Unification Church protest against the HPV vaccine in a street chastity demonstration in 2010, and has been attending district courts since 2018 to cover the "HPV Vaccine Drug Harm Lawsuit." He posted the details of the direct examination (main examination and cross examination) of the three plaintiffs in the Tokyo District Court's Grand Bench held on August 7, 2024, as well as the press conferences held by the plaintiffs' attorneys and two pharmaceutical companies on X (formerly Twitter), and his observational report has been viewed 10 million times.

== Awards ==
In May 2023, Suzuki was awarded the special prize by the "Hizumi Fund for the Promotion of Information Distribution" for his coverage of the UC. In July 2023, Suzuki received an Honorable Mention of the "Freedom of the Press" award by the Foreign Correspondents' Club of Japan for the same reason. FCCJ praised him "almost alone among Japanese journalists - spent years investigating the church". In August 2023, he was awarded the second prize of the "Investigative Journalism Award 2023". In September 2023, he received the First Prize at the 66th Japan Congress of Journalists Awards for his authorship of the "Contamination of the Liberal Democratic Party" series.

== Books ==
=== Single authorship ===
- 自民党の統一教会汚染―追跡3000日 [Contamination of the Liberal Democratic Party by the Unification Church - Tracking for 3000 Days] (in Japanese). Shogakukan. 26 September 2022. ISBN 978-4093801232.
- 自民党の統一教会汚染2 山上徹也からの伝言 [Contamination of the Liberal Democratic Party by the Unification Church 2 - Messages from Tetsuya Yamagami] (in Japanese). Shogakukan. 26 May 2023. ISBN 978-4093801270.
- 「山上徹也」とは何者だったのか [Who was Tetsuya Yamagami] (in Japanese). Kodansha. 21 July 2023. ISBN 978-4065328729.

=== Joint authorship ===
- Hotaka Tsukada (塚田 穂高); Eito Suzuki (March 2017). 徹底検証 日本の右傾化 [Thorough Examination of Japan's Rightward Shift] (in Japanese). Chikuma Shobō. ISBN 978-4480016492.
- Shinichirō Tanaka (田中 信一郎); Eito Suzuki (December 2020). 日本を壊した安倍政権 [The Abe Administration that Broke Japan] (in Japanese). Fusosha Publishing. ISBN 978-4594086749.
- Bungeishunjū; Eito Suzuki (November 2022). 統一教会 何が問題なのか [Unification Church: What's the Problem?] (in Japanese). Bungeishunjū. ISBN 978-4166613946.
- Fumikazu Nishitani (西谷 文和); Akira Satō (佐藤 章); Tatsuru Uchida (内田 樹); Makoto Sataka (佐高 信); Kihei Maekawa (前川 喜平); Eito Suzuki (November 2022). 統一教会の闇 アベ政治の闇 まだ止められる大阪カジノ [The Darkness of the Unification Church: The Darkness of the Abe Administration, the Osaka Casino that can still be stopped] (in Japanese). Kikanshi Book. ISBN 978-4889002782.
- Chiki Agiue (荻上 チキ); Eito Suzuki (November 2022). 宗教2世 [Shūkyō nisei] (in Japanese). Ohta Publishing. ISBN 978-4778318338.
- Takeo Samaki (左巻 健男); Yoshirō Fujikura (藤倉 善郎); Eito Suzuki (December 2022). カルト・オカルト 忍びよるトンデモの正体 [Cults and the Occult: The True Nature of Sneaky Nonsense] (in Japanese). Akebi Shobō. ISBN 978-4871542241.
- Shigeru Ishiba; Satoshi Shirai (白井 聡); Tunehira Furuya (古谷 経衡); Moriko Hama (浜 矩子); Yukio Noguchi (野口 悠紀雄); Nobuhiro Suzuki (鈴木 宣弘); Toshikazu Inoue (井上 寿一); Shizuka Kamei (亀井 静香); Eito Suzuki (January 2023). 自民党という絶望 [The Despair Known as the Liberal Democratic Party] (in Japanese). Takarajimasha. ISBN 978-4299038500.
- Makoto Yokomichi (横道 誠); Eito Suzuki (February 2023). みんなの宗教2世問題 [The Problem of Shūkyō Nisei for Everyone] (in Japanese). Shōbunsha. ISBN 978-479497353-5.
