= Religious school =

School teaching religion

A religious school is a school that either has a religious component in its operations or its curriculum, or exists primarily for the purpose of teaching aspects of a particular religion.

== For children ==
A 2002 study in the United States found higher academic performance in children attending religious schools than those attending secular institutions, including when controlling for socioeconomic status.

This is reinforced in a 2013 study by William H. Jeynes. It also discusses some of the reasons for this significant boost in performance. Jeynes cites religious work ethic, how religious students are more likely to abstain from activities that are considered undisciplined and harmful to academic success, and the positive school culture that religious schools are able to develop.

A school can either be of two types, though the same word is used for both in some areas:

=== Religious teaching ===
Institutions solely or largely for teaching a particular religion, often outside regular school

- Catholic Biblical Association
- Cheder (Jewish)
- Confraternity of Christian Doctrine
- Hebrew school (Jewish)
- Madrasa (Muslim)
- Sunday school (Christian)
- Talmud Torah (Jewish)

=== General education ===
Institutions providing general education but run by a religious group, or in some way giving extra weight to a particular religion

- Bais Yaakov (Jewish girls school)
- Cathedral school (Christian)
- Catholic school
- Chabad (Jewish)
- Christian school
- Faith school UK term
- Jewish day school
- Lutheran school (Christian)
- Madrasa (Muslim) also general education in some places
- Parochial school USA in particular, former UK
- Separate school Canada

== For adults ==
- Bible college (Christian)
- Madrasa (Muslim)
- Yeshiva (Jewish)

== See also ==
- Bias in curricula
- Religion and children
- Religious education
- Religions
- Secular education
