= Religion and children =

Children often acquire religious views approximating those of their parents, although they may also be influenced by others they communicate with – such as peers and teachers. Matters relating the subject of children and religion may include rites of passage, education, and child psychology, as well as discussion of the moral issue of the religious education of children.

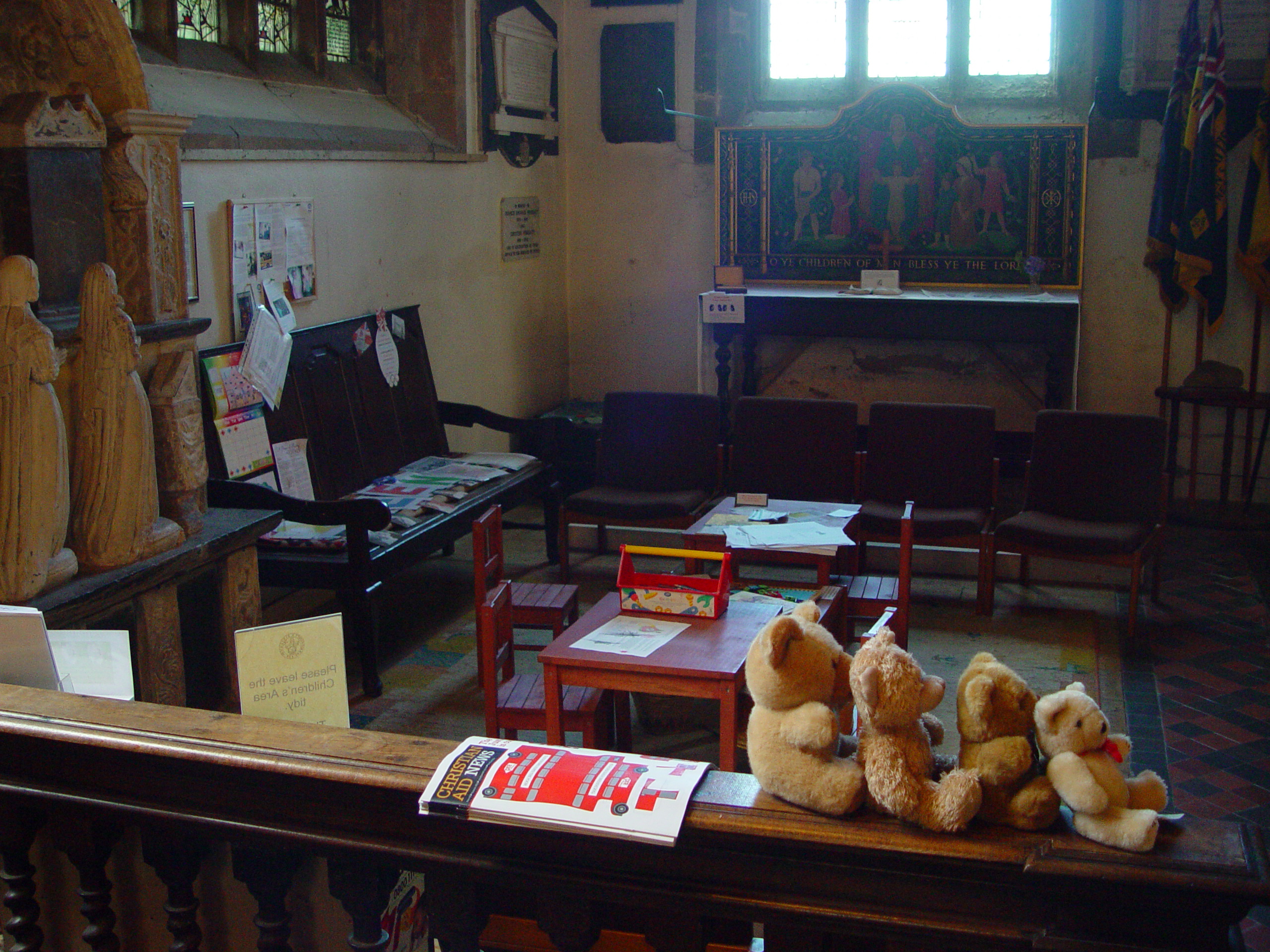
The Children and Parents area in the Priory Church of St Mary, Totnes, Devon, UK

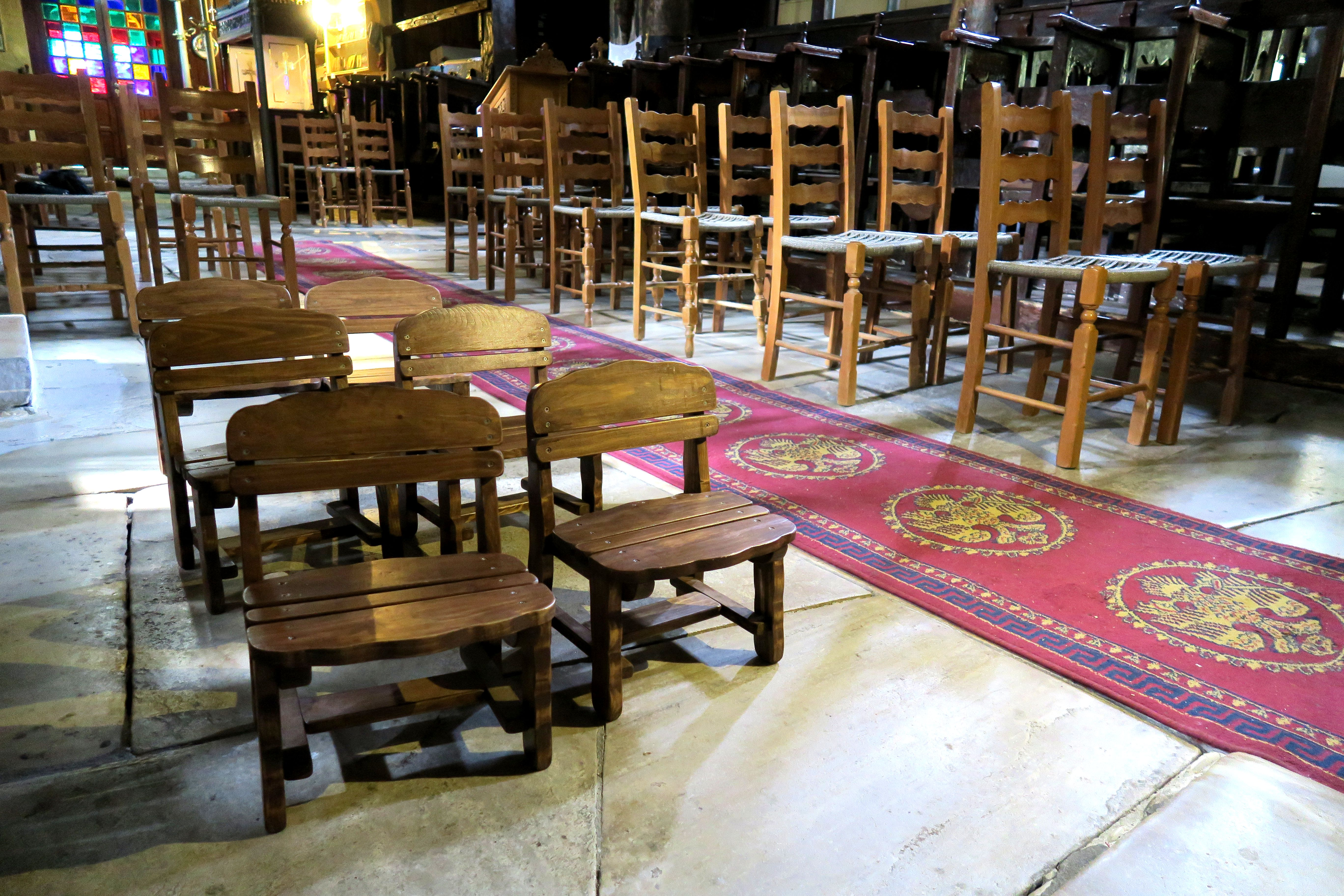
Chairs for children in the Church of Agia Marina in Kissos (Pelion, Greece)

== Rites of passage ==
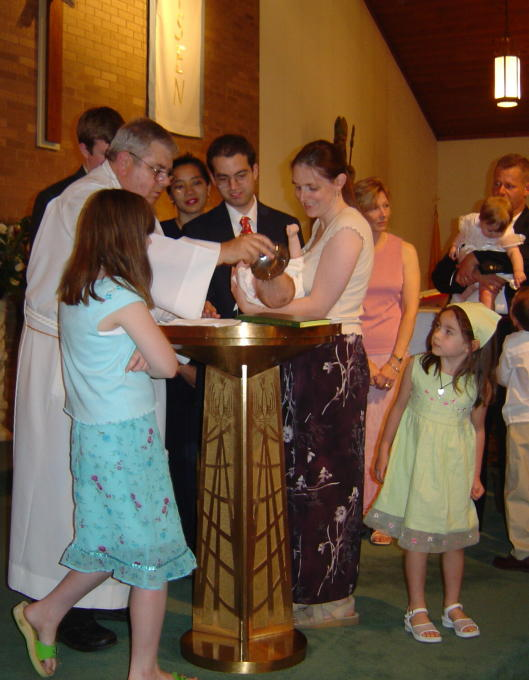
A Roman Catholic infant baptism in the United States

Most Christian denominations practice infant baptism to enter children into the faith. Some form of confirmation ritual occurs when the child has reached the age of reason and voluntarily accepts the religion.

Ritual circumcision is used to mark Jewish and Muslim and Coptic Christian and Ethiopian Orthodox Christian infant males as belonging to the faith. Jewish boys and girls then confirm their belonging at a coming of age ceremony known as the Bar and Bat Mitzvah respectively.

== Education ==
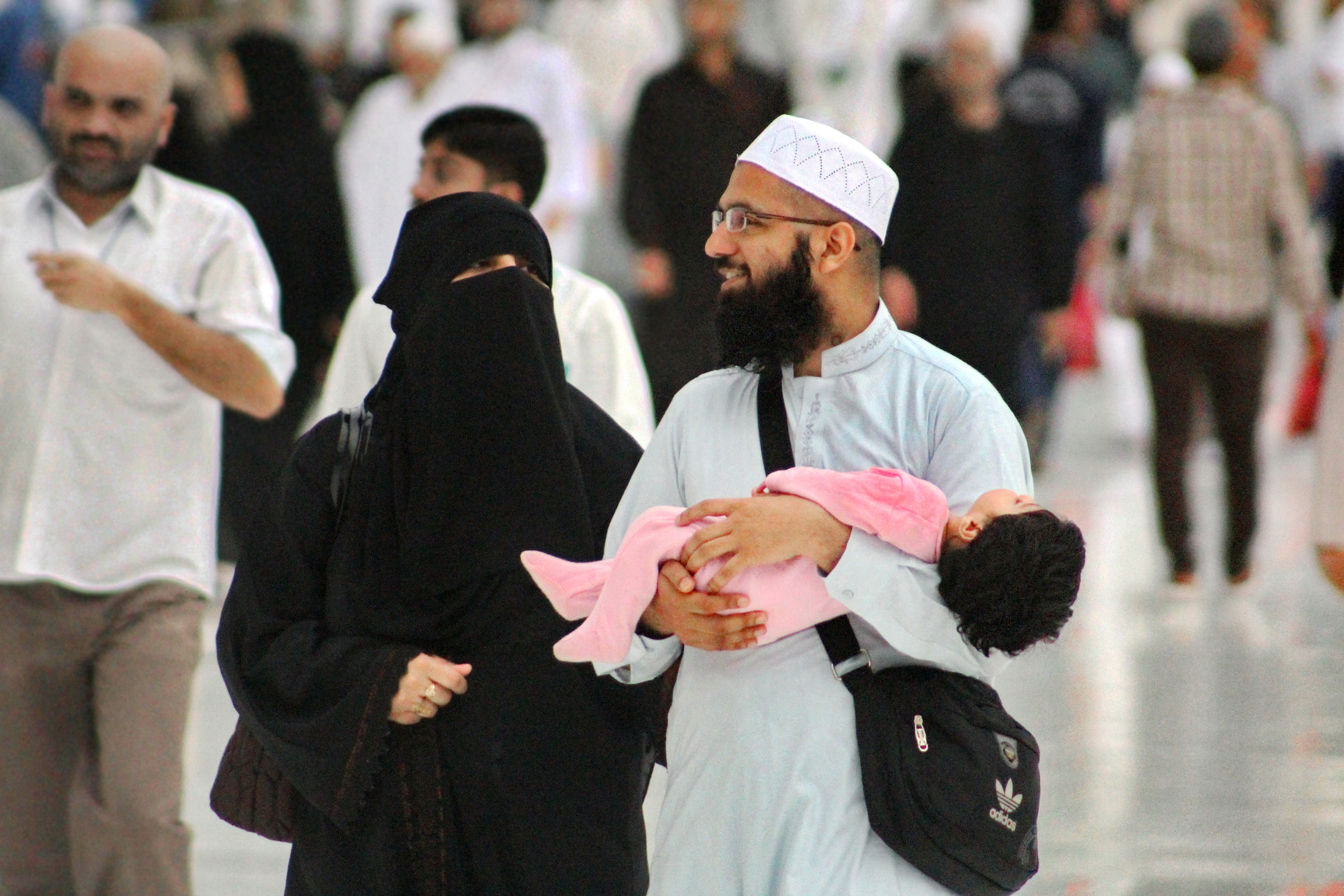
A young Muslim couple and their toddler at Masjid al-Haram, Makkah, Saudi Arabia

=== Religious education ===
A parochial school (US) or faith school (UK), is a type of school which engages in religious education in addition to conventional education. Parochial schools may be primary or secondary and may have state funding but varying amounts of control by a religious organization. In addition, there are religious schools which only teach the religion and subsidiary subjects (such as the language of the holy books), typically run on a part-time basis separate from normal schooling. Examples are the Christian Sunday schools and the Jewish Hebrew schools. Islamic religious schools are known in English by the Arabic loanword Madrasah.

=== Prayer in school ===
Religion may have an influence on what goes on in state schools. For example, in the UK the Education Act 1944 introduced the requirement for daily prayers in all state-funded schools, but later acts changed this requirement to a daily "collective act of worship", the School Standards and Framework Act 1998 being the most recent. This also requires such acts of worship to be "wholly or mainly of a broadly Christian character". The term "mainly" means that acts related to other faiths can be carried out providing the majority are Christian.

=== Teaching evolution ===
The creation–evolution controversy, especially the status of creation and evolution in public education, is a debate over teaching children the origin and evolution of life, mostly in conservative regions of the United States. However, evolution is accepted by the Catholic Church and is a part of the Catholic Catechism.

=== Display of religious symbols ===
In France, children are forbidden from wearing conspicuous religious symbols in public schools.

== Religious indoctrination of children ==
Many legal experts have argued that the government should create laws in the interests of the welfare of children, irrespective of the religion of their parents. Nicholas Humphrey has argued that children "have a human right not to have their minds crippled by exposure to other people's bad ideas," and should have the ability to question the religious views of their parents.

In "Parents' religion and children's welfare: debunking the doctrine of parents' rights", philosopher Arthur Schopenhauer spoke of the subject in the 19th century:

"And as the capacity for believing is strongest in childhood, special care is taken to make sure of this tender age. This has much more to do with the doctrines of belief taking root than threats and reports of miracles. If, in early childhood, certain fundamental views and doctrines are paraded with unusual solemnity, and an air of the greatest earnestness never before visible in anything else; if, at the same time, the possibility of a doubt about them be completely passed over, or touched upon only to indicate that doubt is the first step to eternal perdition, the resulting impression will be so deep that, as a rule, that is, in almost every case, doubt about them will be almost as impossible as doubt about one's own existence."

— Arthur Schopenhauer, On Religion: A Dialogue

Several authors have been critical of religious indoctrination of children, such as Nicholas Humphrey, Daniel Dennett and Richard Dawkins. Christopher Hitchens and Dawkins use the term child abuse to describe the harm that some religious upbringings inflict on children. A. C. Grayling has argued "we are all born atheists... and it takes a certain amount of work on the part of the adults in our community to persuade [children] differently."

Dawkins states that he is angered by the labels "Muslim child" or "Catholic child". He asks how a young child can be considered intellectually mature enough to have such independent views on the cosmos and humanity's place within it. By contrast, Dawkins states, no reasonable person would speak of a "Marxist child" (Note: However, consider the Jugendweihe ceremonies in eastern Germany) or a "Tory child." He suggests there is little controversy over such labeling because of the "weirdly privileged status of religion". Once, Dawkins stated that sexually abusing a child is "arguably less" damaging than "the long term psychological damage inflicted by bringing up a child Catholic in the first place". Dawkins later wrote that this was an off-the-cuff remark.

== Child marriage ==
Some scholars of Islam have permitted the child marriage of older men to girls as young as 10 years of age if they have entered puberty. The Seyaj Organization for the Protection of Children describes cases of a 10-year-old girl being married and raped in Yemen (Nujood Ali), a 13-year-old Yemeni girl dying of internal bleeding three days after marriage, and a 12-year-old girl dying in childbirth after marriage.

Latter Day Saint church founder Joseph Smith married girls as young as 13 and 14, and other Latter Day Saints married girls as young as 10. The Church of Jesus Christ of Latter-day Saints eliminated underaged marriages in the 19th century, but several fundamentalist branches of Mormonism continue the practice.

== Health effects ==
=== Medical care ===
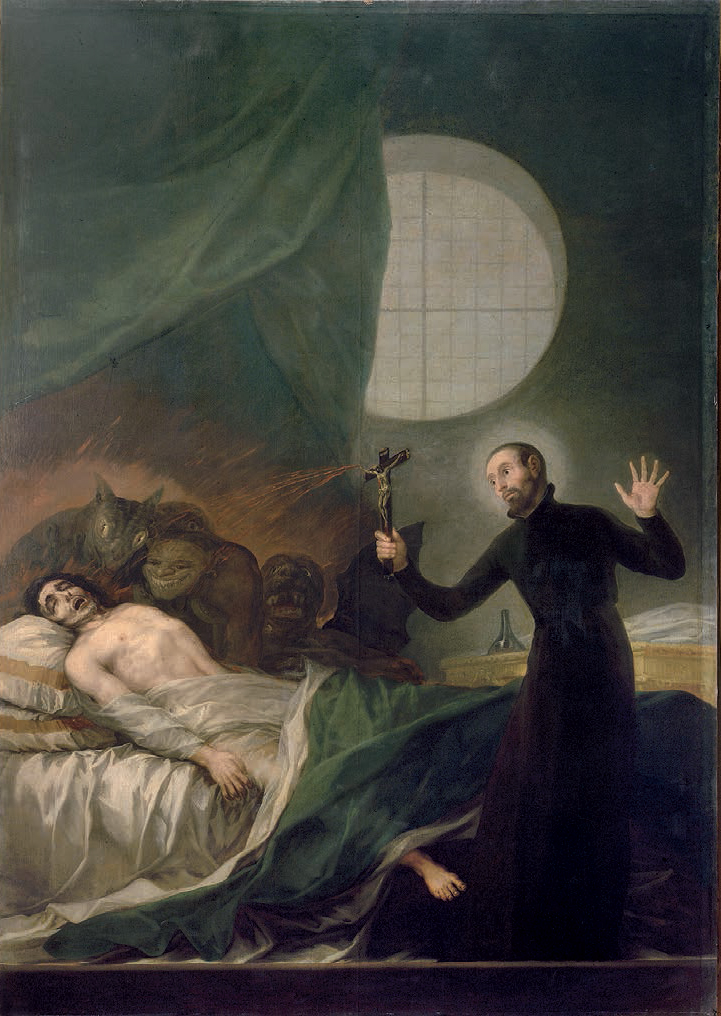
Saint Francis Borgia performing an exorcism, by Goya

Some religions treat illness, both mental and physical, in a manner that does not heal, and in some cases exacerbates the problem. Specific examples include faith healing of certain Christian sects, denominations which eschew medical care including vaccinations or blood transfusions, and exorcisms.

Faith based practices for healing purposes have come into direct conflict with both the medical profession and the law when victims of these practices are harmed, or in the most extreme cases, killed by these "cures." A detailed study in 1998 found 140 instances of deaths of children due to religion-based medical neglect. Most of these cases involved religious parents relying on prayer to cure the child's disease, and withholding medical care.

Jehovah's Witnesses object to blood transfusion primarily on religious grounds, they believe that blood is sacred and God said "abstain from blood" (Acts 15:28–29).

== Religion as a by-product of children's attributes ==
Dawkins proposes that religion is a by-product arising from other features of the human species that are adaptive. One such feature is the tendency of children to "believe, without question, whatever your grown-ups tell you" (Dawkins, 2006, p. 174).

Psychologist Paul Bloom sees religion as a by-product of children's instinctive tendency toward a dualistic view of the world, and a predisposition towards creationism. Deborah Kelemen has also written that children are naturally teleologists, assigning a purpose to everything they come across.

== Developmental psychology ==
Many have looked at stage models, like those of Jean Piaget and Lawrence Kohlberg, to explain how children develop ideas about God and religion in general.

== See also ==
- Children's rights
- Daugherty v. Vanguard
- Emmanuel Schools Foundation
- Freedom of religion
- Homeschooling
- Islam and children
- Lost boys (Mormon fundamentalism)
- Preacher's kid
- Religion and abortion
- Religious male circumcision
