= Daugherty v. Vanguard =

Church-state separation case

- Court: United States District Court for the Western District of Michigan
- Full case name: Megan Daugherty and Donald Sweeny, and Jeffrey A. Seaver and Catherine A. Seaver, and Michelle D. Kintz, individually, and as next friends of their minor children v. Vanguard Charter School Academy, a Michigan public school academy, and National Heritage Academies, a Michigan corporation
- Decided: September 25, 2000
- Citation: 116 F.Supp.2d 897 (W.D. Mich. 2000)

Court membership
- Judge sitting: Judge David McKeague

Keywords
- Establishment Clause

Daugherty v. Vanguard, 116 F.Supp.2d 897 (W.D. Mich. 2000) is one of a number of United States federal cases decided in the 2000s pertaining to the scope of allowable religious expression and/or activities in public schools. In the court's summary judgment issued in September 2000, U.S. District Court Judge David McKeague ruled that Vanguard Charter Academy and its corporate parent, National Heritage Academies, did not violate the Establishment Clause of the First Amendment to the U.S. Constitution through its Moral Focus Curriculum.

The case filed in the United States District Court for the Western District of Michigan-Southern Division derives its name from plaintiff Megan Daugherty and four other parents who alleged in 1998 that their children were subjected to "Christian influences" while the children attended Vanguard Charter School Academy in Wyoming, Michigan. Judge McKeague ruled that the allegations were unfounded and granted summary judgment to Vanguard and its parent corporation.

In the court's 36-page opinion, Judge McKeague found that the school maintained a "correct posture of neutrality" regarding religious activities during school. The court granted the school and National Heritage Academies summary judgment, finding that the defendants "presented no more than a scintilla of evidence to support a finding that any constitutionally impermissible conduct occurred." The ruling was not appealed by the defendants.

The court's opinion in Daugherty v. Vanguard is consistent with the U.S. Department of Education's "Guidelines on Constitutionally Protected Prayer in Public Elementary and Secondary Schools".
