= Firearm and Sword Possession Control Law =

The Firearm and Sword Possession Control Law (Japanese: 銃砲刀剣類所持等取締法, Hepburn: Jūhō Tōken-rui Shoji-tō Torishimari-hō) is a 1958 Japanese law concerning firearms (and firearm parts/ammunition) and bladed weapons. It was enacted in 1958 and revised a number of times, most recently in 2008.

== Background ==
Gun and sword control started in Japan as early as the late 16th century under Toyotomi Hideyoshi in order to disarm peasants and control uprisings. Since then, control on guns became increasingly strict for civilians, leading to a number of revisions and new laws during the Meiji Restoration. After World War II, the Japanese military was disarmed, which led to the Japanese government eventually enacting the Swords and Firearms Possession Control Law in 1958 to prevent gang fights involving guns and swords.

== Contents ==
The initial law was enacted in 1958 with the stated purpose of "safety regulations necessary for the prevention of harm related to the possession and use of firearms and swords". The regulations and prohibitions within largely concern the possession, use, import, discharge, conveyance, receipt, and sale of firearms and firearm parts, including regulations to follow in order to obtain permission to have a gun, but retains past restrictions on swords and other bladed weapons. Handguns are completely prohibited.

The law has been amended multiple times in response to various incidents involving guns. Major revisions include the addition of a ban on importation and raising the age to own a hunting rifle in 1965, and tighter restrictions on shotguns and the shortening of acceptable double-edged blades and daggers to 5.5 centimetres (2.2 in) in response to attacks in 2008.

== Effects on society ==
Due to the tight control of firearms, very few people in Japan own a gun. Additionally, gun-related crimes are extremely low; in the past 30 years, the year with the highest amount of gun-related deaths was 39 in 2001, and as low as 4 in 2009.

Japan as a whole is largely uninterested in firearms. The country's culture doesn't have a history of widespread gun ownership by citizens. Instead, historic influence have made weapons to be seen as "the mark of the rulers, not the ruled". The public's perception is that guns are inherently dangerous and need to be controlled.

Police stations have guns kept in locked cases, but police very rarely use them. Even during student riots involving Molotov cocktails, the police did not employ any guns. Graduating police officers most often choose judo and kendo over firearms training.

The effect on organized crime is that yakuza syndicates still employ Walther P38 and Tokarev pistols from the 20th century, mainly smuggled in from China, Russia and North Korea. The cheap cost of such antiquated guns (compared to the high cost of more modern guns on the black market), as well as the Yakuza's cultural preference for traditional Japanese swords, explain their continued reliance on the aforementioned handgun models.
