= Tetsuya Yamagami =

Assassin of Shinzo Abe (born 1980)

- 山上 徹也
- Yamagami cheerleading in his high school senior year (c. 1997–1998)
- Born: 10 September 1980 (age 46); Mie Prefecture, Honshu, Japan
- Known for: Assassination of Shinzo Abe
- Motive: Grudge toward the Unification Church over his family's financial ruin caused by his mother's donations, which Abe had ties to
- Criminal charges: Murder; violation of the Weapons Manufacturing Act (gun manufacture without a license); violation of the Explosives Control Act and the Firearms and Knives/Swords Act (gunpowder manufacturing); property damage
- Penalty: Life imprisonment
- Capture status: Arrested and admitted to murder of Abe (2022), psychiatric assessment completed (2023), indictment issued (2023), first-instance trial (2025), convicted and appealing with a higher court (2026)

Details
- Killed: 1 (Shinzo Abe)
- Imprisoned at: Osaka Detention House
- Military career
- Branch: Japan Maritime Self-Defense Force
- Service years: 2002–2005
- Rank: Leading seaman (Kaishichō)

Tetsuya Yamagami (Japanese: 山上 徹也, Hepburn: Yamagami Tetsuya; born 10 September 1980) is a Japanese Navy veteran and murderer who assassinated Shinzo Abe, the former prime minister of Japan, on 8 July 2022, in Nara. A resident of Nara, he was arrested at the scene of the assassination. At the time of his arrest, he was 41 years old, had no prior criminal history, and was unemployed. His criminal trial began in Nara on 28 October 2025. Yamagami was sentenced to life imprisonment on 21 January 2026.

== Personal life ==
Yamagami was born on 10 September 1980 in Mie Prefecture to affluent parents who ran a local construction business. Yamagami's family moved to Higashiosaka. Described as quiet and reserved in high school, he nonetheless joined the cheerleading team, which he described as a "manly" endeavor to a friend.

He wrote in his graduation yearbook that he "didn't have a clue" what he wanted to do in the future. Yamagami had been struggling since childhood with the Unification Church (UC), of which his mother had become a member since 1991. After the death of his maternal grandfather, his mother inherited ownership of the family properties and family business. She had donated more than 100 million yen to the UC and declared bankruptcy in 2002 when Yamagami was 21 years old.

Yamagami graduated from Nara Prefectural Koriyama Senior High School in 1998, with plans of becoming a firefighter, but was unable to pass a required test due to his near-sightedness. Yamagami did not attend university due to his mother's insistence on earning money for donations to the Unification Church that she believed were necessary to achieve salvation for his ill and suicidal older brother. Instead, Yamagami attended a vocational school with financial support from his uncle Tōichirō, a since-retired lawyer.

== Relatives ==
=== Father and older brother ===
Yamagami's father graduated from Kyoto University's faculty of engineering in 1970. He died of suicide by jumping in 1984 when Yamagami was four years old. While testifying in court, Yamagami's mother stated that he suffered alcoholic addiction and depression due to work-related issues. Yamagami's older brother, who was about one year older than him and had a longtime struggle with lymphoma which led to him losing eyesight in one eye, was not able to afford medical treatment; he died of suicide in 2015. This greatly impacted Yamagami, according to his uncle. Yamagami's defense team revealed in court that he made a determination to live his life at least until his brother died.

=== Mother ===
Yamagami's mother and younger sister initially declined media interviews. At the time of Abe's assassination, they were approximately 70 and 37 years old, respectively. Several family losses had preceded the incident: Yamagami's maternal grandmother died in 1982, and his mother's younger brother later died in a traffic accident, events that reportedly had a significant emotional impact on Yamagami's mother. In her testimony during the first-instance trial of her younger son, Yamagami's mother stated that before her husband's death, for finding solace to distract herself from her husband's alcoholic addiction, she had already been involved in religious activities and making donations for 500 thousand yen. The monetary offering was opposed by her husband and other family members which frustrated her.

Yamagami's mother joined the UC in August 1991 after being approached by a church follower. After explaining her husband's suicide and her eldest son's serious illness, she was advised that making monetary donations would contribute to the "salvation" of her family. She made an initial donation of 20 million yen, funded by her late husband's life insurance, and contributed an additional 30 million yen the following year. She further donated about 10 million yen for what she was told would ensure her late husband's peaceful afterlife. Following the death of her own father, she sold the family home for roughly 40 million yen and donated the proceeds to the UC around 1996. In 1998, when Yamagami (her second) was 18 and considering university, she believed that making further donations was a higher priority, as her eldest son was exhibiting suicidal behavior. She declared bankruptcy in 2002 when Yamagami was 21, but continued making smaller donations to the UC thereafter. She went to South Korea over 30 times to participate in UC events.

A selection of text messages Yamagami sent to his mother in 2012 while she traveled to South Korea (home of the UC headquarters) were disclosed in court. The messages indicated a strong resentment towards her, with Yamagami writing "It is absurd that you pretend to be a normal parent", "Maybe I should kill you and take the insurance money", and "I will disgrace you and make you regret it." After Abe's assassination in 2022, she stayed for about a month at the home of Yamagami's paternal uncle before moving alone to Osaka with assistance from the UC. She has remained a member of the UC and has expressed apologies to both Abe's widow, Akie Abe, and the church regarding her son's alleged crimes. Since his arrest, Yamagami has refused all contact with his mother, declining her requests for visitation at the detention facility, while continuing to read and acknowledge letters from supporters.

Shortly before Yamagami's first-instance trial in October 2025, his mother gave an in-depth interview to the Japan News Network, in which she stated that her faith in the UC and its teachings has only grown stronger since the assassination, while acknowledging that she had made excessive donations in the past. However, she rejected the view that her donations were the reason her son shot Abe, instead attributing the incident to the "[lack of] familial love". She blamed herself over the assassination and said, "If I had not been a mother, things would not have turned out like this." On November 13, she was called by Yamagami's defense team as a witness, where she apologized over his actions. Her physical appearance was concealed in court.

=== Paternal uncle ===
Yamagami's paternal uncle, Tōichirō Yamagami (山上 東一郎, Yamagami Tōichirō), is the older brother of Yamagami's father, and has provided many accounts about Yamagami's family. Tōichirō was 77 years old when Abe was assassinated. Originally working in the construction contractor industry, he obtained an attorney's licence and started his own legal consulting firm in Osaka. Despite being a lawyer himself, he appointed a team of defense attorneys to represent Yamagami during his criminal proceedings. After Yamagami's father's death by suicide in 1984, he had been providing financial aid to Yamagami's family for about 20 million yen, up until 2020 when Japan was hit by the COVID-19 pandemic. Yamagami's mother often asked him for money to donate to the UC while neglecting her children, to the point that he once threw a cup of tea on her and drove her away in a fit of rage.

== Japan Maritime Self-Defense Force ==
Yamagami joined the Japan Maritime Self-Defense Force (JMSDF) in August 2002; he was posted to Kure Naval Base and assigned to the destroyer JDS Matsuyuki. In February 2005, while in the military, Yamagami attempted suicide in hope of his siblings receiving his life insurance payout after learning that his mother neglected his brother to attend Unification Church events in South Korea. In an investigation report written by the JMSDF, Yamagami stated that his "life had been ruined by the Unification Church", and that his "brother and sister are in need", wanting to "help them by giving them my life insurance". He moved to the General Affairs Department at the JMSDF 1st Service School in Etajima. He was discharged from the JMSDF in August 2005 as a quartermaster with the rank of leading seaman.

== Career after the navy ==
After the JMSDF, Yamagami worked for at least 10 different companies for 17 years until the assassination. In December 2006, he worked in a surveying company as a part-timer, and quit in June 2007. He remained unemployed for 2 years and, during that period, he obtained the licences of assistant surveyor and real estate notary. Since then he mostly took short-term part-time jobs or dispatched labour and quit swiftly for personal reasons, usually after about half a year of employment. The longest job he remained at lasted about one and a half years. In October 2020, Yamagami started working as a forklift operator in Kyoto Prefecture for a manufacturer that operated in the Kansai region. There, he was described as quiet. He quit in May 2022 after claiming that he was "feeling unwell". After that, Yamagami briefly worked under another temporary staffing firm in Osaka Prefecture until he resigned in early June 2022.

== Assassination of Shinzo Abe ==
On 8 July 2022, Yamagami appeared at the northern exit of Yamato-Saidaiji Station, Nara at 11:30 am, where Shinzo Abe was delivering a campaign speech for Kei Satō, a Liberal Democratic Party candidate in the upcoming Upper House election. Abe was positioned inside a traffic island of the crossroad, facing away from the train station. Yamagami was behind Abe with a street separating them. Yamagami slowly approached Abe, unnoticed by Abe's bodyguards. Yamagami then discharged a homemade shotgun, seemingly not hitting anyone. Upon hearing the noise, Abe turned his head to look behind him. Yamagami took a few steps forward and fired a second round. Abe immediately displayed signs of severe pain and collapsed to the ground. Abe's bodyguards rushed towards Yamagami and restrained him on the ground.

=== Criminal proceedings ===
Yamagami was arrested at the scene of the assassination on suspicion of attempted murder by the Nara Prefectural Police; the charge was upgraded to murder after Abe was pronounced dead. Yamagami was transferred to the Nara Nishi Police Station upon his arrest. He was described as being calm and having made no attempts to flee. Before any formal charges were brought against Yamagami, he was held at the Osaka Detention House and had been psychiatrically evaluated to determine if he was mentally competent to be indicted. The evaluation was initially set to end on 29 November, but was extended by a request from prosecutors to 6 February 2023. After an appeal by lawyers for Yamagami, the extension was reduced and set to end on 10 January.

On 24 December 2022, the Nara District Prosecutor's Office determined that Yamagami was competent enough to stand trial on the murder charge, based on factors including the capability of making the firearm allegedly used in the assassination. On 10 January 2023, Yamagami was transferred back to Nara Nishi Police Station to continue his detainment. An additional charge against Yamagami of violating the Firearm and Sword Possession Control Law was added by the Prosecutor's Office. Three days later, Yamagami was formally charged with Abe's murder.

On 30 March 2023, the prosecutor's office added two more criminal charges, namely violations of Weapon Manufacturing Law and property damage, bringing the total charges against Yamagami to four. The charge related to the Public Election Law was dismissed because the prosecutors determined that there was insufficient evidence to support the allegation. On 28 October 2025, the trial against Yamagami began in Nara. Yamagami admitted to killing Abe during the first hearing, and his lawyer asked for any punishment to be automatically reduced because Yamagami's handmade gun did not fall under the criteria of the Firearms and Swords Control Act. On 21 January 2026, Yamagami was sentenced to life imprisonment.

==== Psychiatric evaluation ====
While psychiatric assessment of a criminal suspect in Japan usually takes about three months, Yamagami's nearly half-year-long assessment is considered unusual. A News Post Seven journalist speculated that the prosecutors were waiting for public sentiment over the assassination to quiet down, due to the aftermath brought by the incident as well as sympathy and admiration towards Yamagami.

=== Sentencing guidelines ===
Regarding the possible sentence should Yamagami be convicted of murder, Japanese media cited a similar case in 2007, in which former gang leader Tetsuya Shiroo was convicted of murdering Iccho Itoh during the latter's campaign for re-election as the mayor of Nagasaki City. Shiroo was sentenced to death during the first trial in Nagasaki District Court on the grounds of "strong antisocial behavior which denies the foundation of democracy". This was overturned and reduced to life imprisonment in a second trial in Fukuoka High Court and Supreme Court, as the judges preferred to be cautious of seeking capital punishment for a murder conviction which involved a single fatality.

=== Motive ===
Yamagami told investigators that his motive had been personal rather than political. After his mother joined the Unification Church in August 1991, she had given the church about 100 million yen (US$720,000), a parcel of land she had inherited from her father, and the house where she lived with her three children; she subsequently declared bankruptcy in 2002. She had continued donating to the church following the bankruptcy. Yamagami's uncle recalled being contacted by Yamagami and his siblings to complain that they had no food at home, and that electricity and rent payments were often overdue, prompting the uncle to deliver meals and money for living expenses.

Yamagami blamed the Unification Church for his family's financial problems and held a grudge against the religious group. Researching the church's connections to Abe in the months before the attack, he believed the former prime minister Abe and his maternal grandfather, former prime minister Nobusuke Kishi, had an involvement in spreading the church's influence in Japan. In a letter sent to journalist Kazuhiro Yonemoto on 7 July, the day before the incident, Yamagami introduced himself as "Mada Tari-nai" (まだ足りない, lit. 'still not enough'), a regular commenter under that handle on Yonemoto's blog posts, and stressed that he "had spent [much time] trying to obtain guns".

Yonemoto is the editor of a blog reporting on problems experienced by the children of religious cult believers. The letter was sent from Okayama and did not mention the name of the sender, but a "statement of mutual agreement" between Yamagami's family and the Unification Church was enclosed. The agreement arranged the return of 50 million yen by the Unification Church. Yamagami's name and address was handwritten on the agreement.

In the letter, Yamagami wrote that his "connection with the Unification Church dates back about 30 years". He expressed a desire to kill the entire Moon family, but noted that it was unrealistic. He also noted that killing Hak Ja Han, the leader of the Unification Church, or her daughter, would not achieve his goal of getting the Unification Church dissolved. He also wrote that Shinzo Abe was "not my enemy, originally, although I have had negative opinions about him. Abe was just one of the Unification Church's sympathizers who wields the most influence in the real world." Yonemoto found the letter in his home mailbox on 13 July, five days after the assassination. A draft copy of the letter was found on Yamagami's computer.

Yonemoto, who never had met Yamagami before, said: "I think he probably had no one to talk to and wanted to express his feelings to someone. He may have thought I was his friend because I operate the blog he posted on. I understand the suffering of believers' children. But I wish he had consulted with me directly before going that far." Yonemoto initially refused to hand the letter over to police, and it was later seized. Yamagami stated that his Twitter account was @333_hill, a reference to the video game franchise Silent Hill, in his letter to Yonemoto. The account was made in October 2019, with Hak Ja Han scheduled to visit Aichi Prefecture the same month.

Yamagami posted on Twitter that he was "willing to die to liberate every person involved in the Unification Church", and that he had "no concern about what will happen to the Abe administration as a result". Yamagami's Twitter account was suspended from 19 July due to an unspecified violation of Twitter's company policies. Another Twitter account belonging to Yamagami was suspended in 2019 for violating Twitter's policies on "abusive language, threatening, or discriminatory language or behavior".

In May 2023, it was revealed that Yamagami also sent two private messages on Twitter to the anti-cult journalist Eito Suzuki nine days before the assassination. The messages went unnoticed by Suzuki before Yamagami's account was suspended, but the two men were able to re-establish communication using letters delivered by Yamagami's lawyers. Yamagami claimed that the messages were about him being a regular reader of Suzuki's writing, and a question about an important figure from the UC who would attend a 10 July 2022 ceremony held in Urawa-ku, Saitama. Suzuki deduced that that person was the then second-in-command of the UC, Yun Young-ho (Korean: 윤영호; Hanja: 尹煐鎬).

=== Planning ===
Yamagami said that his initial plan was to assassinate a high-ranking official of the Unification Church, but later decided to target Abe instead. From around the time his mother went bankrupt, Yamagami wandered around the Unification Church building carrying a knife, looking for an opportunity to kill Hak Ja Han. He planned to kill Han with a Molotov cocktail when she visited Aichi Prefecture in 2019, but gave up because he could not enter the church building. Yamagami told investigators that he initially considered making a bomb and purchased a pressure cooker to create a bomb, but eventually decided to change his plan after realising it could maim or kill innocent bystanders when it exploded. Instead, he made guns that he "could easily fix on a target".

Yamagami allegedly decided to change his target to Abe after learning of his video speech to an event held by the Unification Church's front organisation in September 2021 in which Abe praised Hak Ja Han, the leader of the church. He proceeded to stalk the former prime minister at various locations as he planned his attack over a period of several months. On the day before the assassination, Yamagami travelled by Shinkansen and attended an LDP rally in Okayama Prefecture with the intent of killing Abe there; he was forced to backtrack due to entry protocols. After Abe's schedule was changed to allow him to visit Nara City on 8 July, Yamagami kept track of his movements via Abe's website.

Yamagami's residence was a five-minute walk from Shin-Ōmiya Station; the westbound next stop on the Kintetsu Nara line is Yamato-Saidaiji Station, where the assassination was carried out.

=== Weapon preparations ===
Yamagami allegedly built the weapon used in the shooting. Yamagami started buying materials needed to make guns and gunpowder in spring 2021, learning how to make guns and bombs from watching YouTube videos. Websites about bomb-making and weapons manufacturing were discovered in Yamagami's browsing history.

Making homemade weapons was a costly endeavour for Yamagami, who ran out of funds very soon, could not hold down a steady job, and was several hundreds of thousands of yen in debt, which pushed him to proceed with assassinating Abe in July 2022; he was 600,000 yen in debt, with 200,000 yen in his savings account, after having resigned in June 2022. His one-room apartment's rent was 30,000 yen per month. To dry his homemade gunpowder, Yamagami rented an apartment between March and September 2021. He later rented a garage in Nara from November 2021 to February 2022 for the same purpose, costing him 15,000 yen per month.

Yamagami stated that he tested his improvised firearms by firing them at multiple wooden boards with an aluminium-covered tray for storing dry gunpowder that he produced from fertiliser, which were later recovered from his vehicle. Yamagami also claimed that he tested his firearms in the mountains in Nara Prefecture. Yamagami told police that he had test-fired his homemade gun in a facility linked to the Unification Church on 7 July, the day he went to Okayama to attend Abe's election campaign and assassinate him, later giving up the plan. Six bullet holes were discovered by investigators at the entrance of a building next to the Nara branch of the Unification Church. The gun used in the shooting was fired by a battery igniting the gunpowder with an electric current.

Police discovered seven homemade firearms similar to that weapon, two of them unfinished, as well as possible explosive devices, during a search of his home following his arrest. They were later seized as evidence by bomb disposal officers after nearby residents were evacuated. Plastic-based shotgun shells were also seized by police.

== Reactions ==
Yamagami is described by some commentators who wrote for The Economist and The Atlantic as one of the most effective political assassins in recent history. The assassination brought the many social issues with the Unification Church under the spotlight again, and precipitated a plunge in the approval of the ruling party. Under the public pressure, the responsible ministry decided to file a dissolution order against the UC with the Tokyo District Court on 13 October 2023, after nearly a year of investigation of misconduct. On 25 March 2025, the district court upheld the dissolution order, although the church considered the option to appeal the ruling.

The Japanese media reported that the difficult circumstances endured by Yamagami and his siblings were very similar to the "shūkyō nisei", otherwise known as the "religious second generations", a Japanese term categorising children being raised by parents who are enthusiastic with their religious practices while neglecting or abusing their children. Abe's assassination brought the shūkyō nisei issue under the spotlight in Japan's mainstream media, and more shūkyō nisei victims began to speak out about their hardships and inaction from the government. During his detention, Yamagami has been permitted to read newspapers. He expressed a strong interest in learning about various societal issues and stated that he did not anticipate his actions would have such significant consequences. He also could not conclude if the situation "is good or bad for other [shūkyō] niseis."

=== Idolisation ===
Since Yamagami's apprehension, he has been sympathised with and hailed as an icon domestically and abroad. T-shirts printed with Yamagami's photograph during Abe's assassination were being sold on Chinese online marketplaces and were worn by some Chinese people in public events. This is believed to be because of Abe's historical negationism by denying the Japanese war crimes committed in China, paying tributes to war criminals commemorated in Yasukuni Shrine, as well as making pro-Taiwan statements.

In Japan, Yamagami's family has been receiving a considerable amount of gift money, (Note: According to Yamagami's uncle, over ¥1 million (US$6,316.48) yen in gift money had been sent from all over Japan by October 2022.) as well as presents like food, clothes, and books via online gifting websites from his supporters, according to his uncle. When Yamagami's Twitter account noted in his letter for Yonemoto was leaked to the public on 17 July 2022, his Twitter followers surged from zero to over 45,000 within one day. His Twitter account received an increase in likes and retweets, until the account was suspended on 19 July. On 10 September 2022, during Yamagami's 42nd birthday, he received messages of celebration and admiration on social media with the hashtag "Tetsuya Yamagami birthday". Japanese people cosplaying Yamagami's appearance during Abe's assassination were spotted at events like the rally against Abe's state funeral. These cosplayers held cardboard signs displaying the leaders they were against: Abe, Ali Khamenei, Vladimir Putin and Xi Jinping. Even before Yamagami was being officially tried, online petition website Change.org had received over 8,700 signatures, as of 8 October 2022, which pleaded for reducing Yamagami's sentence. The sponsors of the petition denied the accusation from opponents that they approved of murder, but sympathised with Yamagami because his suffering as a shūkyō nisei was not an isolated case. They also saw that Yamagami was working hard to rehabilitate himself, so thought that society should give him one more chance instead of sentencing him to death.

The preview version of Revolution+1, a fictional-biographical film, (Note: The protagonist of the film is named "Tatsuya Kawakami" (川上 達也) instead of "Tetsuya Yamagami" (山上 徹也).) which is based on the reports about Yamagami directed by Masao Adachi and was premiered in small theatres across Japan on Abe's state funeral. Some theatres cancelled the screening after receiving public complaints, citing reasons such as "disrespect of the deceased" and "justification of terrorism". In a December 2022 editorial of The Japan Times which discussed Abe's assassination and its aftermath, editor Kanako Takahara commented that the reason that Yamagami was able to attract so much sympathy from society is because "the investigations show that [Yamagami] had a very traumatized experience" and "the anger or any emotions involved were simply transferred to the issues involving the Unification Church", while stating that what Yamagami allegedly did was wrong.

=== Opposition ===
People who opposed Yamagami criticized that the assassination might inspire copycat crimes. Criminologist Nobuo Komiya warned that "more people began to justify [their radical actions] when dealing with their family and religious issues", and that Yamagami being "treated and followed like a revolutionary leader was alarming". Nine months after Abe's death, an attempted assassination of Fumio Kishida occurred; commentators believed that the perpetrator was inspired by Yamagami. Regarding the Japanese government's actions against the Unification Church after the assassination, supporters of the church such as key LDP member Masahiko Kōmura claimed that the filing of a dissolution order against the church was not justified as it would play right into the hands of the terrorist. Some argued that this claim is logically fallacious, and that fulfilling the perpetrator's goal of committing a crime should not be used to let the church escape justice.
