= National Network of Lawyers Against Spiritual Sales =

Japanese anti-cult association

The National Network of Lawyers Against Spiritual Sales (全国霊感商法対策弁護士連絡会, zenkoku reikan-shōhō taisaku bengoshi renraku-kai) (abbreviated to zenkoku benren (全国弁連)) is a non-profit anti-cult association established in May 1987, comprising about 300 lawyers in Japan. It is specialized in providing legal assistance for victims of cult-related frauds, known as spiritual sales (霊感商法) in Japan, from religious organizations, primarily the Unification Church (UC), as well as advocating preventive measures against the malpractices.

The UC, founded by Sun Myung Moon in 1954, has long been accused of employing manipulative and coercive tactics to make victims donate large sum of money or buy overpriced items, in some cases more than what the victims can afford. According to the association the total of confirmed financial damages linked to the UC during the 35 years through 2021 has surpassed ¥123.7 billion (US$899.2 million).

== Public statements ==
On December 24, 2013, the association along with victims of the UC publicly protested singer-actress Junko Sakurada's comeback to the show business since her last retirement in 1992. Sakurada is a member of the UC and is accused of selling expensive religious items. The association believed that her comeback would spread the UC's influence and create more victims.

On September 17, 2021, the association published an open letter for the former prime minister Shinzo Abe, dissuading him from sending any congratulatory or advocating messages to the UC or its front organizations. The association feared that any message from Abe would endorse their anti-social activities in Japan. The letter was published after Abe had given an online speech on "Think Tank 2022 Rally of Hope" held by the Universal Peace Federation (UPF), which is also founded by Sun Myung Moon and Hak Ja Han in 2005. The video was cited as what motivated the suspected gunman, Tetsuya Yamagami whose mother is a member of the Japanese UC and who claimed to be a victim of the UC, to assassinate Abe on July 8, 2022, in Nara City, Japan.

=== Post-assassination of Shinzo Abe ===
Following the press conference by the UC's Tokyo branch on July 11, 2022 regarding the blame on the UC by Yamagami over the financial woes of his family, the association held its own press conference the next day to counter the UC's arguments. The UC claimed that after losing the 2009 legal battle in the Tokyo District Court, (Note: On November 10, 2009, the Tokyo District Court heard the verdict in the "Shinsei" case, in which the UC's spiritual sales practices were judged. Naoki Tanaka, the president of the cult-linked seal retailer Shinsei (新世), was sentenced to two years in prison (suspended for four years) and a 3 million yen fine for violation of the trading laws (intimidation and deception). The director of the seal company was sentenced similarly. The presiding judge recognized the relationship between the defendants and the UC, stating that the crime was "highly organized and severe". The defendants did not appeal. UC-Japan President Eiji Tokuno denied any cult involvement in the scam. Still, he promised to step down to "take moral responsibility" over the case.) they strengthened compliance with the regulations of donation and had no more issues ever since. The association reported that the situation did not improve after 2009 and the UC still uses deceptive tactics to demand their members donate all their savings to the organization. In 2021 alone, the association received legal inquiries involving over ¥300 million from victims of the UC.

On October 11, 2022, the association formally submitted a request for disbanding the UC to the Prosecutor-General, Minister of Justice and Minister of Education, Culture, Sports, Science and Technology on the grounds of repeated illegal demands of donation and the associated civil lawsuits against the church. They stated that the UC and its followers can continue practicing their faith, which is guaranteed by the Constitution of Japan, but without the benefits enjoyed by a registered religious organization such as tax exemption. Chief Cabinet Secretary Hirokazu Matsuno responded to the request on the next day. He stated that "the dissolution order is an extreme measure that they need to consider with utmost care based on the precedents and from the perspective of protecting the freedom of religion." He assured that the Ministry of Education, Culture, Sports, Science and Technology has already been seriously working on the social issues regarding the recent incident.

On May 16, 2023, the association pleaded with the government and parliament to enact new laws regulating organizations whose religious corporation status is being challenged in court. These regulations aim to prevent them from concealing or transferring their properties abroad in anticipation of significant legal claims for damages from their victims. On September 4, 2023, just after news of the government's decision to announce whether to fine the UC and revoke its religious corporation status was leaked, the association reiterated their plea.

== Key figures ==
- Hiroshi Yamaguchi (executive director)
- Hiroshi Watanabe (渡辺 博) (Tokyo office director)
- Masaki Kito (acting executive director)

== See also ==
- Anti-cult movement
