= Attempted assassination of Fumio Kishida =

2023 attack on the Japanese Prime Minister

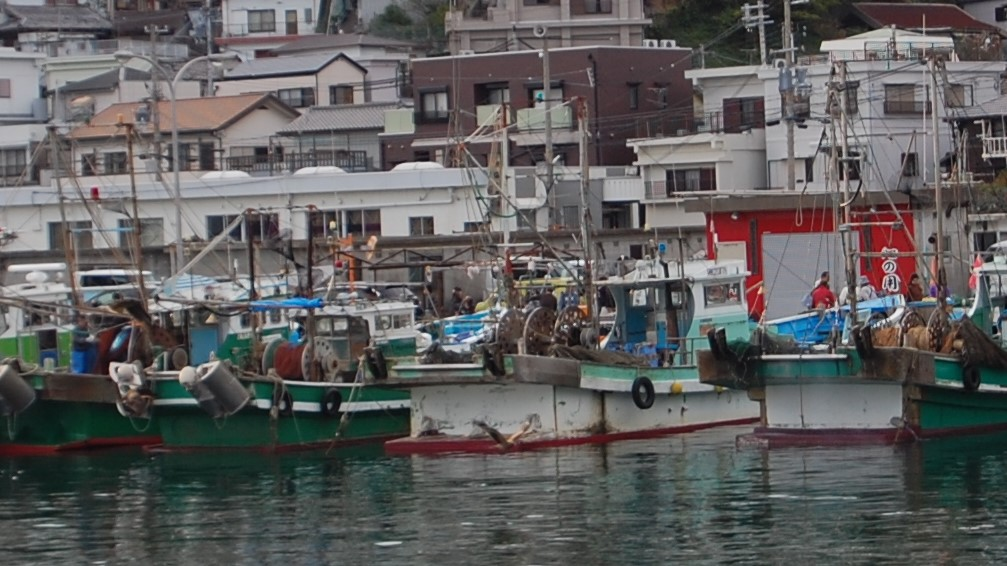
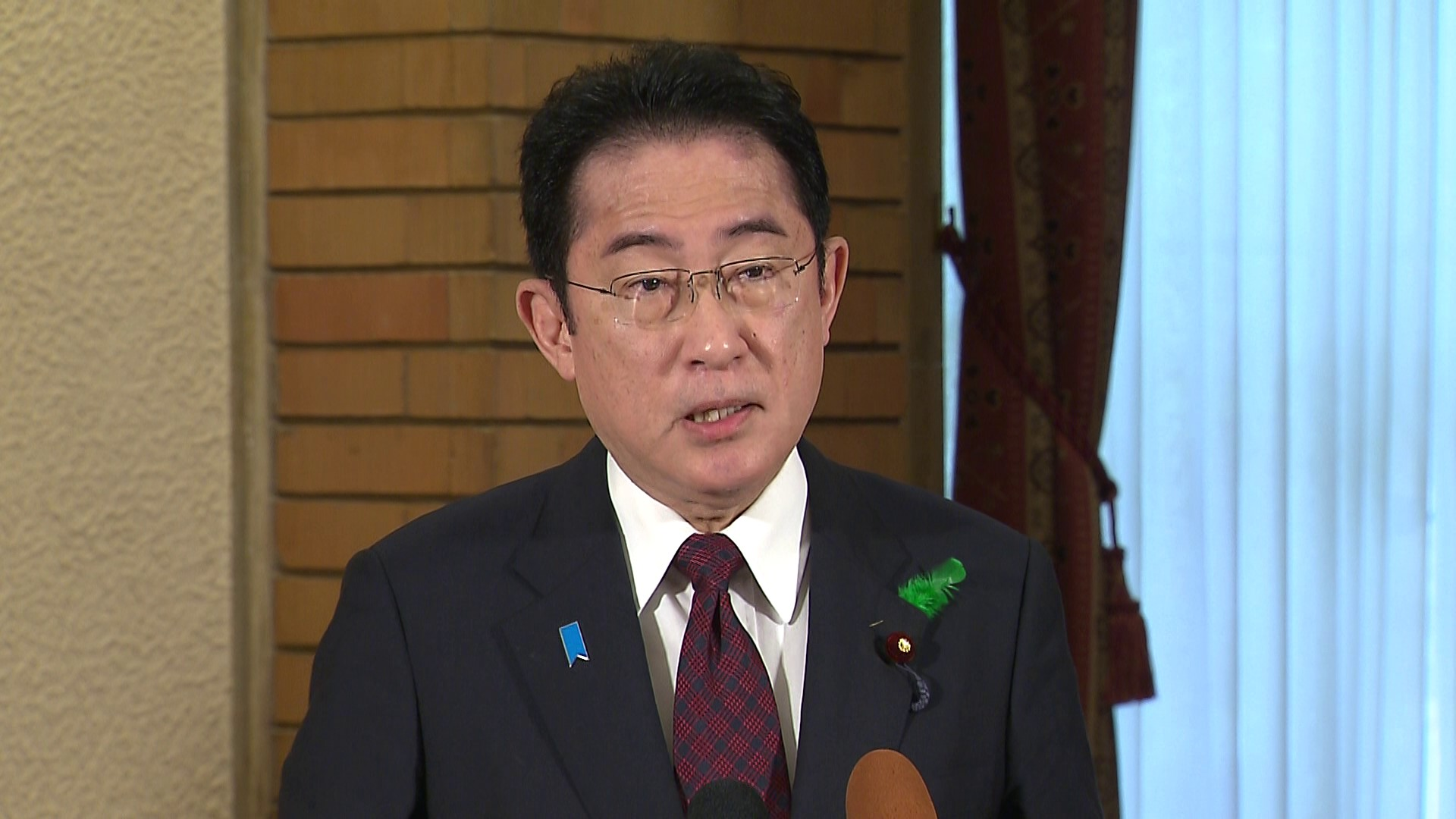
- Above: Saikazaki fishing port photographed from the opposite shore. (The structure in the center of the image is where Kishida was attacked. Photo taken 18 November 2018.); Below: Fumio Kishida gives a press conference the next day regarding the explosion incident.
- Native name: 岸田首相襲撃事件 (Prime Minister Kishida attack incident) 首相演説会場爆発物事件 (Prime Minister's speech venue bomb incident)
- Location: 34°11′20.1″N 135°08′41.4″E; Saikazaki fishing port, Saikazaki, Wakayama, Kansai region, Japan
- Date: 15 April 2023; 3 years ago c. 12:30 pm (JST, UTC+9)
- Target: Fumio Kishida
- Attack type: Explosion by pipe bomb projectile
- Weapon: Pipe bomb (30 cm)
- Injuries: 2
- Perpetrator: Ryūji Kimura (Japanese: 木村 隆二)
- Motive: Political frustration and a desire for attention seeking
- Charges: Attempted murder; Violation of gun and swords control law; Violations of explosives control law

Press conference on the day after the incident

On 15 April 2023, a pipe bomb exploded near Fumio Kishida, the then-prime minister of Japan, who came to the fishing port of Saikazaki, Wakayama, Wakayama Prefecture, in the Kansai region to give a campaign stump speech for the 2023 Wakayama 1st district by-election. Just before Kishida was to give a stump speech, a man threw a pipe bomb. The man who threw the object was captured by local fishermen and the police.

Kishida was not injured because he was evacuated at the moment the pipe bomb was thrown. Fifty seconds after the bomb was thrown, it exploded, injuring two people. The suspect, 24-year-old Ryūji Kimura (Japanese: 木村 隆二), had previously attempted to run in the July 2022 Upper House election but was blocked due to his age and inability to pay the deposit fee. Kimura subsequently filed a lawsuit accusing the eligibility laws of being unconstitutional.

== Background ==
In September 2022, Shūhei Kishimoto (Japanese Member of Parliament from Wakayama 1st district) resigned in order to run for the 2022 governor of Wakayama election. The by-election was held on 23 April 2023 in Wakayama Prefecture. Because Hirofumi Kado, a former MP and a Liberal Democratic Party politician, ran for the by-election, Kishida visited Wakayama to support him as the President of the LDP.

== Incident ==
On 15 April 2023, Japanese prime minister Fumio Kishida was giving a speech in the city of Wakayama in support of a Liberal Democratic Party politician, a candidate running for the by-election, when what was described as a "pipe bomb–like" explosive device was thrown and landed one meter beside him. Kishida was unharmed by the explosive, as he was evacuated from the area by the police bodyguards from the Tokyo Metropolitan Police, but a bystander and a police officer suffered minor injuries. The explosive device dropped near Kishida exploded less than a minute later.

After the explosion, people fled as Kishida was evacuated. While the man who threw it was preparing to throw a second bomb, two local fishermen held the man down. The man was arrested at the scene by plainclothes police officers on suspicion of "obstruction of business". The whole incident was caught on camera. According to residents living near the arrested man's home in Kawanishi, Hyōgo, he appeared to be calm and gentle.

== Aftermath ==
Following the incident, Kishida stated, "I am sorry for causing many people to be concerned. We are in the middle of an important election for our country. We must carry this on together." The following day, Kishida vowed to do everything he could possibly do to ensure safety prior to the 49th G7 summit, which was held in Japan in May 2023. The incident came nine months after the assassination of former prime minister Shinzo Abe on 8 July 2022. On 16 April 2023, security checks intensified for the remainder of the election campaign.

== Legal proceedings ==
Kimura was indicted by Wakayama prosecutors on 7 September 2023 for attempted murder, among other charges. His trial began on 4 February 2025, during which Kimura said he did not intend to kill Kishida. His lawyers also said that Kimura had become disgruntled when his attempt to run in the 2022 Japanese House of Councillors election was blocked due to his age and inability to pay the deposit fee, and said that he carried out the attack to "try to gain attention in the presence of a famous politician to let the public know his thoughts" after a lawsuit he filed over the election proved unsuccessful. On 19 February 2025, Kimura was convicted and sentenced to 10 years in prison.

== See also ==
- Assassination of Shinzo Abe
- Ōkuma Shigenobu
- Gen'yōsha
