= 2023 Wakayama 1st district by-election =

← 2021	23 April 2023	2024 →

Wakayama 1st district
- Turnout: 44.11% (▼11.05 pp)
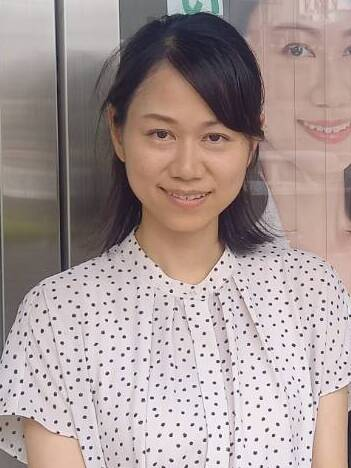

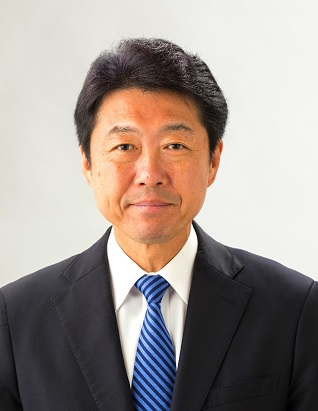
Nominee	Yumi Hayashi	Hirofumi Kado
Party	Ishin	LDP
Popular vote	61,720	55,657
Percentage	47.47%	42.80%
Representative before election
Shūhei Kishimoto
DPP
Elected Representative
Yumi Hayashi
Ishin

2023 Wakayama 1st district by-election was held on 23 April 2023 because Shūhei Kishimoto resigned as a member of the House of Representatives.

== Background ==
Shūhei Kishimoto, member of the Democratic Party, kept a seat in t this constituency, since he defeated the incumbent LDP member of Wakayama 1st district in the 2009 regime change. Kishimoto belonged to the Democratic Party For the People as of 2022 after passing the Kibō no Tō from the Democratic Party. However, Kishimoto announced his candidacy for 2022 Wakayama Prefecture gubernatorial election and left the DPFP and resigned as a member of the House of Representatives.

Following Kishimoto's resignation, a by-election will be held on April 23, 2023. The Democratic Party For the People Kishimoto had belonged to did not field a candidate. Instead, the Nippon Ishin no Kai, which aims to expand its influence in the Kansai region, nominated Yumi Hayashi, a member of the Wakayama city Council, as a candidate. On the other hand, the ruling Liberal Democratic Party tried to nominate Yōsuke Tsuruho, a member of the House of Councillors from Wakayama at-large district, but failed. Eventually, the LDP nominated Hirofumi Kado, a former member of the House of Representatives elected by the Kinki proportional representation block, who had lost to Kishimoto four times in the Wakayama 1st district.

== Candidates ==
Name	Age	Party	Career
Hirofumi Kado	57	Liberal Democratic	Member of the House of Representatives (2012-2021)
Yumi Hayashi	41	Ishin	Member of the Wakayama city Council (2022-2023)
Hideaki Kunishige	62	Communist (supported by SDP)	Standing Committee Member of the Wakayama Prefectural Committee of the Japanese Communist Party
Takahira Yamamoto	48	Seijika Joshi	A former logistics company employee

== Campaign ==
Kishimoto, who won Wakayama Prefecture gubernatorial election and became governor of Wakayama Prefecture, supported Kado, a rival who had competed for a seat in the constituency.

Hiroshi Moriyama, who is the Chairperson of the LDP Election Strategy Committee and conscious of Isin which is based in Osaka, said, "It is the people of Wakayama who decide about Wakayama. I won't let Osaka decide." The LDP placed importance on the by-election, and big-name lawmakers, including Prime Minister Fumio Kishida and former Prime Minister Yoshihide Suga, rushed to support Kado. On the other hand, the Ishin also sent executives to strengthen Hayashi's support. Nobuyuki Baba, the leader of the Ishin, and Osaka Gov. Hirofumi Yoshimura, popular in the Kansai region, rushed to cheer for her many times.

At the end of the election campaign, Tokyo Gov. Yuriko Koike, who tries to approach her old home, the LDP, rushed to cheer for Kado. Referring to Moriyama's remarks, Baba, the leader of the Restoration Party, ridiculed Koike's support, saying, "The slogan is 'It's the people of Wakayama who decide about Wakayama.' Why is there a woman from Tokyo?"

During the election campaign, Kishida, who rushed to cheer for him, was thrown explosives by a man. No one was killed and the man was arrested by the police.

== Result ==
Hayashi defeated Kado by 6,000 votes to win the election for the first time.

2023 Wakayama 1st district by-election
Party	Candidate	Votes	%	±%
Ishin	Yumi Hayashi	61,720	47.47%	New
LDP	Hirofumi Kado	55,657	42.80%	+5.53
JCP	Hideaki Kunishige	11,178	8.60%	N/A
Seijika Joshi	Takahira Yamamoto	1,476	1.13%	New
Majority		6,063	4.67%	
Total votes		130,031	100.00%	
Ishin gain from DPP				

== See also ==
- 2023 Japanese by-elections
