= Abe's assassination =

Abe's assassination may refer to:

- Assassination of Shinzo Abe
- Assassination of Abraham Lincoln
