= Daichi Yamamoto =

Japanese politician (born 1991)

- 山本 大地
- Official portrait, 2026

Member of the House of Representatives
- Incumbent
- Assumed office 29 October 2024
- Preceded by: Yumi Hayashi
- Constituency: Wakayama 1st

Member of the Wakayama City Council
- In office 2022–2024

Personal details
- Born: 28 May 1991 (age 35) Wakayama City, Wakayama, Japan
- Party: Liberal Democratic
- Education: Kansai University

Daichi Yamamoto (山本大地, Yamamoto Daichi; born 28 May 1991) is a Japanese politician serving as a member of the House of Representatives since 2024. From 2022 to 2024, he was a city councillor of Wakayama.
