= Masaki Kito =

Japanese attorney at law (born 1960)

- 紀藤 正樹
- Born: November 21, 1960 (age 65); Ube, Yamaguchi
- Education: Osaka University
- Occupations: Lawyer, TV commentator
- Organization(s): Link Law Office Kito and Partners
- Website: masakikito.com

Masaki Kito (紀藤 正樹, Kitō Masaki; b. November 21, 1960) is a Japanese attorney at law who specializes in consumer affairs, investment frauds and cases involving religious cults, especially Aleph (formerly known as Aum Shinrikyo) and the Unification Church. He regularly appears as a commentator on Japanese TV news and current affairs programs.

== Career ==
Kito was born November 21, 1960, in Ube, Yamaguchi, and is a graduate of Osaka University and Graduate School of Law and Politics of Osaka University. Kito is a head lawyer of Link Law Office Kito and Partners in Tokyo, established in 2001.

He is a member of the Consumer Affairs Committee in Japan Federation of Bar Associations.

He is the acting executive director of the National Network of Lawyers Against Spiritual Sales aims at providing legal assistance for victims of cult-related frauds.

On 26 August 2022, he became one of the members being elected to the "Spiritual Sales Review Committee" in the Consumer Affairs Agency for providing suggestions to regulate the Unification Church's predatory fundraising. The committee was established under the order of Digital Minister Taro Kono as the approval rating of Prime Minister Fumio Kishida's cabinet continued to plunge due to intense media scrutiny of the ties between his party with the church since the assassination of Shinzo Abe.

== Predecessor ==
Before Kito, victims of Unification Church and Aum Shinrikyo were represented by Tsutsumi Sakamoto, who was murdered, together with his family, by several members of Aum Shinrikyo.

== Major publications ==
- Mind Control (Risk in our lives) (2012, ASCOM)
- Online shopping you do not want to fail (失敗しないネットショッピング) (Iwanami Shinsho Active) (2002) [Japanese]
- Religious Corporation Act for the 21st Century (Asahi News Shop) (1995) [Japanese]

== See also ==
- Anti-cult movement
- Yoshihiro Yasuda
