= Nara Medical University =

Higher education institution in Nara Prefecture, Japan

- 奈良県立医科大学
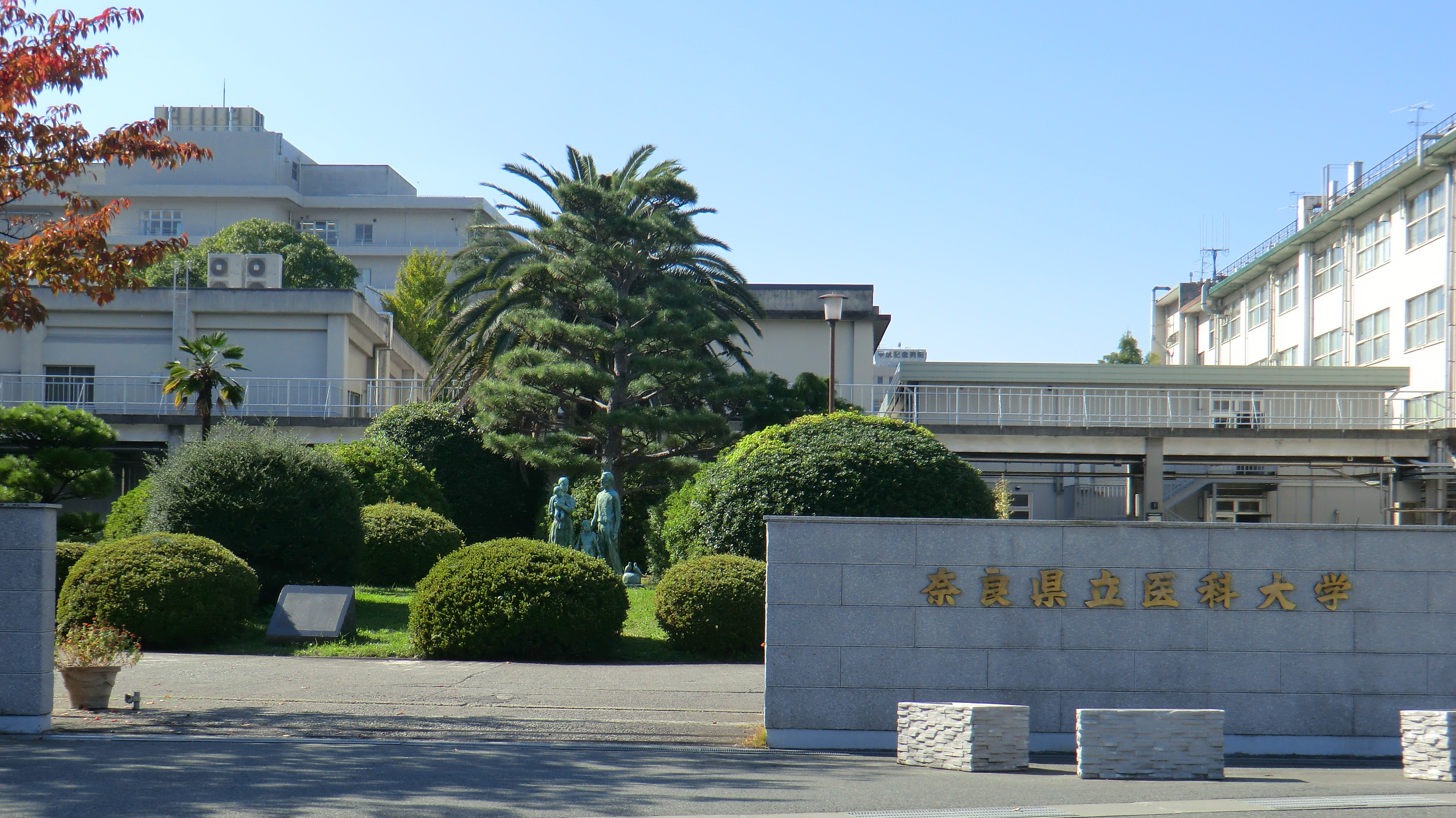
- Main entrance of the Nara Medical University.
- Former name: Nara Prefectural Medical College
- Type: Public (Prefectural); Medical
- Established: 1945 Nara Medical College; 1947 Nara Medical University
- Location: Kashihara, Nara, Japan; 34°30′15″N 135°47′37″E
- Website: Official website
- Location within Nara Prefecture

Nara Medical University (奈良県立医科大学, Nara Kenritsu Ika Daigaku), abbreviated as NMU in English, is a public university (prefectural university) in Kashihara, Nara, Japan. Located near Kashihara Shrine, it is the only medical school in Nara Prefecture.

== History ==
During the World War II, Nara Prefectural Medical College (奈良県立医学専門学校, Nara Kenritsu Igaku Senmongakkō) was established to supply surgeons for Imperial Army and Navy in April 1945.

After the war ended, in 1947, Nara Medical College was promoted to a university and renamed Nara Medical University.

In 2007, the college of nursing, junior college of nursing established in 1996, was abolished and absorbed into school of medicine (now faculty of nursing).

On July 8, 2022, former Japanese prime minister Shinzo Abe was transported to Nara Medical University Hospital after being shot. He was shot at approximately 11:30 JST. Abe was shortly airlifted to Nara Medical University Hospital at 12:09 in cardiopulmonary arrest. At 5:03 Abe was declared dead, he died due to having bled to death from deep wounds to the heart and the front of his neck.

== Organization ==
=== Programs ===
- School of Medicine (医学部)
  - Faculty of Medicine (医学科) – 6-year medical degree
  - Faculty of Nursing (看護学科) – 4-year Bachelor of Nursing
- Graduate School of Medicine (医学研究科)
  - Doctor Course – 4-year
  - Master Course – 2-year

=== Nara Medical University Hospital ===
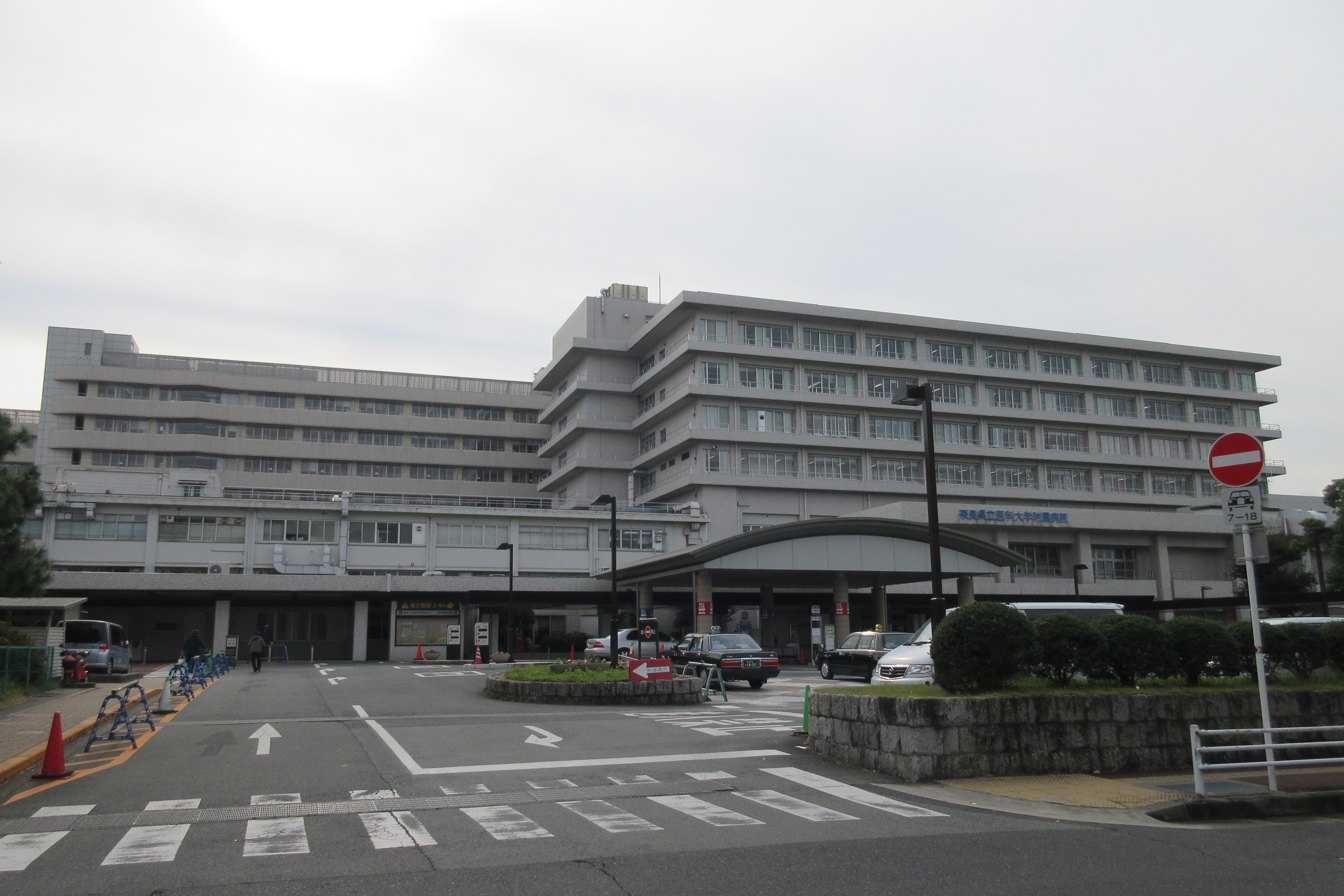
Hospital building.

The Nara Medical University Hospital (奈良県立医科大学附属病院) is a hospital attached to the Nara Medical University. It is the hospital where former Japanese Prime Minister Shinzo Abe died of his wounds after his assassination on 8 July 2022.

== College of Nursing ==
Nara Medical University College of Nursing (奈良県立医科大学看護短期大学部, Nara Kenritsu Ika Daigaku Kango Tanki Daigakubu) was a public junior college associated with Nara Medical University, which opened in April 1996.

== Notable alumni ==
- Osamu Tezuka (MD) – mangaka
