= Izumi Miyazaki =

Japanese politician

- 宮﨑 泉
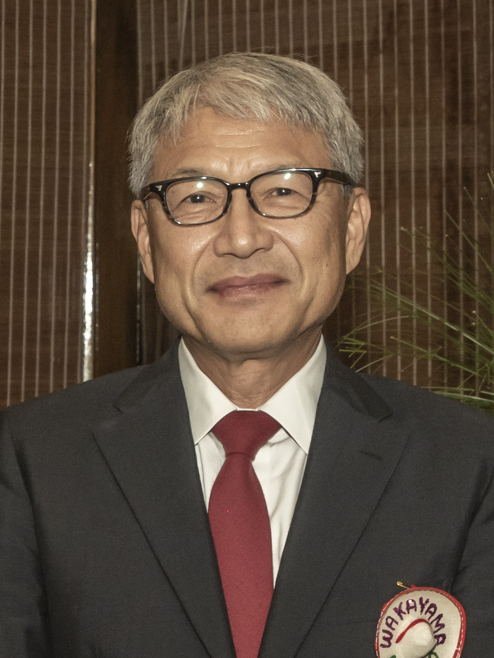
- Miyazaki in 2025

Governor of Wakayama Prefecture
- Incumbent
- Assumed office 3 June 2025
- Monarch: Naruhito
- Preceded by: Shūhei Kishimoto

Personal details
- Born: February 21, 1959 (age 67) Wakayama, Japan
- Party: Independent
- Children: 2
- Education: University of Osaka
- Website: https://miyazaki-izumi.com

Izumi Miyazaki (宮﨑泉, Miyazaki Izumi; born 21 February 1959) is a Japanese politician who has served as governor of Wakayama Prefecture since June 2025. He previously served as superintendent of the Wakayama Prefectural Board of Education and as vice governor of Wakayama Prefecture.

== Biography ==
Miyazaki was born on February 21, 1959, in Wakayama City, Wakayama Prefecture. He attended Nozaki Elementary School and Wakayama Municipal Kahoku Junior High School, before graduating from Wakayama Prefectural Tōin Junior and Senior High School. He graduated from University of Osaka and joined the Wakayama Prefectural Government in 1982.

During his career in the prefectural government, Miyazaki served in several administrative positions, including director of the Personnel Division and head of the Governor's Office. He served as superintendent of the Wakayama Prefectural Board of Education from 2019 until March 2025.

In April 2025, Miyazaki was appointed vice governor of Wakayama Prefecture. Shortly after taking office, Governor Shūhei Kishimoto died suddenly on April 15, 2025. Miyazaki subsequently served as acting governor while the prefecture prepared for a gubernatorial election.

Miyazaki announced his candidacy in the 2025 Wakayama gubernatorial election. He received endorsements from the Liberal Democratic Party, Komeito, the Constitutional Democratic Party of Japan, the Democratic Party For the People, the Social Democratic Party, and organizations representing municipalities in Wakayama Prefecture.

The gubernatorial election was held in June 2025. Miyazaki won the election and became the 23rd elected governor of Wakayama Prefecture. He took office on June 3, 2025.

== Personal life ==
Miyazaki is married and has one son and one daughter. He also has a granddaughter.

Political offices
| Preceded by Shūhei Kishimoto | Governor of Wakayama Prefecture; 3 June 2025 – present | Incumbent |
