= Assassination of Shinzo Abe =

2022 shooting in Nara, Japan

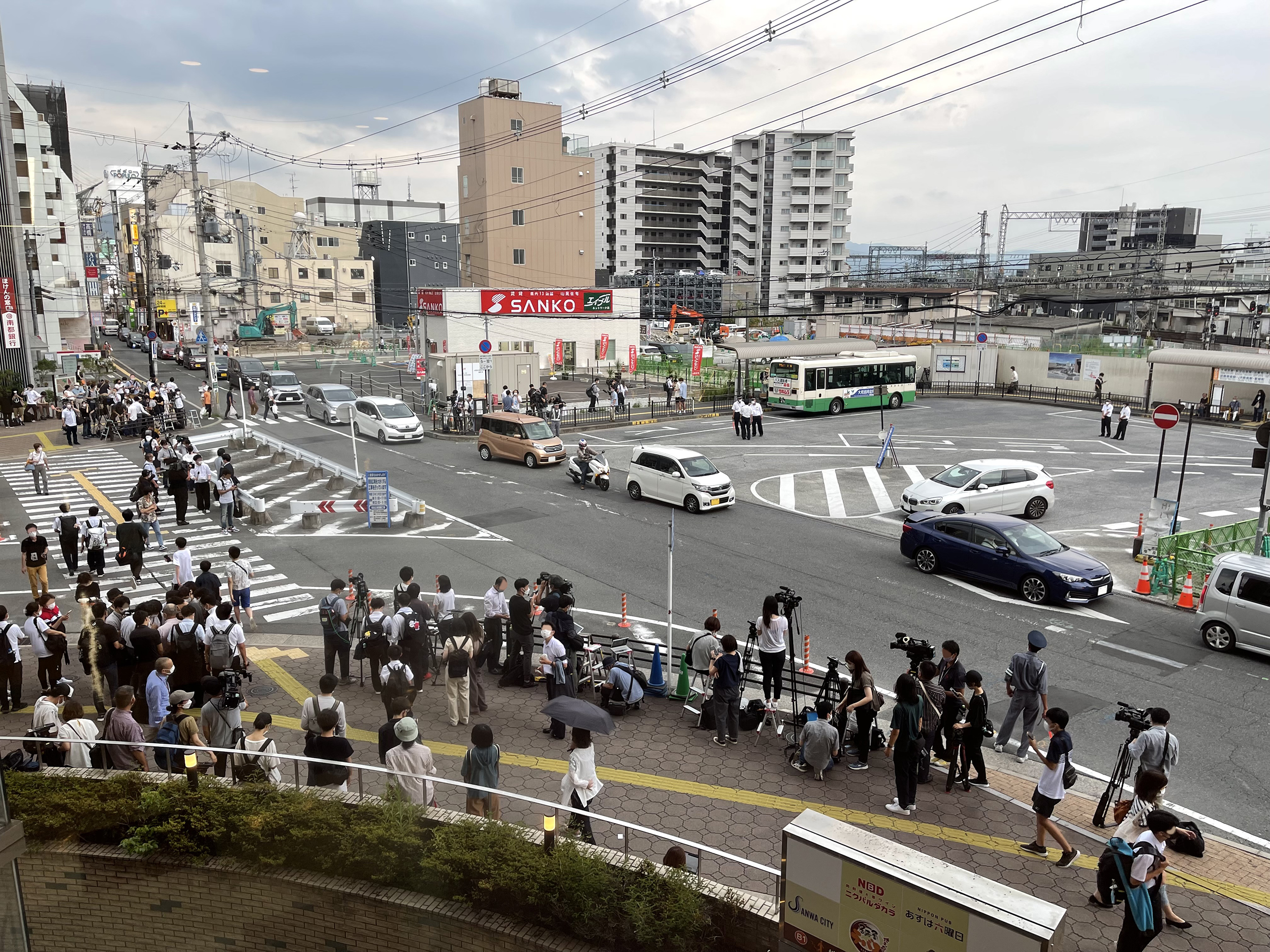
- Road junction at Yamato-Saidaiji Station, several hours after the shooting
- Location: 34°41′38.6″N 135°47′02.2″E near Yamato-Saidaiji Station in Nara, Nara Prefecture, Japan
- Date: 8 July 2022; 4 years ago c. 11:30 am (JST)
- Target: Shinzo Abe
- Attack type: Assassination by shooting
- Weapon: Improvised shotgun with a pistol grip (Note: While many sources report the weapon to be a shotgun, the Nara Prefectural Police Department reported that the weapon was a pistol. According to the police, the suspect called his homemade gun used in the assassination a "shotgun" (散弾銃).)
- Deaths: 1
- Victim: Shinzo Abe
- Perpetrator: Tetsuya Yamagami
- Motive: Grudge toward the Unification Church over his family's financial ruin caused by his mother's donations, with which Abe was connected
- Convictions: Murder; gun law violations; property damage
- Sentence: Life in prison

On 8 July 2022, Shinzo Abe, the former prime minister of Japan and serving member of the Japanese House of Representatives, was assassinated while speaking at a political event outside Yamato-Saidaiji Station in Nara City, Nara Prefecture. Abe was delivering a campaign speech for a Liberal Democratic Party (LDP) candidate when he was fatally shot by 41-year-old Tetsuya Yamagami with an improvised firearm. Abe was transported via medical helicopter to Nara Medical University Hospital in Kashihara, where he was pronounced dead.

Leaders from many nations expressed shock and dismay at Abe's assassination, which was the first of a former Japanese prime minister since Saitō Makoto and Takahashi Korekiyo during the February 26 incident in 1936, as well as the first of a major political figure in Japan since Inejiro Asanuma's assassination in 1960. Prime Minister Fumio Kishida decided to hold a state funeral for Abe on 27 September. Yamagami was arrested at the scene and charged with attempted murder, which was upgraded to murder after Abe's death was confirmed. Yamagami told investigators that he had shot Abe in relation to a grudge he held against the Unification Church (UC), a new religious movement to which Abe and his family had political ties, over his mother's bankruptcy in 2002.

The assassination brought scrutiny from Japanese society and media against the UC's alleged practice of pressuring believers into making exorbitant donations. Japanese dignitaries and legislators were forced to disclose their relationship with the UC, and Kishida was forced to reshuffle his cabinet amid plummeting public approval. Within months, the LDP announced that it would no longer have any relationship with the UC and its associated organisations, and would expel members who did not break ties with the group. Before the end of 2022, the House of Representatives and the House of Councillors passed two bills to restrict the activities of religious organisations such as the UC and provide relief to victims. In 2025, a Japanese court ordered the UC to disband in Japan, a decision which was upheld by the Tokyo High Court in 2026.

Abe's killing has been described as one of the most effective and successful political assassinations in recent history due to the backlash against the UC that it provoked. The Economist remarked that "Yamagami's political violence has proved stunningly effective ... Political violence seldom fulfills so many of its perpetrator's aims." Writing for The Atlantic, Robert F. Worth described Yamagami as "among the most successful assassins in history". On 21 January 2026, Yamagami was sentenced to life in prison for the assassination.

== Background ==
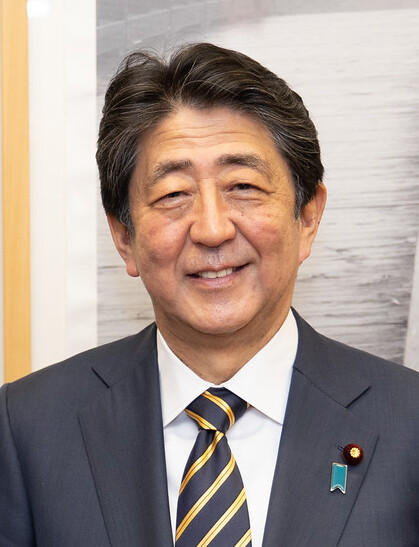
Abe in March 2022

Shinzo Abe had served as Prime Minister of Japan in 2006 and 2007 and again from 2012 to 2020, when he resigned due to health concerns. He was the longest-serving prime minister in Japan's history. His maternal grandfather, Nobusuke Kishi, was himself prime minister from 1957 to 1960, and like Abe, was the target of an assassination attempt, which he survived, unlike Abe.

Abe was the first former Japanese prime minister to have been assassinated since Makoto Saitō and Korekiyo Takahashi, who were killed during the February 26 incident in 1936, the first Japanese legislator to be assassinated since Kōki Ishii was killed in 2002, and the first Japanese politician to be assassinated during an electoral campaign since Iccho Itoh, then-mayor of Nagasaki, who was shot dead during his mayoral race in April 2007.

=== Relationship between Abe's family and the Unification Church ===
Abe, as well as his father Shintaro Abe and his grandfather Nobusuke Kishi, had longstanding ties to the Unification Church (UC), a new religious movement known for its mass wedding ceremonies. Known officially as the Family Federation for World Peace and Unification (FFWPU), the movement was founded by Sun Myung Moon in South Korea in 1954. Followers of the UC are colloquially known as "Moonies". Moon, who died in 2012, was a self-declared messiah and ardent anti-communist.

Kishi's postwar political agenda led him to work closely with Ryōichi Sasakawa, a businessman and nationalist politician during the Second World War. As Moon's advisor, Sasakawa helped establish the UC in Japan in 1963 and assumed the roles of both patron and president of the church's political wing, International Federation for Victory over Communism (IFVOC, 国際勝共連合), which would forge intimate ties with Japan's conservative politicians. In this way, Sasakawa and Kishi shielded what would become one of the most widely distrusted groups in contemporary Japan. Moon's organisations, including the UC and the overtly political IFVOC, were financially supported by Sasakawa and organized crime figure Yoshio Kodama.

When the UC still had a few thousand followers, its headquarters was located on land once owned by Kishi in Nanpeidaichō, Shibuya, Tokyo, and UC officials frequently visited the adjacent Kishi residence. By the early 1970s, UC members were being used by the Liberal Democratic Party (LDP) as campaign workers without compensation. LDP politicians were also required to visit the UC's headquarters in South Korea and receive Moon's lectures on theology, regardless of their religious views or membership. In return, Japanese authorities shielded the UC from legal penalties over their often fraudulent and aggressive practices. Subsequently, the UC gained much influence in Japan, laying the groundwork for its push into the United States and its later entrenchment.

Such a relationship was passed on to Kishi's son-in-law, former foreign minister Shintaro Abe, who attended a dinner party held by Moon at the Imperial Hotel in 1974. In the US, the 1978 Fraser Report, an inquiry by the US Congress into American–South Korean relations, determined that Kim Jong-pil, the founding director of the South Korean intelligence service and two-time prime minister of South Korea, had "organized" the UC in the early 1960s and was using it "as a political tool" on behalf of the authoritarian regime of President Park Chung Hee. In 1989, Moon urged his followers to establish their footing in Japan's parliament, then install themselves as secretaries for the Japanese lawmakers, and focus on those of Shintaro Abe's faction in the LDP. Moon also stressed that they must construct their political influence not only in the parliament, but also on Japan's district level.

Shinzo Abe continued this relationship, and in May 2006, when he was Chief Cabinet Secretary, he and several cabinet ministers sent congratulatory telegrams to a mass wedding ceremony organised by the UC's front group, Universal Peace Federation (UPF, 天宙平和連合), for 2,500 couples of Japanese and Korean men and women.

In spring 2021, the chairman of the UPF's Japanese branch, Masayoshi Kajikuri, called Abe and asked if the latter would consider speaking before an upcoming UPF rally in September if former US president Donald Trump also attended. Abe replied that he had to accept the offer should that be the case; he formally agreed to his participation on 24 August 2021. At the September rally, held ten months before the assassination, Abe stated to Kajikuri that, "The image of the Great Father [Moon] crossing his arms and smiling gave me goosebumps. I still respectably remember the sincerity [you] showed in the last six elections in the past eight years." Kajikuri claimed that he originally invited three unnamed former Japanese prime ministers, but was turned down due to concern of being used as poster boys for UC's mission.

According to research by Nikkan Gendai, ten out of twenty members in the Fourth Abe Cabinet had connections to the UC, but these connections were largely ignored by Japanese journalists. After the assassination, Japanese defence minister Nobuo Kishi, Abe's younger brother, was forced to disclose that he had been supported by the UC in past elections.

=== Unification Church practices in Japan ===
The Japanese government certified the UC as a religious organisation in 1964; the Agency for Cultural Affairs classifies the UC as a Christian organisation. Since then, the government was unable to prevent the UC's activities because of the freedom of religion guaranteed in the Constitution of Japan, according to Mitsuhiro Suganuma, the former section head of the Public Security Intelligence Agency's Second Intelligence Department.

According to historians, up to 70% of the UC's wealth has been accumulated through outdoor fundraising rounds. Steven Hassan, a former UC member engaged in the deprogramming of other UC members, describes these as "spiritual sales" (reikan shōhō, 霊感商法), with parishioners scanning obituaries, going door-to-door, and saying, "Your dead loved one is communicating with us, so please go to the bank and send money to the Unification Church so your loved one can ascend to heaven in the spirit world."

Moon's theology teaches that his homeland Korea is the "Adam country", home of the rulers destined to control the world. Japan is the "fallen Eve country". The dogma teaches Eve had sexual relations with Satan and then seduced Adam, which caused mankind to fall from grace (original sin), while Moon was appointed to bring mankind to salvation. Japan must therefore be subservient to Korea. This was used to encourage their Japanese followers into offering things to Korea via the church.

According to journalist Fumiaki Tada and other former UC followers, the conditions for Japanese followers to participate in the UC's mass wedding were substantially more difficult than Korean people, on the grounds of "Japan's sinful occupation of Korea" between 1910 and 1945. In 1992, each Japanese follower needed to successfully bring three more people into the church, fulfill a certain quota of fundraising by selling the church's merchandise, undergo fasting for seven days, and pay an appreciation fee of 1.4 million yen. For Korean people, the fee for attending the mass wedding was 2 million won (about 200 thousand yen in September 2022). Most Korean attendees were not followers of the church to begin with. According to one interviewee, the UC considered it an honour for a Japanese woman to be married to a Korean man, like an abandoned dog being picked up by a prince. If the Japanese followers wanted to leave their partners of the mass wedding or the church, they were told they would be damned to the "hell of hell".

In 1987, about 300 lawyers in Japan set up an association called the National Network of Lawyers Against Spiritual Sales (Zenkoku Benren) to help victims of the UC and similar organisations. According to statistics compiled by the association's lawyers between 1987 and 2021, the association and local government consumer centers received 34,537 complaints alleging that UC had forced people to make unreasonably large donations or purchase large amounts of items, amounting to about 123.7 billion yen. According to the internal data compiled by the UC which leaked to the media, the donation by the Japanese followers between 1999 and 2011 was about 60 billion yen annually.

== Timeline ==
=== Abe's schedule ===
Abe was initially scheduled to deliver a speech in Nagano Prefecture on 8 July 2022 in support of Sanshirō Matsuyama, an LDP candidate in upcoming elections to the House of Councillors. That event was abruptly cancelled on 7 July following allegations of misconduct and corruption related to Matsuyama, and was replaced by a similar event in Nara Prefecture at which Abe was to deliver a speech in support of Kei Satō, an LDP councillor running for re-election. The LDP division in Nara Prefecture stated this new schedule was not generally publicly known, but NHK reported that the event had been widely advertised on Twitter and by sound truck. Nara police and Satō's campaign staff inspected the site on the evening before the incident, and the head of the prefectural police had approved of the security plan a few hours before the incident; one prefectural assembly member later said, "I thought it was a dangerous place that made it easy to attack former Prime Minister Abe from the cars and bicycles that pass along the road behind him".

At approximately 11:10 a.m. on 8 July, Satō began speaking at a road junction near the north exit of Yamato-Saidaiji Station in Nara City. Abe arrived nine minutes later, and began his speech at around 11:29 am. He was accompanied by VIP protection officers from the Tokyo Metropolitan Police Department alongside VIP protection officers from the Nara Prefectural Police.

=== Attack ===
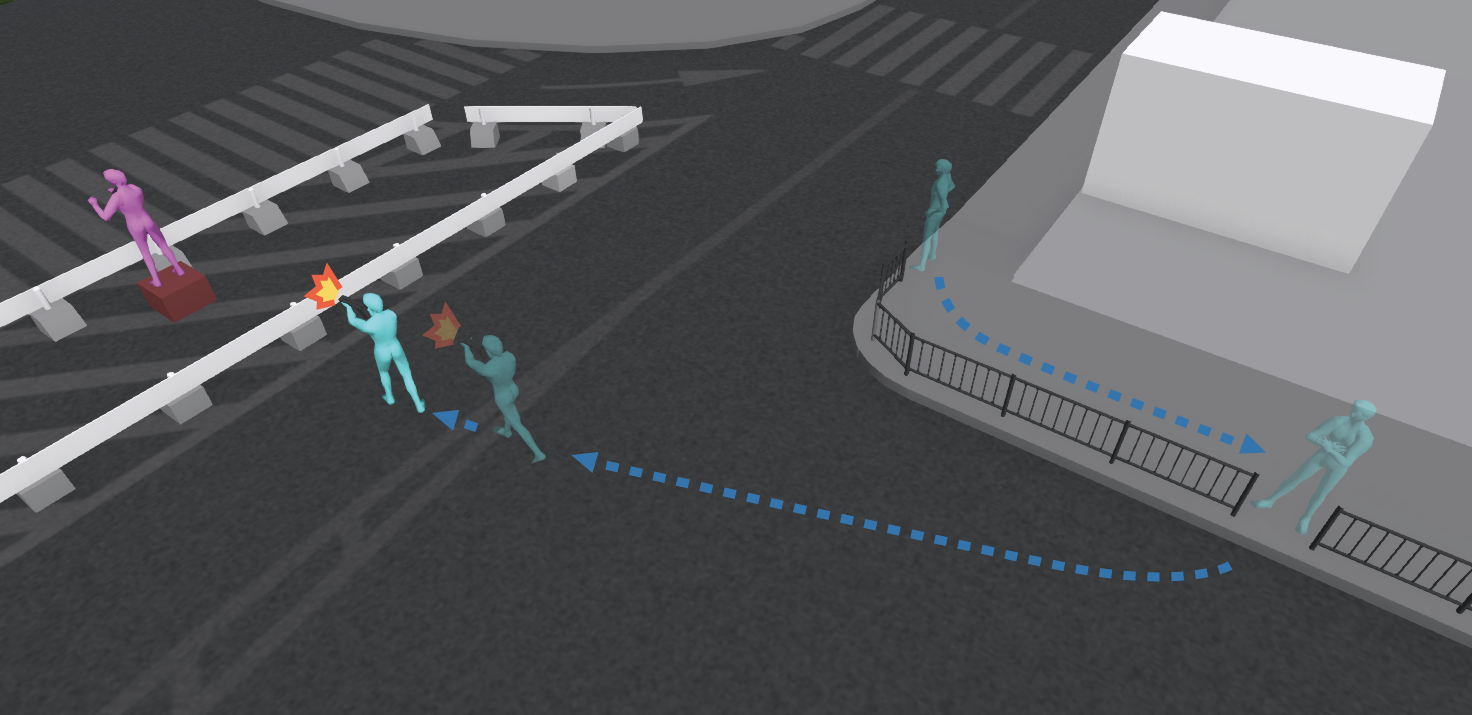
Positions of Abe (purple) and Yamagami (blue) at the time of the shooting. Abe's security detail and other individuals are not shown. Not drawn to scale.

External videos
- Reconstruction of the shooting
- 2m26s to the shooting of the former Prime Minister Shinzo Abe: Videos reveal security holes, The Nikkei

While Abe was delivering his speech, the perpetrator, Tetsuya Yamagami, was able to approach within several metres, despite the presence of security. At around 11:30 am, when Abe said, "Instead of thinking about why he [Satō] cannot do it ..." (「彼はできない理由を考えるのではなく...」), he was shot at from behind by the masked Yamagami with a battery-ignited homemade gun with a pistol grip, which was made of metal pipes, wooden board and duct tape and resembled a sawed-off double-barrelled shotgun, capable of firing six pellets at a time. The first shot missed, causing Abe to turn around and look towards the sound, at which point a second shot was fired, hitting Abe in the exposed neck and left chest. Abe then took a few steps forward, fell to his knees, and collapsed. Abe's security detained the suspect, who did not resist. According to security guards stationed at the scene during the assassination, the sound of the gunshot was very different from that of a conventional firearm, reminiscent of fireworks or a tire blowout. This may explain the delay of response from Abe's bodyguards after the first round of gunshot.

=== Treatment ===
Paramedics arrived on the scene at 11:37 am, and an ambulance later arrived at 11:41 am. Police sources told NHK that Abe was initially conscious and responsive after being shot. A doctor who arrived at the scene said there were no signs indicating Abe was conscious. Shortly thereafter, he was transported to a local hospital by emergency helicopter with a wound to the right side of his neck and internal bleeding in his left chest, arriving approximately 50 minutes after being shot. He was reported to have no vital signs when he arrived at Nara Medical University Hospital in Kashihara, due to cardiopulmonary arrest prior to his arrival. At 2:45 pm, a press conference was held by Prime Minister Fumio Kishida, who stated that Abe was in critical condition and that "doctors [were] doing everything they [could]".

=== Death declaration ===
Abe's wife Akie arrived at the hospital at 4:55 pm. Despite doctors' efforts, Abe was pronounced dead at the hospital at 5:03 pm, around five and a half hours after being shot. He was 67 years old. Hidetada Fukushima, a doctor at the hospital, said the cause of Abe's death was blood loss, despite four hours of blood transfusions that saw the administration of 100 units of blood. (Note: In Japan, one unit of normal blood transfusion is about 200 millilitres. However, in the case of acute blood loss, the patient is instead administered "red blood cell transfusion" which is 140 millilitres per unit; in other words, Abe was administered 14,000 cc (14 L) of blood.) Fukushima said that Abe was hit by two bullets and that one bullet was not found in Abe's body. The police autopsy concluded Abe died from loss of blood after a bullet damaged an artery under his collarbone.

=== Visitations ===
Several hours after the assassination, both former prime minister Yoshihide Suga and Chief Cabinet Secretary Hirokazu Matsuno visited the hospital where Abe's body was held.

The body was subject to a judicial autopsy and departed from the hospital with Abe's widow at 5:55 a.m. on 9 July. Five vehicles carrying various old professional acquaintances of Abe's, including former defence minister Tomomi Inada, took part in the motorcade conveying Abe's body back to his home in Tokyo. At 1:35 pm, the party arrived at Abe's Tokyo residence. On their arrival, Sanae Takaichi, the chairman of the LDP Policy Research Council, Tatsuo Fukuda, the chairman of the LDP General Council and Hisashi Hieda, the chairman of Fujisankei Communications Group and a friend of Abe's, received them. Afterwards, Kishida visited for condolences, and former prime ministers Yoshirō Mori and Junichiro Koizumi, Hiroyuki Hosoda (Speaker of the House of Representatives), Akiko Santō (President of the House of Councillors), Toshihiro Nikai (former Secretary-General of the LDP), Kōichi Hagiuda (Abe's close aide and the Minister of Economy, Trade and Industry), Tetsuo Saito (a politician of Komeito and the Minister of Land, Infrastructure, Transport and Tourism), and Yuriko Koike (the Governor of Tokyo) also visited for condolences.

== Perpetrator ==
Tetsuya Yamagami (山上 徹也), a resident of Nara, was arrested at the scene of the assassination. He was 41 years old, had no prior criminal history, and was unemployed at the time of his arrest. In his testimonies and letters, Yamagami claimed that he was driven by a grudge against the Unification Church for ruining his family. Even though he originally planned to target Hak Ja Han, then president of the church, he was unable to approach her, so he switched to Shinzo Abe, who he believed was "one of the most influential sympathisers" of the church.

Yamagami was born on 10 September 1980 in Mie Prefecture to affluent parents who ran a local construction business. Described as quiet and reserved in high school, he wrote in his graduation yearbook that he "didn't have a clue" what he wanted to do in the future. In an interview with The Asahi Shimbun, a relative had stated that Yamagami had been struggling since childhood with the UC, of which his mother had become a devoted member. After the death of his maternal grandfather, his mother inherited ownership of the family business, but she eventually donated most of the family wealth and assets to the church, impoverishing the whole family.

== Aftermath ==
=== Effects on election ===
At 11:45 am, the Japanese government established a liaison office within the crisis management center of the Prime Minister's Office. Kishida, who was campaigning in Sagae, Yamagata Prefecture, cancelled his remaining schedule and returned to Tokyo by 2:29 pm. According to Chief Cabinet Secretary Hirokazu Matsuno, all other members of Kishida's cabinet were recalled to Tokyo except the foreign minister, Yoshimasa Hayashi, who was in Indonesia for the 2022 G20 Bali summit. Kishida later ordered heightened security for high-ranking politicians in Japan. Officers from the Security Police were deployed to protect Akie Abe after she arrived in Kyoto as a precautionary measure.

Most political leaders cancelled all campaign events for the remainder of 8 July. Campaigning resumed the day after, on 9 July, with major party leaders vowing to not allow violence to disrupt the democratic process. The LDP subsequently won a plurality of 119 seats (out of 248) in the House of Councillors in the 10 July elections.

=== Effects on media broadcast ===
NHK General TV, and four of Japan's five major commercial television networks, cancelled or postponed all scheduled programming to broadcast live news coverage for the rest of the day, as did several radio stations. The second episode of the anime series Teppen—!!!, scheduled to air on 9 July, was announced to be cancelled, because its plot concerned an attempted assassination. The episode aired on 10 September.

=== National Police Agency changes ===
On 20 August 2022, the National Police Agency announced that rules for conducting VIP protection will be revamped, which will also expand VIP protection training.

The NPA announced that from 26 August 2022, they will examine all VIP protection plans from the prefectural police and will instruct them to make recommended changes if and when it is deemed necessary. The NPA also announced that they will extend their "cyber patrol" force which was originally established to monitor online illegal drug trade and child pornography to also swiftly identify potential threats against VIPs found on social media and take early counter measures.

=== Resignation ===
On 25 August 2022, Commissioner General Itaru Nakamura of the National Police Agency said that he would resign from his post to take responsibility for the shooting incident on Abe. The chief of the Nara Prefectural Police Tomoaki Onizuka and the director general of the National Police Agency's Security Bureau Kenichi Sakurazawa also announced their resignation.

=== Unification Church–related ===
==== Responses by the Unification Church ====
The Unification Church distanced itself from the assassination and confirmed the involvement of Yamagami's mother with it by Tomihiro Tanaka, the chair of the church's Tokyo branch, during a press conference on 11 July. Tanaka expressed his "sorry and heartfelt" condolences. He confirmed that Yamagami was not a UC member, but his mother joined in 1998, (Note: Unification Church's Tokyo chair claimed that Yamagami's mother first joined their church in 1998 during the 11 July 2022 press conference, Yamagami's paternal uncle claimed that it was around 1991 while being interviewed by press on 15 July 2022. Yamagami's alleged Twitter account claimed that the UC stole his family's wealth when he was 14, adding to Yamagami's birth year of 1980, this would suggest the financial woe of his family caused by the UC began no later than 1994.) temporarily disappeared in 2009, and participated monthly in church events for the last half-year. Tanaka stated that the mother was bankrupted around 2002, and there is no record of such donation requests. He denied that resentment against the Church had led directly to the murder, and affirmed the Church's will for cooperation with police to establish a motive if asked. Tanaka also downplayed the alleged close tie between the organisation and Abe, stating that the former prime minister, not being a registered member or advisor, only delivered speeches for their "friendly entity", the UPF.

On 14 July, the UC released a statement claiming that before the assassination, they reached an agreement to refund 50 million yen donated by the suspect's mother from 2004 to 2015, and that they have no more record of new donations made by her after the refund. According to the suspect's relatives, the refunded 50 million yen was again donated to the UC.

At a press conference in Seoul on 19 July 2022, Chung Hwan Kwak, formerly a prominent leader in the UC, apologised and stated that he felt that the organisation was responsible for Abe's death. Kwak said that Sun Myung Moon enjoyed a close relationship with Abe's father and grandfather, stating: "Donations from Japan have greatly contributed to Moon's activities around the world". Kwak argued that he tried to reform the UC's Japanese branch and end the practice of spiritual sales, but that Jung Ok Yoo and other church leaders resisted and allowed the practice to continue. South Korean church officials and the Japanese branch denied Kwak's claim.

The UC claimed that negative media reports related to the assassination led to hate speech and death threats against their followers. A receptionist working at the Shibuya office of the UC stated that she had been receiving two to three trolling letters every day, some containing home rubbish and replacement razors. On 18 August 2022, the church organised a rally in Seoul against the Japanese media. About three thousand followers, comprising a considerable portion of Japanese women married to Korean men via the UC's mass weddings, were transported from their facility in Gapyeong County via coaches to participate in this protest. All participants refused to be interviewed by any Japanese media on site, with deliberate intervention from the staff of the church. On 21 August, the UC released a statement on its Japanese site which condemned the media's scrutiny towards the organisation's political ties as a witch hunt, demanding apologies to their followers and threatening legal action. On 27 October 2022, the lawyers representing the UC announced that they had filed a civil case for defamation against TBS Radio, Nippon TV and the guests who commentated on their shows, Masaki Kito and Yoshifu Arita, demanding public apologies and a total of 33 million yen in damage.

In an interview with All-Nippon News Network, Korean journalist Song Ju-yeol (Note: Also romanised as Song Joo-yeol. His name is localised as "ソン・ジュヨル" (Son Ju Yoru) by Japanese media.) (송주열) said that, according to an informant, the assassination had thrown the UC into a state of crisis. Negative attention towards the church could realistically impede their capability to raise the funds needed for operating the organisation globally, a major portion of which was contributed by their Japanese followers. The 2023 new year greeting by Tomihiro Tanaka for a private meeting was leaked and reported by media, in that Tanaka addressed their second generation followers to prepare for a climactic battle against religious persecution, as "2023 marked the 400th anniversary of persecution against Christianity in Japan beginning in 1623" (Note: There are records of systemic persecution against foreign missionaries in Japan which predates Tokugawa Hidetada's 1605–1623 ruling, such as the Bateren Edict issued in 1587. The "Expulsion of all missionaries from Japan" was issued in 1614 by Tokugawa Hidetada.). At the anniversary of Abe's assassination, a private statement was made by Hak Ja Han to the top executives of the church. Han reinforced that "Japan is a country of war criminals and must make compensation to Korea" and ordered that Japanese politicians, including Kishida, "receive education" for persecuting their organisation. The UC refused to verify the authenticity of the leaked recording when requested for comment by the media.

==== Responses from the Kishida Cabinet ====
The assassination resulted in renewed public interest into the relationship between the UC and the LDP. On 31 July 2022, Kishida demanded the members of his party to "carefully explain" their relationship with the church to the public. The alleged relationship caused the Kishida Cabinet's approval to drop, by 8% in July according to Yomiuri Shimbun or by 13% according to NHK. Both polls also showed that over 80% of respondents felt that the disclosure by the politicians of their relationship with the UC was insufficient. On 6 August, Kishida announced that he would reshuffle his cabinet on 10 August, much earlier than September 2022 as had been originally scheduled, and that all members of the next cabinet would be closely examined of their ties with the church. Taro Kono, the newly appointed Minister of Digital Affairs in this reshuffle, established a "Spiritual Sales Review Committee" in the Consumer Affairs Agency to hold weekly meetings with experts in cult-related frauds, including Masaki Kito of the anti-cult lawyers network Zenkoku Benren. In a 9 December 2022 consumer committee special meeting, Kono stated that he personally recognises the Unification Church as a "cult".

On 24 October 2022, one of the retaining ministers in the reshuffled cabinet, Daishiro Yamagiwa, announced his resignation as the Minister of Economic Revitalization, after being criticised for his past engagements with the UC, announcing his ties with the UC only after the reshuffle to the public, and unsatisfactory responses regarding his participations in the UC-related events such as "I have no memory" or "I have no record" when being questioned by the media and opposition lawmakers.

==== Civil responses ====
Almost a year before the assassination, in September 2021, the anti-cult lawyers group Zenkoku Benren sent an open protest letter to Shinzo Abe, after he had sent the video message to an online meeting of the Universal Peace Federation. In the letter, the lawyers protested that his video message constituted an "endorsement", stating: "We urge you to think carefully about this for the sake of your own honour."

On 11 July 2022, in Tokyo's Chiyoda Ward lawyers of Zenkoku Benren held a press conference in response to the assassination. After offering their condolences to Abe, they objected to the UC's claims that it reformed its practices in 2009 after it came under police investigation. Hiroshi Yamaguchi, an advocacy group representative, said that the UC's "explanation that there is no coercion of donations is a lie". The amount of damages reported by victims in Japan has been higher in recent years, the lawyers said, totalling 5.1 billion yen in more than 400 cases between 2017 and 2020. They emphasised that the activities of the UC are inseparable from front groups, including the UPF, they are all part of a "religious conglomerate" working toward the goal of "unifying" the world under their church. The advocacy group released a statement urging politicians to refrain from any actions that express support for the religious group.

The Japan Federation of Bar Associations indicated that: "Neither administrative bodies or politicians in the administration did anything about the activities of the former UC in the past 30 years".

The National Family Association of Victims of the Unification Church (全国統一協会被害者家族の会), founded in 2003, received a surge of inquiries for helping their family members leave the UC. In June 2022, before the assassination, there were eight inquiries for the association; in July 2022, the number of inquiries jumped to 94; in August 2022, the number exceeded 100.

Because there were previous instances of students lured into the UC via the workers of "CARP" (for Collegiate Association for the Research of Principles), a UC-front organisation which was not acknowledged by the university, lingering around the campus, Osaka University erected warning signs on the campus to urge students to avoid cult-related groups like CARP. The signs listed the common behaviours of the workers of such group, like asking for personal contact information or taking surveys. Since 2004, Osaka University provided lectures to all first-year students about the problems with religious cults and how to deal with them on campus. Many other schools, including Waseda University, Keio University and Ritsumeikan University, warned first-year students about on-campus recruitment activities. According to World CARP Japan (WCJ), the Japanese organisation of CARP, there are about 30 CARP-circles active in universities across Japan, where they help clean up communities and teach primary school children.

==== Dissolution of the Unification Church ====
The assassination raised discussion of stripping the UC of its "legal entity of religious organization" status based on Article 81 "Dissolution Order" of the Religious Juridical Person Law which was only issued twice in Japan prior to Abe's assassination, the first being the Aum Shinrikyo in 1996 following the 1995 Tokyo subway sarin attack; the second being Myōkakuji (明覚寺) in Wakayama in January 2002 whose top officials had been convicted for employing fraudulent spiritual sales tactics to attract massive donations from their believers. The rationales being that the UC was engaging in activities which were "clearly detrimental to the public welfare" and/or "out of line with the purpose of the religious organization". Professor of constitutional law Shigeru Minamino said that stripping the religious status of an organisation does not violate the religious freedom guaranteed by the Constitution of Japan, but it would merely strip them of benefits such as tax break enjoyed by a registered religious entity. In October 2022, the leaders of the Aum Shinrikyo's succeeding unregistered religious groups, Aleph and Hikari no Wa, answered to media interviews that their religious activities had not been hindered by the government since the 1996 dissolution order.

Since Abe's assassination, a woman under the pseudonym "Sayuri Ogawa" (小川 さゆり) as one of the former UC followers, who suffered financially and mentally, has become outspoken about her past experiences of how she was exploited by the church and her own parents. On 14 September 2022, she was arranged by the Japan News Network to speak face to face with the Minister of Justice Yasuhiro Hanashi on air and demanded passing new laws to regulate the malpractices of the UC and protect children from religious parents. On 6 October 2022, she and her husband held a press conference to explain their view on the church and why they feel exploited, which was interrupted by a message sent by her parents via the UC, who accused her of lying pathologically due to her mental illness. By the end of the press conference, she demanded the dissolution of the UC in tears.

On 11 October 2022, the anti-cult lawyers group Zenkoku Benren formally submitted a request for disbanding the UC to the Prosecutor-General, Minister of Justice and Minister of Education, Culture, Sports, Science and Technology. Initially the Chief Cabinet Secretary Hirokazu Matsuno responded that the request must be considered with utmost prudence, with regards to the precedents. On 16 October 2022, Prime Minister Kishida announced a probe of the UC would be launched regarding the allegations of their anti-social activities, and suggested the possibility of dissolving the UC depending on the report of the investigation. On the next day, organisations of anti-cultism and cult victims initiated an online petition demanding government officials to strip the UC of its religious juridical person status. As of 6 December 2022, the petition has garnered over 200 thousand signatures.

Following the outcome of the probe, on 12 October 2023, the Ministry of Education, Culture, Sports, Science and Technology announced it would apply to the Tokyo District Court for an order to revoke the Unification Church's religious corporation status.

On 25 March 2025, the Tokyo District Court upheld the dissolution order, but the church immediately appealed the ruling to the Tokyo High Court. The decision was upheld by the Tokyo High Court on 4 March 2026. The church appealed to the Supreme Court of Japan, where the court upheld the High Court's ruling on 22 June 2026.

==== Legislation to restrict donations to religious organisations and provide relief to victims ====
On 10 December 2022, the House of Representatives and the House of Councillors passed two bills to restrict the activities of religious organisations such as the UC and provide relief to victims. These bills were designed to address social problems caused by the UC and the political parties and the media saw these bills as a way to restrict cults in the process leading up to the legislation.

The new law stipulates prohibited acts and duty of care for juridical persons, including religious organisations, when soliciting donations. Prohibited acts include the following: a juridical person must not induce the donor to borrow money or sell their home or fields in order to raise the funds for the donation, a juridical person must not accompany the donor to a place from which the donor is unable to leave, and a juridical person must not prevent the donor from consulting with someone. The duty of care is that the juridical person shall not suppress the free will of the soliciting subject and that the solicitation shall not make life difficult for the soliciting subject's family. If a juridical person commits a prohibited act, a correction order is issued, and a person who repeatedly violates the order is subject to imprisonment for up to one year and a fine of up to 1,000,000 yen. If a juridical person violates its duty of care, the name of the juridical person will be made public. It was also stipulated that contracts for donations or sales of goods through spiritual sales, i.e. inducing psychological fear or promising spiritual salvation, can be revoked up to 10 years after the contract is concluded and up to three years after the target of the solicitation becomes aware of the damage. In addition, it is also stipulated that donations contracted while the target of the solicitation is under brainwashing can be cancelled. The law also stipulates that the victim's family can also revoke the donation due to improper solicitation, and that the victim or his/her family can claim from the juridical person the amount of past damages as well as living expenses and child support that the child or spouse is entitled to in the future. The new law then defines spiritual sales, in which a contract can be rescinded, as soliciting donations or selling goods after taking advantage of the anxiety of the target of the solicitation or causing the target of the solicitation to become anxious. Minister of State for Consumer Affairs and Food Safety Taro Kono will have jurisdiction over these laws.

These bills were supported by the ruling Liberal Democratic Party and Komeito, and opposition parties the Constitutional Democratic Party of Japan (CDP), Nippon Ishin no Kai, and Democratic Party for the People, and opposed by the opposition parties the Japanese Communist Party (JCP) and the Reiwa Shinsengumi. The CDP had opposed the bills, seeking legislation to more strictly restrict religious organisations, but switched to support it after a clause to review the law two years later was specified in the bills. According to the CDP and some Unification Church victims, legislation to restrict religious organisations even more strictly is needed. The JCP had proposed another bill to restrict religious organisations and therefore opposed the bills. Sayuri Ogawa, who was invited to spectate the parliamentary session when the bills were being passed, was grateful for the new laws to be made in such a tight schedule of the parliament, but she also stressed that there are still many challenges ahead [surrounding the UC and its victims] with the most pressing one being passing a new bill protecting children from religious abuse; Lawyer Hiroshi Yamaguchi who represents Zenkoku Benren wished that there would have been more time to make a solid bill. He worried that under the new laws it would still be difficult to prove that the claimant's free will was being suppressed when accepting the transaction, also the definition of what allows the victim's child or spouse to demand restitution on behalf of their relative was too narrow to be practical.

==== Criticism on media integrity ====
While Japanese media outlets faced accusations of vilification from the Unification Church after the assassination, they were also criticised for their silence on the scandal before this incident. Le Figaro reported that in their initial reports about the suspect's motives, most Japanese news outlets were complicit in concealing the identity of the Unification Church, referring to it as a "specific religious organisation" (特定の宗教団体). Journalist Eito Suzuki criticised the Japanese mainstream media for failing to monitor the relationship between the church and politicians until this incident. This inability to address societal issues is being likened to the scandal involving J-pop giant Johnny Kitagawa, during which media coverage of the scandal was seen as delayed.

=== Other impacts ===
In a readers' choice of the top ten news stories of 2022 held by Yomiuri Shimbun, Abe's assassination was ranked the most important news by 24,254 verified votes, which accounted for 91.2% of the total votes.

In March 2024, the Ministry of Education, Culture, Sports, Science, and Technology of Japan announced their decision to include Abe's assassination in the "Societal History and Citizens" textbook for middle school starting in 2025.

=== Trial of Tetsuya Yamagami ===
The trial of the sole suspect in Abe's assassination, Tetsuya Yamagami, began on 28 October 2025, at the Nara District Court. During the first hearing, Yamagami pleaded guilty to the charges read by the prosecutors, saying, "It is true. There is no doubt that I did it." He was charged with murder, violations of the Firearm and Sword Possession Control Law, the Ordnance Manufacturing Law, the Explosives Control Law, and causing property damage. Yamagami's lawyers asked for any punishment to be reduced, saying that the homemade weapon he used in the assassination did not fall within the category of handguns defined by Japan's Firearms and Swords Control Act. According to Kyodo News, the trial was set to end in mid-December, and the court ruling announced on 21 January.

On 21 January 2026, he was sentenced to life in prison. The court showed no leniency, with presiding Judge Shinichi Tanaka asserting that the Unification Church's influence on Yamagami's upbringing was a remote cause and not directly linked to the assassination.

== Wake and funeral ==
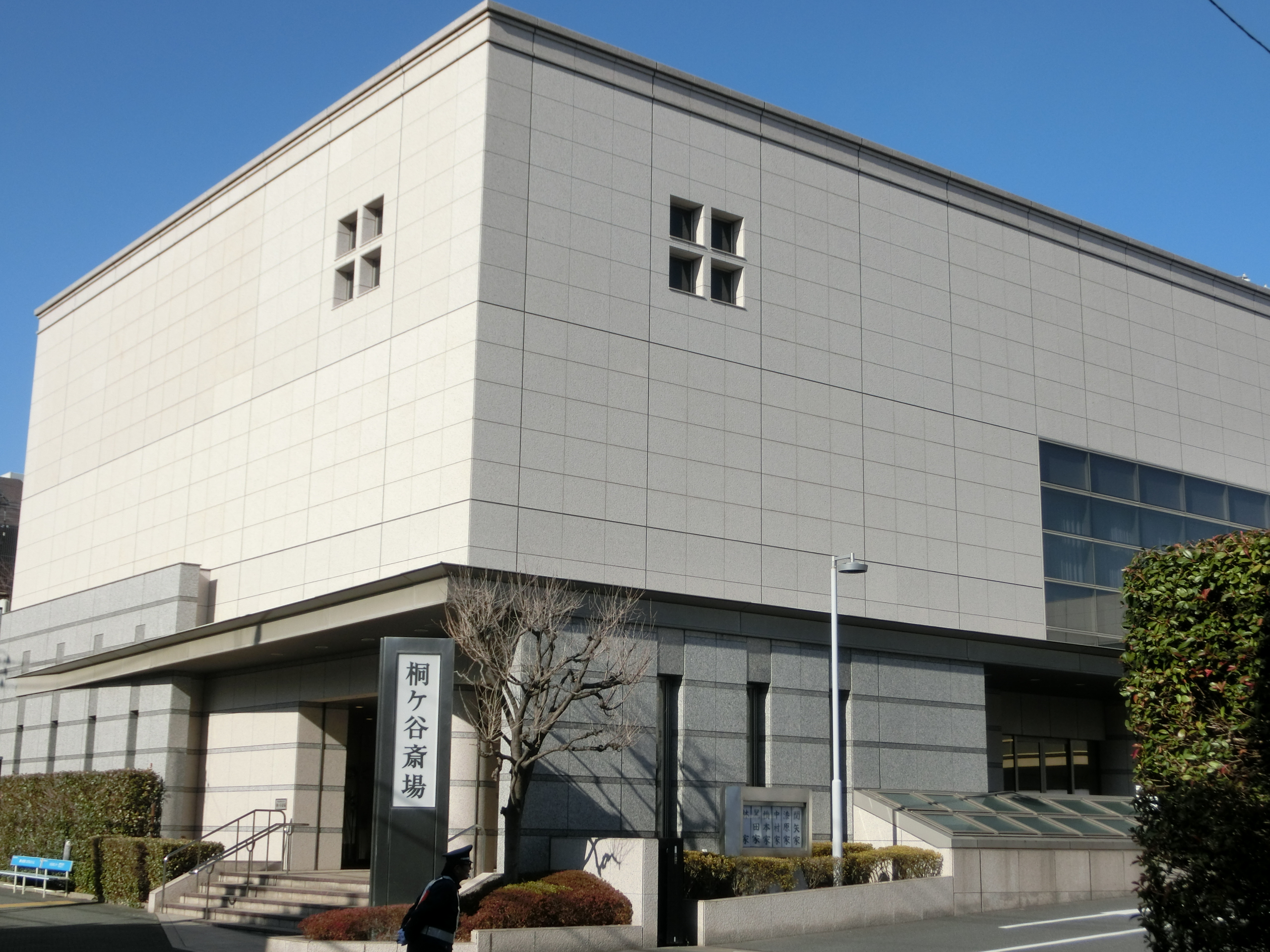
Kirigaya Funeral Hall, where Abe's funeral was held

In the afternoon of 11 July, Abe's casket was transported to the Zōjō Temple in Shiba Park of the Minato ward of Tokyo, where several feudal shoguns are buried. A wake for Abe began at 6:00 p.m. Over 2,500 people attended, according to the LDP.

A Buddhist funeral for Abe took place at Zōjō Temple on the next day. The ceremony, conducted by priests from the Jōdō-shū tradition, was restricted to Abe's family and select others from the LDP. Following the funeral, Abe's casket was transported through the Nagatachō district with large crowds watching the procession from the pavements. The casket was driven past LDP headquarters, the National Diet Building and the Prime Minister's Office before being taken to Kirigaya Funeral Hall in the Shinagawa ward for a private funeral. During the funeral, Abe received a posthumous name that was considered to reflect his political career. (Note: Shiun-in Den Sei Yo Shō Jō Shin Jū Dai Kōji (紫雲院殿政譽清浄晋寿大居士)) A farewell ceremony was planned after the funeral and the traditional 49-day mourning period. The location of the public farewell service was within the Yamaguchi 4th district and within Tokyo.

On 12 August 2022, the UPF held an international conference in Seoul which was attended by foreign dignitaries such as Mike Pompeo, Newt Gingrich, and Stephen Harper. None of the dignitaries from Japan attended. Part of the venue was dedicated to giving a memorial service for Abe. While not attending personally, former US president Donald Trump and former vice president Mike Pence's video messages were also played during the event. The event stated that Abe died while participating in a movement for peace.

=== State funeral ===
On 14 July 2022, six days after the assassination, the Kishida Cabinet formally decided a state funeral of Abe to be held on 27 September at the Nippon Budokan. The cost of the entire ceremony would be paid by the national coffer, drawn from the "annual contingency fund" which was meant for emergency situations like natural disasters. On 26 August, the cabinet approved a budget of 249.4 million yen (about US$1.8 million in August 2022) which did not include the cost of security, but in an estimation announced by the cabinet on 6 September, the grand total of the actual cost with the inclusion of security (800 million yen), hosting foreign dignitaries (600 million yen), and other miscellaneous cost (10 million yen) would be at least 1.66 billion yen. The cabinet made the decision without seeking consensus in the parliament, but attempted to convince the opposing lawmakers after they finalised the decision. Kishida insisted pushing forward the state funeral on the grounds of Abe being the longest serving prime minister of Japan, as well as his achievements on domestic affairs and foreign policies. On the other hand, Kishida reaffirmed that, similar to Yoshida's state funeral, the government would only plead with, but not mandate the public to mourn Abe during his state funeral.

There was one precedent of a state funeral for a post-war Japanese leader, Shigeru Yoshida, held in 1967 which cost 18 million yen in taxpayer funds. Originally the "State Funeral Decree" (国葬令) was enacted in 1926 by the end of the Taisho period. Articles three and five stipulated that the "prime minister shall conduct a state funeral for any one who made exceptional contribution to the country not of the imperial family under the Emperor's decree". After the Second World War, the new Constitution of Japan went into effect in 1947, and the State Funeral Decree was declared null and void. Although the state funeral for Yoshida decided by the then Prime Minister Eisaku Satō lacked any constitutional basis, by that time, only the Japanese Communist Party opposed the decision. Post-war funerals for the Emperor of Japan, while technically following the custom of a state funeral, have been known as the "Ceremony of the Imperial Funeral" since 1947.

==== Attendees ====
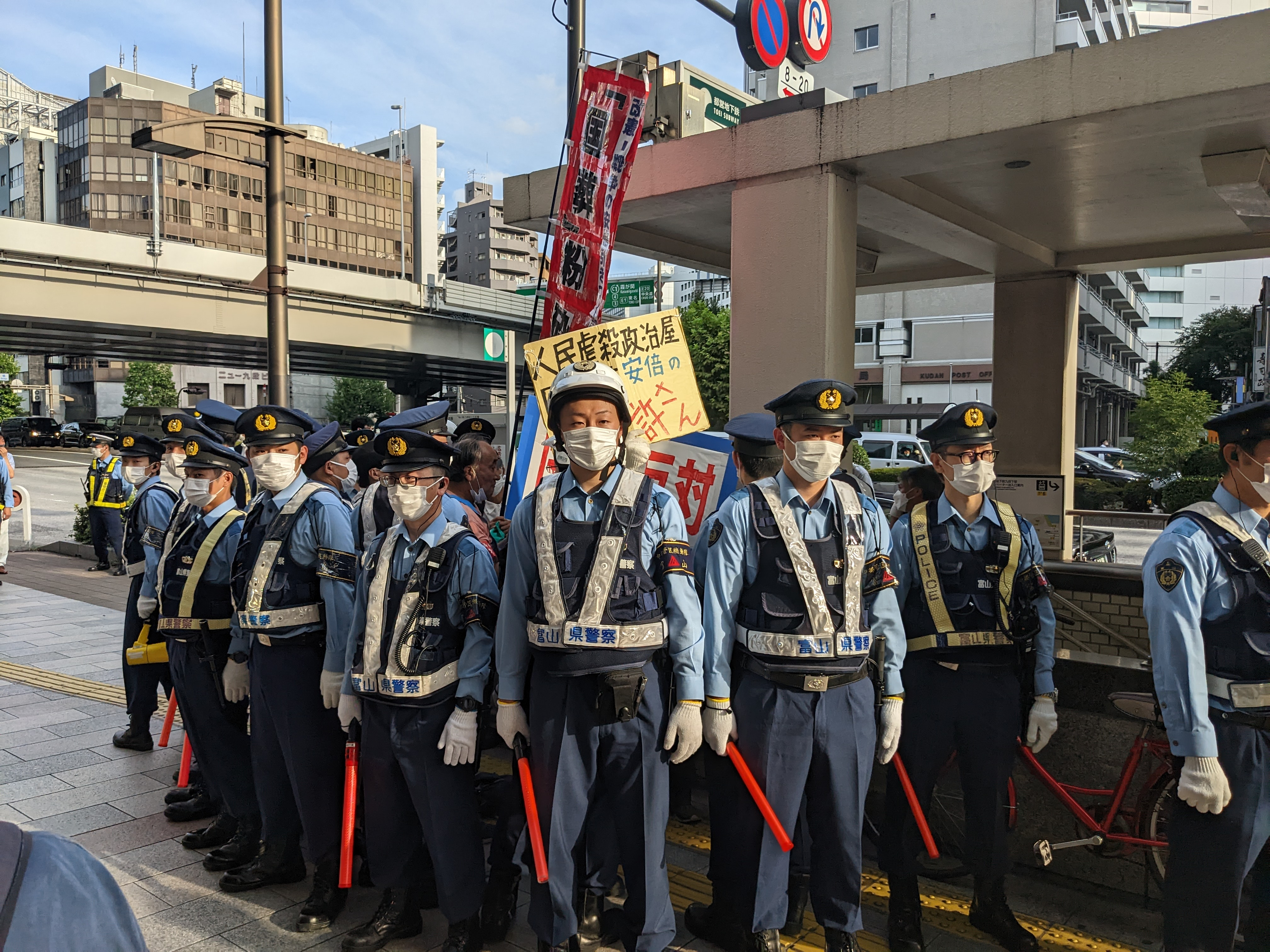
Police officers surrounding a protester during the funeral

Kishida's determination to hold Abe's state funeral was described by the media as a form of "funeral diplomacy" to convey his will to inherit Abe's legacy domestically and internationally. However, when compared to the state funeral of Elizabeth II held on 19 September, one week before Abe's state funeral, the media pointed out that the foreign dignitaries attending Abe's funeral were less influential, comprising mostly former heads of state, and none of the incumbent leaders of the G7 attended. Nippon TV cited an anonymous government official who explained that many leaders who attended Elizabeth II's funeral were unsure if it was appropriate to conduct two consecutive trips abroad in such a short period of time. All-Nippon News cited another official who commented that there were almost no notable foreign dignitaries who could attend, and that Kishida was wrong for being overly optimistic of his "funeral diplomacy" plan. Among those who received but eventually turned down invitations were Barack Obama, Donald Trump, Joe Biden, Angela Merkel, and Emmanuel Macron. Justin Trudeau cancelled his schedule three days before the funeral as Hurricane Fiona, a category 4 tropical cyclone, was causing serious damage across Atlantic Canada.

Representatives from 218 foreign countries, regions and international organisations attended the funeral, which included heads of state and government as well as ambassadors and cabinet members.

On 20 September 2022, former Japanese Prime Minister Naoto Kan stated that he would not attend Abe's state funeral. Kan's predecessor, former Prime Minister Yukio Hatoyama also did not attend Abe's state funeral.

==== Reactions to state funeral ====
Polling data of the state funeral for Shinzo Abe
Agency	Survey Date	Positive (%)	Negative (%)	Source
NHK	16–18 July	49 / 38		
Sankei & FNN	23–24 July	31.0 / 19.1 / 14.8 / 32.1		
Nikkei & TV Tokyo	29–31 July	47 / 43		
Kyodo	30–31 July	17.9 / 27.2 / 23.5 / 29.8		
NHK	5–7 Aug	36 / 50		
Yomiiuri & NNN	5–7 Aug	49 / 46		
JNN	6–7 Aug	42 / 45		
Jiji	5–8 Aug	30.5 / 47.3		
Kyodo	10–11 Aug	42.5 / 56.0		
ANN	20–21 Aug	34 / 51		
Mainichi	20–21 Aug	30 / 53		
Sankei & FNN	20–21 Aug	40.8 / 51.1		
Asahi	27–28 Aug	41 / 50		
Yomiiuri & NNN	2–4 Sep	38 / 56		
JNN	3–4 Sep	38 / 51		
NHK	9–11 Sep	32 / 57		
Asahi	10–11 Sep	38 / 56		
Jiji	9–12 Sep	25.3 / 51.9		
Nikkei & TV Tokyo	16–18 Sep	33 / 60		
ANN	17–18 Sep	30 / 54		
Kyodo	17–18 Sep	13.8 / 24.7 / 20.2 / 40.6		
Mainichi	17–18 Sep	27 / 62		
Sankei & FNN	17–18 Sep	31.5 / 62.3		
Surveys after the State Funeral
Asahi	1–2 Oct	35 / 59		
JNN	1–2 Oct	42 / 54		
Yomiuri, NNN	1–2 Oct	41 / 54		
Kyodo	8–9 Oct	13.4 / 23.5 / 23.1 / 38.8		
Jiji	7–10 Oct	24.4 / 49.5		
NHK	8–10 Oct	32.6 / 54.2		
ANN	15–16 Oct	30 / 57		
Mainichi	22–23 Oct	18 / 60		

The decision to hold a tax-funded state funeral was a radically different one from the funerals for other post-war Japanese leaders, which had been jointly organised and funded by the Cabinet and the LDP. It was met with mixed reactions, as there was no legal founding that clarified eligibility or how a state funeral should be conducted. An injunction requesting a suspension to the Cabinet's decision and budget for the event had been filed at the district courts in Tokyo, Saitama, Yokohama and Osaka by civil groups on 21 July, which stated the lack of parliamentary approval and infringement of a constitutional right to freedom of belief. All these lawsuits were dismissed by all courts on 9 September. On 12 September, the Japan Congress of Journalists (JCJ) issued an appeal letter in opposition to Abe's state funeral, citing unfavorable polling data of the state funeral across the news agencies. The letter condemned the 2015 Legislation for Peace and Security (legalisation of Japan's right to collective self-defense), one of Abe's controversial legacies during his tenure, which was described by JCJ as destroying the Constitution and peace diplomacy of Japan, but Kishida attempted to praise such a legacy via a state funeral paid by taxpayers' money. Anti-cult journalist Eito Suzuki expressed his concern that Abe's state funeral could be used by the Unification Church to lure more victims into their organisation because of Abe's overt endorsement of their leader Hak Ja Han. On 22 September, in a third press conference held by the Unification Church in response to the assassination and spiritual sales, they would announce their support for Abe's state funeral out of "tremendous respect" for Abe.

Opponents of the state funeral organised public rallies. One on 22 July, about 400 people gathered before the Prime Minister's Office. A second one on 16 August had more than a thousand people marching peacefully on the street of Shinjuku in Tokyo. A third one on 31 August organised by the opposition parties saw more than 2500 people protesting before the National Diet Building. On 19 September, two separate anti-state-funeral rallies occurred in Shibuya and Sapporo. On 21 September 2022, a man, believed to be in his 70s, set himself alight near the Prime Minister's Office, after apparently writing an anti-state funeral note.

On the day of the state funeral, about 20,000 police officers were deployed around Budokan to maintain law and order. About 3,000 opponents of the state funeral, led by opposing parties, marched from the Diet to Budokan. On their way, they clashed physically with proponents, while police officers attempted to separate the two parties outside of Budokan.

In the immediate aftermath of the shooting, many people were in favour of a state funeral, partly due to the shock. As the controversial relationships of the conservative ruling Liberal Democratic Party (LDP) and the UC were revealed in an investigation, public opinion began to voice "opposition to state funerals". Koji Nakakita, a professor of political science at Hitotsubashi University, commented on the reason for the increase in public opinion against the state funeral, saying, "The biggest problem is the issue of the former Unification Church. When the shooting occurred, some people sympathized with it as 'blasphemy against democracy'. However, the tide turned sharply when the problems of the cult came to the surface." He pointed out that Abe and others had received cooperation from the cult during the national elections, commenting, "Was the former Unification Church used to win?"

==== Memorial ====
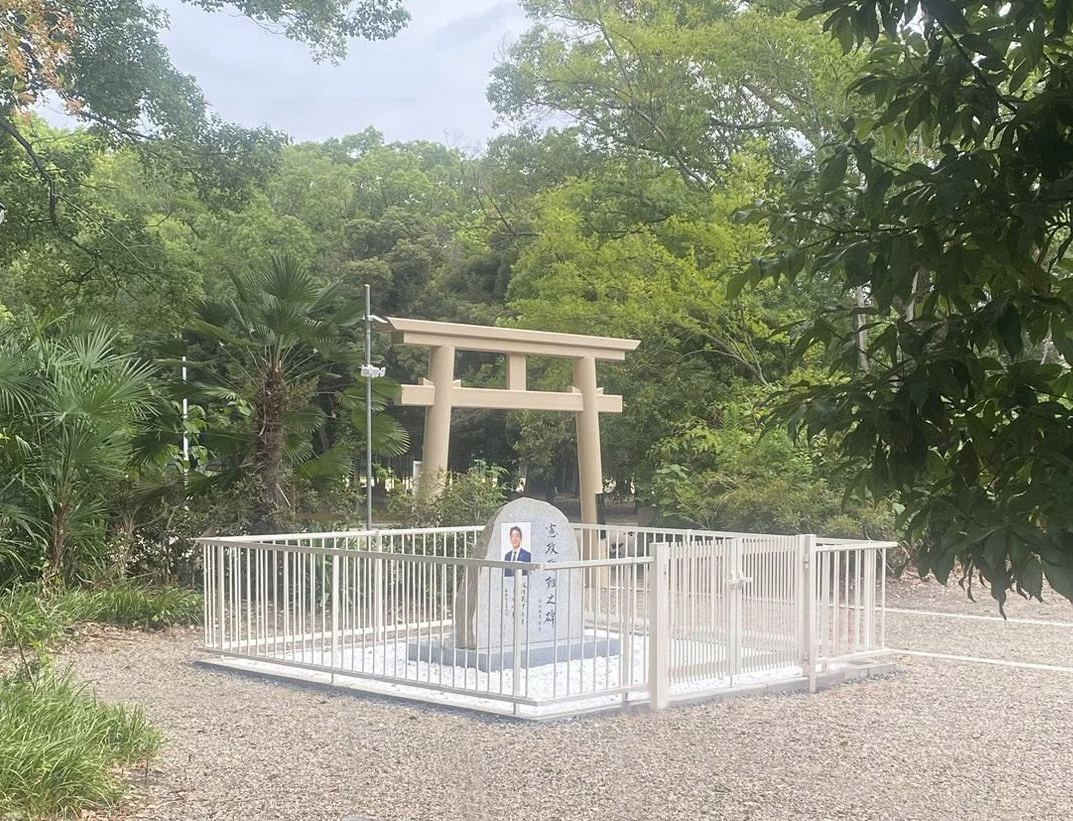
Memorial monument for Shinzo Abe at Osaka Gokoku Shrine in Osaka, Japan

In the aftermath of the assassination, the Nara City government considered erecting a monument on the site where Abe was shot. After opposition from residents, the plans were abandoned, and an unmarked flowerbed that was part of an already planned redevelopment scheme of the area now serves as a de facto memorial. The exact spot of Abe's assassination is in the middle of a newly repaved road that was opened for traffic in April 2023. A memorial monument for Shinzo Abe was established at Osaka Gokoku Shrine in Osaka, Japan (Kensei-Junnan-no-hi). The stone monument was unveiled by Akie Abe, Koutaro Takaoka (a great-great-grandson of Taisuke Itagaki), and others on 26 July 2025.

== Misinformation ==
Video capturing the surrounding area of the assassination from the sky by the television station was widely shared online by conspiracy theorists as a proof of Abe's death by sniper rifle, instead of Yamagami's homemade gun, from the roof of the nearby shopping mall Sanwa City Saidaiji. The conspiracy theory claimed that there was a white tent spotted on the roof of the mall in the video, and that tent was used as a hideout by the sniper. The management company of Sanwa City Saidaiji clarified that the tent was set up for the purpose of cleaning the ventilation ducts, and denied the possibility that it could have been used by anyone without authorisation. A comedian admitted that he was responsible for spreading this conspiracy theory online. After receiving criticism, he published an apology video on YouTube.

Several media outlets misidentified the video game developer Hideo Kojima as the assassin. The misreporting allegedly stemmed from jokes on the online message board 4chan and Twitter that were taken as fact and subsequently published by the far-right French politician Damien Rieu, the Greek news outlet ANT1, and the Iranian website Mashregh News. ANT1 additionally reported that the suspect was "passionate about Che Guevara", circulating an image of Kojima wearing a Soviet ushanka in front of a portrait of Che Guevara, while Rieu posted that same image with the caption "the far-left kill". ANT1 uploaded the broadcast to its YouTube account, but later removed it. Rieu took down the original tweet and issued an apology. Kojima's company, Kojima Productions, condemned the false reports and threatened legal action against those perpetuating the rumour. Coincidentally, Yamagami, the actual perpetrator, had a Twitter account by the handle @333_hill in reference to the video game series Silent Hill, a franchise which Kojima had prior involvement with the cancelled Silent Hills project.

Some social media users also falsely claimed that a fabricated tweet by Abe, detailing supposed information that could incriminate Hillary Clinton, led to his death. Examining the fabrication, Reuters noted that in addition to the lack of evidence that Abe's account ever made such a tweet, the Japanese text and its alleged machine translation were discordant with one another, with the former actually reading "As I mentioned before/once again, me."

== Copycat threats ==
Thirty minutes after the shooting, a threatening phone call was made to Matsuyama's office, where Abe had been initially scheduled to deliver a speech. A suspect was arrested on 9 July for making threats.

The Hyōgo prefectural police investigated a death threat and resignation demand for Akashi Mayor Fusaho Izumi, who previously served as an aide to the assassinated lawmaker Kōki Ishii.

Hours after the shooting, online assassination threats were made in Singapore and Taiwan against their respective leaders, Prime Minister Lee Hsien Loong and President Tsai Ing-wen. In Singapore, a 45-year-old man was arrested after his threats online were reported to the police. In Taiwan, the threat came from a 22-year-old man in Tainan, who was arrested at his home in Yongkang District.

Thailand additionally tightened security around its government officials and planned to increase security at the upcoming Asia-Pacific Economic Cooperation summit, due to be hosted in Bangkok on 17–18 November.

Nine months after Abe's death, on 15 April 2023, an attempted assassination of Fumio Kishida occurred and Kishida was unscathed during the incident; commentators believed that the perpetrator was inspired by Yamagami.

== Reactions ==
=== Domestic ===
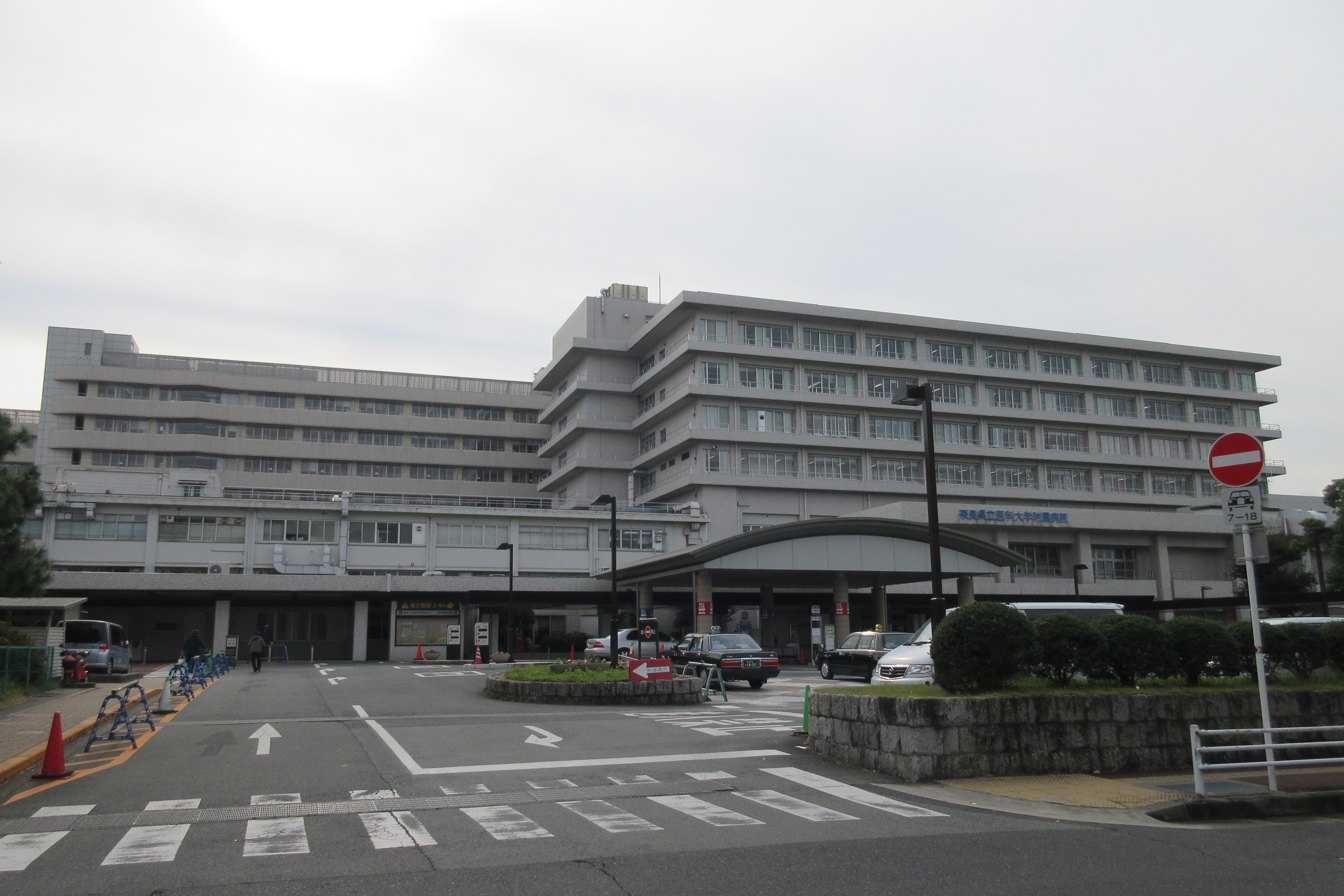
Nara Medical University Hospital, where Abe was pronounced dead

Incumbent prime minister Fumio Kishida called the assassination an "unforgivable act" and an "act of cowardly barbarism". Noting that Abe was shot while delivering a campaign speech, Kishida also denounced the assassination as an attack on Japan's democracy and vowed to defend a "free and fair election at all costs".

Before Abe's death was announced, Governor of Tokyo Yuriko Koike stated that "no matter the reason, such a heinous act is absolutely unforgivable. It is an affront against democracy." Kazuo Shii, chairman of the Japanese Communist Party, called the assassination "barbaric", an attack on free speech and an act of terrorism in a post to Twitter. Tomohiko Taniguchi, a former advisor to Abe, compared his death to the assassination of John F. Kennedy in terms of likely social impact in Japan.

Tomoaki Onizuka, head of Nara Prefecture Police, acknowledged security lapses at the political rally where Abe was killed, and pledged to identify and resolve the flaws, "It is undeniable that there were problems with the security for former prime minister Abe, and we will immediately identify the problems and take appropriate measures to resolve them".

On 11 July, Kishida's cabinet decided to award Abe Junior First Rank (Ju Ichi'i (従一位)), as well as the Collar of the Supreme Order of the Chrysanthemum and Grand Cordon of the Supreme Order of the Chrysanthemum (Dai Kun'i Kikkashō Keishoku (大勲位菊花章頸飾)) effective 8 July, making Abe the fourth former prime minister since Yasuhiro Nakasone to be conferred the Collar under the current Constitution.

=== International ===
In response to the shooting and Abe's subsequent death, representatives of numerous countries, including present and former world leaders, expressed their condolences.

Anthony Albanese, prime minister of Australia, said that Japan had emerged as "one of Australia's most like-minded partners in Asia" under Abe's leadership. Albanese also mentioned Abe's foreign policy contributions, adding that the "Quad and the Comprehensive and Progressive Agreement for Trans-Pacific Partnership are in many ways the results of his diplomatic leadership". Albanese said that Abe's legacy was "one of global impact, and a profound and positive one for Australia". Landmarks in Melbourne, Adelaide, Sydney and Perth were lit up in red and white, and flags were flown at half-mast on the day of the funeral.

National days of mourning were declared in Bangladesh, Brazil, India, Nepal, Bhutan, Cambodia, Cuba and Sri Lanka, with all countries flying their flags at half-mast. In Bangladesh, a day of state mourning was declared for 9 July. Jair Bolsonaro, president of Brazil, ordered three days of national mourning in Brazil, which is home to the world's largest population of Japanese descent outside of Japan. Narendra Modi, prime minister of India, announced that India would observe a day of national mourning on 9 July; Modi's reaction was regarded by some as an extremely personal one compared to other world leaders particularly for his addressal of the former Prime Minister as "Abe-san" on his blog where he paid tributes. Nepal and Bhutan also observed mourning on 9 July. Cambodian prime minister Hun Sen announced 10 July as a day of national mourning during which entertainment venues would be closed. Cuba observed a day of national mourning on 11 July, followed by Sri Lanka the following day. While formal mourning was not proclaimed in Thailand, the government did fly flags at half-mast on 8 July, and its prime minister Prayut Chan-o-cha paid a visit to the Japanese embassy in Bangkok to pay respects in person.

United States President Joe Biden ordered flags of the United States to be flown at half-staff until 10 July 2022, and visited the Japanese embassy to sign a condolence book. Secretary of State Antony Blinken made an unscheduled stop in Tokyo per request from President Biden, en route from the G20 summit to the US, then met with PM Kishida to offer condolences in person, and shared letters that President Biden had written to the Abe family. Secretary of the Treasury Janet Yellen cancelled an event at the Port of Yokohama during her visit to Japan, which was scheduled prior to the assassination of Abe. Yellen, alongside the Ambassador to Japan Rahm Emanuel, attended Abe's wake at Zōjō Temple on 11 July. Back in the US, members of both the Democratic and Republican parties offered tributes to Abe.

The European Council released a photo and video library in memory of Abe, featuring the former prime minister's diplomatic interactions with leaders across the EU.

Releasing a joint statement, the leaders of the Quad nations of Australia, India, and the United States noted that the organisation would redouble its work towards "a peaceful and prosperous region" in honour of Abe. The White House noted that Abe played a formative role in the founding of the Quad partnership and worked tirelessly to advance a shared vision for a free and open Indo-Pacific. In his official statement regarding the assassination, Canadian prime minister Justin Trudeau seconded the calls made by the Quad.

President of the Republic of China (Taiwan) Tsai Ing-wen announced that the nation would observe a national day of mourning on 11 July, with the flag of Taiwan flown at half-mast. Taipei 101 was also illuminated in multiple messages mourning the death of Abe. Vice President Lai Ching-te visited Abe's residence on behalf of Tsai to mourn Abe, along with Frank Hsieh, Taiwan's envoy to Japan, on 11 July. Lai became the highest-ranking Taiwanese official to visit Japan in fifty years after Japan severed its diplomatic relationship with the Republic of China in 1972 in favour of the People's Republic of China.

Israeli President Isaac Herzog paid tribute to Abe as "one of Japan's most preeminent leaders in modern times", noting that he had been "deeply impressed" by Abe's "leadership, vision and respect for Israel" during his visit to Israel in 2018. Vladimir Putin, president of Russia, described Abe in a condolence message as "an outstanding statesman" with "excellent personal and professional qualities", who did "a lot for the development of good neighborly Russian–Japanese relations".

=== Individuals, non-governmental organisations and sports ===
The University of Southern California (USC) paid special condolences to Abe, who attended the university for three semesters studying English and Public Policy during a study abroad program. USC's president Carol Folt personally sent her own condolences.

The International Olympic Committee (IOC) president, Thomas Bach, recognised Abe for being instrumental in securing the 2020 Summer Olympics for Tokyo before his tenure ended in 2020 as well as his "vision, determination and dependability" that enabled the IOC to make an unprecedented decision to postpone the Olympics by a year. The Olympic flag was flown in Lausanne at half-mast for three days.

Despite official condolences sent by the Chinese and South Korean governments, many Chinese and South Korean internet users were unsympathetic to Abe's death. This stemmed from grievances concerning historical colonialism and war crimes by Imperial Japan, and towards nationalist Japanese politicians – including Abe – who denied or questioned some accounts of the atrocities.

The assassination led to a renewed level of scrutiny of the ties between the Unification Church and the Liberal Democratic Party, with the newspaper Mainichi Shimbun running an editorial denouncing the LDP's ties to the organisation; anti-Unification Church slogans trended in Japan on social media platforms, and an online petition was launched seeking to deny Abe state honours due to his ties to the group. As of August 2022, approval for the Kishida government had fallen by 12%, and polling suggested that a majority of Japanese citizens were opposed to Abe being given a state funeral.

UN Secretary-General Antonio Guterres paid tribute to Abe, saying, "He will be remembered as a staunch defender of multilateralism, respected leader, and supporter of the United Nations."

The American magazine Time unveiled the cover of its next issue, prominently featuring Abe's portrait in black and white. This was Abe's fourth time being featured in the magazine, with Time writing Abe would be "remembered for remaking Japan".

== See also ==
- Assassination of Inejirō Asanuma
- Assassination of Itō Hirobumi
- Assassination of Yitzhak Rabin – Another assassination of a world leader described as having been successful in fulfilling the perpetrator's goals
- February 26 incident
- Crime in Japan
- List of assassinations in Japan
- Saikazaki bombing
- Shūkyō nisei
