= Tatsuya Tanimoto =

Japanese politician

- 谷本 龍哉
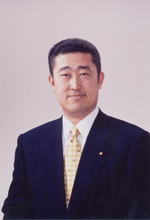
- Official portrait, 2008

Member of the House of Representatives
- In office 25 June 2000 – 21 July 2009
- Preceded by: Keisuke Nakanishi
- Succeeded by: Shūhei Kishimoto
- Constituency: Wakayama 1st

Member of the Wakayama Prefectural Assembly
- In office 1999–2000
- Constituency: Wakayama City

Personal details
- Born: 26 October 1966 (age 59) Wakayama, Japan
- Party: Liberal Democratic
- Education: University of Tokyo

Tatsuya Tanimoto (谷本 龍哉, Tanimoto Tatsuya; born 26 October 1966) is a former Japanese member of the House of Representatives of the Diet. He served as a representative of Wakayama 1st district, first as an independent politician, but after 2003 as a member of the Liberal Democratic Party. A native of Wakayama City and graduate of the University of Tokyo, he was elected for the first time in 2000 after working as a bartender and an aide to Representative Toshihiro Nikai, and serving in the Wakayama Prefectural Assembly.
