= Saikazaki =

Coordinates: 34°11′24″N 135°08′36″E

Saikazaki (雑賀崎, Saika-Zaki) is a cape in the southern part of Wakayama, Wakayama Prefecture, and is a specially designated region by Setonaikai National Park.

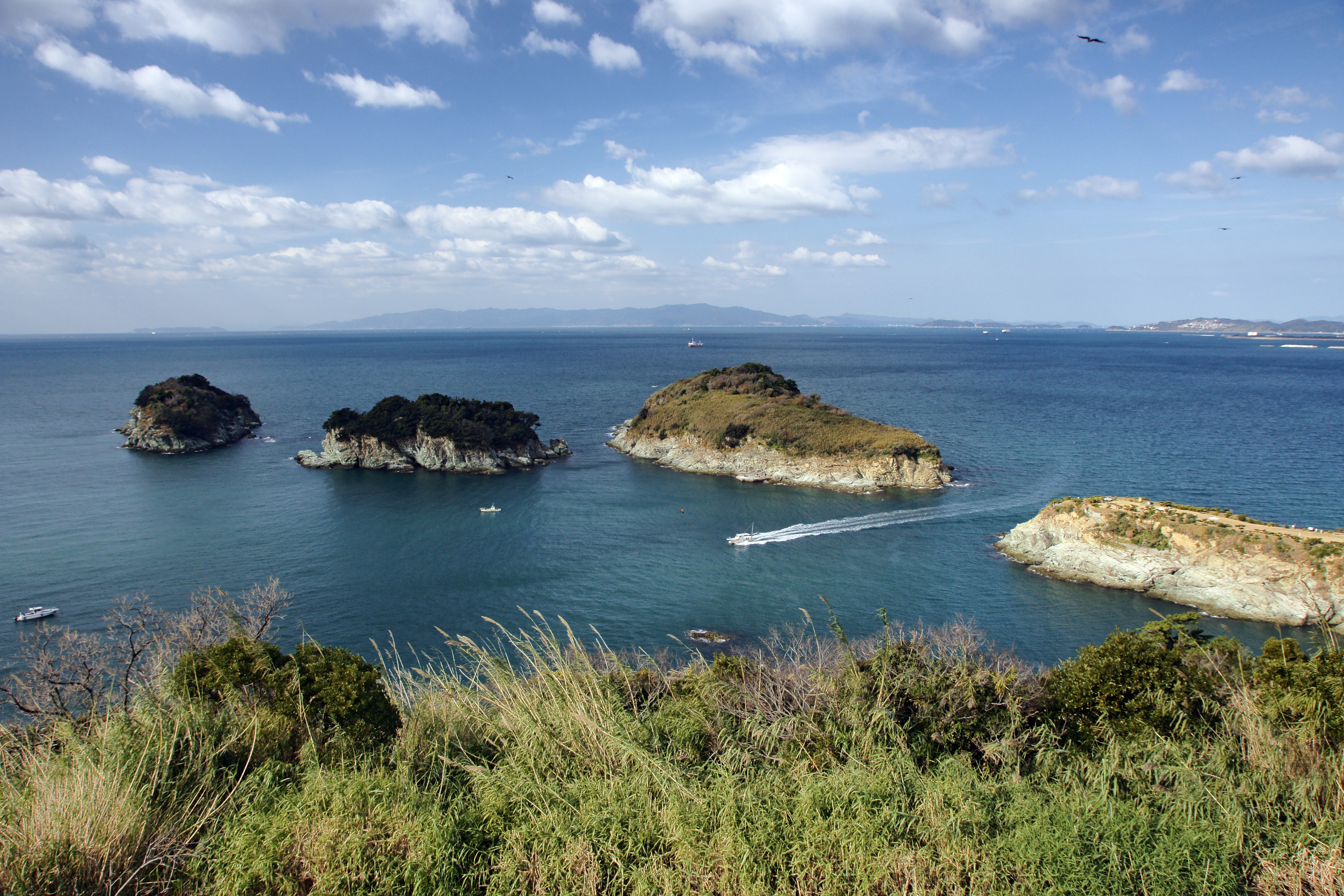
The view from Saikazaki Lighthouse "Hawk's Nest"

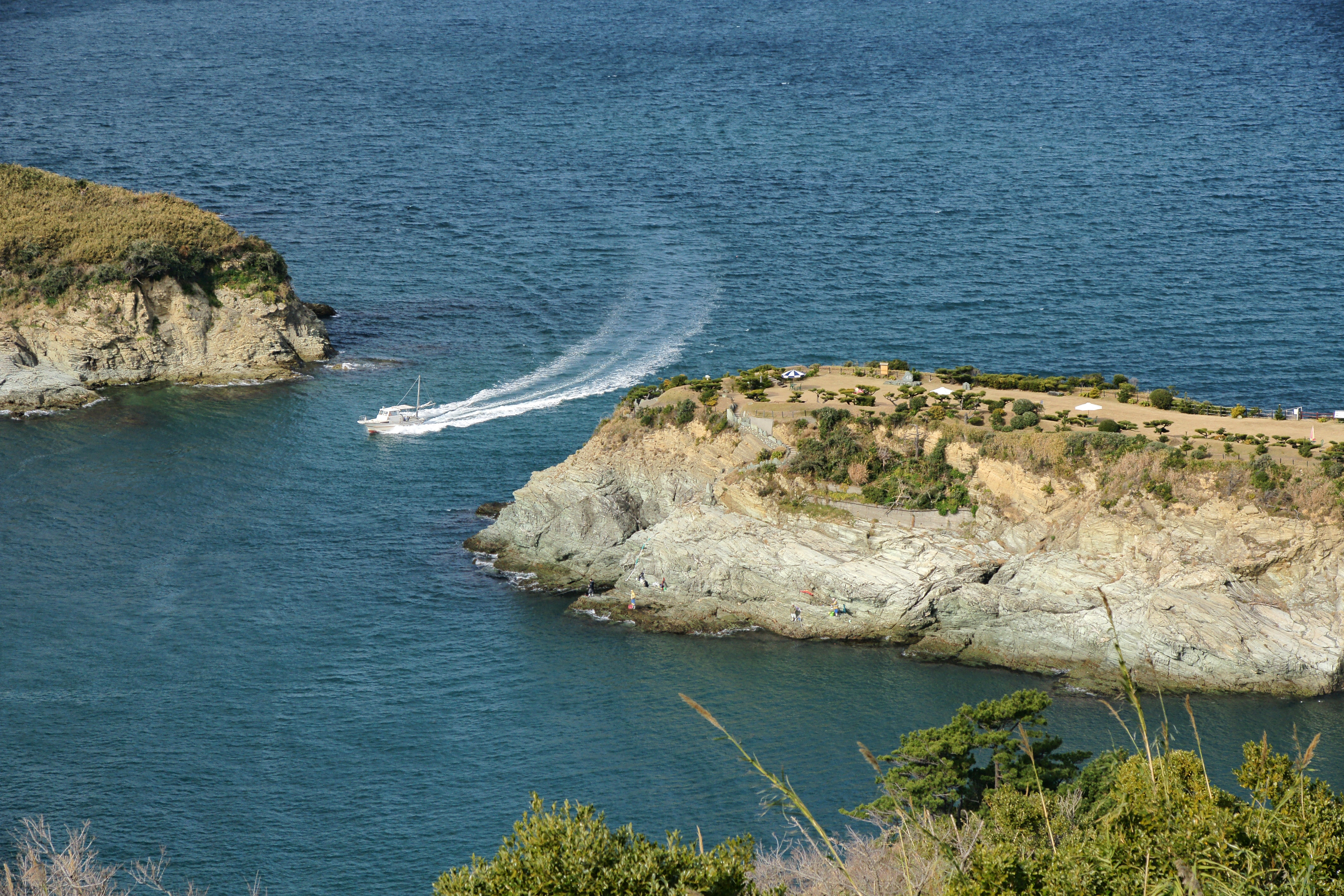
Bandokonohana

== Background ==
Saikazaki, also known as "Oku-Wakaura," is a part of the Wakaura region that lies in the south-west part of Wakayama City. The Wakaura region, which has been known for its beauty since ancient times, and was even rated number one in the New Japanese Tourist Spot Top 100 Contest of 1950, has lost much of its natural allure due to development beginning in the 1970s. The Saikazaki area is home to the only natural coastline remaining in the region.

During the Sengoku period, Saikazaki was known as the headquarters of the Saiga Ikki, led by Suzuki Magoichi, better known as Saiga Magoichi. Lying on the bank of the Kii Channel, an important trade route, it is possible to see Tomogashima, Awaji Island, and Shikoku from the Saikazaki Lighthouse resting on the top of a bluff known as the "Hawk's Nest." During the Edo period, a small peninsula called Bandoko no Hana, or the nose of Bandoko, served as a lookout post for the Kishu Domain.

== Geography and Landmarks ==
- Saikazaki Lighthouse - A lighthouse resting on top of a bluff known as the "Hawk's Nest". The lighthouse has good view of Kii Channel, Bandoko no Hana, Oojima Island, Nakanoshima Island, and the Futagojima Islands.
- Bandoko Garden - A Japanese garden on the Bandoko no Hana Peninsula

== See also ==
- Saikazaki Castle
