= Wakayama 1st district =

Electoral district in Wakayama, Japan

Wakayama 1st District
- Parliamentary constituency for the Japanese House of Representatives
- Numbered map of Wakayama Prefecture single-member districts
- Prefecture: Wakayama
- Proportional District: Kinki
- Electorate: 403,217

Current constituency
- Created: 1994
- Seats: One
- Party: LDP
- Representative: Daichi Yamamoto
- Municipalities: Wakayama, Kinokawa, Iwade

Wakayama 1st district (和歌山県第1区, Wakayama-ken dai-ikku) is an electoral district in the Japanese House of Representatives.

Representative Shuhei Kishimoto resigned on 1 September 2022 to successfully run for office as governor of Wakayama Prefecture. Yumi Hayashi, member of the Nippon Ishin no Kai, won the seat in a special election in April 2023. She narrowly lost the seat in the 2024 election to former Wakayama City council member Daichi Yamamoto by only 124 votes. Hayashi carried Wakayama City with more than 2000 votes, but Yamamoto managed to make up the difference with support in the more rural area of Kinokawa and Iwade that had recently been added to the district.

== Area ==
The first constituency of Wakayama Prefecture covers the cities of Wakayama, Kinokawa and Iwade. Before reapportionment in 2022, it consisted only of Wakayama city.

== List of representatives ==
Election	Representative	Party	Notes
1996	Keisuke Nakanishi	New Frontier	
2000	Tatsuya Tanimoto	Independent	
2003	Tatsuya Tanimoto	Liberal Democratic	
2005	Tatsuya Tanimoto	Liberal Democratic	
2009	Shuhei Kishimoto	Democratic	Resigned to run for office as governor
2012	Shuhei Kishimoto	Democratic	Resigned to run for office as governor
2014	Shuhei Kishimoto	Democratic	Resigned to run for office as governor
2017	Shuhei Kishimoto	Kibō no Tō	Resigned to run for office as governor
2021	Shuhei Kishimoto	DPFP	Resigned to run for office as governor
2021	Vacant (September 2022–April 2023)		
2023 by-el	Yumi Hayashi	Innovation	
2024	Daichi Yamamoto	LDP	
2026	Daichi Yamamoto	LDP	

== Election results ==
2026
Party	Candidate	Votes	%	±%
LDP	Daichi Yamamoto	95,836	46.2	▲10.0
DPP	Yumi Hayashi	31,352	15.1	
Centrist Reform	Yukiko Kaname	30,208	14.6	
Sanseitō	Masako Hayashimoto	20,292	9.8	▲2.9
Ishin	Yoshihiro Urahira	19,067	9.2	▼27.0
JCP	Hisashi Mae	9,677	4.7	▼2.3
Minor Party	Takeshi Shōji	795	0.4	
Turnout			53.78	▲2.51
LDP hold				

2024
Party	Candidate	Votes	%	±%
LDP	Daichi Yamamoto	70,869	36.2	▼6.6
Ishin	Yumi Hayashi (elected by PR)	70,745	36.2	▼11.3
CDP	Noriatsu Murakami	25,067	12.8	
JCP	Yūichi Imoto	13,665	7.0	▼1.6
Sanseitō	Masataka Hayashimoto	13,422	6.9	
Minor Party	Takeshi Shōji	1,749	0.9	
Turnout			51.27	▲7.16
LDP gain from Ishin				

2023 by-election
Party	Candidate	Votes	%	±%
Innovation	Yumi Hayashi	61,720	47.47	New
Liberal Democratic	Hirofumi Kado	55,657	42.80	▲5.53
Communist	Hideaki Kunishige	11,178	8.60	▼1.38
Seijika Joshi	Takahira Yamamoto	1,476	1.14	New
Registered electors		304,221		
Turnout			44.11	▼11.05
Ishin gain from DPP				

2021
Party	Candidate	Votes	%	±%
DPFP	Shuhei Kishimoto (Incumbent)	103,676	62.73	New
Liberal Democratic	Hirofumi Kado (Incumbent-Kinki PR block)	61,608	37.27	▼2.39
Registered electors		307,817		
Turnout			55.16	▲7.89
DPP hold				

2017
Party	Candidate	Votes	%	±%
Kibō no Tō	Shuhei Kishimoto (Incumbent)	72,517	50.36	New
Liberal Democratic	Hirofumi Kado (Incumbent-Kinki PR block) (reelected by Kinki PR block)	57,111	39.66	▼2.64
Communist	Yasuhisa Hara	14,372	9.98	▲0.08
Registered electors		312,819		
Turnout			47.27	▲0.45
Kibō no Tō hold				

2014
Party	Candidate	Votes	%	±%
Democratic	Shuhei Kishimoto (Incumbent)	67,740	47.80	▲12.85
Liberal Democratic	Hirofumi Kado (Incumbent-Kinki PR block) (reelected by Kinki PR block)	59,937	42.30	▲7.53
Communist	Hideaki Kunishige	14,027	9.90	▲2.35
Registered electors		309,449		
Turnout			46.82	▼10.44
Democratic hold				

2012
Party	Candidate	Votes	%	±%
Democratic	Shuhei Kishimoto (Incumbent)	60,577	34.95	▼23.20
Liberal Democratic	Hirofumi Kado (elected by Kinki PR block)	60,277	34.77	▼0.08
Restoration	Jun Hayashi	39,395	22.73	New
Communist	Hideaki Kunishige	13,094	7.55	▲1.49
Registered electors		311,046		
Turnout			57.26	▼10.05
Democratic hold				

2009
Party	Candidate	Votes	%	±%
Democratic	Shuhei Kishimoto	120,309	58.15	▲18.42
Liberal Democratic	Tatsuya Tanimoto (Incumbent)	72,109	34.85	▼16.12
Communist	Hideaki Kunishige	12,529	6.06	▼3.25
Happiness Realization	Masahiro Saitō	1,956	0.95	New
Registered electors		313,226		
Turnout			67.31	▲2.79
Democratic gain from LDP				

2005
Party	Candidate	Votes	%	±%
Liberal Democratic	Tatsuya Tanimoto (Incumbent)	100,868	50.97	▼17.93
Democratic	Shuhei Kishimoto	78,621	39.73	New
Communist	Tsutomu Shimokado	18,418	9.31	▼21.79
Registered electors		314,432		
Turnout			64.52	▲13.35
LDP hold				

2003
Party	Candidate	Votes	%	±%
Liberal Democratic	Tatsuya Tanimoto (Incumbent)	101,602	68.90	▲50.09
Communist	Tsutomu Shimokado	45,851	31.10	▲12.60
Registered electors		314,436		
Turnout			51.17	▼9.50
LDP hold				

2000
Party	Candidate	Votes	%	±%
Independent	Tatsuya Tanimoto	83,830	45.76	New
New Conservative	Keisuke Nakanishi (Incumbent)	65,468	35.74	New
Communist	Yasuhisa Hara	33,899	18.50	▲5.00
Registered electors		315,298		
Turnout			60.67	▲0.08
Independent gain from New Conservative				

1996
Party	Candidate	Votes	%	±%
New Frontier	Keisuke Nakanishi	66,428	35.85	New
Independent	Takusō Tabita	58,119	31.37	New
Liberal Democratic	Chikara Azuma	34,851	18.81	New
Communist	Akiharu Okumura	25,016	13.50	New
Independent	Masako Tabata	872	0.47	New
Registered electors		313,750		
Turnout			60.59	
