= Security Police (Japan) =

Bodyguard unit in the Tokyo Metropolitan Police Department

- Active: 13 September 1975 – present
- Country: Japan
- Agency: Tokyo Metropolitan Police Department
- Type: Protective security unit
- Role: Bodyguard
- Part of: Security Bureau
- Headquarters: Tokyo, Japan
- Common name: Security Police
- Abbreviation: SP

The Security Police is the protective security unit of the Tokyo Metropolitan Police Department (TMPD). Under the Security Bureau of the TMPD, the division is responsible for VIP protection in and outside Japan concerning Japanese politicians.

The division's agents are commonly known as Security Police (SP) (セキュリティポリス, Sekyuritī Porisu). The word "SP" is a loanword used in the Japanese law enforcement system, based on the badge worn by the agents.

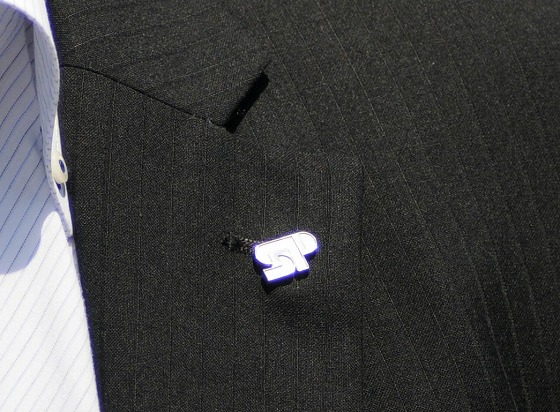
The SP insignia on a SP officer's business suit

The division does not protect the Imperial Family as they have their own dedicated division, the Imperial Protection Division.

== History ==
After an assassination attempt against then–US Ambassador to Japan Edwin O. Reischauer in 1964, the chairman of the National Public Safety Commission was pressured to resign.

In 1975, the unit was established following an incident in which Prime Minister Takeo Miki was attacked and beaten, sustaining injuries, by the Secretary-General of the Greater Japan Patriotic Party, a far-right political group, whilst he was at the venue of the state funeral of former Prime Minister Eisaku Sato, in the Nippon Budokan in Tokyo. Until that time, protection was carried out by staying as inconspicuous as possible whilst remaining close to dignitaries, however, SPs were created to make their presence visible in order to deter attacks.

That decision was made due to the previous year in 1974, when US President Gerald Ford visited Japan, the protection methods of the Secret Service (USSS) left a strong impression on senior officials of the Tokyo Metropolitan Police Department Security Division. The Secret Service conducted protection in a rational and conspicuous manner, such as forming a tight ring around the president and unfastening suit jacket buttons so that handguns could be drawn quickly. This led to the National Police Agency, ordering the formation of the division on September 13, 1975.

The Security Police were trained with reference to the Secret Service. The abbreviation “SP” was modeled after the Secret Service abbreviation “SS”.

The unit celebrated its 40th anniversary in 2015.

On April 15, 2023, SP officers in the Saikazaki bombing incident were able to quickly move Fumio Kishida after a pipebomb was thrown near him.

=== Scandals ===
On November 11, 2021, an SP officer was arrested for allegedly breaking into a women's-only condominium building.

== Duties ==
The specialized duty of SPs is close personal protection of individuals designated by law as protectees, such as the leaders of political parties holding seats in the National Diet and VIPS visiting Japan from other countries, from the moment they leave their residence until they return home. Criminal investigation, community patrols, and traffic enforcement are outside the scope of their duties.

In addition to the Tokyo Metropolitan Police Department, other prefectural police headquarters also have protection divisions of their own. For example, the Osaka Prefectural Police and Kyoto Prefectural Police have Guard and Protection Divisions, while the Kanagawa Prefectural Police and others assign protection duties to their own Public Security Divisions.

For example, when the Prime Minister travels from Tokyo to regional areas for inspections or similar purposes, close protection is handled by the First Protection Section of the Metropolitan Police Department, while convoy protection and rear-area support other than close protection are handled by the local prefectural police's protection division. If manpower is still insufficient, assistance is requested from the Riot Police Unit or other departments; however, such supporting units are assigned to rear-area support roles.

Regarding close personal protection of the Emperor of Japan and members of the Imperial Family this is carried out exclusively by the separate Imperial Guard who are dedicated to escort and protection duties to the royals, and belong to the Imperial Guard Headquarters, an affiliated agency of the National Police Agency. Although the Metropolitan Police Department Security Bureau also has a Guard Division, it is responsible only for perimeter security and does not conduct close personal protection.

The Guard Division of the Metropolitan Police Department Security Bureau and police officers from other police headquarters provide rear-area support to Imperial Guard officers during regional public engagements. During imperial visits (“Gyokō-kei”) or imperial appearances (“Onari”), it is customary for the Commissioner General of the Metropolitan Police Department and prefectural police chiefs to accompany the procession in uniform while carrying sidearms.

The division provides close protection duties for the following people:

1. Prime Minister of Japan
2. Ministers of State
3. Chief Justice of the Supreme Court of Japan
4. President of the House of Councillors
5. Speaker of the House of Representatives
6. Governor of Tokyo
7. Foreign VIPs such as heads of state, ambassadors, etc.
8. Major political party leaders
9. Other VIPs designated by the Commissioner General of the National Police Agency

Although it is not mandated, the division also protects the Vice Speaker of the House of Representatives and the Vice President of the House of Councillors.

Former prime ministers also receive SP protection. This is provided at the discretion of the National Police Agency.

== Organization ==
The division is structured in the following way:

- Director
  - Department Chief
  - General Clerk
    - Section 1
      - Mobile Security Squad
    - Section 2
      - Mobile Security Squad
    - Section 3
      - Mobile Security Squad
    - Section 4
      - Mobile Security Squad

Section 1 is mandated to protect the Prime Minister of Japan. Section 2 protects Ministers of States, the President of the House of Councillors, and the Speaker of the House of Representatives. Section 3 is known to conduct duties on guarding foreign VIPs such as ambassadors and heads of state while Section 4 are to protect the Chief Justice of Japan, the Governor of Tokyo, and others qualified for protection such as the Vice President of the House of Councillors, the Vice Speaker of the House of Representatives, and party leaders.

In operations where SPs are deployed to other cities/towns in Japan and overseas, SP officers usually liaise with the local police in order to set up security for an incoming VIP or to scout potential locations where the VIP may visit.

== Requirements and Qualifications ==
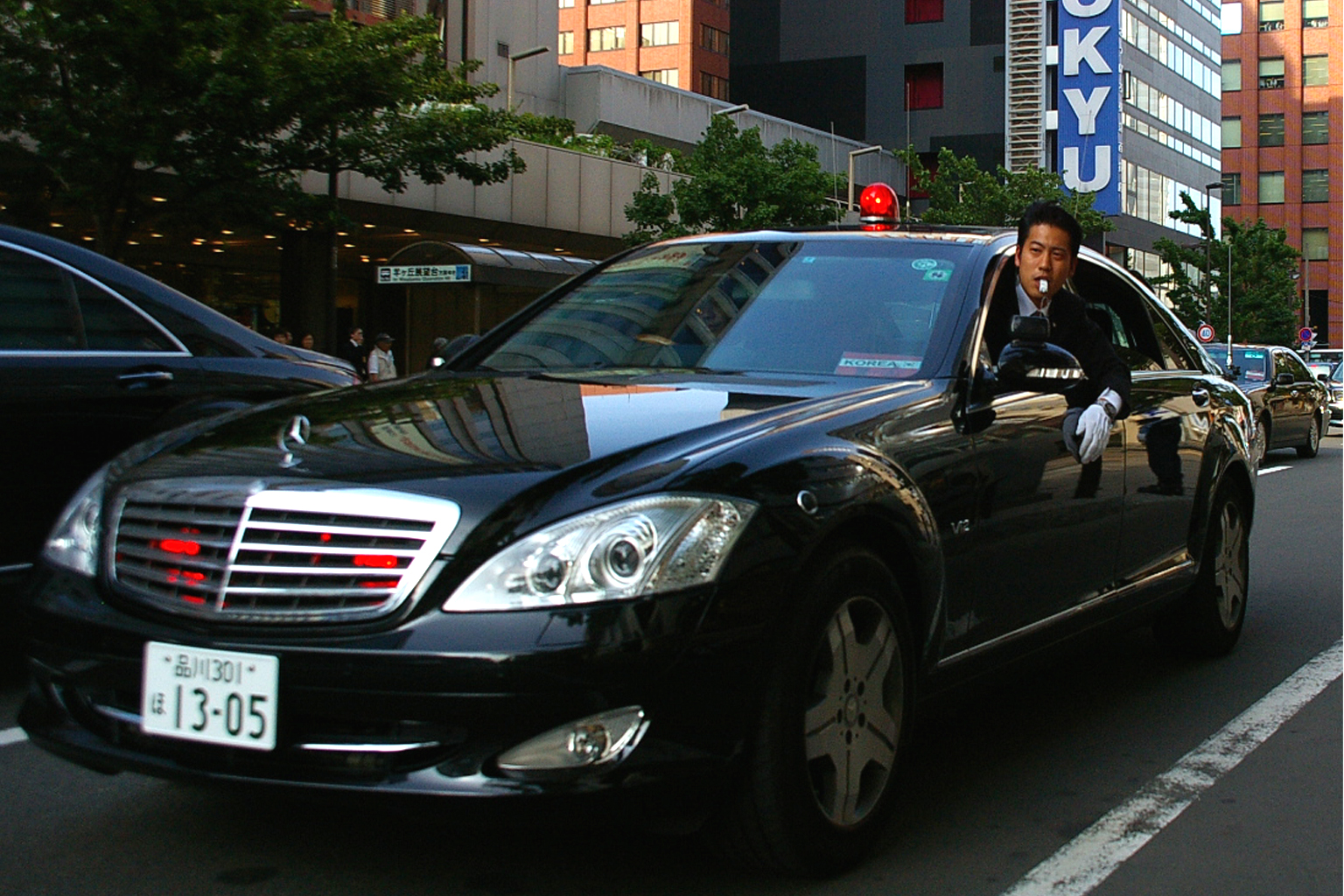
Security Police officer in a Mercedes-Benz S600 during escort duty at the 34th G8 summit in Tōyako, Hokkaidō

To become part of the SP unit is a rigorous process, it is a mandatory requirement that the individual be a police officer with a number of years of experience, who satisfies conditions, such as being a minimum of 173 cm (5’8). Holding a minimum 3rd dan rank or higher in one the arts of either judo, kendo, or aikido, possessing advanced marksmanship, and being capable of conversational English, among other criteria. Applicants also require receiving recommendations, from their superiors or department heads. After meeting these requirements, applicants become candidates and undergo three months of special training at police academies or other facilities. The selection course is said to be challenging and competitive, having a high attrition rate, with only a select few who pass and are appointed as SPs.

At the Prime Minister's Official Residence, police officers who specialize in security (the Prime Minister's Official Residence Security Unit) are assigned; however, they are responsible solely for guarding the facility itself, which is completely different from the close personal protection carried out by SPs. The division responsible for protecting the Prime Minister as SPs, known as the First Protection Section, and the Prime Minister's Official Residence Security Unit both belong to the Protection Division, Security Department of the Metropolitan Police Department, and personnel exchanges occur between them. As a result, there are cases in which SPs are selected from among members of the Official Residence Security Unit.

SPs are required to possess skilled arrest and self-defense techniques, and shooting proficiency (specifically, the ability to hit a 10-centimeter-diameter target at a distance of 25 meters, firing a handgun with at least 5 shots within 10 seconds—generally, Japanese police handguns are 9mm caliber with 6 rounds, meaning all rounds must hit the target within the time limit). In addition, they are vetted to must have strong physical and mental strength, constantly maintaining hypervigilance in order to detect suspicious individuals before they do.

They are also expected to demonstrate patrol car driving techniques, cooperativeness with colleagues, self-restraint, self-management ability, a strong spirit of legal compliance, and proper etiquette when dealing with VIPs. Furthermore, if placed in an extreme situation, they must be prepared to launch themselves bodily into the path of a weapon or gun barrel wielded by a perpetrator, essentially becoming a human shield. In other words, the profession demands a spirit of self-sacrifice. For this reason, among police officers, only those who meet these stringent conditions are appointed as SPs. Female police officers can also qualify to join the division if they meet the standards.

== Equipment ==
Officers are mostly armed with handguns and expandable batons during their duties. A mini flashlight and a transceiver is also in their list of equipment. Sometimes they use unmarked cars for transport and escort. They have used the Mercedes-Benz S600, Toyota Crown, Nissan Teana, Nissan Elgrand, and Toyota HiAce.

Officers mostly carry the NPA-issued Smith & Wesson Model 37 revolver, or the SIG P230 semi-automatic pistol. Officers can also be seen armed with pistols such as the Beretta 92, Glock 17 or Heckler & Koch P2000.

== Notes ==
1. Each of these sections are led by a Section Chief.

== Bibliography ==
- Ames, Walter (2004). "Confronting Youth". Police and Community in Japan. University of California Press.
