= Shūhei Kishimoto =

Japanese politician (1956–2025)

- 岸本 周平
- Official portrait, 2024

Governor of Wakayama Prefecture
- In office 17 December 2022 – 15 April 2025
- Monarch: Naruhito
- Preceded by: Yoshinobu Nisaka
- Succeeded by: Izumi Miyazaki

Member of the House of Representatives
- In office 31 August 2009 – 1 September 2022
- Preceded by: Tatsuya Tanimoto
- Succeeded by: Yumi Hayashi
- Constituency: Wakayama 1st

Personal details
- Born: 12 July 1956 Wakayama, Japan
- Died: 15 April 2025 (aged 68) Wakayama, Japan
- Party: Independent (2022–2025)
- Other political affiliations: DPJ (2009–2016); DP (2016–2017); KnT (2017–2018); DPP (2018–2022)
- Spouse: Kaori Iida
- Education: University of Tokyo (LLB)

Shūhei Kishimoto (岸本周平, Kishimoto Shūhei; 12 July 1956 – 15 April 2025) was a Japanese politician who served as governor of Wakayama Prefecture from 2022 until his death in 2025. He was previously a member of House of Representatives from 2009 and 2022, being elected five times from Wakayama 1st district.

Born in Wakayama and educated at the University of Tokyo, Kishimoto worked at the Ministry of Finance and Toyota before entering politics in 2009.

== Life and career ==
Born in Wakayama City, Kishimoto graduated from the University of Tokyo and joined the Ministry of Finance. After rising to serve as chief of the national treasury division in the Financial Bureau, Kishimoto retired from the Ministry and joined the Toyota Motor Corporation.

Kishimoto was first elected to the House of Representatives in 2009 as a candidate for the Democratic Party of Japan from Wakayama 1st district. While the DPJ was in power, Kishimoto served as parliamentary secretary for economy, trade and industry.

Kishimoto later became the Democratic Party For the People's acting secretary-general, but left in 2022 to successfully run for governor of Wakayama Prefecture as an independent candidate, with the endorsement of his former party as well as the Liberal Democratic Party, and the Constitutional Democratic Party of Japan. As governor, Kishimoto embarked on fiscal reconstruction policies and disaster prevention measures in the event of a major earthquake on the Nankai Trough.

Kishimoto also previously taught at Princeton University and wrote a book about his experiences in the United States titled Chunen Eigo-gumi: Princeton Daigaku no Niwaka Kyoju (Middle-aged English group: Suddenly a professor at Princeton University). He also held a black belt in judo.

=== Death ===
Kishimoto was found unconscious by a secretary at his official residence on 14 April 2025, a day after attending an opening ceremony at Expo 2025 in Osaka. He was taken to the Japanese Red Cross Wakayama Medical Center, where he died on 15 April, at the age of 68. He is the first Japanese incumbent governor to have died in office after Takeshi Onaga, then-governor of Okinawa Prefecture, who died in 2018. He was succeeded on a temporary basis by his deputy, Izumi Miyazaki. Miyazaki was later elected in his own right.
