= Yumi Hayashi =

Japanese politician (born 1981)

- 林 佑美
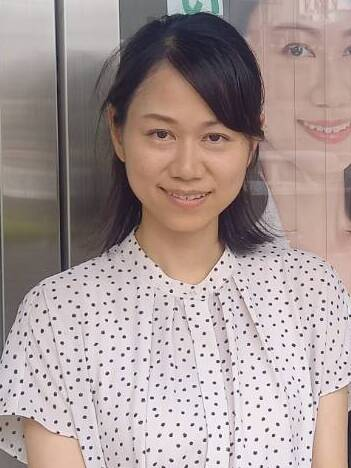
- Hayashi in 2023

Member of the House of Representatives
- In office 25 April 2023 – 23 January 2026
- Preceded by: Shūhei Kishimoto
- Succeeded by: Multi-member district
- Constituency: Wakayama 1st (2023–2024); Kinki PR (2024–2026)

Member of the Wakayama City Council
- In office 2022–2023

Personal details
- Born: 12 May 1981 (age 45) Kyoto, Japan
- Party: DPP (since 2025)
- Other political affiliations: JIP (before 2025)
- Education: Ritsumeikan University

Yumi Hayashi (born 12 May 1981; Japanese 林佑美) is a Japanese politician. In April 2023, she was elected to the House of Representatives in a by-election in Wakayama 1st district.
