= Hadaka no Shounen =

Japanese television series

Hadaka no Shounen (裸の少年) is a Japanese TV Asahi cooking program. It airs every week on Saturday.

== Airing ==
- First Period (0:30–1:00): April 7, 2001 – December 2003
- First Period (17:00–17:30): January 17, 2004 – September 26, 2009
- Second Period (10:30–11:10): June 9, 2018 – September 28, 2019
- Second Period (16:00–16:30): October 19, 2019 – November 4, 2023

== History ==
It started out on April 7, 2001, as a Johnny's late-night show in which the Juniors were in their pajamas in a 'club house'. The program was aimed at teenage girls, so it looked like a sleep over. The Juniors discussed various topics, including trips. These were shown in flashback, as they went around the city, learning different skills such as Ballroom dancing, or Jump rope. There were also competitions. Yearly there was a swimming competition between two teams. The show almost always ended with a song. Sometimes there were visits from older Juniors such as Tackey or the Kansai Juniors, such as Ryo Nishikido. Members such as Shunsuke Kazama, Jun Hasegawa, Jimmy Mackey and KAT-TUN were main Juniors in this version.

However, on January 17, 2004, the program underwent a renewal. Because the gourmet segments on the earlier version had been very popular the program was changed to a gourmet show. At the same time it was moved to the spot on Saturday, 5 pm.

In response to the Johnny Kitagawa sexual abuse scandal that was discovered in 2023, TV Asahi announced at the president's regular press conference on October 31 that the program would be cancelled on November 4.

== Show ==
Main theme for the show is food, but unlike many food shows on Japanese TV the only time cooking comes into the view is the end segment when one recipe is shown. The rest of the time Seven Sages with two guests visit restaurants and small cafes, tasting food and recommending places to the viewers.

Every food they taste is given a price tag and every place is shown on the map. All the places visited in the episode are listed in the end of the show, complete with addresses and phone numbers, and then added to the list on the site, along with featured recipe.

== Seven sages ==
Seven famous cooks and food critics who take turns leading the show are called Seven food sages (食の七賢人, shoku no shichikenjin).

They are:

Asako Kishi (岸朝子, Kishi Asako)
Shin'ya Tasaki (田崎真也, Tasaki Shin'ya), born on March 21, 1958
Ken'ichi Chin (陳建一, Chin Ken'ichi)
Yoshiharu Dou (土井善晴, Dō Yoshiharu), born on February 8, 1957
Yukio Hattori (服部幸應, Hattori Yukio)
Remi Hirano (平野レミ, Hirano Remi), born on March 21, 1947
Rokusaburo Michiba (道場六三郎, Michiba Rokusaburō)

=== Guest sages ===
Minoru Sano (佐野実, Sano Minoru)
Yuichi Kimura (木村祐一, Kimura Yūichi)
Hirayuki Amano (天野ひろゆき, Amano Hiroyuki)

== Regulars ==
=== First Period ===
Every episode two boys from Johnny's Jimusho join the sage of the day.

=== Second Period ===
- HiHi Jets
- Bishōnen

== Narrators ==
=== First Period ===
Descriptions of food shown on screen are provided by two voice actors:

Shinsuke Chikaishi (近石真介, Chikaishi Shunsuke)
Michio Hazama (羽佐間道夫, Hazama Michio)
