= Yutaka Ishinabe =

Japanese chef (born 1948)

- Born: February 7, 1948 (age 77); Yokohama, Japan
- Culinary career
- Cooking style: French cuisine
- Television show(s): Iron Chef

Yutaka Ishinabe (石鍋 裕, Ishinabe Yutaka; born February 7, 1948 in Yokohama, Japan) is a Japanese - French chef notable for being the first French chef in the Japanese cooking show Iron Chef. He appeared from the first episode in 1993, sporting a green outfit while holding a bell pepper. Over the years, he has earned the nickname of "The Artist" for being creative with all his approaches to food. He has the highest winning percentage of any of the Iron Chefs due mainly to the fact that he fought only 8 battles: he won 7 and lost 1. He is the only Iron Chef never to tie. Ishinabe's single loss was to Jacques Borie, a French chef who worked in L'Osier in Tokyo. This was also the only of Ishinabe's battles that was shown in America when Food Network aired the original series.

Ishinabe ended his Iron Chef career at the end of 1993 due to the stressful nature of the show, the one-hour time limit, and the judgement of his last battle, which he lost to Jacques Borie. He remained involved with the series, competing in one battle as an Iron Chef during the convalescence of Iron Chef Japanese Rokusaburo Michiba and assisting Iron Chef French Hiroyuki Sakai as part of the French team in the "2000th Dish" Special. He also was a guest commentator and judge on several occasions, most notably when regular commentator Dr. Yukio Hattori competed in a battle.

After appearing on Iron Chef, Ishinabe opened a chain of restaurants called "Queen Alice". He lives in Paris, France.
