= Pierre Gagnaire =

French chef (born 1950)

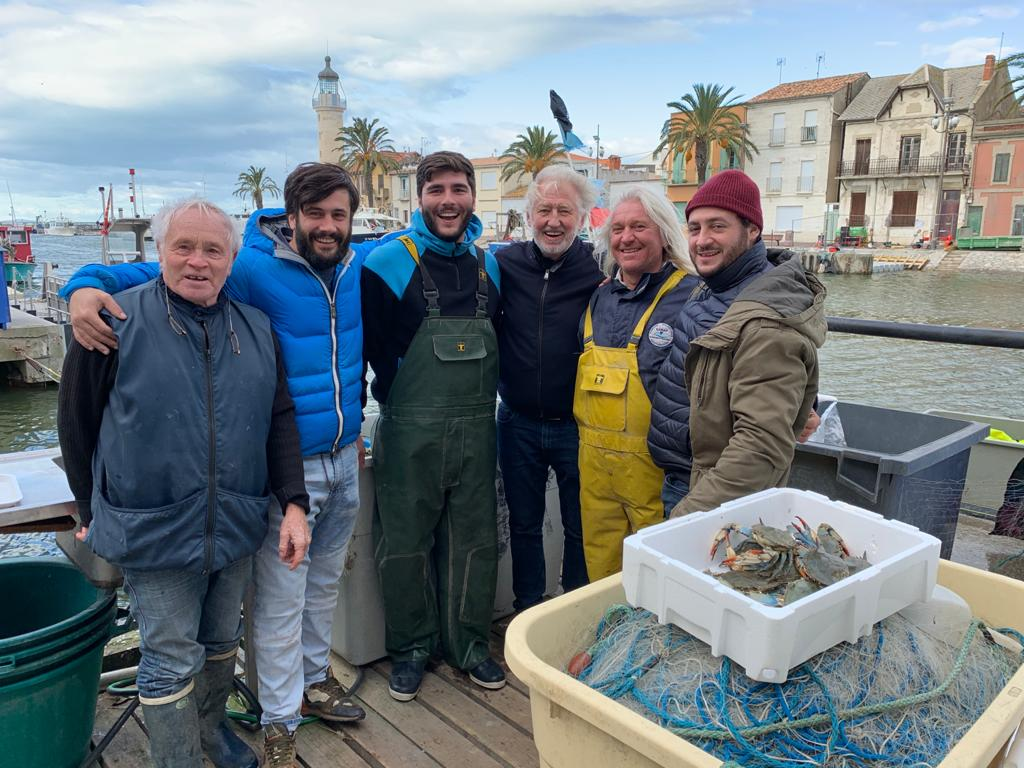
- Gagnaire (third from right)
- Born: Pierre Galmier Gagnaire; 9 April 1950 (age 75); Apinac, Loire, France
- Culinary career
- Cooking style: Haute cuisine; fusion
- Rating: Michelin stars
- Current restaurants: Restaurant Pierre Gagnaire (Paris); Sketch (London)
- Television show: Fuji TV: Iron Chef (1995)
- Website: pierre-gagnaire.com

Pierre Galmier Gagnaire (French pronunciation: [pjɛʁ ɡaɲɛʁ]; born 9 April 1950) is a French chef who is the head chef and owner of the eponymous Pierre Gagnaire restaurant at 6 Rue Balzac in the 8th arrondissement of Paris. Gagnaire is an iconoclastic chef at the forefront of the fusion cuisine movement.

Beginning his career in Saint-Étienne where he won three Michelin stars, Gagnaire tore at the conventions of classic French cooking by introducing juxtapositions of flavours, tastes, textures, and ingredients. On his website, he gives his mission statement as the wish to run a restaurant which is 'facing tomorrow but respectful of yesterday' ("tourné vers demain mais soucieux d'hier").

== In Europe ==
The restaurant, Pierre Gagnaire, specializes in modern French cuisine and has garnered three Michelin stars. Gagnaire is also head chef of Sketch in London. In 2005, both restaurants were ranked in the S.Pellegrino World's 50 Best Restaurants by industry magazine Restaurant, with Pierre Gagnaire ranking third for three consecutive years (2006, 2007, and 2008).

== In the United States ==
In December 2009, Gagnaire made his United States debut with Twist, a new restaurant at the Mandarin Oriental in Las Vegas, which received a Forbes Five-Star Award but has since closed.

== Media appearances ==
Pierre Gagnaire has made appearances on Fuji TV's Iron Chef. He represented France in the 1995 Iron Chef World Cup in Tokyo, with the other chefs chosen being Italy's Gianfranco Vissani and Hong Kong's Xu Cheng as well as Iron Chef Japanese Rokusaburo Michiba representing Japan. In 1996, Chef Gagnaire also appeared in the Japanese Iron Chef "France Battle Special: Battle Lobster" at Château de Brissac, where he competed against and bested Iron Chef French Hiroyuki Sakai. This battle was labeled as “25 Hour Battle” when it aired because both chefs collected ingredients themselves in local markets over a 24-hour period, and then cooked for the show’s usual one hour competition format. Upon the decision, Sakai raised Gagnaire’s hand as the match winner, and Gagnaire promptly adjusted hand positions to raise Sakai’s, in a sign of mutual respect.

== Politics ==
In 2024, he was approached to stand in the 2024 European Parliament election to stand as a candidate for the Rural Alliance, but decided against it.

== Awards ==
In 2015, Gagnaire won a Best Chef in the World award.

== Restaurants ==
- Paris, Pierre Gagnaire, 1996–
- Paris, Gaya rive gauche par Pierre Gagnaire, 2005–
- Berlin, Les Solistes by Pierre Gagnaire, 2013–2016 (closed)
- Bordeaux, La Grande Maison
- Châtelaillon, Gaya Cuisine De Bords de Mer
- Courchevel, Piero TT, 2007–
- Danang, La Maison 1888
- Dubai, Restaurant CHOIX Pâtisserie TT Restaurant par Pierre Gagnaire, 2008–
- Gordes, Peir 2015-
- Hong Kong, Pierre, 2006–2020
- Las Vegas, Twist, 2009–
- London, Sketch, 2002–
- Moscow, Les Menus par Pierre Gagnaire, (closed)
- Riyadh, Acacia by Pierre Gagnaire, (closed)
- Seoul, Pierre Gagnaire à Séoul, 2008–
- Saint-Tropez, Colette, (closed)
- Shanghai, Le Comptoir de Pierre Gagnaire, 2017–
- Tokyo, http://www.pierre-gagnaire.com/ Pierre Gagnaire - Tokyo], 2005–
- Barrière Hotels group (Paris, Enghien les Bains, Courchevel, Toulouse, Cannes, La Baule) Fouquet's
