= La Tour d'Argent =

Parisian restaurant

Coordinates: 48°50′59.58″N 2°21′17.60″E

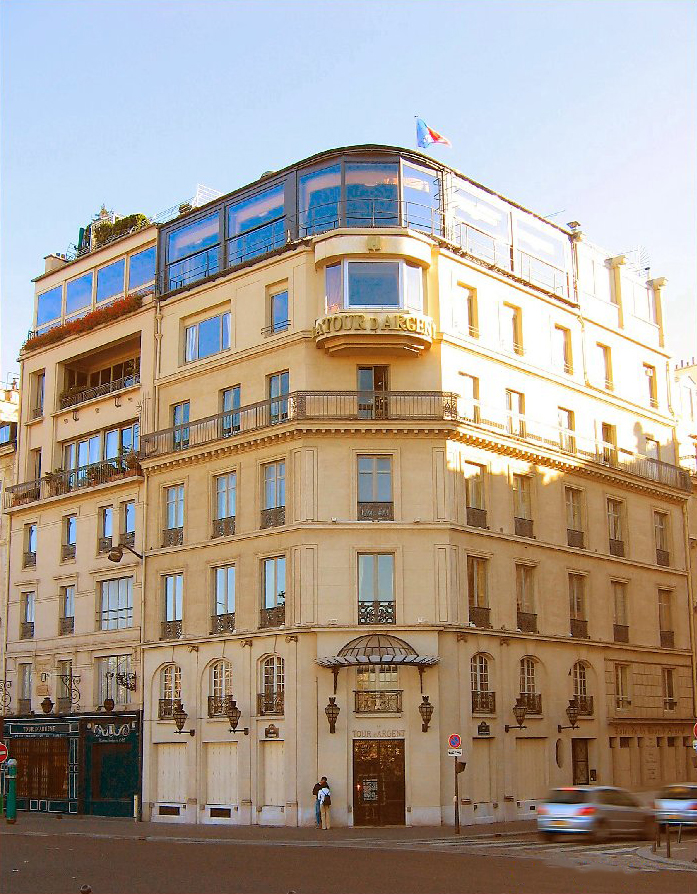
- Interactive map of La Tour d'Argent

Restaurant information
- Established: 1582
- Owner: André Terrail
- Head chef: Yannick Franques
- Rating: Michelin Guide
- Location: 15 Quai de la Tournelle, Paris, 75005
- Website: tourdargent.com

La Tour d'Argent (French pronunciation: [la tuʁ daʁʒɑ̃], lit. 'The Silver Tower') is a historic restaurant in the 5th arrondissement of Paris, France. Located at 15 Quai de la Tournelle it holds one star from the Michelin Guide.

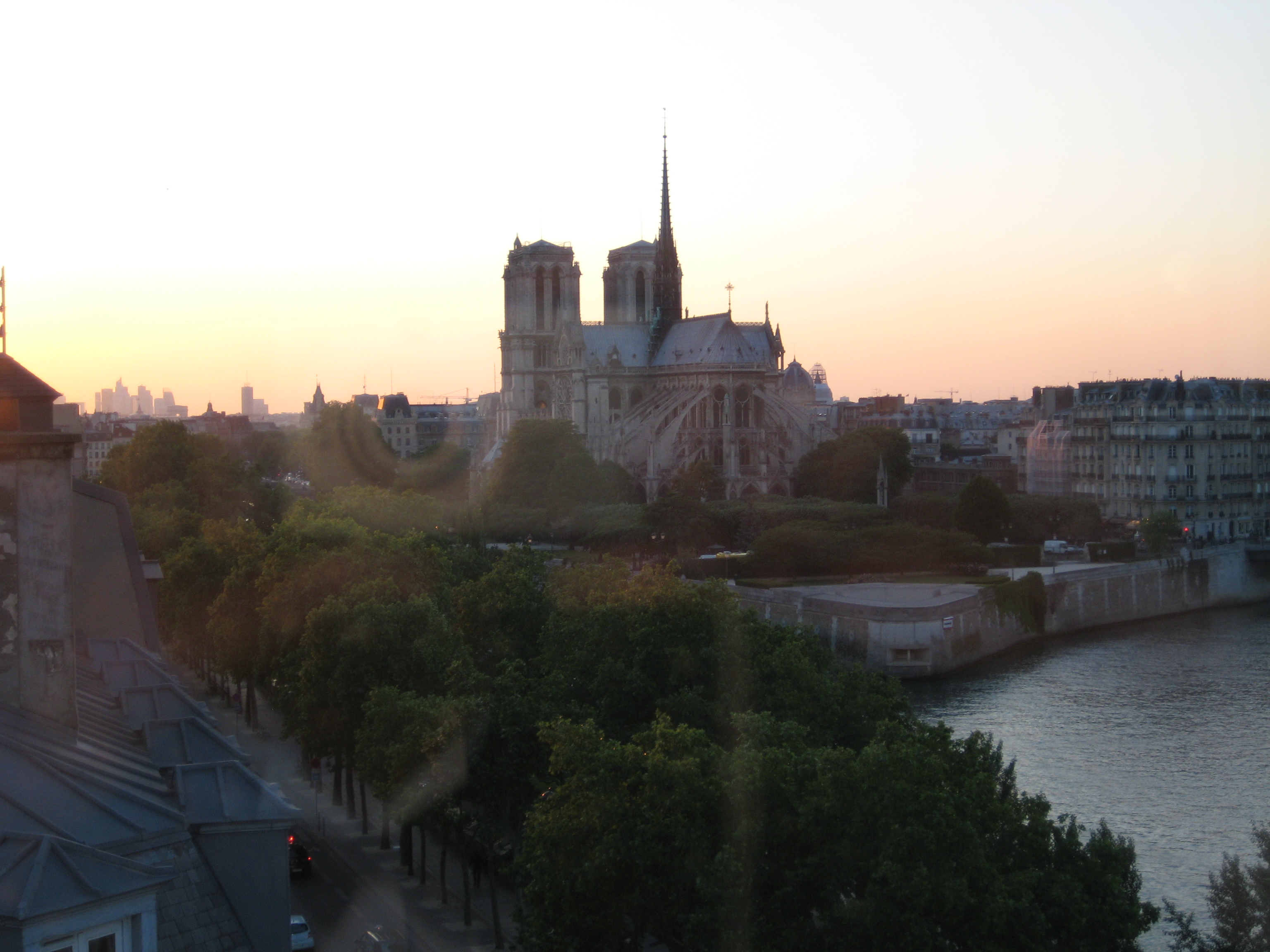
View from the restaurant of Notre Dame and the Seine

== History ==
The restaurant claims that it was founded in 1582, and that it was frequented by Henri IV, but offers no documentation to support these or other claims about its history. The Quai de la Tournelle, where the restaurant stands, was not paved until 1650, before which it was "a slope, often flooded and almost always made inaccessible by mud". The restaurant today is at the corner of the Rue du Cardinal-Lemoine, which did not exist until the end of the eighteenth century.

The restaurant does not appear in an 1824 list of "The principal restaurants, who are distinguished by the elegance of the decoration of their salons and by the number and the care taken with the dishes found there..." In 1852, a metals dealer occupied number 15 Quai de la Tournelle, and a hairdresser and wood dealer number 17.

Baedeker's 1860 guide to Paris describes the establishment's current location as "out of the way", while mentioning a restaurant associated with a low-cost "Hotel of the Tour d'Argent": "Between Notre Dame and the jardin des Plantes, on the Quai de la Tournelle, facing the bridge of this name, there is a little hotel and the restaurant Lecoq; Hôtel de la Tour d'argent, a bit out of the way, it is true, but well kept and cheap (room, 2 francs, beefsteak, 1 franc). Facing a swimming school, which has the advantage of not yet being encumbered and imprisoned by all the filth of Paris."

The restaurant was owned in the 1890s and 1900s by Frédéric Delair, who began the tradition of presenting a numbered certificate to each person who ate the restaurant's signature dish, pressed duck. A dinner was held there for the Wright Brothers in 1906. In 1912, the Terrail family bought the restaurant. It was operated first by André Terrail, then by his son Claude, who died in 2006 at the age of 88, and then by Claude's son André.

In 1984, a branch was opened in Tokyo, in the Hotel New Otani.

Since 1986, La Tour d'Argent has been a recipient of the Wine Spectator Grand Award.

Until 1996, the Guide Michelin awarded the restaurant three stars. The rating was reduced to two stars in 1996, and to one star in 2006.

In 2023, the restaurant completed a renovation of its premises, designed by architect Franklin Azzi.

== Specialities ==
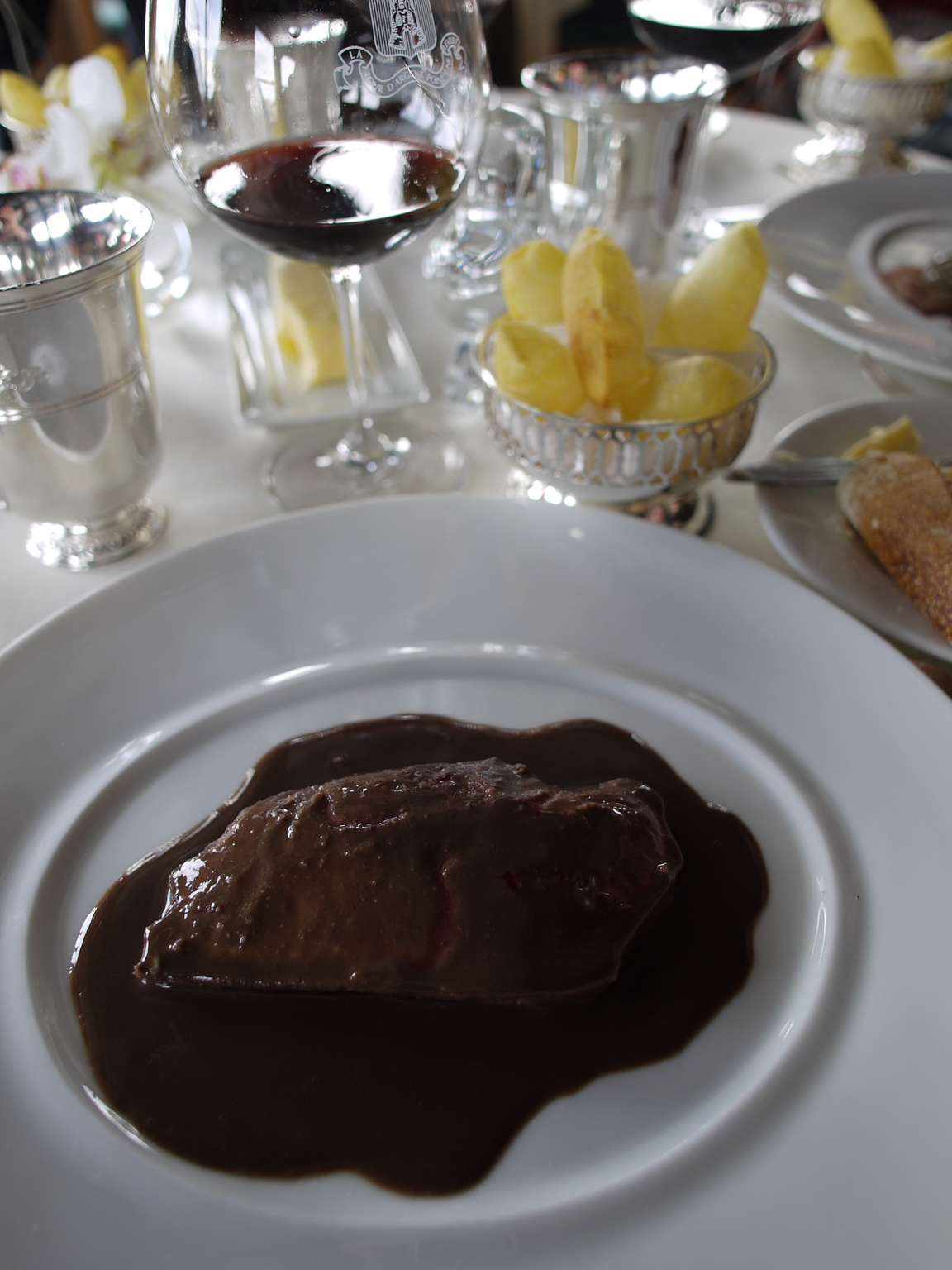
Canard à la presse

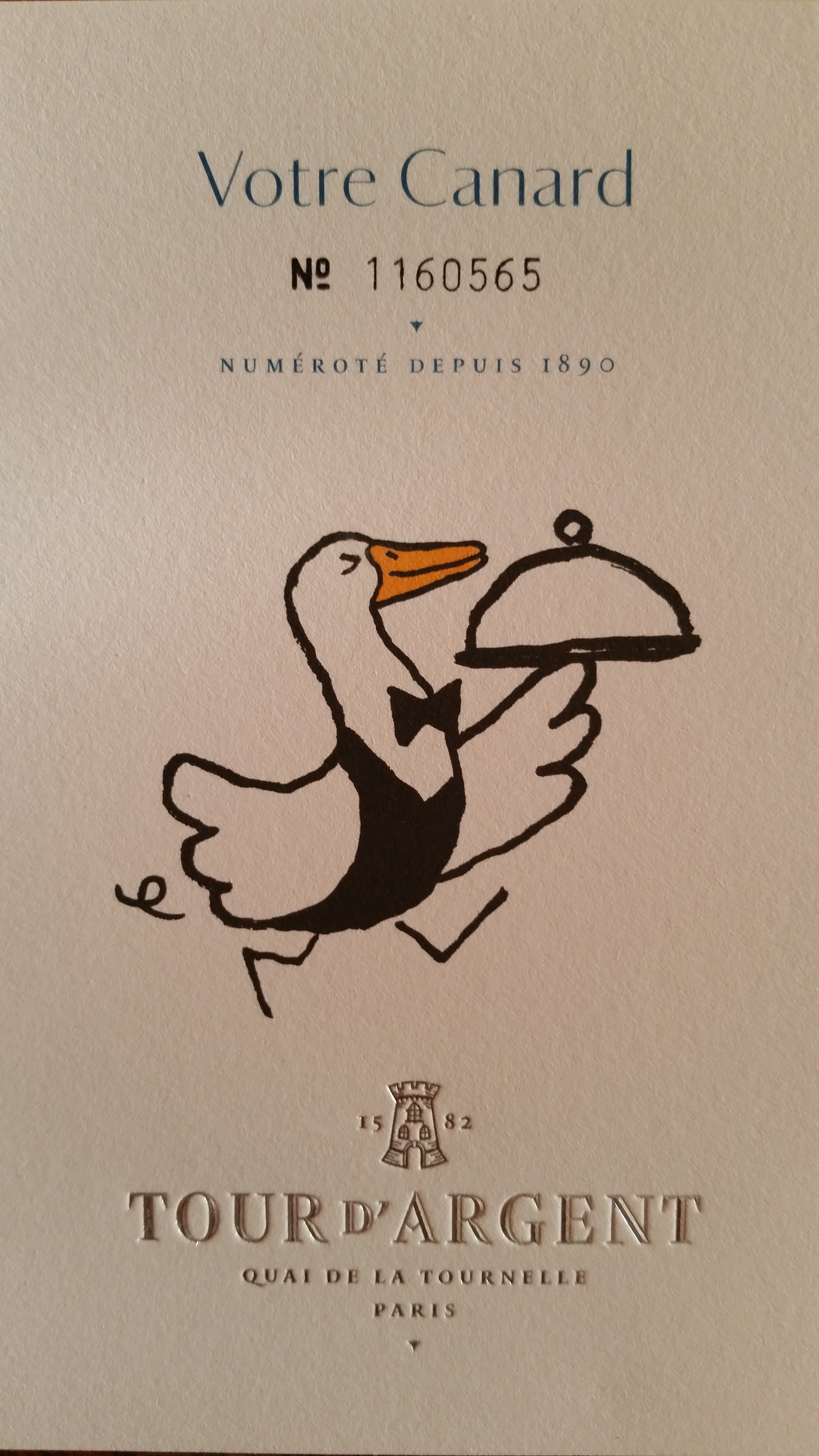
La Tour d'Argent "Your Duck" serial number card issued on 22 December 2017

Duck, especially the pressed duck, is the speciality (Canard à la presse, Caneton à la presse, Caneton Tour d'Argent, and recently renamed “Caneton de Frédéric Delair”). The restaurant raises its ducks on its own farm. Diners who order the duck receive a postcard with the bird's serial number, now well over 1 million. (Serial number #112,151 went to U.S. President Franklin Delano Roosevelt, #203,728 went to Marlene Dietrich, and #253,652 went to Charlie Chaplin).

The restaurant's wine cellar, guarded around the clock, contains more than 450,000 bottles whose value was estimated in 2009 at 25 million euros (£22.5 million). Some 15,000 wines are offered to diners on a 400-page list. During a routine inventory control in 2024, wine worth more than €1.5m was found to be missing from the wine cellar.

The dining room has an excellent view of the river Seine and Notre Dame.

== Cultural references ==
In Accidental Agent, A thrilling account of underground warfare in France, John Goldsmith, agent of the British Special Operations Executive, tells how after escaping his German SS captors at Hotel Continentale in the Rue de Rivoli, he was hidden in an upper-floor flat in the Tour d'Argent building that was occupied by Rumanian actress Madame Tantzy.

In A Moveable Feast, Ernest Hemingway says that the Tour d'Argent rented some rooms and gave its lodgers discounts on the meals; also that a valet there used to sell English books left by the tenants.

Marcel Proust mentions the restaurant three times in his novel À la recherche du temps perdu (In Search of Lost Time). For example, the haughty Mme Verdurin sniffs "The Tour d'Argent is not nearly as good as they make out".

In a scene in the 1960 novel The Centurions where French prisoners of war are discussing the kinds of meals and cars they plan to buy with their backpay, an officer named Captain Verdier mentions that Lapérouse has been surpassed by Tour d'Argent in quality, a fact that he finds "most annoying".

The restaurant inspired scenes in the 2007 Pixar movie Ratatouille, and received an "unexpected boost" from the film.

Four episodes of Fuji TV's Iron Chef had chefs from the Paris and Tokyo branches as challengers. From the Paris branch, Bernard Leprince faced Iron Chef Japanese Komei Nakamura twice, with either chef winning once (Leprince won the initial meeting on the French Special at Chateau de Brissac with salmon as the theme, while Nakamura won the rematch in Tokyo with duck as the theme). Meanwhile, from the Tokyo branch, Tadaaki Shimizu bested Iron Chef French Hiroyuki Sakai with lobster as the theme, while Dominique Corby was the 300th challenger and battled Iron Chef Chinese Chen Kenichi to a draw with foie gras as the regulation theme and asparagus as the overtime theme.

One episode of Root into Europe (British comedy starring George Cole) was filmed in the hotel, and the duck being pressed is shown and served to the actors. Claude Terrail appeared as himself.

The restaurant was visited in the Paris episode of Remarkable Places to Eat (presented by Fred Sirieix, with Michel Roux Jr. as the guide), featuring the duck being pressed at their table, and a visit to the wine cellar.

== See also ==
- List of Michelin-starred restaurants in Paris
- List of oldest companies
- Café Procope
- Le Grand Véfour
- La Pyramide
- Larousse Gastronomique
- Michelin Guide
