= Shinichiro Ohta =

Japanese voice actor and television announcer

- Born: Shinichiro Ohta; March 20, 1971 (age 55); Kanagawa, Japan
- Occupations: Voice actor, narrator
- Years active: 1991-present
- Agent: Aoni Production
- Height: 172 cm (5 ft 8 in)

Shinichiro Ohta (太田 真一郎, Ōta Shin'ichirō; born March 20, 1971) is a Japanese voice actor and television announcer noted primarily in the English-speaking world for his appearance as the kitchen reporter in Iron Chef, where he was known for his rapid-fire announcing style. On the English-language version of Iron Chef, which aired on Food Network, Ohta's dialogue is dubbed by American voice actor Jeff Manning. Ohta's character is perhaps best known for his line, "Fukui-san?" (Mr. Fukui), which he would say several times per episode, when interrupting Kenji Fukui's commentary with a report from the field. His talent agency is Aoni Production.

== Filmography ==
- Getter Robo Go (1991) - Guardman
- Sailor Moon (1992) - Ryo Urawa, Bumboo, Ned, Kamoi
- Shippū! Iron Leaguer (1993) - Gold Mask
- Aoki Densetsu Shoot (1993) - Tsuyoshi Akahori
- Dragon Ball Z: The History of Trunks (1993) - Tenshu
- Orguss 02 (1993) - Lean
- Captain Tsubasa J (1994) - Jun Misugi (adult)
- Marmalade Boy (1994) - Satoshi Miwa
- Romeo's Blue Skies (1995) - Tachioni
- Dragon Ball GT (1996) - Kibito Kaiōshin
- Doctor Slump (1997) - Taro Soramame
- Iron Chef (1998) - Kitchen Reporter
- One Piece (1999) - Shura, Peepley Lulu, Momonga
- Gadget & the Gadgetinis (2002) - General Sir
- Inuyasha (2001) - Satsuki's Brother
- Ultimate Muscle (2002) - Tyrannoclaw
- Bobobo-bo Bo-bobo (2003) - Narrator, Serviceman
- Full Metal Panic? Fumoffu (2003) - Jin High Rugby Team Member B
- Yu-Gi-Oh! Duel Monsters GX (2004) - Mattimatica
- Gunparade Orchestra (2005) - Sora Kojima
- GoGo Sentai Boukenger (2006) - Narrator, equipment (voice)
- Gegege no Kitaro (2007) - chairman, Mamemura
- Kamen Rider Decade (2009) - Reporter
- Dragon Ball Super (2015) - Kibito Kaiōshin, Shin
- Kinnikuman: Perfect Origin Arc (2024) - Announcer
- Dragon Ball Daima (2024) - Shin (adult)
- Food Battle Club - Field Reporter
- KR Double Hyper Battle DVD: Donburi's α/Farewell Recipe of Love - Frog Pod
- Pride Fighting Championships - Ring Announcer
- Sotsugyo M - Ryunosuke Sugita

== Drama CD ==
- Dengeki Bunko Best Game Selection7 Fire Emblem Tabidati no syou - Marth
- GFantasy Comic CD Collection Fire Emblem: Ankoku Ryū to Hikari no Ken - Julian
- Lunar: Eternal Blue Lunar Eternal Blue: Lunatic Parade: Vol. 1 Lunar: Eternal Blue Hope's Second Chance! - Leo/Mystere

== Video games ==
- Lunar: Eternal Blue (1994) - Leo
- BS Shiren the Wanderer: Save Surara (1996) - Shiren
- BS Fire Emblem: Akaneia Senki (1997) - Navarre, Belf, additional voices
- Mystical Ninja Starring Goemon (1998) - Goemon
- Kinnikuman Generations (2004) - Screw Kid

== Japanese dub ==
- Caravan of Courage: An Ewok Adventure - Narrator
- Pinocchio - Foul Fellow
