= Wakiya =

Wakiya (written: 脇谷 or 脇屋) is a Japanese surname. Notable people with the surname include:

- Ryota Wakiya (脇谷 亮太, born 1981), Japanese baseball player
- Yūji Wakiya (脇屋 友詞, born 1958), Japanese chef

== See also ==
- 5847 Wakiya, main-belt asteroid
