= Yūji Wakiya =

Japanese chef

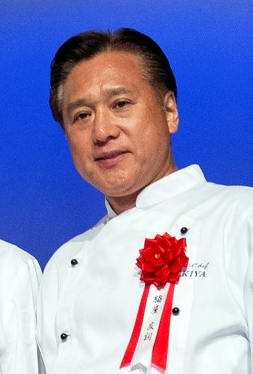
Yūji Wakiya (in Shinjuku Ward, Tōkyō Metropolis, Japan on August 10, 2018)

Yūji Wakiya (脇屋 友詞, Wakiya Yūji; born 20 March 1958) is a Japanese - Cantonese chef famous for cooking Chinese cuisine.

== Biography ==
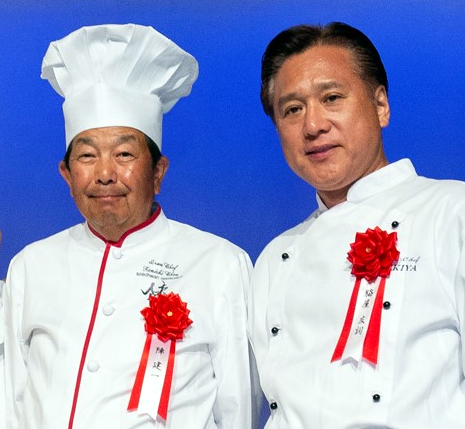
with Chen Kenichi (August 10, 2018)

Wakiya was born in Sapporo, Hokkaidō. He began his career as a chef in 1973, at the age of 15, when he got a job in a Chinese restaurant in Ōsaka; he opened his own restaurant, Turandot, in the Yokohama branch of the Pan Pacific Hotel in 1995. He appeared on Fuji Television's Iron Chef two times during its original broadcast run, losing to Iron Chef French Hiroyuki Sakai in the Sea Urchin battle in 1994, before winning in 1997 against Iron Chef Chinese Chen Kenichi with Papaya as the theme. and was named Iron Chef Chinese for the 2012 revival of the series. He opened a restaurant in New York City's Gramercy Park Hotel in July 2007, garnering a mixed review from the New York Times. Now Chef at KOA Restaurant, 12 West Twenty First Street, New York.

== Publications ==
- Wakiya, Yūji (November 1996), 脇屋友詞の上海料理―家庭でできる達人秘伝の味 [Yūji Wakiya's Shanghai Cuisine - Secrets Flavours of the Master You Can Make at Home], Jitsugyō No Nihonsha, ISBN 4-408-62447-0
- Wakiya, Yūji (August 1997), 新しい中華のおかず [New Chinese Side-Dishes], Shufu-to-seikatsusha, ISBN 4-391-12058-5
- Wakiya, Yūji (December 1997), 香港のデザート [Hong Kong Desserts], Bunka Shuppankyoku, ISBN 4-579-20606-1
- Wakiya, Yūji (May 1999), 上海のヌードル [Shanghai Noodles], Bunka Shuppankyoku, ISBN 4-579-20667-3
- Wakiya, Yūji (October 1999), 脇屋友詞のどこにもない、すっきり味おいしい香り [Yūji Wakiya's Refreshing, Delicious Flavours You Can't Find Anywhere Else], Kōdansha, ISBN 4-06-209926-8
- Wakiya, Yūji (January 2001), 中国茶の愉しみ [Enjoying Chinese Tea], NHK Publishing, ISBN 4-14-188311-5
- Wakiya, Yūji (April 2002), 脇屋友詞のおもてなし家郷菜 [Yūji Wakiya's Home-style Cooking for Entertainment], NHK Publishing, ISBN 4-14-187537-6
- Wakiya, Yūji (February 2003), 「プロが教える」きほんの中国料理 [Basic Chinese Cuisine Taught by a Professional], ASCII Communications, ISBN 4-7762-0039-2
- Wakiya, Yūji (October 2003), フライパンでつくる脇屋流基本のチャイニーズ [Basic Wakiya-style Chinese You Can Make in a Frying Pan], Kōdansha, ISBN 4-06-271567-8
- Wakiya, Yūji (November 2008), Haute Chinese Cuisine from the Kitchen of Wakiya, Kodansha International, ISBN 978-4-7700-3072-6
