= Yukio Hattori =

Japanese television personality (1945–2024)

- 服部 幸應
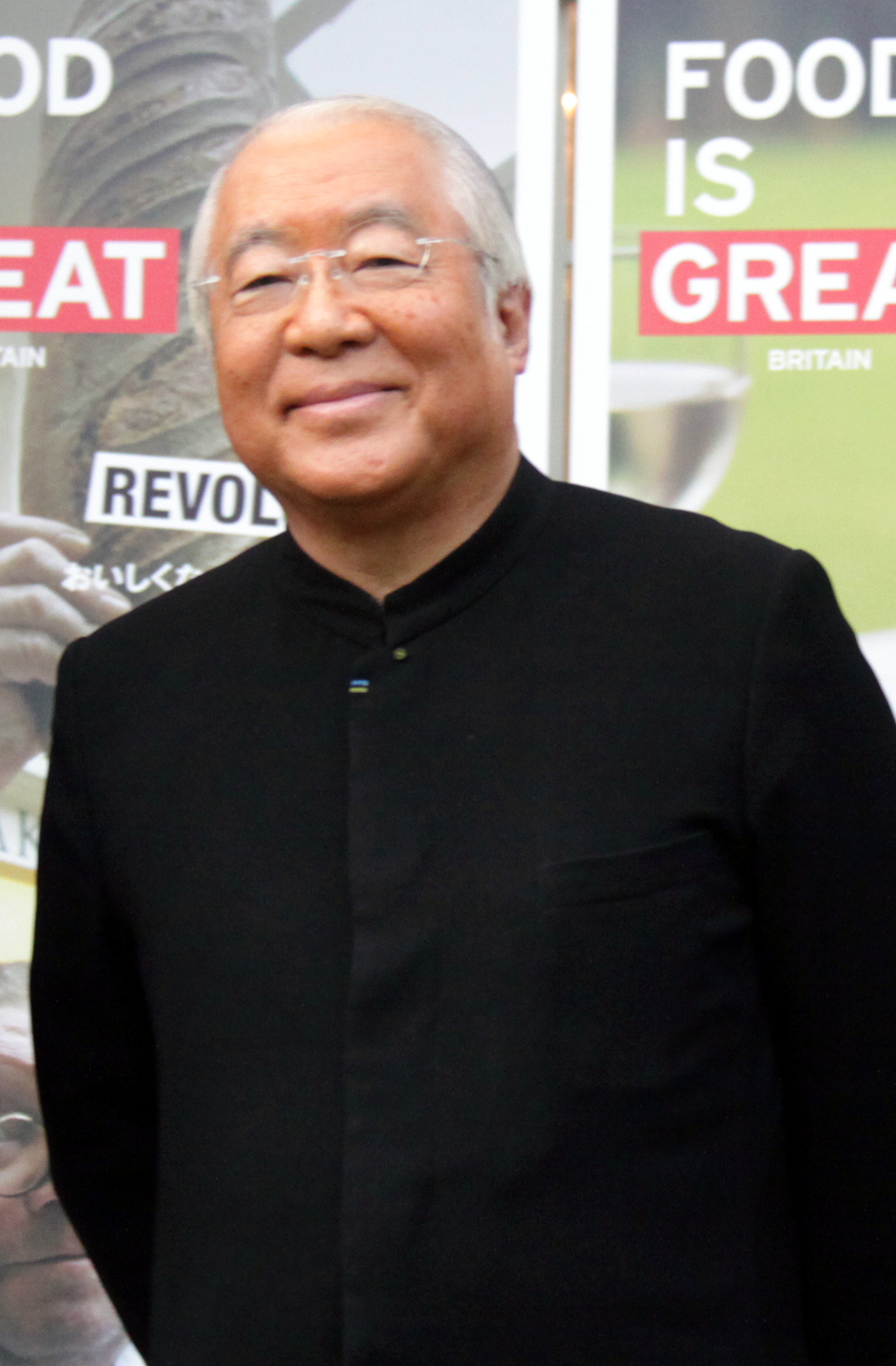
- Hattori in 2013
- Born: 16 December 1945; Tokyo, Japan
- Died: 4 October 2024 (aged 78); Tokyo, Japan
- Education: Showa University; Rikkyo University
- Occupation: President of the Hattori Nutrition College
- Known for: Appearances on the Japanese television show Iron Chef

Yukio Hattori (服部 幸應, Hattori Yukio; 16 December 1945 – 4 October 2024) was a Japanese television personality who was best known as an expert commentator on the television show Iron Chef. Hattori was also the fifth president of the Hattori Nutrition College; the Iron Chef end credits mention that the program is "produced in cooperation with" the College. Hattori received a PhD from Showa University.

== Life and career ==
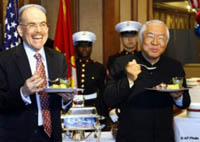
Hattori and James Zumwalt (left), Chargé d'affaires, tasted a special menu at the U.S. Embassy's Independence Day Celebration in Tokyo. (2 July 2009)

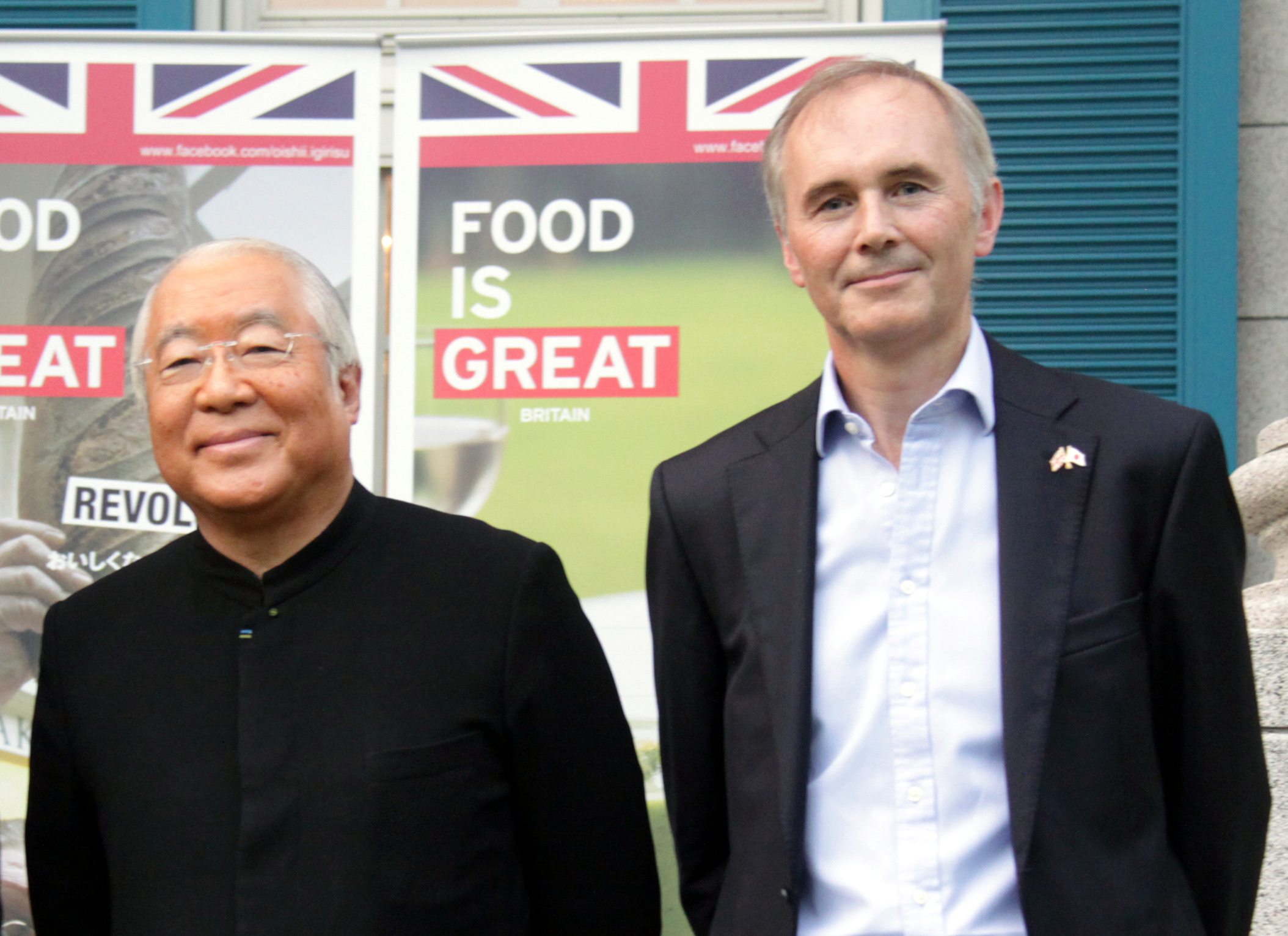
Hattori met Tim Hitchens (right), Ambassador, at the British Embassy in Tokyo. (28 August 2013)

In the English-dubbed version of Iron Chef, shown on the U.S. Food Network and Australia's SBS network, Hattori was often referred to as "Doc" by the show's announcer, Kenji Fukui. After being introduced, Hattori typically responded, "Always a pleasure." While his main role on the show was as a commentator, Hattori took the place of Chairman Takeshi Kaga at least once when the chairman "boycotted" Kitchen Stadium to protest the poor performance of his Iron Chefs. (The boycott was scripted in the show, as Kaga had another taping schedule that night.) Hattori also challenged the Iron Chefs at least twice. His first battle, in 1994, was against Iron Chef Japanese Rokusaburo Michiba; truffles were the theme ingredient. In his second battle, in 1998, he faced off against Iron Chef Japanese Koumei Nakamura over tuna. Hattori lost both battles.

His voice in the English-dubbed version of Iron Chef is supplied by Canadian-born voice actor Scott Morris. Hattori taped an appearance in season 2 of The Next Iron Chef.

He also served as an expert commentator on the TV series Ai no epuron (愛のエプロン; 'Apron of Love'), a show where celebrities would attempt to make dishes, do so either successfully or horribly, and be judged on their food.

Hattori appeared as a special guest of one of the judges in the baking contest in Yakitate!! Japan (episode 7).

Hattori died on 4 October 2024, at the age of 78.
