= Gurinderjit Singh =

- Born: Siliguri, West Bengal, India
- Occupation: Chef

Gurinderjit Singh is an Indian-born chef based in Brisbane, Australia. He is currently the owner/chef of an eatery that offers an amalgamation of Indian/Mexican cuisines, IndiMex Café Bar Restaurant at Stones Corner, Greenslopes.

== History ==
Born in Siliguri, India, he has lived in various countries including Japan, the United States, and now Australia and goes by the more familiar name of GJ Singh. GJ was born in a traditional Sikh family to a father who was an engineer with the Indian Railways. GJ's father hoped for similar from his son but the chef always had a passion for cooking, even as a child. Chef GJ earned his chef license at Hattori Nutrition College under Chef Yukio Hattori of Iron Chef fame. He worked with many notable restaurants in Japan as part of his college training then started off with his chef career a few years down the line, as the Executive Chef in Tokyo, Japan at La Mex, a Mexican restaurant. During his time in Japan, apart from working as a chef, he occasionally taught Mexican cuisine in Tsuji Cooking Academy and other notable schools. Prior to serving at the Mexican restaurant, he was also behind the idea of opening an Indian restaurant in Japan known as Ganges.

Between 1986 and 2001, he owned La Mex, that serves food that are a blend of flavours from California and Mexico, at Marina Mirage and La Bamba restaurant at Southport, both on Queensland's Gold Coast. He came to Perth, Australia, in 1990 and that is when he decided to settle and open up a restaurant in Australia that would serve Mexican cuisine.

With his culinary expertise in Mexican cuisine, he also flew home to India to inaugurate a Mexican restaurant in 1995 and take part in a fortnight long food festival, where he took along with him 182 Mexican spices to cater to the event.

In 2001, GJ went back home to India and worked as Vice President, Operations for INOX Leisure Limited, venturing into a chain of multiplexes quoting "I loved the movies and I always wanted to be connected to them!". Later on, he headed the Mall Management as Director, Facilities for Future Group, the largest retail organisation in India, opening many malls and also food and beverage businesses.

Upon moving back to Australia in 2011, GJ established his first Indian restaurant by the name of IndiYum Fair Dinkum Indian, that was inaugurated in July, 2011. It was there that he experimented with the concept of “funky Indian with a Mexican twist”. On 8 May 2014, Chef GJ opened IndiMex Café Bar Restaurant, by trusting his instinct and market research that the blend of Indian and Mexican culture in food would be appreciated by Brisbane restaurant-goers.

The idea of opening his latest venture, IndiMex, came to Chef GJ when he recognised the many similarities between the way Indians and Mexicans approach food and meal times. At IndiMex, the decor shows a culture of world peace while the food plays with the synergies of spices from both cultures, as suggested by the name of the restaurant. The synergies between Indian and Mexican ingredients and recipes, as presented in the IndiMex manner have received a positive response from the clientele and critics.
