= Bill Bickard =

American actor

Bill Bickard is an American voice-over actor most famous for his work on Iron Chef as the dub voice for the announcer, Kenji Fukui. He was also a PA announcer for Japan Professional Baseball's 2002 All Star Game vs. Major League Baseball players.
