= Froidevaux (surname) =

The surname Froidevaux may refer to:

- Camille Froidevaux-Metterie (born 1968), French philosopher, researcher and professor
- Etienne Froidevaux (born 1989), Swiss professional ice hockey player
- Francis Froidevaux (born 1971), retired Swiss football defender
- Robin Froidevaux (born 1998), Swiss road and track cyclist
- Stéphane Froidevaux, French chef
