= Chili shrimp =

Stir-fried shrimp in chili sauce

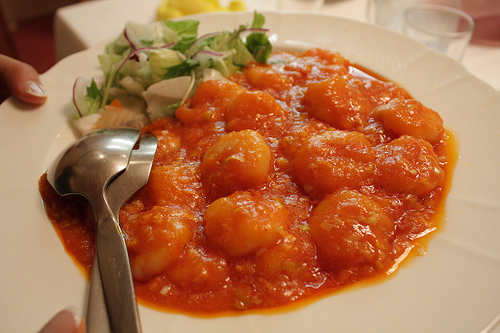
- Place of origin: China
- Region or state: Sichuan, Shanghai
- Main ingredients: stir-fried shrimp in chili sauce

Chili shrimp (simplified Chinese: 干烧明虾; traditional Chinese: 乾燒明蝦; pinyin: gān shāo míngxiā or simplified Chinese: 明虾; traditional Chinese: 明蝦; pinyin: míngxiā) is a dish of stir-fried shrimp in chili sauce (which may use doubanjiang) in Chinese cuisine. It is a part of both Sichuan and Shanghai cuisines.

The Sichuan version has a crisp texture and uses dried chillis, onions, and tomatoes.

In Japanese Chinese cuisine, ebi-chiri (Japanese: エビチリ) is derived from Shanghai-style Sichuan cuisine. It consists of stir-fried shrimp in chilli sauce. It has a history in Japan. According to Iron Chef, ebi-chiri was introduced to and popularized in Japan by Chen Kenmin, father of Iron Chef Chinese Chen Kenichi.

In Korean Chinese cuisine, chili shrimp is called kkansyo-saeu (Korean: 깐쇼새우), a named consisting of the word kkansyo derived from Chinese gān shāo (乾燒, "dry braising") and saeu meaning "shrimp" in Korean, or chilli-saeu (Korean: 칠리새우) with the English-derived word chilli.

There is a Singaporean version of chili shrimp derived from the Sichuan version, but it has a moist texture and uses fresh chili peppers. The New York Times stated that the Singapore version "resembles only slightly the Chinese version."

== See also ==
- Chili chicken
- List of seafood dishes
