= Chen Kenmin =

Chinese-born Japanese chef

陳 健民 Chen Kenmin
- Born: 陳健民 Chén Jiànmín; June 27, 1912; Yibin, Sichuan Province, Republic of China
- Died: May 12, 1990 (aged 77); Japan
- Children: 陳 建一 Chen Ken'ichi (son)
- Relatives: 陳 建太郎 Chen Kentarō (grandson)
- Culinary career
- Cooking style: Chinese Imperial cuisine, Sichuan
- Current restaurants
- Shisen Hanten group of restaurants found in Akasaka, Ikebukuro, Roppongi, Tokushima, Kure (Hiroshima Prefecture), Matsuyama and Hakata

Chinese name
- Traditional Chinese: 陳建民
- Simplified Chinese: 陈建民
Transcriptions
Standard Mandarin
- Hanyu Pinyin: Chén Jiànmín

Japanese name
- Kanji: 陳 建民
Transcriptions
- Romanization: Chin Kenmin

Japanese name
- Kanji: 東 建民
- Kana: あずま けんみん
Transcriptions
- Romanization: Azuma Kenmin

Chen Kenmin (Note: Simplified Chinese: 陈建民; Hiragana: ちん けんみん; Katakana: チン ケンミン; Pinyin: Chén Jiànmín) (June 27, 1912 – May 12, 1990), also known as Azuma Kenmin (Japanese: 東 建民) after naturalization, was a Chinese-Japanese chef. He is often credited with introducing Sichuan cuisine to Japan. His son, Chen Kenichi, was also a prominent chef of Chinese cuisine and the Iron Chef Chinese on the television show Iron Chef.

== Early life ==
Chen was born in Yibin, Sichuan Province in 1912. He learned cooking from his mother, and worked in various restaurants in Wuhan, Nanjing and Shanghai. He emigrated to Taiwan in 1947 after the Chinese Civil War, and to Hong Kong in 1948, where he opened a Sichuanese restaurant.

== In Japan ==
Chen emigrated to Japan in 1952 and became a Japanese citizen in 1954. Chen had originally specialized in Chinese imperial cuisine. However, in 1957, upon opening the Shisen Hanten (四川飯店; literally 'Sichuan Inn') restaurant in Japan, Chen arranged his dishes to cater to the tastes of his Japanese clients. Chen introduced Shanghai-style Sichuan cuisine to Japan through the Shisen Hanten Restaurant as well as through nationwide TV shows, particularly NHK's TV show, Kyō no ryōri ("Today's Cuisine" in English). Chen came to be known as the "father of Chinese Sichuan cooking" in Japan.

In 1998, Masuyoshi Kimura, a chef who had been personally trained by Chen Kenmin, appeared as a challenger on Iron Chef, but rather than competing against Chen Kenmin's son, Iron Chef Chen Kenichi, Masuyoshi chose Masaharu Morimoto to be his opponent. Chen Kenichi was present for and watched the battle.

== Chen Kenmin's popular dishes ==
Among the many Shanghai-style and Sichuan-style Japanese Chinese dishes Chen popularized in Japan are:

- "Prawns in Chili Sauce" (simplified Chinese: 干烧虾仁; traditional Chinese: 乾燒蝦仁; pinyin: gān shāo xiā rén), which Chen renamed to Ebi Chili Sauce (エビチリソース, ebi chiri sōsu) for the Japanese.
- Mapo doufu (Chinese: 麻婆豆腐; pinyin: má pó dòu fu).
- Mābō-nasu (麻婆茄子): a stir-fried dish of ground pork with eggplant (mābō-chezu) in a slightly spicy sauce.

== Personal life ==
Chen married a Japanese woman, Yoko Sekiguchi, in 1953. Their son, Kenichi, was born in 1956.

After his naturalization as a Japanese citizen, Chen's name was legally changed to Azuma Kenmin (東 建民), though he continued to use his original surname in his professional life.

=== Death ===
Chen died on 12 May 1990, aged 77.
