= Koumei Nakamura =

Japanese chef

- Born: November 24, 1947 (age 78); Shimabara, Nagasaki, Japan
- Died: 25 January 2026 (aged 78)
- Culinary career
- Cooking style: Japanese
- Current restaurants
- Ariake, Little Koumei, Yokohama, Takamatsu, Nagoya
- Television show
- Iron Chef

Koumei Nakamura (中村 孝明, Nakamura Kōmei; 1947 November 24–2026 January 25 in Shimabara, Nagasaki, Japan), was a Japanese celebrity chef. Most famous for being the second Japanese Iron Chef on the show Iron Chef, he has worked at numerous restaurants such as the Oriental Hotel in Osaka, Nadaman in the Hotel New Otani, and the Nadaman Singapore in the Shangri La Hotel. He later became the manager of Nadaman in the Hotel New Otani. He now has his own restaurant in Ariake, Tokyo. On Iron Chef he wore a purple outfit trimmed with gold in the Japanese style.

== Iron Chef Nakamura ==
In the fall of 1995, Nakamura's predecessor, Rokusaburo Michiba, had fought in the first overtime battle in Kitchen Stadium, a grueling process that led to his retirement at the 1996 Mr. Iron Chef tournament. Michiba's last battle was against fellow Iron Chef Chen Kenichi, and for two months, Kitchen Stadium had only two Iron Chefs while Michiba was tasked to find a successor. During this time, Michiba had repeatedly requested Nakamura to be his successor, but Nakamura repeatedly declined due to two main factors: the first was that, at that time, Michiba's fusion-style Japanese dishes had promoted the stigma among the traditionalist chefs' circle that Iron Chef was to be avoided; the second was that, in contrast to Chen or Hiroyuki Sakai, who owned their own restaurants, Nakamura was a hired chef, and thus had more riding on the line with each battle. Nakamura was ultimately convinced by an old high-school friend who he refers to as his older brother to become an Iron Chef after taking note of the fact that the Iron Chef Japanese was a one-of-a-kind position.

Nakamura is, in stark contrast to Michiba before him and Masaharu Morimoto after, considered to be more of a traditional Japanese chef that was forced to improvise due to unusual-for-traditional-Japanese-cuisine secret ingredients that tended to favor the challenger. He also appeared to be the most concerned about winning and losing - a fact that may have led him to his 24–11–1 record with one no-contest. Not surprisingly, his decisions on the dishes he made were often influenced by his bosses at Nadaman, perhaps to maintain a good corporate image although the restaurant itself ceased to care about Nakamura's performance as an Iron Chef after a year.

During his tenure as an Iron Chef, Nakamura was always compared to Michiba, who was regarded as the top Iron Chef during his tenure. It was said that Nakamura was even ostracised by his family whenever he lost, which was why Nakamura had acquired a pet Shiba dog named "Chef" one year into his tenure. Curiously, despite a sub-par overall performance as an Iron Chef, Nakamura has won the majority of battles against returning challengers going 3–1–1 and other Iron Chefs going 2–1. After a grueling battle with Toshiro Kandagawa (that Nakamura lost), Nakamura retired from Kitchen Stadium in 1998 at the age of 50. His final battle was against Yukio Hattori in Tuna Battle on February 20, 1998, a battle that he won. He did return for Iron Chef Morimoto's one year anniversary, which was Battle Egg on March 12, 1999, a battle that he won.

Nakamura died on 2026 January 25. His funeral was held with only close relatives in attendance. His death was announced on his website two months later.
