= Iron Chef =

Japanese television cooking show

- The seven Iron Chefs and Chairman Kaga in Kitchen Stadium. Left to right: Sakai, Ishinabe, Morimoto, Michiba, Chen, Nakamura, Kobe
- Japanese: 料理の鉄人
- Genre: Cooking show
- Created by: Fuji Creative Corporation
- Directed by: Keiichi Tanaka
- Presented by: Takeshi Kaga; Kenji Fukui; Yukio Hattori; Shinichirō Ōta
- Narrated by: Toshiyuki Makihara
- Theme music composer: Hans Zimmer
- Opening theme: "Show Me Your Firetruck" (score from Backdraft)
- Composers: David Arnold; Bruce Broughton; Aaron Copland; Randy Edelman; Cliff Eidelman; Jerry Goldsmith; James Horner; Yoko Kanno; Dennis McCarthy; Joel McNeely; Michael Nyman; Graeme Revell; Toshihiko Sahashi; Andrew Lloyd Webber; Shōji Yamashiro; Hans Zimmer
- Country of origin: Japan
- Original language: Japanese
- No. of seasons: 7
- No. of episodes: 298 + 4 post-series specials (list of episodes)

Production
- Producers: Kenichi Koga; Toshihiko Matsuo
- Editor: Masaaki Yamamoto
- Running time: 30 minutes with commercials (October 1993-March 1994); 45 minutes with commercials (April 1994-September 1999)
- Production company: Fuji Television

Original release
- Network: FNS (Fuji TV)
- Release: October 10, 1993 – September 24, 1999

Iron Chef (料理の鉄人, Ryōri no Tetsujin; literally "Iron People of Cooking") is a Japanese television cooking show produced by Fuji Television. The series, which premiered on October 10, 1993, is a stylized cook-off featuring guest chefs challenging one of the show's resident "Iron Chefs" in a timed cooking battle built around a specific theme ingredient. The series ended on September 24, 1999, although four occasional specials were produced from January 5, 2000, to January 2, 2002. The series aired 309 episodes. Repeats are regularly aired on the Food Network in Canada, the Cooking Channel in the United States until Asian-American specialty television channel ChimeTV took over reruns in 2022, and on Special Broadcasting Service in Australia; in the United States, it is streamed by Peacock TV and Pluto TV. There are 5 spinoffs, with the latest being Iron Chef: Quest for an Iron Legend.

Fuji TV aired a new version of the show, titled Iron Chef (アイアンシェフ, Aian Shefu), premiering on October 26, 2012.

== Features and story ==
The host of the show is the flamboyant Takeshi Kaga, known on the show as the aristocrat Chairman Kaga (鹿賀主宰, Kaga Shusai). He begins most episodes with his signature words, taken from Arthur Rimbaud, "If memory serves me right...「私の記憶が確かならば…」"(Jadis) si je me souviens bien..." and starts the cooking time with the phrase "Allez Cuisine!". The show has two regular commentators, Kenji Fukui, who narrated the action on the floor, and Yukio Hattori, a food scholar and founder of the Hattori Nutrition College. A floor reporter, Shinichiro Ohta (Yusuke Numata and Takahiro Yoshimizu in the October 17, 1993 and May 20, 1994 episodes respectively), reports to Fukui on what the challengers and Iron Chefs are preparing, their strategy, and their comments, breaking Fukui's train of commentary with a polite "Fukui-san?". One or two guest commentators (who also serve as judges) also made frequent appearances. The commentary covers ingredients, history of contenders, and other background information to give viewers context for what was happening in the kitchen.

The kayfabe "story" behind Iron Chef is recounted at the beginning of every episode of the English dub. A title card, with a quote from famed French food author Jean Anthelme Brillat-Savarin first appeared: "Tell me what you eat, and I'll tell you what you are." Then, it was said that Kaga "realized his dream in a form never seen before" and specially constructed a cooking arena called "Kitchen Stadium". There, visiting chefs from "around the world" would compete against his Gourmet Academy, led by his three (later four) Iron Chefs. Chairman Kaga himself was a showpiece, dressed in outlandish examples of men's formal attire. The English name Iron Chef comes from the show itself: Kaga would use this translation of the Japanese title when summoning his chefs at the beginning of the "battle".

=== Iron Chefs and statistics ===
From the beginning of the show in 1993, the three Iron Chefs were: Iron Chef Japanese Rokusaburo Michiba, Iron Chef Chinese Chen Kenichi, and Iron Chef French Yutaka Ishinabe. After the first season, Ishinabe decided to step down and become an 'honorary Iron Chef', thus passing the mantle of Iron Chef French to Hiroyuki Sakai in 1994. Ishinabe returned for two more battles during season three. At the beginning of season four in 1996, Michiba announced his retirement and debuted Koumei Nakamura as the new Iron Chef Japanese. Michiba returned on rare occasions for special Kitchen Stadium battles. In 1997, Chairman Kaga announced a new, additional Iron Chef to the group: Iron Chef Italian Masahiko Kobe. He was the youngest of the Iron Chefs and battled sparingly throughout the rest of the show, ascending to the stage separately from the three main Iron Chefs, and surrounded by a chamber string ensemble. In 1998, Nakamura also decided to retire and passed the title of Iron Chef Japanese to Masaharu Morimoto.

Iron Chef	Title	Wins	Losses	Draws	No Contests	Total	Win %
Chen Kenichi (陳 建一, Chin Ken'ichi)	Iron Chef Chinese	66	24	3	0	93	72.6%
Yutaka Ishinabe (石鍋 裕, Ishinabe Yutaka)	Iron Chef French (I)	7	1	0	0	8	87.5%
Hiroyuki Sakai (坂井 宏行, Sakai Hiroyuki)	Iron Chef French (II)	70	15	1	0	86	82.4%
Rokusaburo Michiba (道場 六三郎, Michiba Rokusaburō)	Iron Chef Japanese (I)	33	5	1	0	39	85.9%
Koumei Nakamura (中村 孝明, Nakamura Kōmei)	Iron Chef Japanese (II)	22	11	1	1	35	66.2%
Masaharu Morimoto (森本 正治, Morimoto Masaharu)	Iron Chef Japanese (III)	17	8	1	0	26	67.3%
Masahiko Kobe (神戸 勝彦, Kobe Masahiko)	Iron Chef Italian	16	7	1	0	24	68.8%

=== On-screen talent and show staff ===
The show staff was gleaned from many of the original Japanese episodes.

- Kenji Fukui, Announcer/commentator (English-language voice: Bill Bickard)
- Yukio Hattori, Commentator (English-language voice: Scott Morris)
- Takeshi Kaga (as Chairman Kaga), Host (English-language voices: Duncan Hamilton, Kent Frick)
- Shinichiro Ohta, Kitchen reporter (English-language voice: Jeff Manning)
- Planning: Osamu Kanemitsu & Takashi Ishihara
- Composition: Masahiro Ito & Kundō Koyama
- Narrator: Toshiyuki Makihara (First two episodes and Japan Cup 2002 only)
- Technology: HAPPO TELEVISION Inc.
- Technical Director: Kiyoyuki Nakagawa
- Camera: Toshihiro Kase
- Audio: Yoshio Ishizuka
- Video Engineer: Hideho Tanaka
- Videotape Recording: Takanozawa Shinichi
- Lighting: Toshihiko Imado (Fuji Lighting and Technology Inc.)
- Crane: Meiko Select Co., Ltd.
- Location Techniques: Masayuki Nonomura
- Editor: Hironobu Inoue, Masaaki Yamamoto (Replaced Inoue after five episodes)
- Visual Creator: Ken Sonobe (TDK Core Corporation)
- Sound Effects: Chiaki Kado (Project 80 Co., Ltd.)
- Sound Adjustment: Kiwamu Watanabe
- Art Producer: Shigeo Yamada
- Art Designer: Shinji Ishimori
- Art Directors: Semba Fumio & Junji Kashino
- Title Logo: Tetsuya Shimomura
- CG Title: Takao Momozono
- Costume Stylists: Momo Ejima & Toshiko Hatano
- Photographer: Kazuma Uogaeshi
- Food Stylist: Mio Meguro
- Food Coordinator: Setsuko Yuki
- Public Relations: Emiko Ogasawara
- Timekeeper: Kumi Mizuno
- Advisors: Bon Kawai & Hiromichi Naga (Home Run Research Institute)
- Location Cooperation: KENSINGTON
- Material Cooperation: Hattori Nutrition College
- Countdown Voice: Yuko Sumitomo
- Assistant Directors: Takashi Umakoshi, Tomomi Nakamura, and Chinatsu Suzuki
- Assistant Producer: Hanako Aso
- Director: Keiichi Tanaka
- Producers: Kenichi Koga & Toshihiko Matsuo
- Production Cooperation: JAPAN TELEVISION WORKSHOP CO.,LTD.
- Production Copyright: FUJI TELEVISION NETWORK, INC.

=== Original format ===
Originally, challengers vied with each other in preliminary "battles" to earn the right to face an Iron Chef in a 90-minute competition, and should a challenger win twice against Iron Chefs, the challenger would be given the title of "Honorary Iron Chef". However, this format proved unpopular, the preliminary round was scrapped and the main contest was reduced to the now familiar 60 minutes. The awarding of honorary Iron Chef titles to challengers was also discontinued (although this was largely a moot point as few challengers ever defeated two Iron Chefs in separate contests), but was given as an emeritus title for a retiring Iron Chef. Once honorary titles were no longer issued, challengers who beat an Iron Chef had to settle for, according to the English version's introduction, "the people's ovation and fame forever".

In each episode, chefs have one hour to cook and improvise a multicourse meal around a theme ingredient that must be present in each dish. Before the actual taping, the chefs are given a short list of possible themes, allowing the producers of the show to get any ingredients that may be needed. Judges' primary goal was said to be determining which chef was able to "best express the unique qualities of the theme ingredient". In rare cases, the format changed—angler fish battles were typically 75 minutes in length, and noodle battles had the Iron Chef stop after 50 minutes of cooking, only to resume after the challenger's dishes were tasted so that the noodles could be served right after cooking.

=== Preliminary round ===
The first five episodes featured a preliminary round between five challengers. The one who made the dish that impressed the judges the most would battle the Iron Chef. Challengers who are bolded were the winners of this round.

October 10, 1993 (Theme dish: Gyoza)

Challenger	Notes
Seiji Yamada (山田誠司) (Japanese)	Head chef at Utsunomiya Grand Hotel.
Masatoshi Konno (今野正敏) (Japanese)	Member of the "Let's Join the Men's Kitchen Association".
Takahiro Yamakura (山蔵隆弘) (Japanese)	Musashino Culinary Institute.
Pilem Lama (Nepali)	Cuisine "Thuprai" Chef.
**Takeshi Maruyama (丸山 剛) (Japanese)**	Zhou Tomitoku's top disciple.

October 17, 1993 (Theme dish: Omelet rice)

Challenger	Notes
Noboru Ishidoya (石戸谷 登) (Japanese)	St. Marianna University School of Medicine Administrative Staff.
Shinya Abe (阿部晋也) (Japanese)	Chef of German restaurant "Keitel".
Masatada Oshima (大島将忠) (Japanese)	Chef of Japanese restaurant "Hanagasumi".
**Yosei Kobayakawa (小早川陽青) (Japanese)**	Lecturer at Kagawa Nutrition College.
Haruhiko Taniguchi (谷口晴彦) (Japanese)	Student at Seitoku Culinary Institute.

October 31, 1993 (Theme dish: Spaghetti)

Challenger	Notes
Takashi Yonezuka (米塚尚史) (Japanese)	Special effects makeup artist, and designer of the Fuji TV campaign character Frog.
Masami Matsui (松井雅美) (Japanese)	Space Producer.
Naoki Narita (成田直己) (Japanese)	Chef of Italian restaurant "Solanark".
Kim Young Bi (金栄必) (Korean)	Chef of Chinese restaurant "Reirin".
**Paolo Indragoli (Italian)**	Chef at "Sabatini" in Shibuya.

November 7, 1993 (Theme dish: Croquettes)

Challenger	Notes
Motoki Hashino (橋野元樹) (Japanese)	3rd year student at Komazawa High School.
Janan Daran (Indian)	Chef of Indian restaurant "Nile Restaurant".
**Toshiyuki Kudo (工藤敏之) (Japanese)**	Chef of French restaurant "La Rochelle", and Hiroyuki Sakai's top disciple.
Hiroyuki Takahashi (高橋裕之) (Japanese)	Fashion Designer.
Koji Adachi (足立浩二) (Japanese)	Chef of "Naimeiken".

November 14, 1993 (Theme dish: Spring rolls)

Challenger	Notes
Tetsushi Karibe (苅部哲史) (Japanese)	General Manager of Development, Nomura Co., Ltd.
Tran Thi Le (Vietnamese)	Chef of the Vietnamese regional cuisine restaurant "Vietnam", and the only woman to participate in this round.
Toru Okuyama (奥山 徹) (Japanese)	Student at Hattori Nutrition College.
**Zhou Tomiteru (周 富輝) (Cantonese)**	Owner of Yokohama Chinatown "Seikoen".
Luo Bowei (羅 拔威) (Taiwanese)	Chef at "Tainan" in Shinjuku.

=== Theme ingredients ===
Featured ingredients tend toward the exotic and expensive. Many theme ingredients reflect the Japanese origin of the show—river eel, tofu, udon—though ingredients more familiar in the West, such as bell peppers, summer corn, and peaches, are spotlighted, as well. In one episode devoted to asparagus, the challenger boasted that he used over $1,000 worth of lobster (which he then discarded) simply to flavor his asparagus in this battle against Iron Chef Morimoto. Some theme ingredients, most infamous the snapping turtle—a live creature meant to be killed by the chefs during the battle—, sparked controversy in Western audiences for being prepared in gruesome and inhumane ways.

Initially, a minimum of three dishes was to be prepared, although some challengers have finished only a single dish, and one challenger, Jaques Borie, won with only one dish that met the requirements to be judged; four is the typical number. The record for highest number of dishes prepared for a battle was eight, first set by challenger Kenji Kaji against Iron Chef Michiba in "Battle Umeboshi". Five (later six) servings of each dish are prepared, one each for the chairman and judges, and one for photography and presentation.

=== Assistant chefs ===
Each chef is also given two assistants, who are supposedly students of Kaga's "Gourmet Academy" (in reality, they are students of Hattori Nutrition College). If the challenger does not speak Japanese, students who can speak in the challenger's native language are sometimes provided. In a notable exception, San Francisco chef Ron Siegel struggled with his assistants, who did not speak English. One assistant, Kenichi Miyanaga, became a challenger himself, taking on Iron Chef Morimoto in a sweetfish battle.

=== Commentary and judging ===
Throughout the cook-off, running commentary is made in a booth near the cooking area by an announcer, Kenji Fukui; a commentator, Yukio Hattori, and one or two of the guest judges, with one floor reporter (sometimes two; normally Shinichiro Ohta) providing details of the action on each side. The commentators and judges discuss the style of cooking, culinary traditions and unusual food preparation. At the end of the hour, after end-of-battle interviews with both competitors, each dish is presented to the camera, with a description of its properties (written by the show's screenwriters based on the chef's explanation) read by the announcer. Then, a panel of three (later expanded to four, and later still, five) judges, of which typically one is a professional critic (Early in the run, the judges were dubbed "Bishoku akademī no tokubetsu komon", literally "Special Advisors of the Gourmet Academy"), tastes the dishes and judges them based on taste, presentation, and originality. Each chef may be awarded up to 20 points by each judge, with 10 given for taste and five each for presentation and originality. The chef with the greatest score wins the competition. (In earlier four-judge episodes, the win went to the chef who won three of the four judges, or, failing that, the chef who makes the highest points total.)

Beginning in October 1995, in addition to expanding the number of judges from three to four, a scoring system was issued. As many as 20 points from each judge for a total of 80 could be earned. Below are two examples of how judging and scoring worked:

Contestant	Judge 1	Judge 2	Judge 3	Judge 4	Total	Votes
Challenger	19	19	19	**20**	**77**	1
**Iron Chef**	**20**	**20**	**20**	15	75	**3**

- In this example, the challenger had two more points than the Iron Chef, but the Iron Chef won with three votes over the challenger's single vote.

Contestant	Judge 1	Judge 2	Judge 3	Judge 4	Total	Votes
**Challenger**	18	**19**	19	**20**	**76**	**2**
Iron Chef	**20**	16	**20**	15	71	2

- In this example, both the challenger and the Iron Chef had two votes each, but the challenger won with 76 points over the Iron Chef's 71 points.

Chairman Kaga tastes the dishes along with the judges. While he occasionally makes comments and seeks input from judges during tasting, he generally does not participate in scoring; he did do so, however, during the 2000th Dish Battle. During this episode, a team of French cuisine chefs—captain Hiroyuki Sakai, the original Iron Chef French Yutaka Ishinabe, and former challenger Etsuo Joh—battled a team of Chinese cuisine chefs composed of captain Chen Kenichi, former challenger Sozo Myamoto, and former challenger Yuji Wakiya (who would later be Iron Chef Chinese on the 2012 revival). To break the tie, Chairman Kaga asked them to allow him this one instance of selfishness, and he cast his vote for the French team.

=== Ties ===
In the case of a deadlock (as was possible during the era of the four-judge panel), first place is awarded to the chef with the greater number of points. On the rare occasions that the scores were also tied, an immediate "overtime battle" was held to determine the winner. In overtime, the chefs are given 30 minutes to prepare dishes with a different key ingredient, having to make do with what remains of their pantry or with items that were previously prepared for the main battle. The overtime battles are aired as a separate episode. On one occasion, the overtime battle itself resulted in a tie, prompting Chairman Kaga to declare both the Iron Chef and challenger winners.

== Broadcast history ==
The stage setting for the show, "Kitchen Stadium" (キッチンスタジアム, Kitchin Sutajiamu), the high-quality (and sometimes very expensive) ingredients used in the cooking battles, and Kaga's extravagant costumes required the show to have a budget far higher than those of most other cooking shows. Some statistics: 893 portions of foie gras, 54 sea bream, 827 Ise shrimp, 964 matsutake mushrooms, 4,593 eggs, 1,489 truffles, 4,651 g of caviar, and 84 pieces of shark fin were used during the show, bringing the total grocery bill to ¥843,354,407 (or about $7,115,520). One of the most expensive battles was Battle Swallow's Nest, which ran over $40,000 solely for that ingredient, not counting large quantities of shark's fin; for the battle, the producers were permitted to return any unused portions to Hattori Nutrition College.

=== Final episode and specials ===
For the show's grand finale, aired from September 10, 1999, to September 24, 1999, the Iron Chefs faced off against each other in a three-part battle, with the winner to face French chef Alain Passard, owner of Michelin three-star restaurant L'Arpege, with the winner dubbed the "King of Iron Chefs".

In the first round, Iron Chef Chinese Chen defeated Iron Chef Italian Kobe in Battle Pork (Tokyo X). In the second round, Iron Chef French Sakai defeated Iron Chef Japanese Morimoto in Battle Bell Pepper. In the final match, Sakai defeated Chen in Battle Homard Lobster and was dubbed "King of Iron Chefs". Prior to that episode, Sakai had never won a lobster battle.

In the final bonus match in Kitchen Stadium, with all of the current and previous Iron Chefs looking on, Iron Chef French Sakai defeated Alain Passard in Battle Long-Gang Chicken. Thus, Hiroyuki Sakai was dubbed as both "King of Iron Chefs" and "The No. 1 in the World".

Two reunion specials were produced in 2000. The first was "The Millennium Special"; the second was "New York Special", staged in a makeshift Kitchen Stadium at Webster Hall in New York City, and was the first appearance of Bobby Flay. Dave Spector served as translator and commentator. The New York special also included Michiba and Morimoto on Gordon Elliott's Door Knock Dinners (with footage aired on both shows) surprising a family in Rye by preparing dinner for them with just leftovers and other items in the family's refrigerator. Another reunion episode of the show (entitled "Iron Chef: 21st Century Battle") was produced and broadcast in 2001. A final reunion episode was produced and broadcast in 2002, entitled "The Japan Cup". This special was hosted by celebrity Masahiro Motoki, and began with a mock funeral for the character of Chairman Kaga, citing fugu poisoning as his cause of death.

Sakai, Chen, Kobe and Michiba, along with celebrity chefs including Chen's son Chen Kentaro and Singaporean patissier Janice Wong, also participated in an Iron Chef All Stars charity dinner at the Sydney Opera House in August 2017 that raised AU$26,500 for Opportunity International Australia and was eventually Kobe's last Iron Chef event before his death.

=== United States reception, International Syndication, and U.S. streaming ===
Beginning on September 9, 1995 with Battle Sole from July 7 of that same year, Iron Chef was shown on KTSF in San Francisco, and other stations such as KSCI in Long Beach, Nippon Golden Network in Hawaii, and WMBC-TV in the New York City area following suit, in its original Japanese version with English subtitles, and quickly became a cult hit. In the summer of 1998, the show stopped using subtitles; Fuji TV released a statement saying that the show was intended as a "service to the Japanese community abroad" and due to Japanese copyright laws were to be aired without subtitles, which had previously been provided "inadvertently". KTSF continued to air the show until the station reached the end of its six-year run around February 2000.

While always a success in Japan, Iron Chef became a surprise hit in the United States when it was picked up by the Food Network in 1999, beginning on July 9, and dubbed into English (with the exception of Chairman Kaga), continuing to do so until December 3, 2004. Part of the U.S. appeal was due to the dubbing, which gave the show a campy charm that evoked English-dubbed Chinese kung fu movies of the 1970s. Audiences also found amusing some of the over-the-top culinary concoctions regularly featured on the show, eventually leading to a spoof on Saturday Night Live.

The Japanese channel SKY PerfecTV! has aired extended uncut versions (meaning with the complete hour-long cooking time) of some of the 1994-middle of 1995 episodes, consisting of footage that was not seen on Fuji TV when they originally aired. These extended versions ran for 85 minutes without commercials. Regular episodes were 37 minutes and 30 seconds minus commercials (25 minutes early on), with 48 minutes being typically edited out.

The show was presented in the United States and Canada on the Food Network, dubbed and/or subtitled into English. It was also broadcast on SBS TV in Australia. In the case of SBS, this is unusual as the network has a policy favoring in-house subtitling of acquired programs; it may be felt that the tone given to the show by its American dub is essential to its charms, heightened perhaps by the fact that in most episodes, the flamboyant chairman is subtitled instead of dubbed.

The show was also broadcast on the Finnish channel SubTV, and the Swedish channel TV400 (TV4). Iron Chef was broadcast on Challenge in the UK in 2003 and 2004, as part of its "Japanese Christmas Cracker" and "Japanorama" strands.

The show had again aired in the U.S. on the Fine Living Network from May 5, 2008, until the channel went off the air on May 30, 2010; however, the music from earlier broadcasts, taken from international films such as Backdraft and A Zed & Two Noughts, had been replaced due to music-licensing issues with NBC Universal. The Cooking Channel picked up the series on June 1, 2010, when it replaced Fine Living. The stations that have carried the series, Fine Living, Cooking Channel, and Food Network, are all owned by Scripps Networks Interactive.

FilmRise acquired the exclusive rights to the original Iron Chef episodes in October 2021. The following month, episodes began streaming for free on Paramount's Pluto TV service.

Since the acquisition by FilmRise, Iron Chef has begun to appear on U.S. Streaming services. As of June 2022, this includes FuboTV, PlutoTV, Peacock and Amazon Prime (via Freevee). These episodes are not presented in strict broadcast order; they are dubbed and have different music than the original broadcasts. Two episodes with Masahiko Kondo as a Judge that were shown on Food Network were not listed on FilmRise.

== Notable challengers ==
Certain challengers have made repeat appearances, or have been particularly memorable (including if they were the lone chefs specializing in their particular cuisines in the show's history).

(Japanese names are not in the traditional Japanese style [i.e. family name first] but have been written in standard western style [i.e. family name last].)

- Jacques Borie: An MOF winner. He is the only challenger who beat iron chef Yutaka Ishinabe.
- La Tour d'Argent (Two wins and one draw in four battles) – A historic French restaurant in Paris (dating itself back to 1582) that has a Tokyo branch at the Hotel New Otani open since 1984.
  - Tadaaki Shimazu: a chef who worked at the Tokyo branch, he bested Sakai with homard lobster as the theme.
  - Bernard Leprince (One win in two battles) : a chef at the main Paris branch who faced Nakamura twice, with the chefs winning one each. Leprince won their initial battle during the French Special with salmon as the theme and also won the rematch in Tokyo with duck as the theme.
  - Dominique Corby: a chef at the Tokyo branch, he was the 300th challenger and fought Chen to a draw first with foie gras as the regulation theme and then with asparagus as the overtime theme. He is the only competitor to have tied an Iron Chef twice — once initially and again in the overtime battle. He and Chen were subsequently declared joint winners.
- Arpège (Two wins and one draw in four battles) – a French restaurant in Paris that earned its first Michelin Guide star in its first year after its founding in 1986, its second soon thereafter and a third in 1996, which it has maintained since. It was also ranked 8th in The World's 50 Best Restaurants in 2018.
  - Alain Passard (One win and one draw in three battles): Arpège's owner and head chef. He represented France in the 1997 Iron Chef World Cup in Kyoto and beat American Patrick Clark with homard lobster as the theme before tying Nakamura in the final with foie gras as the theme. Short after his appearance, L'Arpege had received its third Michelin star. In the series finale, Passard was invited to Kitchen Stadium to be the final challenger during the final King of Iron Chefs series, where Sakai bested him with Long Gang chicken as the theme.
  - Tetsuya Shimada: A Japanese French chef who worked at Arpège from 1987 until his return to Japan in 1992, his skills were recognized by Passard, who made him a seafood specialist while at Arpège. Also a member of Club Mistral (see below), Sakai also beat him with black truffles as the theme.
- Cheng Kazuhiko: A Chinese chef and the first challenger to win in Kitchen Stadium after he bested Chen in the sixth episode with octopus as the theme
- Tadamichi Ōta: defeated Iron Chef Sakai in an octopus battle, in which Sakai was particularly squeamish about handling the live creatures. Later became the leader of the "Ōta Faction" (大田軍団) of traditional Japanese chefs. The Ōta Faction regularly challenged Iron Chef Morimoto and his neo-Japanese style, winning one out of five battles. Ōta Faction was the name used in the translated version shown on Food Network. In the original Japanese version (shown in the U.S. and transcribed by the Iron Chef Reporter in southern California) the group is called Ōta's Party of Heaven and Earth (OPHE; 大田天地の会). Every time he appeared, Fukui would point out that he was not related to Shinichiro Ohta, the show's floor reporter.
- Kyoko Kagata (One win in two battles): A French chef, the first female chef to appear on the show and the youngest chef to be victorious after beating Chen with scallops as the theme. Four years later, after experiencing a midlife crisis, she challenged Chen again. This time, with veal as the theme, Chen won by 19–17 on Kishi's scorecard and 20–19 on the others.

An interesting side note is that the second female challenger, cooking show host Katsuyo Kobayashi, also faced Chen. Kobayashi indirectly picked Chen because she allowed Kaga to pick for her. Chen lost both battles, and purportedly caught some flak from chef-friends of his. Chen fought another two female challengers in separate battles and won.

- Cho Chiyo: An okonomiyaki turned Cantonese chef from Kobe who helped feed those suffering hardship after the city was devastated by the Great Hanshin Earthquake. Kaga invited her to battle in recognition of her bravery and so that she could cook to her heart's content, and she challenged Chen, who prevailed with tofu as the theme.
- Toshiro Kandagawa (three wins out of six battles): Regular challenger who aligned himself with the Ōta Faction, a group of hardline traditionalists in Japanese cuisine, and often led his army of fellow chefs and protegés into Kitchen Stadium during challenges. Kandagawa has taken part in several battles wherein he supported apprentices to battle an Iron Chef (only one out of the ten won). Kandagawa also participated in several "battle special" episodes, including the 21st Century Battle. Rokusaburo Michiba was his main rival until Michiba's retirement as Iron Chef Japanese; he has recorded victories over Chen, Nakamura and Sakai.
- Pierre Gagnaire: The owner and head chef of the eponymous Michelin 3-star Pierre Gagnaire in Paris, Gagnaire represented France in the 1995 Iron Chef World Cup at Ariake Coliseum but lost to eventual runner-up Gianfranco Vissani with tuna as the theme ingredient. He was later under financial pressure as the French economic downturn threatened to close the restaurant, and Kaga was moved to organize the France Battle Special to rekindle Gagnaire's spirit. He then proceeded to defeat Sakai with lobster as the theme. Gagnaire has since opened another restaurant bearing his name in Tokyo as part of his ventures, operating since 2005.
- Rory Kennedy: The head chef of Rules in Covent Garden, London and the lone British challenger on the show. He and Sakai battled to a draw with rabbit as the theme, with Sakai prevailing in overtime with pigeon as the theme.
- Bobby Flay: Flay entered into a bit of a rivalry with Iron Chef Japanese Morimoto during the show's special New York Battle. Flay complained that his side of the kitchen was poorly laid out (it was noted in an Iron Chef America "Behind the Scenes" episode that the kitchen was hastily set up in the provided forum). At one point Flay received an electric shock, transmitted by a wet floor and faulty wiring, when he grabbed a metal pan on the range. When Flay stood on his cutting board at the end of the battle, Morimoto declared that Flay was "not a chef" for disregarding the cleanliness of one's cutting board. Morimoto won, but Flay was offered a rematch. He accepted, and got his revenge, in the 21st Century Battle in Japan, where, at battle's end, he tossed the cutting board off the counter before climbing on it, so as not to offend Morimoto again. Flay then became an Iron Chef alongside Morimoto on Iron Chef America. This rivalry was revisited for a third time with Morimoto defeating Flay during the Holiday Ice Battle (Iron Chef America, November 2009)
- Ron Siegel: A French/California cuisine chef who was head chef of Charles Nob Hill in San Francisco when he bested Sakai with lobster as the theme to become the first American challenger to win in Kitchen Stadium. Mayor Willie Brown had personally recommended Siegel to be on the show.
- Michael Noble: The lone Canadian challenger and an award winner in the Bocuse d'Or, who was head chef at the Metropolitan Hotel in Vancouver when he challenged Morimoto in Battle Potato in 1999 with Morimoto winning 3–1.
- Wayne Nish: A Japanese-American chef (his grandfather is from Yamaguchi Prefecture), New York native and the head chef at March, a highly rated restaurant on Manhattan's Upper East Side. Sakai bested him with apples as the theme, with the battle also being notable because it was the only one that regular color commentator Yukio Hattori judged.
- Serie A (セリエＡ; also known as the "Big Leaguers"): A group of Italian chefs working in Japan who took their name from the top flight of Italian football and frequently challenged Iron Chef Italian Kobe: Mario Frittoli, Constantino Gemmoli, and Franco Canzoniere. No group member ever defeated Kobe, although one member did defeat Morimoto.
  - Marco Paolo Molinari: A member of Serie A and a world pasta champion who prevailed over Morimoto with porcini mushrooms as the theme, making him ultimately the only Italian challenger to beat an Iron Chef. Utilized a block of marble that was first heated using alcohol spray and a torch and then cooled with dry ice while creating and kneading his dough, which bewildered Morimoto.
- Joël Bruant (One win in two battles): A Tokyo-based French chef considered a French culinary ambassador to Japan, he was vice chairman of the Acaedemie Culinaire de France and a top apprentice to Paul Bocuse. He and Marashi Furutaka beat Michiba and Chen in a doubles match with sea bass as the theme, but Sakai beat him with salmon as the theme.
- Club Mistral (クラブミストラル): A group of young specialists in French cuisine. They mainly targeted Iron Chef French Sakai as a member of Club des Trentes – one of their competing groups composed of more established French chefs that included Sakai, Ishinabe and challenger Etsuo Jō – in a similar fashion, although they took on Iron Chef Chinese Chen and Iron Chef French Ishinabe once each as well. Only one of them managed a win (Kazutaka Okabe versus Sakai, in a lamb battle) despite several attempts.
- Tatsuo Umemiya: An actor, tarento (including on restaurant variety shows) and businessman. He lost to Michiba with horse mackerel as the theme but was invited back as a judge for some subsequent battles including the King of Iron Chefs series finale.
- Heichinrou (One win out of three battles): The oldest restaurant in Yokohama Chinatown sent three challengers to challenge Chen in 1998 and 1999 after deeming him worthy of their challenge. Chen beat cooking coach Hisao Yaginuma with bok choy as the theme and Mitsuo Suganuma (the first Japanese chef to head a Heichinrou branch) with shark fin as the theme before Xie Huaxian, the restaurant's grand chef, won with spiny lobster as the theme.
- Dr. Yukio Hattori: A gentlemen's agreement went on between the Chairman of Gourmet Academy (Kaga) and the President of Culinary Academy (Hattori) where the Doctor agreed to battle an Iron Chef. If he won, he would be given a spot alongside the Iron Chefs and if he lost he would keep working for Kaga. As he remained a commentator until the end of the series, one can easily deduce the outcomes of his two battles. Joël Robuchon was invited as a guest judge for the event, and Honorary Iron Chef Ishinabe served in a commentary role in Hattori's place for the battle. Hattori also battled - and lost to - Nakamura in his final battle (tuna-themed) owing to the longstanding Hattori-Nadaban rivalry.
- Takashi Saitō (not to be confused with the baseball player): The top apprentice of Chen's father Chen Kenmin who also coached Kenichi after Kenmin died and then challenged him with prawns at the theme. Both chefs recreated one of Kenmin's signatures, prawns in chili sauce – Saito recreated Kenmin's original recipe, while Kenichi recreated his father's modern version of the dish (with ketchup, which he then served Canapé Style) and went on to win. In the 2000th Dish Special, Kaga said that Chen's prawns were his favorite dish to that point, and Chen himself also said it was the battle he remembered most including because it was the one battle that his mother Yoko watched in person.
- Isao Makio: A French chef who was a classmate of Sakai's at Izumi Municipal Junior High School in Kagoshima Prefecture, the two sat next to each other but barely talked, though the two were also on the same train to seek jobs and got off at different stations. After Sakai returned to Kagoshima to visit his parents' grave and unexpectedly reunited with his class and teacher, the class relayed his wish to meet Sakai and challenge him, which would be the first time they had met in 40 years. Sakai prevailed with Kagoshima black pig as the theme and the class in attendance.
- Lin Kunbi (no wins in two battles): A celebrity Fuchien Chinese chef who battled Michiba to a draw with potatoes as the theme, leading to the very first overtime in show history where Michiba prevailed with sweet potatoes as the theme. He later also faced Nakamura, who won with bell peppers as the theme.
- Kenichi Miyanaga: A graduate of Hattori Nutrition College who was also an assistant for several Kitchen Stadium Battles and eventually hired by Michiba after Michiba retired as an active Iron Chef and after Miyanaga graduated. Michiba chose him to face Morimoto in a battle to also push Morimoto, and Morimoto won with sweetfish as the theme.
- Yūji Wakiya (one win in three battles): A master of "neo-Chinese" cuisine, Wakiya lost to Iron Chef Sakai in Battle Sea Urchin but defeated Iron Chef Chen with papayas. He later became part of Chen's All-Chinese team alongside Sozo Miyamoto for the 2000th Dish Special. He was also named the second Iron Chef Chinese in the Millennium Cup and was supposed to take over Chen's place, but he never actually battled under the new title until the first episode of the 2012 revival.
- Etsuo Jō (two wins in three battles): A French chef famous for his sauces. Michiba defeated him with broccoli as the theme, but he then bested Sakai with wine as the theme. He was also chosen to be the third member of Sakai's All-French team for the 2000th Dish Special alongside Ishinabe.
- Sozo Miyamoto (no wins in two battles): A Shanghai cuisine chef and a rival of Chen's who, like him, won a silver award representing Japan in the World Chinese Cooking Championship in 1992. Chen won with carp as the theme, but Miyamoto was also invited to join him on the All-Chinese team for the 2000th Dish Special alongside Wakiya.
- Li Jinlun: A Cantonese chef working in Tokyo after being been the head chef at Fook Lam Moon, a famous Cantonese restaurant in Hong Kong. Chen bested him with swallow's nest ($24,000 worth) as the theme.
- Kazunari Takeda: the first challenger defeat Iron Chef Masahiko Kobe in 30 minutes overtime battle with the theme ingredient Pink Prawn. He first tied with Masahiko Kobe during the battle of Cod Soft Roe and finally he made way to the 30 minutes overtime battle and won.
- Liang Shuqing: Liang Shueng's younger brother became the second challenger to defeat Iron Chef Chen Kenichi in 30 minutes overtime battle with the theme ingredient Konnyaku. He first tied with Chen Kenichi during the battle of Pork belly and finally he made way to the 30 minutes overtime battle and won.
- Masahiko Hagiwara (One win in two battles): An Italian chef and pasta specialist. Chen beat him with scampi as the theme, but he bested Kobe with short pasta as the theme in Kobe's debut, making him the only challenger to win against a debuting Iron Chef.
- Kentaro: Katsuyo Kobayashi's son who wants to defeat Iron Chef Chen Kenichi like his mother did before. He first appeared in his mother's cook show at the age of 5 and at age 25 he further his skills in art, music and cooking. During the battle with Iron Chef Chen Kenichi he refused to use the same recipes like his mother. Chen beat Kentaro in the new potatoes battle.
- Shinya Tasaki: The winner of the Association de la Sommellerie Internationale's Meilleur Sommelier du Monde (World's Best Sommelier) in Tokyo in 1995, the first (and as of 2020, still only) Asian national to win the competition. Also president of the Association as of 2013. Tasaki is also the only non-professional chef to have won in Kitchen Stadium after defeating Kobe with fatty tuna as the theme. Though it was not a stipulation of the battle, by virtue of his being a sommelier, both he and Kobe chose wines to pair with their dishes. Also invited to perform sommelier duties during the series finale.
- Sotetsu Fujii: The high priest of the Fushikian Temple in Kamakura and a Shojin vegetarian chef, who Sakai bested with yams as the theme.
- Hiroshi Furusho: A French chef (including a specialty in Cajun cuisine) and a favorite of the Tokyo Yakult Swallows, including manager Katsuya Nomura, a recurring judge who recommended him for the show. Nomura and a number of players attended his appearance, where Michiba prevailed with turkey as the theme.
- Jun'ichi Itō: The first challenger not classified as a chef specializing in any specific cuisine, he started French cooking at age 18 and left for France at age 28. He left for Italy three years later and joined Enoteca Pinchiorri, where Kobe had also trained. When he was 35, he opened his restaurant Herle Quin in Tokyo. Food critic Asako Kishi, the show's most frequent judge by dishes tasted, recommended him as a challenger before Chen won with yogurt as the theme.
- Kensuke Sakai: An Italian chef, but most notable because his restaurant "Nigiro" was (at time of taping in 1998) really a food stand that he brings in by hand to a monastery's yard each night – he had been cited 30 times by Tokyo police before coming to the arrangement with the monastery. At his introduction, Sakai brought the food cart into Kitchen Stadium. Kobe bested him with pumpkin as the theme.
- Chihiro Otsuki: One of just two Spanish cuisine challengers in the show's history, who had won awards for her cooking in Spain. Chen won by just a single point with tomatoes as the theme.
- Yosei Watanabe: The lone Mexican cuisine chef to be a challenger on the show and the chef who opened the first authentic Mexican restaurant in Tokyo, who Kobe bested with mangoes as the theme.
- Senji Osada: A sous vide specialist, who Sakai bested with scallops as a theme. A vacuum machine was stalled on either side of Kitchen Stadium for the battle, and Osada used it for all of his dishes while Sakai also used it for two of his.
- Lee Myong-suk: A Royal Korean cuisine chef and the lone Korean challenger on the show, she went on to become an executive chef at the Culinary Institute of California. Chen was victorious in their battle with liver as the theme.
- Hironobu Tsujiguchi: A patissier who became the youngest champion of the World Cup of Desserts, he was the first and only challenger to win a dessert battle out of seven after he prevailed over Kobe with chocolate and bananas as the themes.
- Tetsutoshi Shimazu: An Italian chef and the first challenger specializing in pizza. Chen bested him with squid as the theme but worried during the battle as Shimazu was making his pizza that he himself might not have a dish that would beat it.
- Gillian Hirst: A chef from Brisbane who was the lone Australian challenger in the show's history. Nakamura bested her with ostrich as the theme by a single point.
- Takashi Mera (One win in two battles): A chef who used the longest knife in the country, almost twice the 8-inch average length used by other Japanese chefs. He lost to Michiba with tuna as the theme but was invited back for a rematch and bested Nakamura with wakame seaweed as the theme.
- Kiyotaka Ikegawa: A sumo rikishi known as Fuyoho who turned chef after an injury cut his sumo career short. Chen bested him with horsehair crab as the theme.
- Other female challengers include Fuyuko Kondō, Kandagawa protégée Yoshie Urabe, Yoshiko Takemasa, Katsuko Nanao, Kumiko Kobayashi, Miyoko Sakai and Chinese Cui Yufen. Among the women listed above, only Cui won in her battle (coincidentally against Chen).

== Notable judges ==
The result of a battle may be influenced by the lineup of judges, which changes from show to show. A list of some of the more notable judges, some of which were previous Iron Chefs or challengers, includes:

These names are not in the traditional East Asian style [i.e. family name first] but have been written in standard western style [i.e. family name last], as they appeared on the English dub of the show.

- Akebono, Yokozuna
- Asako Kishi, a.k.a. the "East German Judge", a food critic and nutritionist. She tasted the most dishes after Kaga, according to the 2000th Plate special episode.
- Chua Lam, Hong Kong gourmet and VP of Golden Harvest
- Jackie Chan, actor and martial artist
- Joël Robuchon, a French chef who was called "Chef of the Century" by the guide Gault Millau; he also trained the 200th challenger, Maurice Guillouët
- Julie Dreyfus, French actress, she refused to taste one dish prepared by Toshiro Kandagawa because it contained whale meat.
- Katsuya Nomura, Nippon Professional Baseball catcher and manager
- Kazuhiro Sasaki, Yokohama BayStars (and later Seattle Mariners) closer
- Kazuko Hosoki, popular fortune teller and author of best-selling books.
- Kazushige Nagashima, a.k.a. "Junior", former pro baseball player and sports commentator
- Keiko Saito, actress
- Kenji Fukui, the show's regular announcer and play-by-play commentator, who was also a judge for the 2000th Dish Special
- KORN (born as Nobuaki Kondo), a Japanese rap artist
- Masaaki Hirano, Rosanjin scholar
- Mayuko Takata, actress
- Mitsuko Ishii, newscaster
- Nagisa Oshima, film director
- Pierre Troisgros, a legendary French chef who judged the France Battle special; he also trained one challenger, Ryozo Azao
- Rokusaburo Michiba, Iron Chef Japanese I and Iron Chef Emeritus, who returned as a judge during King of Iron Chefs
- Ryuichi Sakamoto, musician, composer, producer and actor
- Ryutaro Hashimoto, former Prime Minister of Japan, judge for the final battle
- Shigesato Itoi, famous director, writer, producer and video game designer, creator of the Mother series
- Shinichiro Kurimoto, member of the Japanese House of Representatives
- Takehiko Bessho, Nippon Professional Baseball pitcher, manager and commentator
- Tamio Kageyama, novelist
- Tatsuo Umemiya, actor, tarento and challenger
- Tenmei Kanoh, photographer
- Tim and Nina Zagat, the founders of the Zagat Survey, who also helped organize and judge the New York Battle
- Toshiki Kaifu, former Prime Minister of Japan
- Ukyo Katayama, former Formula One driver
- Yasushi Akimoto, lyricist and music producer
- Yoko Akino, actress and cookbook author, who also featured in a TV Tokyo special featuring Sakai, Chen and Michiba visiting and cooking in Shanghai, Seoul and Ho Chi Minh City
- Yoshirō Mori, Lower House member
- Yoshiko Ishii, chanson singer
- Yukio Hatoyama, Leader of the Opposition and future Prime Minister of Japan
- Dr. Yukio Hattori, Hattori Nutrition College president, challenger and the show's regular color commentator
- Yutaka Ishinabe, Iron Chef French I, who returned as a judge during King of Iron Chefs

== Notable dishes ==
During the 2,000th Dish Battle, Chairman Kaga selected the five best and three worst dishes from the history of the show.

Five best dishes

- Prawns in Chili Sauce, Canapé Style (Iron Chef Chen Kenichi)
- Foie Gras and Flatfish with Citrus Sauce (Iron Chef Rokusaburo Michiba)
- Foie Gras and Scallops in Cabbage (Challenger Hiromi Yamada)
- Sea Eel Royale with Truffle Sauce (Iron Chef Hiroyuki Sakai)
- Scallop Salad with Vinaigrette Sauce (Challenger Maurice Guillouet)

Three worst dishes

- Smoked Asparagus Stick Salad (Iron Chef Masaharu Morimoto), the asparagus was so strongly smoked and bitter that all judges commented negatively.
- Potato Dumpling Soup (Iron Chef Komei Nakamura), the smell of foie gras killed the aroma of the potatoes and nobody was able to finish it. Both chefs in that match reached a no-decision, therefore the match was restarted.
- Soft Roe in Sake with Truffles (Challenger and commentator Yukio Hattori), gave Joël Robuchon the wrong impression of Japanese sake.

== 2012 revival ==
Iron Chef
- アイアンシェフ
- Genre: Cooking show
- Presented by: Hiroshi Tamaki; Mizuki Sano; Yukio Hattori
- Theme music composer: Akira Senju
- Country of origin: Japan
- Original language: Japanese
- No. of seasons: 2
- No. of episodes: 14 (list of episodes)

Original release
- Network: Fuji Television (Japan)
- Release: October 26, 2012 – July 4, 2013

In 2012, Fuji Television announced that it was recording new episodes of Iron Chef. The first episode debuted on October 26, 2012, as a two-hour special, thereafter reverting to a one-hour show airing on Friday evenings at 19:57 Japan time. Unlike the original Ryōri no Tetsujin, the new show was titled Iron Chef (アイアンシェフ) in katakana characters. The chairman's role was assumed by Japanese actor Hiroshi Tamaki. Fuji TV commentator Mizuki Sano hosted the program, and the reporters were Yurika Mita and Daisuke Miyagawa. Dr. Yukio Hattori returned from the original Iron Chef series to provide commentary. Three new Iron Chefs were chosen; Jun Kurogi as Iron Chef Japanese, Yūji Wakiya as Iron Chef Chinese, and Yōsuke Suga as Iron Chef French.

The first battle in the new show was a two-hour special with two battles. The first challenger was former Kitchen Stadium challenger (referred as "nominee") Kenichi Miyanaga, recommended by Iron Chef Rokusaburo Michiba. Miyanaga is Michiba's top apprentice and battled Iron Chef Suga. The challenger ("nominee") in the second battle was Kentaro Chen, recommended by his father Iron Chef Chen Kenichi, who battled Iron Chef Wakiya.

It was announced, after airing thirteen episodes, that the new run of Iron Chef would be discontinued after the last episode on March 22, 2013. Mr. Tatematsu, General Manager of Editing, explained, "Iron Chef is a high quality show and we can say it is FujiTV's treasure. Currently we are struggling for the ratings. We think we have a time slot problem, too, so we would like to consider about a way to make it as special program and forward it into the next stage." On July 3, 2013, the Iron Chefs reunited for an American Chef Special with beef as the secret ingredient. All three Iron Chefs were paired with an American challenger, and then for a fourth round, all six competed. Currently, there are no plans for any more Iron Chef specials.

=== Iron Chef 2012 statistics ===
Iron Chef	Title	Wins	Losses	Draws	No Contests	Total	Win %
Jun Kurogi (黒木純, Kurogi Jun)	Iron Chef Japanese	4	2	0	0	6	66.7%
Yūji Wakiya (脇屋 友詞, Wakiya Yūji)	Iron Chef Chinese	5	2	0	0	7	71.4%
Yōsuke Suga (須賀 洋介, Suga Yōsuke)	Iron Chef French	5	2	0	0	7	71.4%

== International editions ==
=== Iron Chef America ===
==== Iron Chef USA ====
Around Christmas 2001, the UPN network presented two one-hour episodes of Iron Chef USA hosted by William Shatner as "The Chairman of the American Culinary Academy". Competition took place inside "Kitchen Arena" (built in Garden Arena in the Las Vegas MGM Grand Hotel). Commentary was provided by Michael Burger and Anthony Dias Blue, with floor reporting by Sissy Biggers. The show featured four Iron Chefs: Iron Chef American Todd English (whose specialty is actually Mediterranean food), Iron Chef French Jean Francois Meteigner, Iron Chef Italian Alessandro Stratta, and Iron Chef Asian Roy Yamaguchi. In the show's only two battles, English defeated Kerry Simon in a dungeness crab battle, and Stratta defeated Marcus Samuelsson in a turkey battle.

These shows were neither a critical nor popular success, perhaps because the show focused little on cooking—a major part of the Japanese program. The show had a small audience section with bleachers, and the audience yelled relentlessly during the show (sounding much like a sports audience). Shatner walked around the kitchen sampling the more expensive items, the chefs refused to say what they were doing, and the cameras rarely showed the food preparation.

==== Iron Chef America ====
In 2004, Food Network announced that it would air an Iron Chef special, called "Iron Chef America: Battle of the Masters", featuring Sakai and Morimoto dueling with American Iron Chefs Bobby Flay, Mario Batali, and Wolfgang Puck, all Food Network personalities and renowned American celebrity chefs. (Morimoto and Flay battled in two previous Iron Chef specials that were made after the original series aired.) The specials featured Alton Brown as the announcer and Mark Dacascos playing the role of The Chairman (in the storyline, this chairman is the nephew of Takeshi Kaga).

The show received high ratings and rave reviews and in October 2004, and Food Network began taping weekly episodes that premiered starting in January 2005. Some changes were made to the show, most notably replacing Puck with Morimoto as an Iron Chef (a fourth Iron Chef, Cat Cora, was added later), and the location was moved from Los Angeles to New York City. The fifth Iron Chef, Michael Symon, was added after his win in The Next Iron Chef. In 2009, Chef Jose Garces became the sixth Iron Chef following his own victory in the second season of that show. In 2010, Chef Marc Forgione won its third season, becoming the seventh Iron Chef on Iron Chef America. Chef Geoffrey Zakarian won that show's fourth season in 2011, making him the eighth Iron Chef. In 2012, Chef Alexandra Guarnaschelli, who had served as Sous Chef on Iron Chef episodes, became the ninth after winning the fifth season of The Next Iron Chef, while Stephanie Izard became the tenth and final Iron Chef.

Even though both Todd English and Kerry Simon from Iron Chef USA competed on Iron Chef America, the episodes did not mention their IC-USA appearances.

==== Iron Chef Gauntlet ====
Iron Chef Gauntlet is a two-season reformat of Iron Chef America where seven chefs from around the country compete in an elimination contest, with the last chef remaining facing a "gauntlet" challenge of defeating three other Iron Chefs in order to earn the title. It aired from 2017 to 2018

==== Iron Chef Showdown ====
Iron Chef Showdown was a reimagining of America that also aired on Food Network for a single season of 10 episodes from 2017 to 2018.

==== Iron Chef: Quest for an Iron Legend ====
Iron Chef: Quest for an Iron Legend premiered on Netflix on June 15, 2022. Brown and Dacascos return to their respective roles, with Brown joined by Kristen Kish as co-host. There are eight episodes.

=== Iron Chef Israel ===
==== Krav Sakinim ====
In 2007, Krav Sakinim (Hebrew: קרב סכינים, Knife Fight), a show based on Iron Chef, began airing on Israel's Channel 10. Each episode features a different prominent Israeli chef, who competes against one of the show's featured foreign chefs. All Israeli winners compete against one another in the finals and the winner competes against a foreign chef for the title of season champion. Season 1 featured only French chef Stéphane Froidevaux, who won the season's finale, while season 2 saw the inclusion of Italian chef Alfredo Russo, meaning both Michelin star holders would have to compete against each other for a spot in the final bout. The show is actively hosted by actor Oded Menashe and the regular commentators are chef Yaron Kastenboim and catering company owner Ran Shmueli. While in season 1, the panel of judges was made up mostly of celebrities from the entertainment industry, season 2 features renowned persons from the culinary industry, such as restaurant critics and chefs. The competitors prepare a three-course meal, with each dish given a score of up to 10 points by each member of the panel and commentators, accumulating up to 150 points per chef (compared to 90 points in season 1, where the commentators had relatively more points to give).

=== Iron Chef UK ===
In 2010, UK public television network Channel 4 debuted Iron Chef UK, based on Iron Chef. The show airs five days a week, and is hosted by Olly Smith and Nick Nairn. The four Iron Chefs are Tom Aikens, Martin Blunos, Sanjay Dwivedi and Judy Joo. Like the original Iron Chef, the competitions are held in Kitchen Stadium and presided over by The chairman. Judging occurs in two rounds, with the first round being appetizers, and the second being the main courses. Two challengers prepare the appetizer, producing one appetizer each, while the Iron Chef prepares two. These are judged, and the standing for the team versus the Iron Chef are announced. Then the second half begins: the challenging team and the Iron Chef return to the kitchen to prepare the main course. The two challengers each prepare one dish, while the Iron Chef prepares two. Judging resumes, and the results are announced. Either the Challenging team wins, or the Iron Chef wins in overall score, and the best dish from the challenging team is also announced. The challengers with the best dish returns on Friday to compete against the best Iron Chef of the week.

=== Iron Chef Australia ===
The Seven Network announced in August 2010 that an Australian version was planned, in part to capitalize on the success of the highly popular MasterChef Australia.

The Australian Iron Chefs were Neil Perry, Guy Grossi and Guillaume Brahimi, while the show features a static judging panel composed of food critics Larissa Dubecki, Simon Thomsen and Leo Schofield. Mark Dacascos reprises his role as The chairman from Iron Chef America, and the program is hosted by Grant Denyer, with additional commentary provided by Richard Cornish.

Iron Chef Australia began airing on October 19, 2010, attracting an audience of 1.13 million viewers for its first episode. It was cancelled at the end of its first season.

=== Iron Chef Thailand ===
On January 25, 2012, the first ever episode of Iron Chef Thailand broadcast on BBTV Channel 7 and is produced by Heliconia H Group. Santi Svetavimala played his role as chairman of this version from inception until his departure on March 21, 2020, after 8 years of initial launch. In this version of Iron Chef, there are four Iron Chefs: Chumpol Chaengprai (Thai cuisine), Boontham Pakpo (Japanese cuisine), Pongtawat "Ian" Chalermkittichai (Western cuisine) and Chaitep "Mr. Lee" Pattarapornpaisarn (Chinese cuisine). The program is hosted by Shahkrit Yamnam and the field reporter is DJ Pong (Nattapong Taengkasem). The format is different at first version, in the first half of the program, there are three challengers who competing with each other to find out who is the best chef, the winner will competing against the Iron Chef on the second half of the program, this format was used for only three episodes.

On February 22, 2012, the format of Iron Chef Thailand was changed to: the first 30 minutes of the program is where the Challenger Chef will present his/her "Signature Dish with a Special Ingredient" to the guests. Then followed by the actual "Iron Chef Battle" in similar to Iron Chef Japan where the host will asked the Challenger Chef to select the Iron Chef he/she wants to challenge, after the Challenger Chef has selected the Iron Chef, the chairman will reveal the "Secret Ingredient" and once the Chairman says "Allez Cuisine" the battle begins. The battle time is 60 minutes, where they will need to complete at least four dishes, the order in which Chefs present to the judges will be determined by a coin toss conducted by the host. The last 30 minutes of the program is "Cooking with Iron Chef" segment, guests learned how to cook from the Iron Chef and win the "Best Student" at the end of the program.

The program underwent to several major changes since after first format revamped in February 2012 with further changes on the set in April 2015 which introduced new Iron Chefs to the stage. By November 2017 saw changes to the host, after Shahkrit Yamnam leaves from his role and their set were revamped. The most recent format revamped of Iron Chef Thailand was on June 18, 2022, with more modern set arrived to the stage, and introduced "One-On-One Battle" and "Fast & Delicious" segments, at the end of this program, a higher score from the judges who given to the winner as Challenger Chef will received Iron Chef Trophy to the program.

Iron Chef Thailand is now a longest-tenure franchise program from outside of Japan as originator, following the cancellation of Iron Chef America and even adopted "The Next Iron Chef Thailand" as reality program in similar to American format.

=== Iron Chef Vietnam ===
The Vietnamese version was aired from June 6, 2012, on VTV3. In this version there are only three Iron Chefs: David Thái, Long Chef and Yu Zhi Da. The ultimate winner would be a 2013 Iron Chef.

=== Iron Chef Indonesia ===
There have been two adaptations of Iron Chef for Indonesian television.

==== Allez Cuisine ====
The first Indonesian adaptation of Iron Chef series, also known as Allez Cuisine, which came from Chairman Kaga's catchphrase in the original series, was aired on Indosiar from March 1, 2003, until August 12, 2006. The Kitchen Stadium owner role was played by Derry Drajat, and the main commentator was Gunardjo, an Indonesian food expert. The show featured three Super Chefs or Iron Chefs. Episodes were 1 hour long. The show also featured a mini-game segment with 6 competitors featuring the main ingredient of the episode. The mini game segment usually lasts for 2 minutes. After the main cooking segment was finished, the Super Chef will give verdict on the results of the mini-game and declare the mini-game winner.

==== Iron Chef Indonesia ====
The second Iron Chef series, also known as Iron Chef Indonesia, was aired on RCTI from April 22, 2017, until November 19, 2017. Just like the first series, the concept of this show was still a battle between one of the three Super Chefs or Iron Chefs that has been selected by a Challenger Chef to serve the three or four dishes with a predetermined main ingredients. The winner will be announced by the chairman based on the scores that have been given by the guest judges. The chairman role was played by Edward Akbar, the field reporter by Yuda Bustara, and the commentator by Kevindra Prianto Soemantri, with guest judges selected from chefs, celebrities, businesspersons, and executives every week.

=== Iron Chef Canada ===
On October 17, 2018, Iron Chef Canada premiered on Food Network Canada, the first Iron Chef spin-off in Canada.

The chairman in this version is Jai West (in the storyline, the chairman is the grandnephew of Takeshi Kaga). It is hosted by Gail Simmons, with play-by-play done by floor reporter Chris Nuttall-Smith. The Iron Chefs in this version include Hugh Acheson, Amanda Cohen, Lynn Crawford, Rob Feenie, Susur Lee, and Anna Olson.

The competition is similar to early seasons ofIron Chef America, with two key differences introduced in that show's latter seasons:

1) Both the Iron Chef and the challenger must serve their first dish to the panel of judges within the first 20 minutes of competition (the Chairman does not taste these dishes). This dish is scored separately from the remainder of the dishes.

2) With 30 minutes remaining in the competition, the Chairman introduces a "culinary curve ball", a kitchen device or an additional ingredient which the chefs must use for at least one of their remaining dishes.

=== Iron Chef: Brazil ===
Iron Chef: Brazil was first announced alongside Quest for an Iron Legend and Mexico. The series debuted on August 10, 2022.

=== Iron Chef Mexico ===
Iron Chef Mexico premiered on Netflix on September 21, 2022.

=== Iron Chef KH ===
Iron Chef KH (Iron Chef Cambodia) is a professional cooking competition TV show broadcast on Hang Meas HDTV. It features top local and international chefs—such as Chef Kimsan, Chef Mardy and Chef Tim Pheak—competing in timed culinary challenges using secret ingredients under high pressure.

== VHS Releases ==
In 1995, Pony Canyon released nine VHS tapes related to the show, consisting of three different sets, and three volumes for each of them. They were as follows:

料理の鉄人 第一巻 和の鉄人 道場六三郎 (Ryōri no tetsujin daiikkan wa no tetsujin michiba rokusaburō; literally Iron Chef Volume 1: Japanese Iron Chef Rokusaburo Michiba) PCVG-10144
料理の鉄人 第二巻 中華の鉄人 陳建一 (Ryōri no tetsujin dainikan chūka no tetsujin chin ken'ichi; literally Iron Chef Volume 2: Chinese Iron Chef Chen Kenichi) PCVG-10145
料理の鉄人 第三巻 フレンチの鉄人 坂井宏行 (Ryōri no tetsujin daisankan furenchi no tetsujin sakai hiroyuki; literally Iron Chef Volume 3: French Iron Chef Hiroyuki Sakai) PCVG-10146

料理の鉄人2 第一巻 和の鉄人 道場のレシピ (Ryōri no tetsujin 2 daiikkan wa no tetsujin michiba no reshipi; literally Iron Chef 2, Volume 1: Japanese Iron Chef Michiba's Recipes) PCVG-10165
料理の鉄人2 第二巻 中華の鉄人 陳のレシピ (Ryōri no tetsujin 2 dainikan chūka no tetsujin Chin no reshipi; literally Iron Chef 2, Volume 2: Chinese Iron Chef Chen's Recipes) PCVG-10166
料理の鉄人2 第三巻 フレンチの鉄人 坂井のレシピ (Ryōri no tetsujin 2 daisankan furenchi no tetsujin Sakai no reshipi; literally Iron Chef 2, Volume 3: French Iron Chef Sakai's Recipes) PCVG-10167

料理の鉄人3 ザ・ベスト・オブ・道場 (Ryōri no tetsujin 3 za besuto Obu michiba; literally Iron Chef 3: The Best of Michiba) PCVG-10176
料理の鉄人3 ザ・ベスト・オブ・陳 (Ryōri no tetsujin 3 za besuto Obu Chin; literally Iron Chef 3: The Best of Chen) PCVG-10177
料理の鉄人3 ザ・ベスト・オブ・坂井 (Ryōri no tetsujin 3 za besuto Obu Sakai; literally Iron Chef 3: The Best of Sakai) PCVG-10178

== Video game ==
On February 23, 1996, Hamlet released a video game based on the show for the Sega Saturn titled 料理の鉄人 KITCHEN STADIUM TOUR (Ryōri no tetsujin KITCHEN sutajiamu tsuā, literally Iron Chef: Kitchen Stadium Tour). The game was developed by Scitron & Art. Players could tour a CGI simulation of the Kitchen Stadium set, look up information on Chefs' restaurants, view ten battles, and read information on an Iron Chef's stats. The information provided for the game was as recent as October 1995.
