= Masahiko Kobe =

Japanese chef (1969–2019)

- Born: October 15, 1969; Yamanashi, Japan
- Died: March 14, 2019 (aged 49); Tokyo, Japan
- Culinary career
- Cooking style: Italian cuisine
- Television show: Iron Chef

Masahiko Kobe (神戸 勝彦, Kōbe Masahiko; October 15, 1969 – March 14, 2019) was a celebrity chef specializing in Italian cuisine, most notable as the "Iron Chef Italian" on the television series Iron Chef, where he appeared wearing a chef's uniform decorated like the Italian Flag (green, white and red) and holding a tomato (in some episodes, an apple).

== Biography ==
According to the Iron Chef storylines, Kobe was slated to be an Iron Chef in 1993, but was considered too young and immature. To fix this issue, he moved to Italy for about 4 years to train, becoming the fourth Iron Chef upon his arrival home. In reality, Kobe had little to do with the show before he moved to Italy (although he was aware of the show's existence), and was asked to be on Iron Chef near the end of the four years.

Originally believing that he would be a challenger, Kobe found out that he was to be an Iron Chef mere days before his departure from Italy. Because of his quick turnaround from culinary apprentice to Iron Chef, Kobe is often considered to be a "junior Iron Chef", having little experience compared to the other Iron Chefs.

Kobe, unlike his three fellow chefs, typically rises alone in Kitchen Stadium, many times accompanied by a group of violins playing 'Stoning' by Sahashi Toshihiko. It was also to be noted that challenging chefs who were to face Kobe always had the fact explicitly mentioned during the challenger's bio, something that was rarely done with the other three Iron Chefs.

Kobe, known as the "Prince of Pasta", is the only Iron Chef to have lost his opening battle–with pasta as its theme. Out of concern for his apparent time mismanagement during the battle, subsequent battles he ran to the theme ingredient stand in the opening seconds (compared to his opponents who simply walked) in order for him to gain precious seconds that could be used for cooking. His tenure as an Iron Chef saw him battling in 24 battles, with a 16–7–1 record. He is also the only Iron Chef to lose a dessert battle, though he is one of three Iron Chefs to have never lost consecutive battles, nor did he lose against an Italian chef after his opening loss, going 7–0.

After Iron Chef, Kobe opened his own restaurant, the Ristorante Massa, in the Ebisu district of Tokyo, in 2000. In the post-series New York Battle special in 2000, he assisted Iron Chef French Hiroyuki Sakai in delivering a lecture on preparing salmon to students at the Culinary Institute of America. One of his signature dishes was trofies stuffed with chocolate.

He died on March 14, 2019, aged 49, from injuries sustained in a fall at one of his restaurants.
