= Hattori Nutrition College =

University in Tokyo

Coordinates: 35°41′5.4″N 139°42′11.9″E

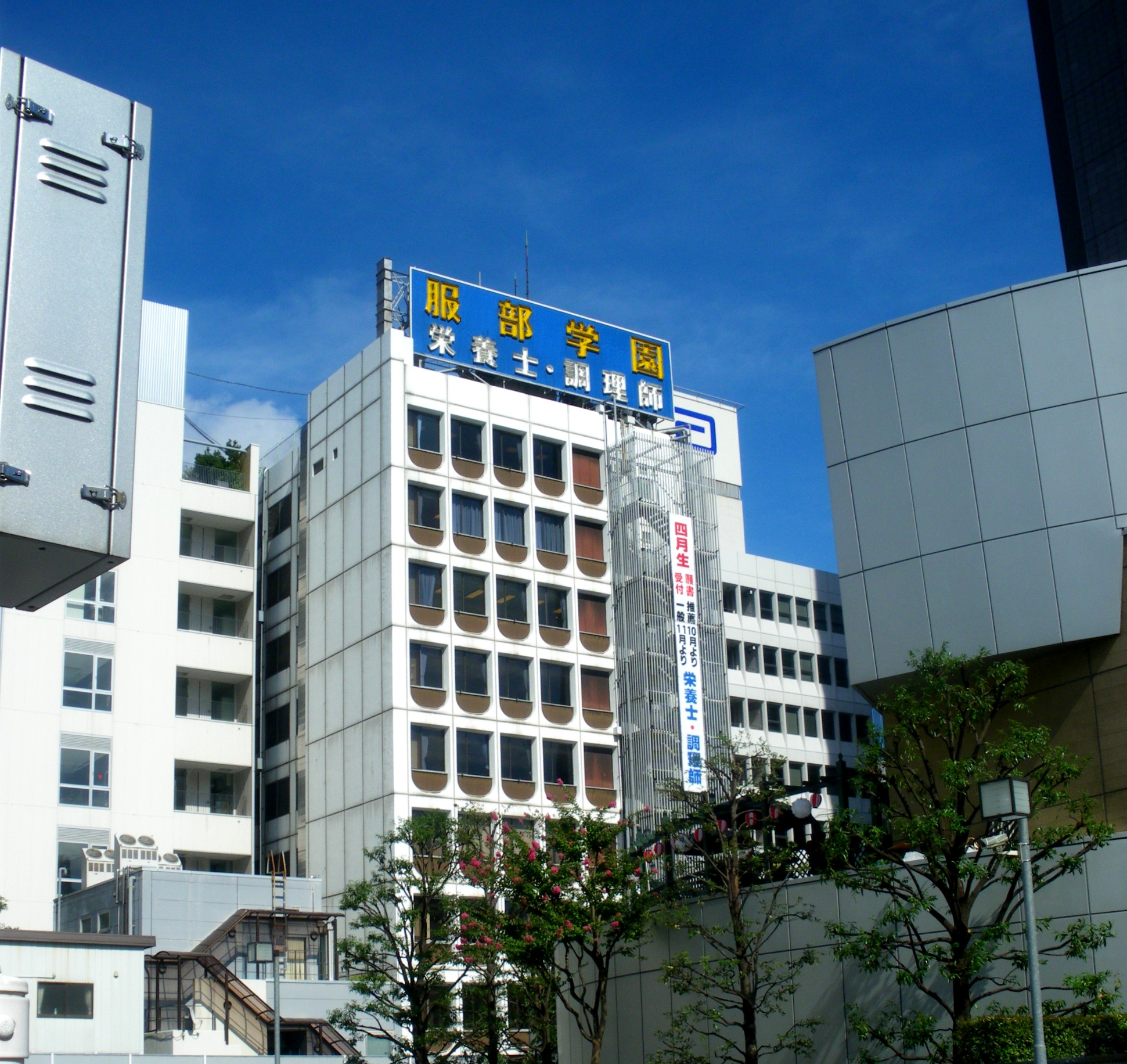
Hattori Nutrition College

Hattori Nutrition College (服部栄養専門学校, Hattori Eiyō Senmon Gakkō), formerly Hattori Gakuen, is a cooking school in Yoyogi, Shibuya, Tokyo, Japan.

Hattori Nutrition College offers certification courses and degree programs in culinary arts and dietetics.

The founder was Dr. Yukio Hattori, known for his role in the popular Japanese game show Iron Chef.

In the Japanese Iron Chef, Hattori Nutrition College students assisted the competing chefs in cooking duties. Dr. Hattori was the show's culinary commentator.

== Access ==
The campus is about a three-minute walk from JR Yoyogi Station and about a five-minute walk from Shinjuku Station.
