= Stéphane Froidevaux =

French chef

- Born: France
- Spouse: Lea
- Culinary career
- Cooking style: French
- Rating(s): Michelin stars; AAA Motor Club; Mobil; Good Food Guide
- Current restaurant(s): Le Fantin Latour
- Previous restaurant(s): L'antidote
- Television show(s): Krav Sakinim

Chef Stéphane Froidevaux is a Michelin star awarded French chef. Froidevaux opened his first restaurant called L'antidote in Alliey hotel in Provance. After he won the Michelin star, he closed L'antidote and opened his new restaurant called Le Fantin Latour in Grenoble. Froidevaux attended the Israeli version of iron chef called Krav Sakinim (Knives Battle) and won in the first and second seasons. After the show he began to appear on television shows and commercials on Israeli television. The 18 th January 2021, his restaurant the Fantin Latour obtains one Michelin Star
