= Rokusaburo Michiba =

Japanese chef (born 1931)

- Born: 3 January 1931 (age 95); Kaga, Ishikawa Prefecture, Japan
- Known for: Iron Chef
- Culinary career
- Cooking style: Japanese cuisine
- Current restaurants
- Ginza Rokusan-tei, and Kaishoku-Michiba in Ginza
- Television show
- Iron Chef
- Website: Official website

Rokusaburō Michiba (Japanese: 道場 六三郎, Hepburn: Michiba Rokusaburō; born 3 January 1931) is a Japanese chef, best known as the inaugural Japanese Iron Chef on the television series Iron Chef. He was born in Yamanaka, Ishikawa. His tenure on the program lasted from its debut in 1993 until his retirement on his 65th birthday, January 3, 1996.

== Career as Iron Chef ==
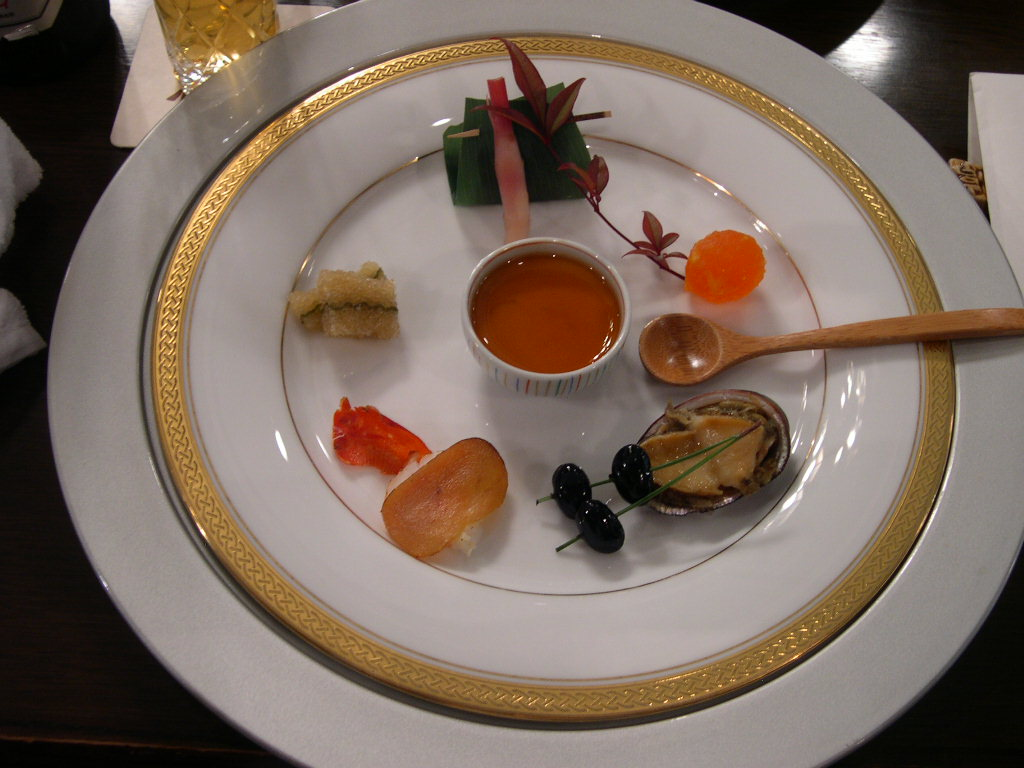
First course of a tasting menu offered at Ginza Rokusan-tei

Michiba's hallmark preparation was Inochi no Dashi (Broth of Vigor), a blend of katsuobushi (skipjack tuna shavings) and kombu (kelp), in Iron Chef battles. In his debut battle, he faced French cuisine-trained Yousei Kobayakawa, in which foie gras was the theme ingredient.

A practiced calligrapher, Michiba typically wrote his menu in stylized script at the beginning of battles. In specific, rare instances, when he delayed or omitted this, it sometimes cost him a victory. In an episode in 1996 where his sous-chef challenged Iron Chef Masaharu Morimoto, he later explained that the practice helped him communicate his presentation and guided his assistants in the execution of dishes.

Michiba's tenure was interrupted in mid-1995 due to an illness that required hospitalization. Following his recovery, he began experiencing fatigue from the combined stress of appearing on the show and managing his three restaurants: Poisson Rokusaburo in Akasaka, Ginza Rokusan-tei, and Kaishoku-Michiba, the latter two located in the Ginza district.

According to Takeshi Kaga, upon his retirement, Michiba vowed to recruit his successor. The show continued with French Iron Chef Hiroyuki Sakai and Chinese Iron Chef Chen Kenichi for two months. Koumei Nakamura was appointed as Michiba's successor; he initially refused but later accepted. Nakamura's first battle was on March 1, 1996, against French chef Kiyoshi Suzuki. During the introduction of the theme ingredient, Takeshi Kaga (Chairman Kaga) stated that he wanted to choose foie gras to partially recreate Michiba's first victory by using the same ingredient.

Michiba made subsequent appearances in Iron Chef-related events, including the 2012 revival ("Ryōri no Tetsujin Dream Match! World Iron Chef Live Battle Special"), as well as interviews with former assistant Kenichi Miyanaga, a seat on the tasting panel, and as a competitor against new Iron Chef Jun Kurogi. In 2017, Michiba participated in an Iron Chefs All-Star Dinner event at Australia’s Sydney Opera House.

== Career outside Iron Chef ==
Michiba has operated several restaurants across Japan, including Kaishoku-Michiba in the Ginza district of Tokyo. As of 2022, Michiba continued to operate restaurants, including Kaishoku-Michiba in Tokyo’s Ginza district, and continuing to open restaurants as of September, 2026.

The manga series Kandō Ō Retsuden featured a story about Michiba in volume 2, titled "Michiba Rokusaburō Monogatari". It was compiled by Yasuo Negishi and illustrated by Yoshihiro Takahashi.
