= Chen Kenichi =

Japanese chef (1956–2023)

- 陳建一
- Chen during his tenure with Iron Chef.
- Born: Ken'ichi Azuma; 5 January 1956; Tokyo, Japan
- Died: 11 March 2023 (aged 67); Tokyo, Japan
- Education: Tamagawa University
- Children: Chen Kentarō (son)
- Parent: Chen Kenmin (father)
- Culinary career
- Cooking style: General Chinese, Sichuan
- Current restaurant(s): Shisen Hanten group of restaurants found in Akasaka, Ikebukuro, Roppongi, Tokushima, Kure (Hiroshima Prefecture), Matsuyama and Hakata
- Television show: Iron Chef

Japanese name
- Kanji: 陳建一
- Hiragana: ちん けんいち
- Katakana: チン ケンイチ
Transcriptions
- Romanization: Chin Ken'ichi

Ken'ichi Azuma (Japanese: 東 建一, Hepburn: Azuma Ken'ichi; 5 January 1956 – 11 March 2023), known professionally as Chen Kenichi (Japanese: 陳建一, Hepburn: Chin Ken'ichi) (Note: Also romanized Chin Kenichi.) was a Chinese - Japanese chef and restaurateur, best known for his role as the Iron Chef Chinese on the television series Iron Chef (料理の鉄人).

Nicknamed The Szechuan Sage, he wore a yellow outfit and rose into Kitchen Stadium holding a large Chinese chef's knife in his hand. He was the only Iron Chef to have held his position throughout the life of the show. He was born in Japan to a Japanese mother named Yoko (洋子) and a Han Chinese father, Chen Kenmin.

== Background ==
Chen was born in Tokyo in 1956. His father was Chen Kenmin, a Chinese-born chef and restaurateur, who is regarded as the father of Sichuan cuisine (四川料理) in Japan. Chen's signature dish, "prawns in chili Sauce" (Ebi Chili) (干烧明虾), was an adaptation of a dish that his father had introduced to Japan. As a result, Chen was often compared to his father on the series, with some saying that Iron Chef helped the son exceed the skills of his father.

Chen attended the Tokyo Chinese School and Tamagawa Gakuen High School, and graduated from Tamagawa University with a degree in English and American Literature.

== Iron Chef ==
Chen originally accepted his position on Iron Chef out of the need for a challenge, although the format of the show intrigued him. Even though he was the longest-serving Iron Chef and the only original Iron Chef, having been an Iron Chef for the series' six-year run, Chen had on several occasions considered leaving his position; among his reasons was the desire to tend to his restaurants, which had become booked every night since the show's start, as well as a bout of depression following the death of his mother. Ultimately, it was fellow Iron Chef Hiroyuki Sakai who convinced Chen to stay, with their agreement that should one leave the show, so would the other.

Because of his long tenure, Chen fought more battles than any of the other Iron Chefs, at 92 battles. He won 67, lost 22, and tied 3. He also enjoyed a run of 14 consecutive victories, the longest of any Iron Chef. His most memorable dish was chili prawns.

Despite his excellent record on the show, Chen often appeared endearingly surprised and relieved at victory.

=== Memorable matches ===
Among Chen's more memorable matches was one with challenger Dominique Corby of the Tour d'Argent, where, after the main battle (with foie gras as the theme ingredient) was fought to a tie, the overtime battle (with asparagus as the theme) also resulted in a tie—the only time that such an outcome occurred in the series. Rather than have Chen and Corby fight a second overtime battle, Chairman Kaga, the show's host decreed that both contestants were the winners, effectively calling the battle a draw.

As with other Iron Chefs, Chen "feuded" with a warring faction that acknowledged the worthiness of his culinary caliber who were determined to take him down. In his case, he battled with the chefs of Heichinrou restaurant in Yokohama, defeating two of their members before finally losing to their head chef in an overtime battle.

- Takashi Saito (not to be confused with the baseball player), top apprentice of Chen Kenmin and coach of Chen Kenichi. Chen beat his tutor in a prawn battle. Saito re-created Kenmin's original prawns in chili sauce, while Kenichi created his father's modern version of the dish (canapé style with ketchup).
- Junichi Itoh had one of the most interesting cooking styles in the world. He began practicing French cooking at age 18 and left for France at the age of 28 to further his culinary skills. However, Itoh left for Italy three years later and joined Enoteca Pincchiori, the same place where Iron Chef Italian Masahiko Kobe was trained. At age 32, Itoh began training at a top Japanese restaurant to learn Japanese culinary traditions further extending his arsenal of culinary expertise. By the time that Itoh was 35, he opened his restaurant L'Herlequin Bis in Tokyo. His French-Italian-Japanese fusion cooking style caught the attention of Takeshi Kaga which led him to invite Itoh to be asked to appear on the Iron Chef television show as a challenger. Itoh accepted the offer and went to Kitchen Stadium with Japanese culinary critic and journalist Asako Kishi, who was known for her role as a guest judge on the show as frequent member on the Iron Chef tasting panel. To everyone's surprise, he chose Chen Kenichi as the opponent, saying that he was interested in Chinese cuisine, but had never been trained at it. Kaga chose a difficult theme ingredient, plain yoghurt. Itoh was smiling while Chen was under great pressure. However, according to Kishi's comments at the end, all of Itoh's dishes used the yoghurt as a supporting ingredient instead of the main focus of the dish. This resulted in all four judges voting for Chen. This was quite a surprise to Chen, who pointed to himself in disbelief.
- Katsuyo Kobayashi was the show's second female challenger and a popular TV chef in her own right, hosting Kyo no ryori (Today's cooking) on NHK. She allowed Chairman Kaga to choose the Iron Chef for her and he gleefully chose Chen, who had previously lost to Kitchen Stadium's first female challenger, Kyoko Kagata. At one point during the battle, in which potatoes were the theme ingredient, Kobayashi paid a brief visit to Chen's station to observe his cooking, which he wasn't very pleased about. Chen ultimately lost to Kobayashi, with the judges commenting that his potatoes tended to be undercooked or underplayed.

== Outside Iron Chef ==
Chen was an avid baseball fan and stated that it would have been his choice to go professional but opted not to.

Outside of Iron Chef, Chen was also an active restaurateur. He operated the Shisen Hanten (四川飯店, lit. "Sichuan restaurant") group of restaurants located in Akasaka, Ikebukuro and Roppongi in Tokyo, as well as Tokushima city in Tokushima Prefecture; Kure, Hiroshima; Matsuyama, Ehime; and Hakata-ku, Fukuoka. The restaurant was inherited from his father and he was the third to run it after his mother took over.

Shisen Hanten's branch in Singapore, run by his son Chen Kentaro (陳建太郎, Chin Kentaro), has earned two Michelin stars since 2016. It is located in the newly renovated 1000+ room Hilton Singapore hotel, the largest hotel in the Asia Pacific.

== Death ==
According to Minken Kigyo, the company Chen established and was the former CEO, Chen died of interstitial pneumonia on 11 March 2023, at age 67.

== See also ==
- Chinese people in Japan
