= Kenji Fukui =

Japanese television announcer (born 1953)

Kenji Fukui (福井 謙二, Fukui Kenji; born September 8, 1953, in Hiroshima) is a Japanese television announcer. He began his broadcasting career in 1976 with Fuji Television, and was one of the three longest-serving television presenters on the Fuji network, before he quit the station in 2013.

Fukui has hosted numerous television news and variety programs, but is best known as the "play by play" announcer of Iron Chef. He is known for his frequent jokes towards actors and guests on the show, and has a comical attitude on the show. He is the almost constant narrator on the show and talks about the food being used, the chefs, and explains the finished dishes to the home audience before they are judged. He is also known for making frequent analogies to baseball while commentating.

Fukui is the host of the television variety show Tamori's Japonica Logos, starring Japanese TV personality Tamori.
