= Takeshi Kaga =

Japanese actor (born 1950)

- Born: Shigekatsu Katsuta; October 12, 1950 (age 76); Kanazawa, Ishikawa, Japan
- Occupation: Actor
- Years active: 1972–present
- Children: 1 son
- Website: Official site

Shigekatsu Katsuta (勝田 薫且, Katsuta Shigekatsu; born October 12, 1950), known professionally as Takeshi Kaga (鹿賀 丈史, Kaga Takeshi), is a Japanese actor who is best known internationally for his portrayal of Chairman Kaga in the Japanese television show Iron Chef produced by Fuji TV.

== Biography ==
Kaga was born on October 12, 1950, in the city of Kanazawa in Ishikawa Prefecture, Japan. His first experience on stage was at the age of seven when he joined the Kanazawa City Boys choral group.

In 1972, he joined the Japanese theatrical company Gekidan Shiki. While with the company, he played the role of Jesus in the Japanese stage production of Jesus Christ Superstar (1973), and role of Tony in West Side Story (1974). In 1980 he left Shiki to play the role of Sanada in the movie The Beast To Die. He starred in several movies throughout the 1980s, but his most famous role would be that of "Chairman Kaga", the eccentric and flamboyant host of Ryōri no Tetsujin, a cooking competition show (1993–1999). It became very popular, not only in Japan, but around the English-speaking world. Previously broadcast on the Food Network, then on the Fine Living Network in the United States and on SBS in Australia, under the name Iron Chef, the show is now being carried on the Cooking Channel in the United States, and in the UK in Iron Chef UK. The host of Iron Chef America, Mark Dacascos, is claimed on ICA to be Takeshi's nephew, though the stated relationship is actually between the fictional characters played by the two men.

Despite his international fame with the show, he has not given up his love for musicals. In 1987 he starred in the popular Japanese production of Les Misérables as Jean Valjean and Javert. He reprised his role as Valjean in 1995 as the representative of Japan during the encore of the 10th Anniversary Concert of Les Misérables at the Royal Albert Hall in London. During the encore, Valjeans from 17 countries joined the cast on stage. He also starred in Macbeth in 2000, and in Jekyll & Hyde as well as in The Threepenny Opera in 2001. In 2009, he starred in a Japanese-language version of La Cage aux Folles .

He has also lent his voice to Japanese anime. Notably, he voiced Jirarudan, an antagonist, in 1999's Pokémon the Movie: Revelation Lugia, the second Pokémon movie, and also sung his theme song, "Ware Wa Collector." He also notably voiced Dr. Kiriko in 2005's Black Jack: The Two Doctors of Darkness.

After Iron Chef ended, he returned to acting in movies and dramas. He also hosted Time Shock 21, a quiz show on Asahi Television in Japan. In 2005, Kaga performed as the lead in the Japanese production of Michael Frayn's Democracy and starred in the blockbuster film Sengoku Jieitai 1549. Kaga also appeared in both installments of the highly successful Death Note film series as Soichiro Yagami.

== Filmography ==
=== Television ===
Year	Title	Role	Notes	Ref.
1978	Ōgon no Hibi	Dom Justo Takayama	Taiga drama	
1983	Tokugawa Ieyasu	Ishida Mitsunari	Taiga drama	
1990	Tobu ga Gotoku	Ōkubo Toshimichi	Lead role; Taiga drama	
1993	Furikaereba Yatsu ga Iru	Junichi Nakagawa		
1993 - 2001	Iron Chef	Chairman Kaga	Cooking show	
1994	Furuhata Ninzaburo	Junichi Nakagawa	Episode 8	
2010	Kaibutsu-kun	King Monster		
2016	Pretty Proofreader	Daisaku Hongō	Special appearance	
2017	Moribito: Guardian of the Spirit	Hibitonan	Season 3; substitute for Mikijirō Hira	
2018	Segodon	Shimazu Narioki	Taiga drama	

=== Films ===
Year	Title	Role	Notes	Ref.
1980	The Beast To Die	Tetsuo Sanada		
1988	Kimurake no Hitobito	Hazime Kimura	Lead role	
2005	Black Jack: Two Doctors in Black	Dr. Kiriko (voice)		
2006	Death Note	Soichiro Yagami		
2006	Death Note: The Last Name	Soichiro Yagami		
2019	Listen to the Universe	Masayuki Onodera		
2019	Whistleblower	Motonari Nashida		
2020	Mio's Cookbook	Uneno Sōma		
2025	Gosh!!			

=== Japanese dub ===
Year	Title	Role	Notes	Ref.
2023	Wish	Sabino		

== Awards and nominations ==
Year	Award	Category	Result	Ref.
1982	6th Elan d'or Awards	Newcomer of the Year	Won	
