= Hiroyuki Sakai =

Japanese chef (born 1942)

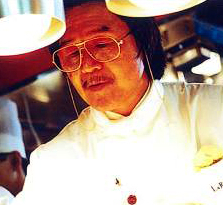
- Hiroyuki Sakai
- Born: April 2, 1942 (age 84); Izumi, Kagoshima, Japan
- Education: Apprenticeship
- Culinary career
- Cooking style: French
- Current restaurant(s): La Rochelle (Minami Aoyama) La Rochelle (Fukuoka) La Rochelle (Sanno)
- Television show: Iron Chef

Hiroyuki Sakai (坂井 宏行, Sakai Hiroyuki; born April 2, 1942) is a French-Japanese chef who specializes in French cuisine. Sakai is best known as the second, final, and longest-serving Iron Chef French on the Japanese television show Iron Chef, first appearing at the beginning of 1994 (after Yutaka Ishinabe retired) and continuing to appear over the show's nine further seasons. Sakai has the third best winning percentage of the Iron Chefs, trailing only his Iron Chef French predecessor, Yutaka Ishinabe and the first Iron Chef Japanese Rokusaburo Michiba. He was named the "King of Iron Chefs" after emerging victorious from the show's grand finale, a tournament involving all the active Iron Chefs. He went on to defeat the top chef in the world, Alain Passard, in the final Long-Gang Chicken battle. His record on Iron Chef is 70–15–1.

His television trademark is a red French chef's costume; he rises into Kitchen Stadium holding a yonashi ("Western Pear") in his hand. He is often described as the "Delacroix of French cuisine" because of the presentation of his dishes. His formidable record in fish challenges led to fans of the show giving him the nickname, "Seafood Sakai".

== Career ==
Sakai was originally asked to be on Iron Chef by the producer Toshihiko Matsuo following the recommendation from hotel restaurateur Kihachi Kumagai. Sakai agreed after being convinced by his staff, believing the impression that the show would air for another six months, giving him two or three appearances. The six-month tenure, as it turned out, turned into six years. The early era of Iron Chef saw Sakai being the "middle Iron Chef" along with Rokusaburo Michiba, a chef twelve years his senior, and Chen Kenichi, the youngest and least experienced of the three Iron Chefs at the time. It is often viewed by fans as the period when Iron Chef had the strongest Iron Chefs.

Reactions to Sakai's appointment to Iron Chef were largely negative amongst chefs circles, largely because of the low stature of Iron Chef among chefs at the time which led many to believe would ruin their reputations as chefs, but others also believing that there was no possibility that any French dish would take less than one hour to prepare. However, as the show became more popular, chefs, judges, and fans became more supportive. It was said that Sakai's son's employer had his employees frequent the restaurant as a show of support.

Like many chefs, Sakai did not take to losing very well. Upon his first loss, he had tried to be cheerful in explaining his loss to a younger chef who also owned his own restaurant, but his entire staff was mortified upon hearing the news. His daughter was teased in school whenever Sakai had lost - although this was a fairly rare occurrence. In an effort to learn from others, Sakai often tasted food opponents had prepared, or grabbed assistants and asked them questions after the battle was over.

Outside of Iron Chef, Sakai is the owner and head chef of the restaurant La Rochelle, in Aoyama. The restaurant was named after La Rochelle, a city in France where Sakai had spent some time as an apprentice. Sakai is a member of the Club des Trente, an organization of French chefs in Japan. Sakai was mentored by the Japan's pioneer of French Cooking, Fujio Shido for three years.

After the series' run, Sakai appeared in several Iron Chef specials. In the "New York Special", he gave a presentation to the Culinary Institute of America on the preparation of salmon, assisted by Iron Chef Italian Masahiko Kobe. He also appeared on Iron Chef America : Battle of the Masters, where he lost a trout battle to Bobby Flay (during which he created a trout-flavored ice cream) and teamed up with Mario Batali in a seafood battle.

In 2009, Sakai was named a recipient of the Gendai no Meiko (Contemporary Master Craftsmen) awards, honoring Japan's foremost artisans in various fields.

In 2010, Sakai was a guest judge for the MasterChef Australia season 2 finals week.

In 2013, Sakai was a Guest of Iron Chef for the Iron Chef Thailand.

== Memorable battles ==
- Guy Shokr – Sakai's debut battle which he defeated Shokr with oysters as the theme
- Club Mistral – This club headed by Masahiro Miyamoto, challenged Sakai on several occasions. However, only one challenger, Kazutaka Okabe, defeated Sakai (in Battle Lamb) on June 9, 1995. All of the other challengers, including Isao Yanagidate (caviar), Tatsu Shimada (truffle), and Seiji Toyoshima (milk) lost to Sakai over the span of 3 years. The Iron Chef's record against Mistral is 3-1 (not including Iron Chef Ishinabe's win).
- Toshiro Kandagawa – Battled Sakai twice, once in 1995 for the 100th Challengers special using Lotus Root (losing to Sakai), and once in 2001 for the 21st Century Special using Red Snapper (defeating Sakai).
- Rory Kennedy – Iron Chef Sakai had his only overtime battle against this man on January 24, 1997. Kennedy, a gibier chef, was handed the theme European Rabbit. Sakai managed to force overtime, tied at 71 points each. In the overtime session, Sakai used European Pigeon to defeat Kennedy.
- Iron Chef Chinese Chen Kenichi – Sakai battled Chen two times, once for the 1995 Mr. Iron Chef Semifinal using Chicken (losing to Chen on a 3–2 decision), and for the King of Iron Chefs Tournament Final in 1999 using Homard Lobster (defeated Chen by a 3–2 decision, with a deciding vote by former Iron Chef Michiba).
- Alain Passard – After Passard tied Iron Chef Komei Nakamura in the Foie Gras battle in the 1997 World Cup, Sakai faced him after winning the King of Iron Chefs Tournament in 1999. Using Long-Gang Chicken, he made four dishes that impressed the judges and won him a 3-2 judges decision to be the #1 chef in the world.
