= 2021 in Japan =

- Decades: 2000s; 2010s; 2020s; 2030s
- See also: Other events of 2021; History of Japan • Timeline • Years

Events in the year 2021 in Japan.

The second year was largely defined by COVID-19 pandemic that caused the national economy to go into recession, and would continue until October 1, 2021 (when the fourth state of emergency ends).

Politically, Liberal Democratic Party leader Fumio Kishida was officially elected as 100th Prime Minister of Japan on October 4, 2021 after winning a majority of votes in both houses of parliament. The new cabinet members under Kishida, who succeeds Yoshihide Suga than one year of Shinzo Abe, are likely due to be announced later in the day.

== Incumbents ==
- Emperor: Naruhito
- Prime Minister
  - Yoshihide Suga (Liberal Democratic) (until October 4)
  - Fumio Kishida (Liberal Democratic) (starting October 4)
- Chief Cabinet Secretary
  - Katsunobu Katō (Liberal Democratic) (until October 4)
  - Hirokazu Matsuno (Liberal Democratic) (starting October 4)
- Chief Justice of Japan: Naoto Ōtani
- Speaker of the House of Representatives
  - Tadamori Ōshima (Liberal Democratic) (until October 14)
  - Hiroyuki Hosoda (Liberal Democratic) (starting November 10)
- President of the House of Councillors: Akiko Santō (Liberal Democratic)

=== Governors ===
- Aichi Prefecture: Hideaki Omura
- Akita Prefecture: Norihisa Satake
- Aomori Prefecture: Shingo Mimura
- Chiba Prefecture: Toshihito Kumagai
- Ehime Prefecture: Tokihiro Nakamura
- Fukui Prefecture: Tatsuji Sugimoto
- Fukuoka Prefecture: Seitaro Hattori
- Fukushima Prefecture: Masao Uchibori
- Gifu Prefecture: Hajime Furuta
- Gunma Prefecture: Ichita Yamamoto
- Hiroshima Prefecture: Hidehiko Yuzaki
- Hokkaido: Naomichi Suzuki
- Hyogo Prefecture: Motohiko Saitō
- Ibaraki Prefecture: Kazuhiko Ōigawa
- Ishikawa: Masanori Tanimoto
- Iwate Prefecture: Takuya Tasso
- Kagawa Prefecture: Keizō Hamada
- Kagoshima Prefecture: Kōichi Shiota
- Kanagawa Prefecture: Yuji Kuroiwa
- Kumamoto Prefecture: Ikuo Kabashima
- Kochi Prefecture: Seiji Hamada
- Kyoto Prefecture: Takatoshi Nishiwaki
- Mie Prefecture: Eikei Suzuki
- Miyagi Prefecture: Yoshihiro Murai
- Miyazaki Prefecture: Shunji Kōno
- Nagano Prefecture: Shuichi Abe
- Nagasaki Prefecture: Hōdō Nakamura
- Nara Prefecture: Shōgo Arai
- Niigata Prefecture: Hideyo Hanazumi
- Oita Prefecture: Katsusada Hirose
- Okayama Prefecture: Ryuta Ibaragi
- Okinawa Prefecture: Denny Tamaki
- Osaka Prefecture: Ichirō Matsui
- Saga Prefecture: Yoshinori Yamaguchi
- Saitama Prefecture: Motohiro Ōno
- Shiga Prefecture: Taizō Mikazuki
- Shiname Prefecture: Tatsuya Maruyama
- Shizuoka Prefecture: Heita Kawakatsu
- Tochigi Prefecture: Tomikazu Fukuda
- Tokushima Prefecture: Kamon Iizumi
- Tokyo Prefecture: Yuriko Koike
- Tottori Prefecture: Shinji Hirai
- Toyama Prefecture: Hachiro Nitta
- Wakayama Prefecture: Yoshinobu Nisaka
- Yamagata Prefecture: Mieko Yoshimura
- Yamaguchi Prefecture: Tsugumasa Muraoka
- Yamanashi Prefecture: Kotaro Nagasaki

== Ongoing events ==
- COVID-19 pandemic (Until 1 October 2021)
- Japan–South Korea trade dispute

== Events by month ==
=== January ===
- January 1 – Emperor Naruhito and Prime Minister Yoshihide Suga delivered 2021 New Year's message to bring the COVID-19 under control and pledged to host the postponed 2020 Summer Olympics.
- January 2
  - The governors of Tokyo and three neighboring prefectures considered to declare another state of emergency over COVID-19 resurgence, Economic Revitalization Minister Yasutoshi Nishimura who in charge of COVID-19 response.
  - The world's oldest person, Kane Tanaka celebrated her 118th birthday in southwestern Japan on Saturday.
- January 4
  - The Nikkei 225 in Tokyo was off 0.4% at 27,344.87 after Prime Minister Yoshihide Suga announced the government is considering declaring a state of emergency for Tokyo and three surrounding prefectures due to surging virus caseloads.
  - The government considered declaring a nationwide state of emergency over COVID-19 resurgence, the countdown clock for the postponed Tokyo Olympics hit 200 days to go.
- January 5
  - Prime Minister Yoshihide Suga to declare another state of emergency in Tokyo and three neighboring prefectures as the COVID-19 resurgence on Thursday, while the government reported more than 4,900 cases.
  - New car sales in Japan slumped 11.5% in 2020 from a year earlier amid the pandemic, marking the largest fall in nine years, data from industry bodies showed Tuesday. While tuna gone cut price ¥20 million at Tokyo's Toyosu Market during New Year auction.
  - The Constitutional Democrats, Social Democrats, and the Communists prepared to form a pacifist coalition, despite to the anti-Suga Cabinet protests and riots. After the Japanese government warned about a new national lockdown in the European Union and the United Kingdom.

=== February ===
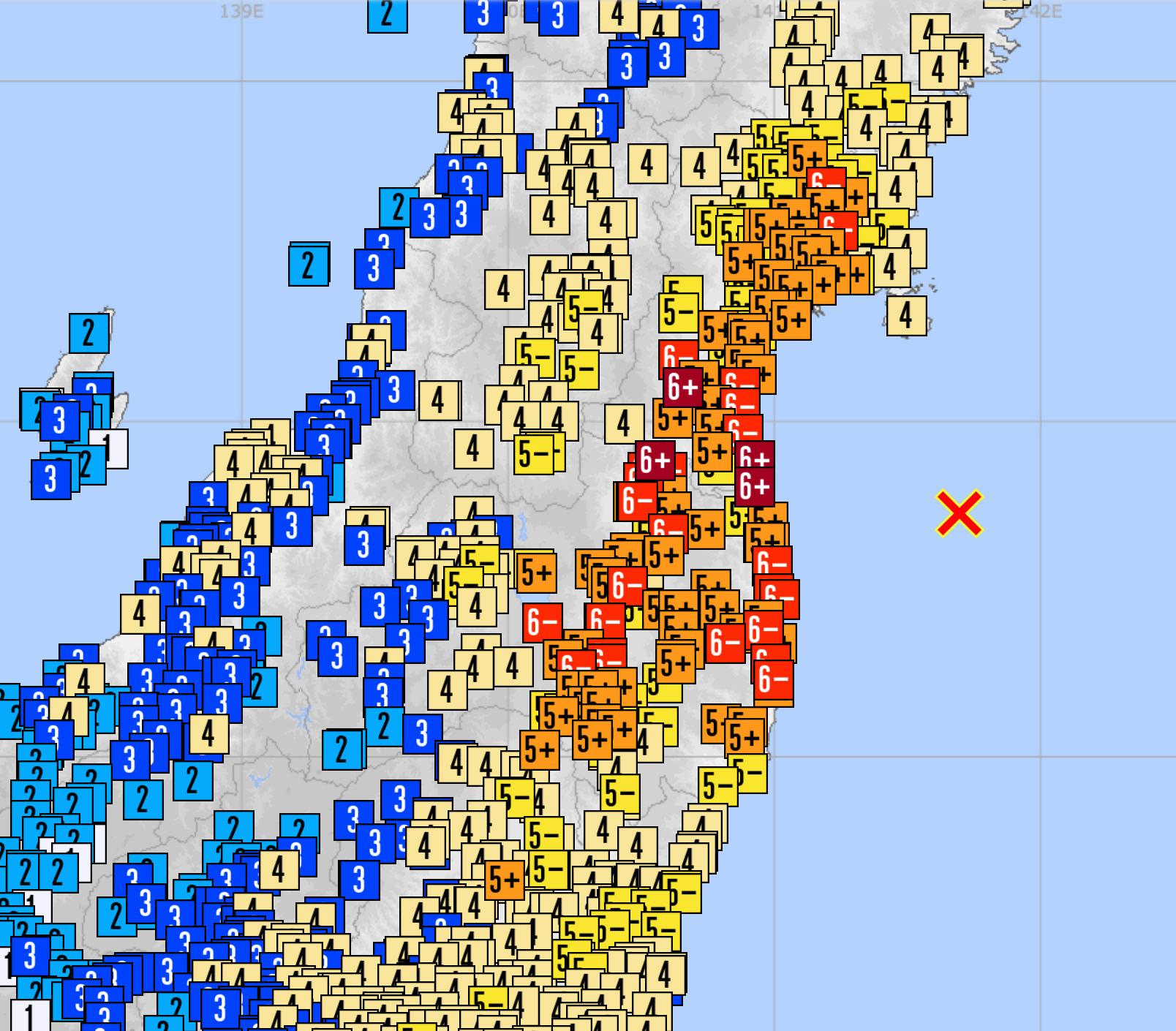
Fukushima earthquake

- February 13 – 2021 Fukushima earthquake

=== March ===
- March 11 – The 10th anniversary of the 2011 Tohoku earthquake and tsunami.
- March 20 – March 2021 Miyagi earthquake
- March 25 – The 2020 Summer Olympics torch relay restarted in Fukushima Prefecture.

=== April ===
- April 13 – The decision to dump radioactive water of the Fukushima nuclear plant into the Pacific Ocean over the course of 30 years finally obtains the approval of the Japanese cabinet.
- April 19 – Rockfish in Fukushima is banned from export after detecting caesium over legal limit, likely caused by the discharge of radioactive water of the Fukushima Nuclear Plant. This is the first ban since the lifting of ban on all Fukushima fish in February 2020.

=== May ===
- May 1 – A F2 scale tornado hit houses, building, utility polls and tea plantations in Makinohara, Shizuoka Prefecture. According to a local government official confirmed report, three persons were lightly injured and 102 houses and buildings were damaged.
- May 27 – According to a Japan Coast Guard official confirmed report, a chemical tanker Ulsan Pioneer and cargo ship Byakko (白虎) collided in Kurushima strait, Seto Island Sea, Ehime Prefecture. Nine persons were rescued, and there were three fatalities.

=== July ===
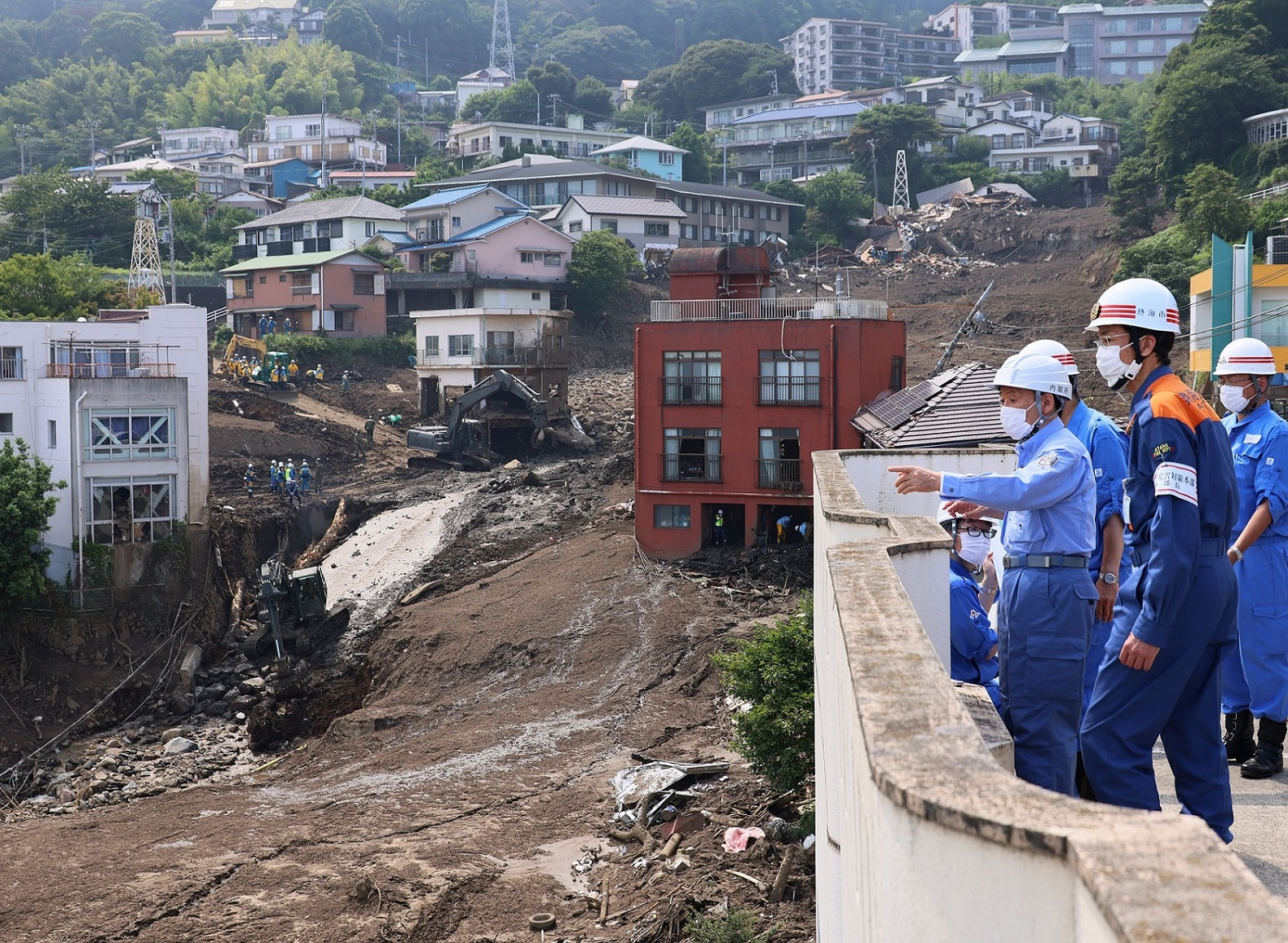
Atami landslide

- July 3 – 2021 Atami landslide
- July 23
  - 2020 Summer Olympics: The 2020 Summer Olympics opening ceremony takes place at the Japan National Stadium.
  - Nobel Prize-winning Japanese theoretical physicist Toshihide Maskawa died of oral cancer at aged 81.

=== August ===
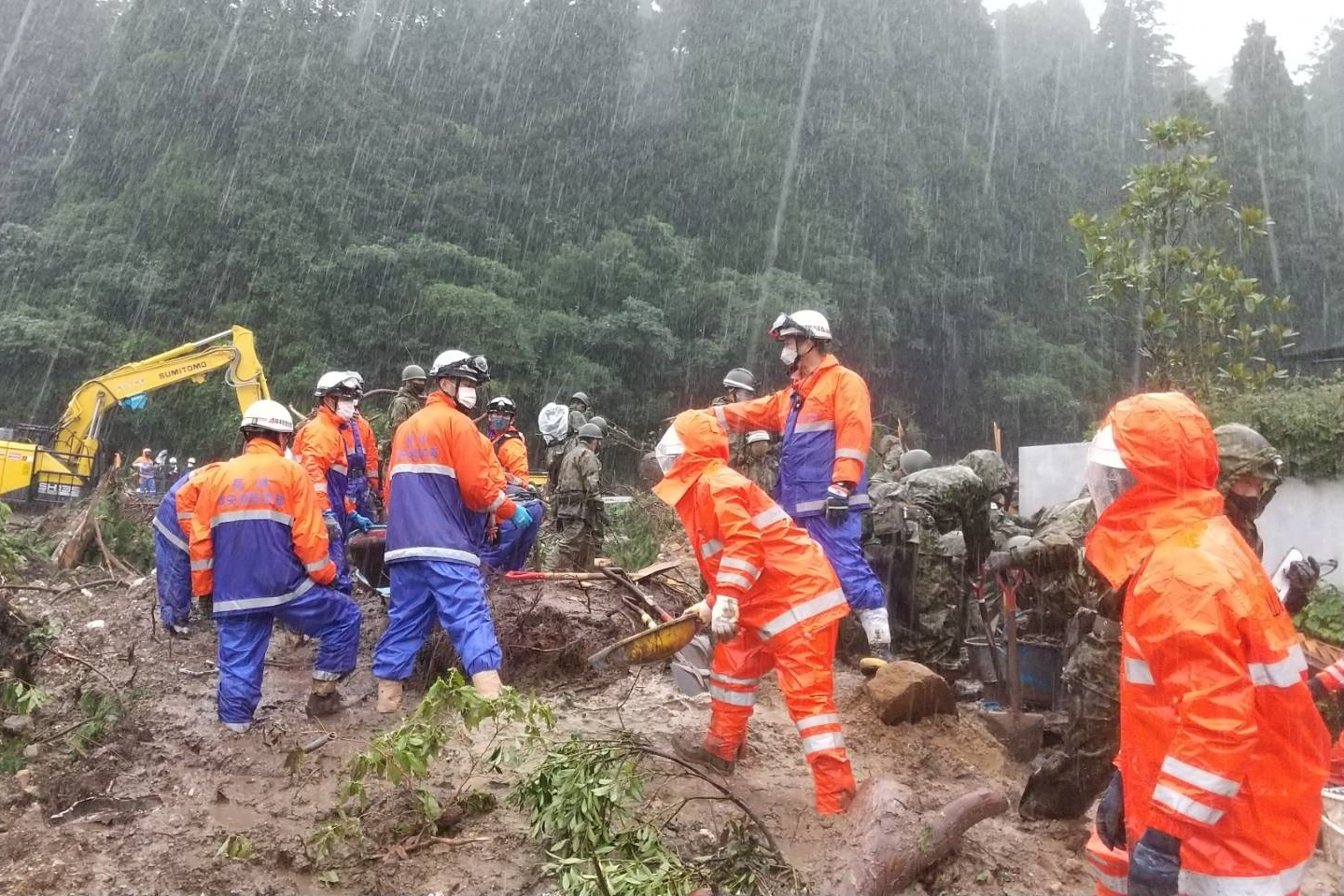
August heavy rains

- August 6 – According to a Japan National Police Agency report, a thirty-six years old suspect attacked passengers with a knife on a commuter train on Odakyu Line, Setagaya, Tokyo. He was detained by local police on the same day and 10 passengers were wounded. It is considered a terrorist attack.
- August 11 to 19 – 2021 August Japan flood, a torrential massive rain and flash flood hit Saga, Kyushu Island, and caused a landslide to hit around Kyushu, Honshu, resulting in 13 deaths and 17 injuries, according to a Japan Fire and Disaster Management Agency official confirmed report.
- August 12 – The 2020 Summer Paralympics torch relay started nationwide.
- August 13 – According to Japan Meteorological Agency official confirmed report, a largest volcano eruption hit in Fukutoku-Okanoba, Bonin Islands. According to Japan National Institute of Advanced Industrial and Science general manager Kazuhiro Ishimura said on 23 October, the volcano ash height estimate on 16,000 to 19,000 meters (52,493 to 62,335 foot) and 100 million cubic square meters ash volume, second largest volume ash eruption in territory of Japan's history.
- August 24
  - Senior member of the Yakuza, Satoru Nomura, is sentenced to death in Fukuoka, for ordering four assaults, one of which was deadly. Nomura has denied participating in the crimes. It is the first time that a senior member of Japan's Yakuza has been sentenced to death. (BBC)
  - The 2020 Summer Paralympics opening ceremony takes place at the Japan National Stadium.

=== September ===
- September 1 – The Digital Agency is launched to speed up digitalisation of governmental services.
- September 3 – Prime Minister Suga announced he will not stand in the 2021 Liberal Democratic Party (Japan) leadership election.
- September 26 – According to Japan Meteorological Agency official confirmed report, a height of 5,400 meters (17,700 foot) eruption records on Suwanosejima, Tokara Islands, Kagoshima Prefecture, where highest height of observation history.
- September 29 – Fumio Kishida, the foreign minister of outgoing Prime Minister Yoshihide Suga, is elected the Liberal Democratic Party's new president, paving the way for him to be Japan's next leader.
- September 30 – Despite COVID-19 Delta cases continued to fall, Japan lifted 4th and final state of emergency up as the country ahead of the endemic phase by one month and one day later.

=== October ===
- October 1 – Japan becoming the first country, who transition to the living with COVID-19 endemic phase in the future.
- October 3 – According to Wakayama mayor Masahiro Obana, a Musota Waterpipe Bridge suddenly severely deteriorated and damaged across Kino River, where 138,000 persons (60,000 households) suspend supply and not be possible to resume water supply function of the aqueduct and resident until December 2021.
- October 4 – Fumio Kishida becomes 100th Prime Minister of Japan, with a new Cabinet mostly made up of newcomers formed. General election for the House of Representatives will also be held on October 31.

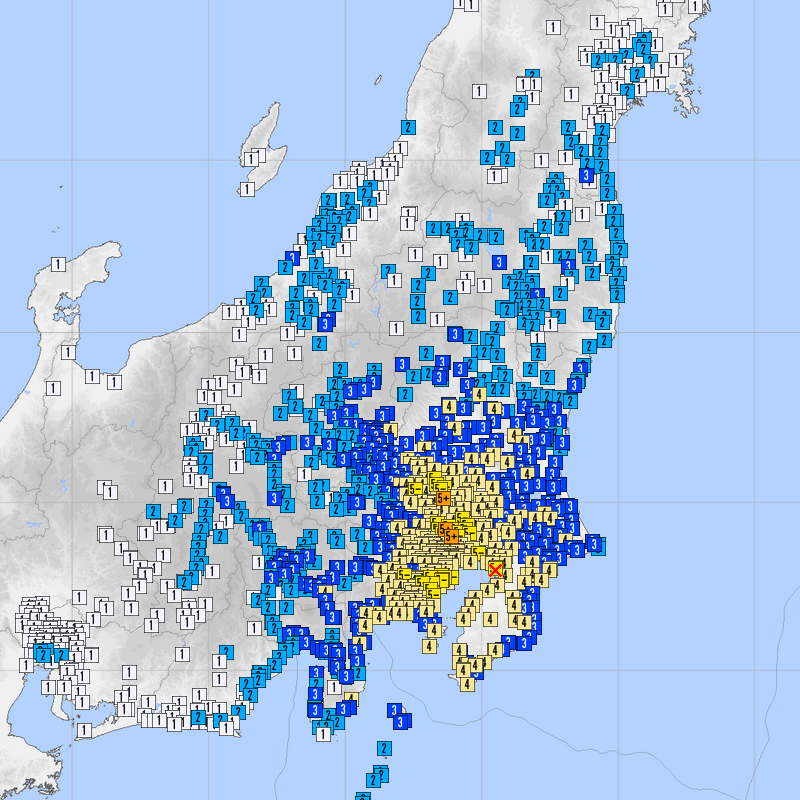
Chiba earthquake

- October 7 – 2021 Chiba earthquake. According to USGS report, a Richer Scale 5.9 earthquake hit around Tokyo Metropolitan Area, according to Japan Fire and Disaster Management Agency official confirmed report, 49 persons were wounded, due affective moderate quake.
- October 22 – Princess Mako of Akishino celebrates her last royal birthday, before turning bourgeois out of love.
- October 31
  - According to Japan National Police Agency official confirmed report, A twenty-four years old suspected to knife attack to passengers and arson, during run to Hachioji bound commuter train, Keio Line, Chofu, Tokyo, total 17 passengers injures.
  - 2021 Japanese general election was held.

=== November ===
- November 1 – A popular idol group, V6 disbands.
- November 10 – Kishida, president of the Liberal Democratic Party is appointed to the 101st prime minister by Emperor Naruhito and his second cabinet is formed, following a landslide victory for Liberal Democratic-Komeito coalition in the general election.
- November 30, 2021 to May 7, 2023 – Japan has confirmed the first case of COVID-19 Omicron variant, found from South Africa. As of May 7, 2023, Japan has reported 56,500 Omicron-related deaths, a lowest mortality toll, than compared to wealthy countries.

=== December ===
- December 1 – Aiko, Princess Toshi (only child of Emperor Naruhito and Empress Masako) comes of age at 20 and became adult. She receives Grand Cordon of the Order of the Precious Crown from her father.
- December 17 – 2021 Osaka building fire
- December 21 – Three death-row inmates were hanged, first executions taken place in 2 years.
- December 25 – A first dual-mode vehicle service, Awa-Kainan Station to Cape Muroto, via Kannoura Station, Asatō Line, Shikoku Island, for regular operation start in the world during the Christmas period, according to Awa Searide Railway official confirmed report.
- December 31 – According to official confirmed report, Japanese New Year has first returned after the first 20 months of COVID-19 pandemic in January 2020 and September 2021. However, a many Japanese people should wear a face masks and remain celebrated new year's eve after midnight.

== The Nobel Prize ==
- Syukuro Manabe: 2021 Nobel Prize in Physics winner.

== Arts and entertainment ==
- 2021 in anime
- 2021 in Japanese music
- 2021 in Japanese television
- List of 2021 box office number-one films in Japan
- List of Japanese films of 2021

== Sports ==
- 2020 Summer Olympics (Japan)
- 2020 Summer Paralympics (Japan)
- 2021 F4 Japanese Championship
- 2021 Super Formula Championship
- 2021 Super Formula Lights
- 2021 Super GT Series
- 2021 in Japanese football
- 2021 J1 League
- 2021 J2 League
- 2021 J3 League
- 2021 Japan Football League
- 2021 Japanese Regional Leagues
- 2021 Japanese Super Cup
- 2021 Emperor's Cup
- 2021 J.League Cup

== Deaths ==
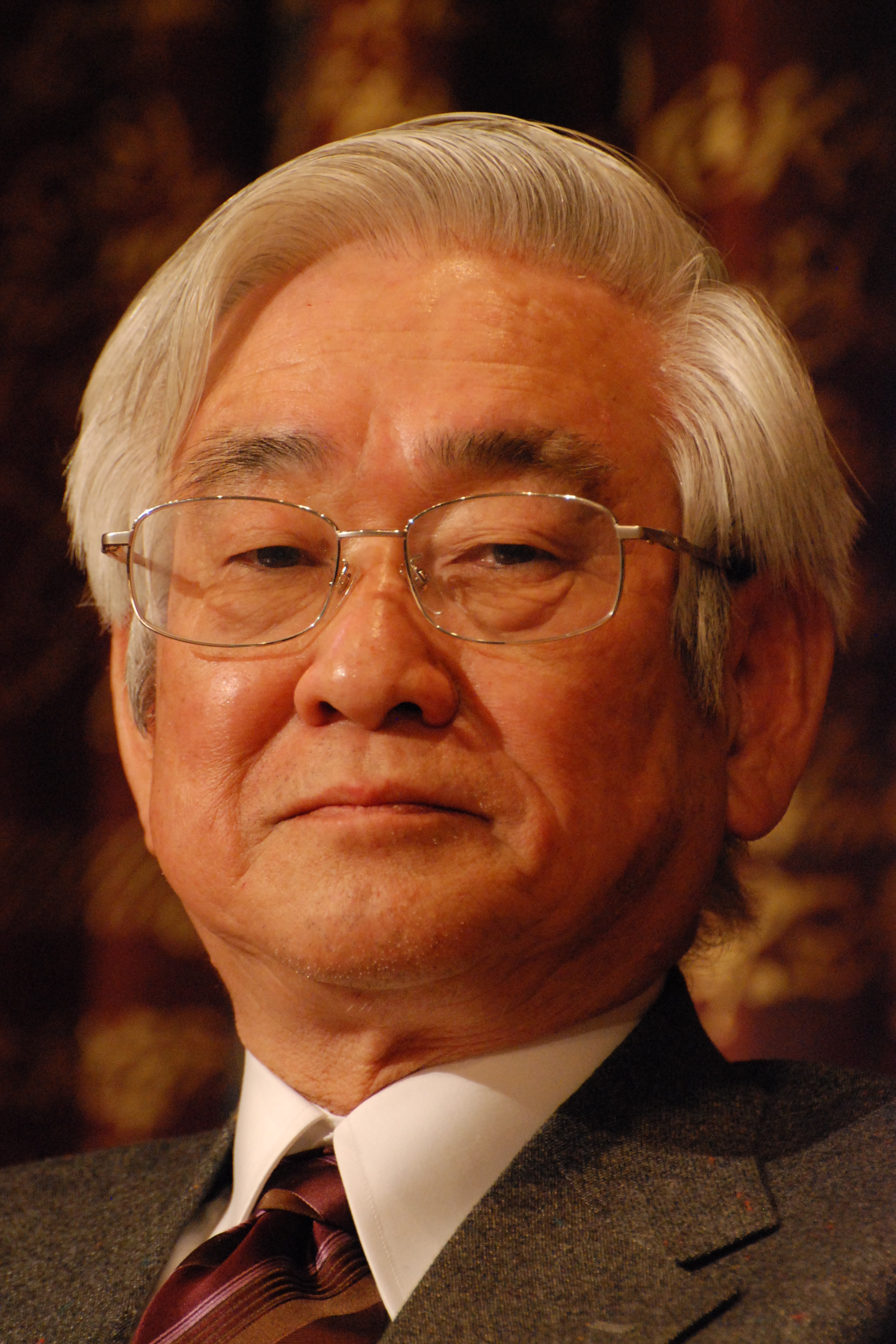
Toshihide Maskawa, Nobel Prize-winning Japanese theoretical physicist, has died of oral cancer on the same day as the opening ceremony of Tokyo Olympics. He was 81 years old.

In the third year of Reiwa Memoriam despite Japanese demographic and aging crisis, and with COVID-19 pandemic in the country, among 20 famous Japanese people who died peacefully due to illness and old age, including Seizō Fukumoto, Tochinoumi Teruyoshi, Shūichirō Moriyama, Isamu Akasaki, Masakazu Tamura, Osamu Kobayashi, Shunsuke Kikuchi, Takashi Tachibana, Ei-ichi Negishi, Takeshi Terauchi, Toshihide Maskawa, Jerry Fujio, Shinichiro Sawai, Wataru Takeshita, Takao Saito, Koichi Sugiyama, Mayumi Moriyama, Toshihiro Iijima, and Princess Kiko's father Tatsuhiko Kawashima. While unfortunately, among other famous Japanese people who died of tragic events, including Toshiro Kandagawa, Kōbō Kenichi, and Sonny Chiba from COVID-19 infections, and Sayaka Kanda from suicide.

=== January ===
- January 1 – Seizō Fukumoto, actor (b. 1943)
- January 29 – Tochinoumi Teruyoshi, sumo wrestler (b. 1938)

=== February ===
- February 8 – Shūichirō Moriyama, actor (b. 1934)
- February 17 – Tetsurō Sagawa, actor (b. 1937)
- February 25 – Masako Sugaya, voice actress (b. 1937)

=== March ===
- March 1 – Kirinji Kazuharu, sumo wrestler (b. 1953)
- March 15 – Yasuo Ōtsuka, animator (b. 1931)
- March 24
  - Toshihiko Koga, judoka (b. 1967)
  - Kunie Tanaka, actor (b. 1932)

=== April ===
- April 1 – Isamu Akasaki, engineer (b. 1929)
- April 3 – Masakazu Tamura, actor (b. 1943)
- April 4 – Sugako Hashida, screen writer (b. 1925)
- April 11 – Daisuke Ryu, actor (b. 1957)
- April 17 – Osamu Kobayashi, illustrator (b. 1964)
- April 24 – Shunsuke Kikuchi, composer (b. 1931)
- April 25 – Toshiro Kandagawa, chef (b. 1939)
- April 30 – Takashi Tachibana, journalist (b. 1940)

=== May ===
- May 6 – Kentaro Miura, manga artist (b. 1966)
- May 30 – Asei Kobayashi, composer (b. 1932)

=== June ===
- June 6 – Ei-ichi Negishi, chemist
- June 18 – Takeshi Terauchi, guitarist (b. 1939)
- June 21 – Nobuo Hara, jazz saxophonist (b. 1926)
- June 30 – Yasunori Oshima, baseball player (b. 1950)

=== July ===
- July 2 – Kōbō Kenichi, sumo wrestler (b. 1973)
- July 16 – Masatoshi Sakai, Japanese record producer (b. 1935)
- July 22 – Zentaro Watanabe, musician (b. 1963)
- July 23 – Toshihide Maskawa, theoretical physicist (b. 1940)
- July 28 – Satsuki Eda, politician (b. 1941)
- July 31 – Sanpei Satō, manga artist (b. 1929)

=== August ===
- August 2 – Hideki Hosaka, professional wrestler (b. 1971)
- August 3 – Yūsuke Kinoshita, baseball player (b. 1993)
- August 14 – Jerry Fujio, singer (b. 1940)
- August 16 – Hiroshi Sakagami, author (b. 1936)
- August 19 – Sonny Chiba, actor (b. 1939)

=== September ===
- September 3 – Shinichiro Sawai, film director (b. 1938)
- September 17 – Wataru Takeshita, politician (b. 1946)
- September 24 – Takao Saito, manga artist (b. 1936)
- September 30 – Koichi Sugiyama, composer (b. 1931)

=== October ===
- October 12 – Chie Nakane, anthropologist (b. 1927)
- October 14 – Mayumi Moriyama, politician and former Chief Cabinet Secretary (b. 1927)
- October 17
  - Toshihiro Iijima, television producer (b. 1932)
  - Gorō Maeda, comedian (b. 1942)

=== November ===
- November 3 – Yasuro Kikuchi, go player (b. 1929)
- November 4 – Tatsuhiko Kawashima, the father of princess Kawashima Kiko (b. 1940).
- November 8 – Kazuko Hosoki, fortune teller (b. 1938)
- November 9 – Jakucho Setouchi, Buddhist nun (b. 1922)
- November 12 – Takeshi Koba, baseball player (b. 1936)
- November 13 – Emi Wada, costume designer (b. 1937)
- November 28 – Nakamura Kichiemon II, kabuki actor (b. 1944)

=== December ===
- December 3 – Jōji Yanami, voice actor (b. 1931)
- December 8 – Mitsutoshi Furuya, manga artist (b. 1936)
- December 18 – Sayaka Kanda, actress and singer (b. 1986)

== See also ==
=== Country overviews ===
- Japan
- History of Japan
- Outline of Japan
- Government of Japan
- Politics of Japan
- Years in Japan
- Timeline of Japanese history

=== Related timelines for current period ===
- 2021
- 2020s
- 2020s in political history
