= List of 2021 box office number-one films in Japan =

The following is a list of 2021 box office number-one films in Japan by week. When the number-one film in gross is not the same as the number-one film in admissions, both are listed.

== Number-one films ==
†	This implies the highest-grossing movie of the year.

Week #	Date	Film	Gross	Notes
1	January 3, 2021	Demon Slayer: Kimetsu no Yaiba the Movie: Mugen Train	US$6,583,900	
2	January 10, 2021	Gintama: The Final	US$2,756,200	In attendance
2	January 10, 2021	Demon Slayer: Kimetsu no Yaiba the Movie: Mugen Train	US$2,871,300	In gross
3	January 17, 2021	Demon Slayer: Kimetsu no Yaiba the Movie: Mugen Train	US$1,957,200	
4	January 24, 2021	Demon Slayer: Kimetsu no Yaiba the Movie: Mugen Train	US$1,774,400	
5	January 31, 2021	We Made a Beautiful Bouquet	US$1,824,000	
6	February 7, 2021	We Made a Beautiful Bouquet	US$2,103,900	
7	February 14, 2021	We Made a Beautiful Bouquet	US$1,892,200	
8	February 21, 2021	We Made a Beautiful Bouquet	US$1,777,000	
9	February 28, 2021	We Made a Beautiful Bouquet	US$1,651,500	
10	March 7, 2021	We Made a Beautiful Bouquet	US$1,438,200	In attendance
10	March 7, 2021	Demon Slayer: Kimetsu no Yaiba the Movie: Mugen Train	US$1,502,700	In gross
11	March 14, 2021	Evangelion: 3.0+1.0 Thrice Upon a Time †	US$10,779,600	
12	March 21, 2021	Evangelion: 3.0+1.0 Thrice Upon a Time †	US$6,246,500	
13	March 28, 2021	Evangelion: 3.0+1.0 Thrice Upon a Time †	US$4,819,800	
14	April 4, 2021	Evangelion: 3.0+1.0 Thrice Upon a Time †	US$2,901,300	
15	April 11, 2021	Evangelion: 3.0+1.0 Thrice Upon a Time †	US$2,421,000	
16	April 18, 2021	Detective Conan: The Scarlet Bullet	US$14,834,300	
17	April 25, 2021	Detective Conan: The Scarlet Bullet	US$7,188,400	
18	May 2, 2021	Detective Conan: The Scarlet Bullet	US$4,135,400	
19	May 9, 2021	Detective Conan: The Scarlet Bullet	US$1,626,600	
20	May 16, 2021	Beautiful Lure	US$1,281,600	
21	May 23, 2021	A Morning of Farewell	US$1,361,000	
22	May 30, 2021	Rurouni Kenshin: The Final	US$1,039,300	
23	June 6, 2021	Rurouni Kenshin: The Beginning	US$3,068,100	
24	June 13, 2021	Evangelion: 3.0+1.0 Thrice Upon a Time †	US$2,425,200	In attendance
24	June 13, 2021	Mobile Suit Gundam: Hathaway	US$3,017,600	In gross
25	June 20, 2021	The Fable: The Killer Who Doesn't Kill	US$2,120,300	
26	June 27, 2021	The Fable: The Killer Who Doesn't Kill	US$1,301,300	
27	July 4, 2021	Godzilla vs. Kong	US$4,180,200	
28	July 11, 2021	Tokyo Revengers	US$4,791,200	
29	July 18, 2021	Belle	US$6,182,700	
30	July 25, 2021	Belle	US$4,747,500	
31	August 1, 2021	Belle	US$3,328,000	
32	August 8, 2021	F9	US$5,009,000	
33	August 15, 2021	F9	US$3,513,100	
34	August 22, 2021	F9	US$1,664,600	In gross
34	August 22, 2021	Kaguya-sama Final: Love Is War	US$1,491,800	In attendance
35	August 29, 2021	My Hero Academia: World Heroes' Mission	US$1,857,800	
36	September 5, 2021	Shang-Chi and the Legend of the Ten Rings	US$1,976,300	
37	September 12, 2021	My Hero Academia: World Heroes' Mission	US$1,407,300	
38	September 19, 2021	Masquerade Night	US$4,890,900	
39	September 26, 2021	Masquerade Night	US$3,141,200	
40	October 3, 2021	No Time to Die	US$3,880,100	
41	October 10, 2021	No Time to Die	US$2,571,000	
42	October 17, 2021	Baragaki: Unbroken Samurai	US$1,871,900	
43	October 24, 2021	Tropical-Rouge! Pretty Cure the Movie: The Snow Princess and the Miraculous Ring!	US$1,495,600	
44	October 31, 2021	Sword Art Online Progressive: Aria of a Starless Night	US$3,055,800	
45	November 7, 2021	Eternals	US$2,590,000	
46	November 14, 2021	Sumikko Gurashi The Movie: A Magical Child of the Blue Moonlit Night	US$1,351,500	
47	November 21, 2021	Sumikko Gurashi The Movie: A Magical Child of the Blue Moonlit Night	US$1,076,600	
48	November 28, 2021	Arashi Anniversary Tour 5×20 Film: Record of Memories	US$3,899,700	
49	December 5, 2021	Venom: Let There Be Carnage	US$4,029,700	
50	December 12, 2021	Your Turn to Kill: The Movie	US$3,011,300	
51	December 19, 2021	The Matrix Resurrections	US$2,644,500	
52	December 26, 2021	Jujutsu Kaisen 0	US$14,170,100	

== Highest-grossing films ==
International film Japanese film

Highest-grossing films of 2021 in Japan
Rank	Title	Gross
1	Evangelion: 3.0+1.0 Thrice Upon a Time	¥10.28 billion ($93.67 million)
2	Detective Conan: The Scarlet Bullet	¥7.65 billion ($69.7 million)
3	Belle	¥6.60 billion ($60.14 million)
4	Arashi Anniversary Tour 5×20 Film: Record of Memories	¥4.55 billion ($41.46 million)
5	Tokyo Revengers	¥4.50 billion ($41 million)
6	Rurouni Kenshin: The Final	¥4.35 billion ($39.64 million)
7	The Untold Tale of the Three Kingdoms	¥4.03 billion ($36.72 million)
8	We Made a Beautiful Bouquet	¥3.81 billion ($34.72 million)
8	Masquerade Night	¥3.81 billion ($34.72 million)
10	F9	¥3.67 billion ($33.44 million)

== See also ==
- List of Japanese films of 2021
