= List of Japanese films of 2021 =

This is a list of Japanese films that are scheduled to release in 2021.

== Highest-grossing films ==
The following is a list of the 10 highest-grossing Japanese films released at the Japanese box office during 2021.

Rank	Title	Gross
1	Evangelion: 3.0+1.0 Thrice Upon a Time	¥10.28 billion ($93.67 million)
2	Detective Conan: The Scarlet Bullet	¥7.65 billion ($69.7 million)
3	Belle	¥6.60 billion ($60.14 million)
4	Arashi Anniversary Tour 5×20 Film: Record of Memories	¥4.55 billion ($41.46 million)
5	Tokyo Revengers	¥4.50 billion ($41 million)
6	Rurouni Kenshin: The Final	¥4.35 billion ($39.64 million)
7	The Untold Tale of the Three Kingdoms	¥4.03 billion ($36.72 million)
8	We Made a Beautiful Bouquet	¥3.81 billion ($34.72 million)
8	Masquerade Night	¥3.81 billion ($34.72 million)
10	My Hero Academia: World Heroes' Mission	¥3.39 billion ($30.89 million)

== Film releases ==
=== January–March ===
Opening		Title	Director	Cast	Ref(s)
J A N U A R Y	1	Seitokai Yakuindomo 2	Hiromitsu Kanazawa	Shintarō Asanuma, Yōko Hikasa, Satomi Satō, Sayuri Yahagi, Satomi Arai, Chiaki Omigawa, Yū Kobayashi, Asami Shimoda	
J A N U A R Y	8	Pretty Guardian Sailor Moon Eternal The Movie -Part I-	Chiaki Kon	Kotono Mitsuishi, Hisako Kanemoto, Rina Satō, Ami Koshimizu, Shizuka Itō, Misato Fukuen, Kenji Nojima, Junko Minagawa, Sayaka Ohara, Ai Maeda, Yukiyo Fujii, Ryō Hirohashi, Taishi Murata, Shoko Nakagawa, Naomi Watanabe, Nanao	
J A N U A R Y	8	Gintama: The Final	Takashi Koizumi	Tomokazu Sugita, Daisuke Sakaguchi, Rie Kugimiya, Mikako Takahashi, Akira Ishida, Takehito Koyasu	
J A N U A R Y	8	Angry Rice Wives	Katsuhide Motoki	Mao Inoue, Takahiro Miura, Mari Natsuki, Shinosuke Tatekawa, Mitsuru Fukikoshi, Sawa Suzuki	
J A N U A R Y	8	Perfect Strangers	Michio Mitsuno	Noriyuki Higashiyama, Honami Suzuki, Takako Tokiwa, Toru Masuoka, Hiromasa Taguchi, Haruka Kinami	
J A N U A R Y	15	Natsume's Book of Friends: The Waking Rock and the Strange Visitor	Takahiro Omori, Hideaki Itō	Hiroshi Kamiya, Kazuhiko Inoue, Kazuma Horie, Takaya Kuroda, Akemi Okamura, Chō, Takashi Matsuyama, Hiroshi Shimozaki, Hisako Kanemoto	
J A N U A R Y	15	Over the Years: Lovers	Gao Chen-di	Kazunobu Mineta, Manami Hashimoto, Pipi Yao, Oscar Zhou, Yu Pei-Jen, Yu Hongxiu, Nahana	
J A N U A R Y	16	Nezura 1964	Hiroto Yokokawa	Yukijirō Hotaru, Kazuma Yoneyama, Norman England, Ippei Osako, Yoshiro Uchida, Shirō Sano, Noboru Sato, Mai Saito, Mach Fumiake, Masanori Kikuzawa, Himawari Ono, Bin Furuya, Akira Ohashi	
J A N U A R Y	22	The Night Beyond the Tricornered Window	Yukihiro Morigaki	Masaki Okada, Jun Shison, Yurina Hirate, Kenichi Takitō, Michitaka Tsutsui, Makita Sports	
J A N U A R Y	29	The Master Plan	Yūichi Satō	Takanori Iwata, Mackenyu Arata, Anna Yamada, Anne Nakamura, Kenjirō Ishimaru, Kohei Otomo, Akira Emoto	
J A N U A R Y	29	A Family	Michihito Fujii	Gō Ayano, Hiroshi Tachi, Machiko Ono, Yukiya Kitamura, Hayato Ichihara, Hayato Isomura	
J A N U A R Y	29	We Made a Beautiful Bouquet	Nobuhiro Doi	Masaki Suda, Kasumi Arimura, Kaya Kiyohara, Kanata Hosoda, Hanae Kan, Haya Nakazaki, Hisato Kokubo, Kumi Takiuchi	
J A N U A R Y	29	Photograph of Memories	Naoto Kumazawa	Mai Fukagawa, Kengo Kora, Karina Nose, Arata Iura, Ikko Furuya, Kazuko Yoshiyuki	
F E B R U A R Y	5	The Cinderella Addiction	Ryohei Watanabe	Tao Tsuchiya, Kei Tanaka, Coco, Anna Yamada, Teacher, Wako Ando, Miho Kanazawa, Atom Mizuishi, Yasuhi Nakamura, Bokuzo Masana	
F E B R U A R Y	5	Horimiya & Co.	Hana Matsumoto	Ouji Suzuka, Sayu Kubota, Haru Takagi, Jin Suzuki, Rion Okamoto, Akira Onodera, Aya Marsh, Sakura, Ryōsuke Sota	
F E B R U A R Y	5	Suicide Forest Village	Takashi Shimizu	Anna Yamada, Mayu Yamaguchi, Fuju Kamio, Yuki Kura, Haruka Kudo, Rinka Otani	
F E B R U A R Y	11	Pretty Guardian Sailor Moon Eternal The Movie -Part II-	Chiaki Kon	Kotono Mitsuishi, Hisako Kanemoto, Rina Satō, Ami Koshimizu, Shizuka Itō, Misato Fukuen, Kenji Nojima, Junko Minagawa, Sayaka Ohara, Ai Maeda, Yukiyo Fujii, Ryō Hirohashi, Taishi Murata, Shoko Nakagawa, Naomi Watanabe, Nanao	
F E B R U A R Y	11	Princess Principal: Crown Handler – Chapter 1	Masaki Tachibana	Aoi Koga, Akira Sekine, Yō Taichi, Akari Kageyama, Nozomi Furuki, Takayuki Sugō, Miyuki Sawashiro, Takumi Yamazaki, Takaya Hashi, Yūko Iida	
F E B R U A R Y	12	Under the Open Sky	Miwa Nishikawa	Kōji Yakusho, Taiga Nakano, Isao Hashizume, Yukiya Kitamura, Hakuryu, Midoriko Kimura, Masami Nagasawa	
F E B R U A R Y	12	First Love	Yukihiko Tsutsumi	Keiko Kitagawa, Tomoya Nakamura, Kyoko Yoshine, Itsuji Itao, Hoshi Ishida, Sho Kiyohara	
F E B R U A R Y	19	Liar × Liar	Saiji Yakumo	Nana Mori, Hokuto Matsumura, Yuta Koseki, Mayu Hotta, Ryuya Shimekake, Shunya Itabashi	
F E B R U A R Y	19	In Those Days	Rikiya Imaizumi	Tori Matsuzaka, Taiga Nakano, Takashi Yamanaka, Ryuya Wakaba, Tateto Serizawa, Kentaro Kokado, Hiroto Oshita, Kenta Kiguchi	
F E B R U A R Y	19	The Pledge to Megumi	Show Nobushi	Natsuki Kasa, Daijiro Harada, Tomoko Ishimura, Gitan Ohtsuru, Masao Komatsu, Mineko Nishikawa	
F E B R U A R Y	20	Mashin Sentai Kiramager THE MOVIE: Bee-Bop Dream	Kyohei Yamaguchi	Rio Komiya, Rui Kihara, Yume Shinjo, Atomu Mizuishi, Mio Kudo, Kohei Shoji, Daimaou Kosaka, Inori Minase, Mitsu Dan	
F E B R U A R Y	20	Kikai Sentai Zenkaiger The Movie: Red Battle! All Sentai Rally!!	Shojiro Nakazawa	Kiita Komagine, Shintarō Asanuma, Yuki Kaji, Yume Miyamoto, Takuya Sato	
F E B R U A R Y	26	Aristocrats	Yukiko Sode	Mugi Kadowaki, Kiko Mizuhara, Kengo Kora, Shizuka Ishibashi, Rio Yamashita, Kenta Satoi, Yukiko Shinohara, Kei Ishibashi, Takashi Yamanaka, Ryoka Minamide	
F E B R U A R Y	26	Under the Turquoise Sky	Kentaro	Yuya Yagira, Sahel Rosa, Akaji Maro, Jun Nishiyama, Taro Suwa, Nori Sato	
M A R C H	5	The Sun Stands Still	Eiichirō Hasumi	Tatsuya Fujiwara, Ryoma Takeuchi, Han Hyo-joo, Byun Yo-han, Hayato Ichihara, Sara Minami, Kōichi Satō, Arisa Yagi	
M A R C H	5	Aria the Crepusculo	Junichi Sato, Takahiro Natori	Ryō Hirohashi, Rina Satō, Ai Kayano, Akeno Watanabe, Erino Hazuki, Sayaka Ohara	
M A R C H	5	No Call No Life	Aya Igashi	Mio Yūki, Yuki Inoue, Atsuhiro Inukai, Sakurako Konishi, Aina Yamada, Kita Komagine, Atsushi Shinohara, Rikuto Kumaki	
M A R C H	8	Evangelion: 3.0+1.0 Thrice Upon a Time	Hideaki Anno	Megumi Ogata, Megumi Hayashibara, Yūko Miyamura, Maaya Sakamoto, Kotono Mitsuishi	
M A R C H	12	Brave: Gunjō Senki	Katsuyuki Motohiro	Mackenyu, Haruma Miura, Hirona Yamazaki, Kenichi Matsuyama, Tatsuomi Hamada, Jin Suzuki, Shodai Fukuyama, Takuro Nagata	
M A R C H	12	Love, Life and Goldfish	Yukinori Makabe	Onoe Matsuya II, Kanako Momota, Hayato Kakizawa, Nichole Ishida, Hiroshi Yazaki, Hitoe Okubo, Misato Shimizu, Mizuki Tsujimoto	
M A R C H	19	Healin' Good Pretty Cure: GoGo! Big Transformation! The Town of Dreams	Akira Ikeda	Aoi Yūki, Natsu Yorita, Hiyori Kono, Suzuko Mimori, Ai Kakuma, Hana Takeda	
M A R C H	19	Tropical-Rouge! Precure: Petite Dive! Collaboration Dance Party!	Takashi Otsuka	Ai Fairouz, Yumiri Hanamori, Yui Ishikawa, Asami Seto, Rina Hidaka, Aimi Tanaka	
M A R C H	19	Caution, Hazardous Wives!	Tōya Satō	Haruka Ayase, Hidetoshi Nishijima, Kosuke Suzuki, Kenshi Okada, Atsuko Maeda, Shingo Tsurumi, Naomasa Musaka, Shirō Sano	
M A R C H	19	You're Not Normal, Either	Kōji Maeda	Ryo Narita, Kaya Kiyohara, Kasumi Yamaya, Yuki Kura, Rika Izumi, Kotaro Koizumi	
M A R C H	26	Kiba: The Fangs of Fiction	Daihachi Yoshida	Yo Oizumi, Mayu Matsuoka, Kōichi Sato, Elaiza Ikeda, Hio Miyazawa, Takumi Saitoh, Tomoya Nakamura	
M A R C H	26	The Blue Danube	Akira Ikeda	Kou Maehara, Hiroki Konno, Hiroki Nakajima, Naoya Shimizu, Manami Hashimoto, Tarō Yabe, Kyūsaku Shimada, Hairi Katagiri	
M A R C H	26	Zero-One Others: Kamen Rider MetsubouJinrai	Masaya Kakehi	Daisuke Nakagawa, Syuya Sunagawa, Daichi Yamaguchi, Satsuki Nakayama, Noa Tsurushima, Jai West	

=== April–June ===
Opening		Title	Director	Cast	Ref(s)
A P R I L	2	Signal the Movie	Hajime Hashimoto	Kentaro Sakaguchi, Michiko Kichise, Kazuki Kitamura, Yuichi Kimura, Tetsuhiro Ikeda, Kaede Aono, Tetta Sugimoto, Nao	
A P R I L	2	Zokki	Naoto Takenaka, Takayuki Yamada, Takumi Saitoh	Riho Yoshioka, Fuku Suzuki, Shinnosuke Mitsushima, Yurina Yanagi, Sara Minami, Masanobu Ando, Pierre Taki, Yusaku Mori, Joe Kujo, Aso Kiryu	
A P R I L	2	Over the Town	Rikiya Imaizumi	Ryuya Wakaba, Moeka Hoshi, Kotone Furukawa, Minori Hagiwara, Seina Nakata, Yukino Murakami, Yuto Endo, Shiori Ueno	
A P R I L	2	Homunculus	Takashi Shimizu	Gō Ayano, Ryo Narita, Yukino Kishii, Anna Ishii, Seiyō Uchino	
A P R I L	9	My Blood & Bones in a Flowing Galaxy	Sabu	Taishi Nakagawa, Anna Ishii, Kai Inowaki, Kaya Kiyohara, Airi Matsui, Takumi Kitamura	
A P R I L	9	The Supporting Actors: The Movie	Daigo Matsui	Tomorowo Taguchi, Yutaka Matsushige, Ken Mitsuishi, Kenichi Endō, Gaku Hamada, Tokio Emoto, Mirai Shida, Nanao, Mahiro Takasugi, Kyoko Yoshine, Yosuke Sugino, Amane Okayama, Masanobu Katsumura, Miyu Honda, Kasumi Arimura, Daichi Kaneko	
A P R I L	9	A Garden of Camellias	Yoshihiko Ueda	Sumiko Fuji, Shim Eun-kyung, Seiichi Tanabe, Koji Shimizu, Junko Uchida, Ayu Kitamura, Toko Miura, Shōhei Uno	
A P R I L	9	Blue	Keisuke Yoshida	Kenichi Matsuyama, Fumino Kimura, Tokio Emoto, Masahiro Higashide, Shuto Moriya, Ayuri Yoshinaga, Kinya Nagase, Shinichiro Matsuura	
A P R I L	10	Osaka Loan Shark	Ishihara Takahiro	Masaki Reiya, Sakakibara Tetsuji, Asai Daichi	
A P R I L	16	Detective Conan: The Scarlet Bullet	Chika Nagaoka	Minami Takayama, Wakana Yamazaki, Rikiya Koyama, Kappei Yamaguchi, Kenichi Ogata, Megumi Hayashibara, Yukiko Iwai, Ikue Ōtani	
A P R I L	23	BanG Dream! Episode of Roselia	Kōdai Kakimoto, Atsushi Mimura	Aina Aiba, Haruka Kudō, Yuki Nakashima, Megu Sakuragawa, Kanon Shizaki	
A P R I L	23	Rurouni Kenshin: The Final	Keishi Ōtomo	Takeru Satoh, Emi Takei, Mackenyu, Munetaka Aoki, Yū Aoi, Tao Tsuchiya, Kasumi Arimura, Yōsuke Eguchi, Ryunosuke Kamiki	
A P R I L	29	Mashin Sentai Kiramager VS. Ryusoulger	Koichi Sakamoto	Rio Komiya, Rui Kihara, Yume Shinjo, Atomu Mizuishi, Mio Kudo, Kohei Shoji, Hayate Ichinose, Keito Tsuna, Ichika Osaki, Yuito Obara, Tatsuya Kishida, Katsumi Hyodo, Inori Minase, Sora Tamaki, Nashiko Momotsuki	
A P R I L	29	Funny Bunny	Satoshi Kenmochi	Taishi Nakagawa, Amane Okayama, Megumi Seki, Kokora Morita, Yukino Goto, Rainy, Yutaro, Shunsuke Tanaka	
M A Y	7	Love and the Grand Tug-of-war	Kiyoshi Sasabe	Takahiro Miura, Kang Ji-young, Manami Higa, Mako Ishino	
M A Y	12	Remain in Twilight	Daigo Matsui	Ryo Narita, Kengo Kora, Ryuya Wakaba, Kisetsu Fujiwara, Kenta Hamano, Rikki Metsugi, Atsuko Maeda, Yu Shirota, Marie Iitoyo, Rio Uchida, Kika Kobayashi	
M A Y	21	A Morning of Farewell	Izuru Narushima	Sayuri Yoshinaga, Tori Matsuzaka, Suzu Hirose, Yoko Minamino, Toshirō Yanagiba, Eiko Koike, Yusuke Iseya, Shigeru Izumiya	
M A Y	21	Gekijouban Police × Heroine Lovepatrina!: ~Kaitou kara no Chousen!, Rabu de patto Taihoseyo!~	Takashi Miike	Miyu Watanabe, Rina Yamaguchi, Yui Yamashita, Yūra Sugiura, Minami Hishida, Kira Yamaguchi, Toa Harada, Ran Ishii, Keiji Kuroki, Saeko Kamijou, Seishiro Kato, Shingo Yanagisawa	
M A Y	21	End-of-Life Concierge	Hideyuki Katsuki	Masaru Mizuho, Isao Hashizume, Atsuko Takahata, Yuki Matsushita	
M A Y	21	Jigoku no Hanazono: Office Royale	Kazuaki Seki	Mei Nagano, Alice Hirose, Nanao, Rina Kawaei, Miyuki Oshima, Satoru Matsuo, Tomomi Maruyama, Masanobu Katsumura, Eiko Koike	
M A Y	28	Hokusai	Hajime Hashimoto	Yūya Yagira, Min Tanaka, Hiroshi Abe, Eita, Hiroshi Tamaki, Miori Takimoto, Kanji Tsuda, Munetaka Aoki, Seishū Uragami, Haruka Imou	
M A Y	28	Tomorrow's Dinner Table	Takahisa Zeze	Miho Kanno, Mitsuki Takahata, Machiko Ono, Ryo Togawa	
J U N E	1	Kakegurui – Compulsive Gambler Part 2	Tsutomu Hanabusa	Minami Hamabe, Mahiro Takasugi, Aoi Morikawa, Ruka Matsuda, Yūma Yamoto, Taishi Nakagawa, Natsumi Okamoto, Miki Yanagi, Sayuri Matsumura, Elaiza Ikeda, Ryusei Fujii	
J U N E	4	Rurouni Kenshin: The Beginning	Keishi Ōtomo	Takeru Satoh, Kasumi Arimura, Issey Takahashi, Nijiro Murakami, Masanobu Ando, Kazuki Kitamura, Yōsuke Eguchi, Towa Araki, Mayu Hotta, Masataka Kubota	
J U N E	4	Pompo: The Cinéphile	Takayuki Hirao	Hiroya Shimizu, Konomi Kohara, Rinka Otani, Ai Kakuma	
J U N E	4	Brothers in Brothel	Takumi Saitoh, Jiro Sato	Takayuki Yamada, Riisa Naka, Yoko Kondo, Ririne Sasano	
J U N E	4	Revue Starlight the Movie	Tomohiro Furukawa	Momoyo Koyama, Suzuko Mimori, Maho Tomita, Aina Aiba, Haruki Iwata, Hinata Satō	
J U N E	4	HeartBeats	Hiroto Takahashi	Hidaka Ukisho, Sei Shiraishi, Mizuki Itagaki, Naoka Hara, Hana Kawamura, Jiei Wakabayashi	
J U N E	4	Gray Zone	Hiroshi	Hiroshi, Manaka Nishihara, Hikaru Aoyama, Soto Kurojo, Nana Wada, Yuji Naniwa	
J U N E	4	Knights of Sidonia: Love Woven in the Stars	Hiroyuki Seshita, Tadahiro Yoshihira	Ryōta Ōsaka, Aya Suzaki, Aki Toyosaki, Hisako Kanemoto, Takahiro Sakurai, Ayane Sakura, Eri Kitamura, Sayaka Ohara	
J U N E	11	Fortune Favors Lady Nikuko	Ayumu Watanabe	Shinobu Otake, Cocomi, Natsuki Hanae, Hiro Shimono, Ikuji Nakamura, Riho Yoshioka, Matsuko Deluxe, Izumi Ishii	
J U N E	11	Farewell, My Dear Cramer	Seiki Takuno	Miyuri Shimabukuro, Shion Wakayama, Kōki Uchiyama, Ryōta Ōsaka	
J U N E	11	Character	Akira Nagai	Masaki Suda, Fukase, Shun Oguri, Mitsuki Takahata, Nakamura Shidō II, Yoshiki Fujieda	
J U N E	11	Mobile Suit Gundam: Hathaway's Flash	Shūkō Murase	Kenshō Ono, Reina Ueda, Junichi Suwabe, Soma Saito, Kenjiro Tsuda, Yui Ishikawa	
J U N E	16	The Fable: The Killer Who Doesn't Kill	Kan Eguchi	Junichi Okada, Fumino Kimura, Yurina Hirate, Shinichi Tsutsumi, Mizuki Yamamoto, Masanobu Ando, Jun Kurose, Yoshi Inoshita	
J U N E	18	Chocolat The Chocolate Witch	Tomonobu Moriwaki	Maho Yamaguchi, Yui Okada, Ken Nakajima, Hiyori Sakurada, Mei Hata	
J U N E	18	She Came	Tatsuya Yamanishi	Kou Maehara, Hana Amano, Nao, Hirona Murata, Shusaku Kamikawa	
J U N E	18	Jump!! The Heroes Behind the Gold	Ken Iizuka	Kei Tanaka, Tao Tsuchiya, Yūki Yamada, Gordon Maeda, Atsushi Maeda, Nao Kosaka, Motoki Ochiai, Takayuki Hamatsu	
J U N E	18	Rika: Love Obsessed Psycho	Tsukuru Matsuki	Saki Takaoka, Hayato Ichihara, Rio Uchida, Kenji Mizuhashi, Ryutaro Okada, Naohiro Yamamoto	
J U N E	18	Aoba Family's Table	Soshi Matsumoto	Naomi Nishida, Miwako Ichikawa, Aino Kuribayashi, Uta Yorikawa	
J U N E	25	Arc	Kei Ishikawa	Kyoko Yoshine, Shinobu Terajima, Masaki Okada, Kurumi Shimizu, Kai Inowaki, Tsubasa Nakagawa	
J U N E	25	Ito	Satoko Yokohama	Ren Komai, Mei Kurokawa, Mayuu Yokota, Ayumu Nakajima	
J U N E	25	The Door into Summer	Takahiro Miki	Kento Yamazaki, Kaya Kiyohara, Naohito Fujiki, Natsuna, Hidekazu Majima, Rin Takanashi	
J U N E	25	The Journey	Kōbun Shizuno	Tōru Furuya, Hiroshi Kamiya, Yuichi Nakamura, Kazuya Nakai, Kotono Mitsuishi, Takaya Kuroda	

=== July–September ===
Opening		Title	Director	Cast	Ref(s)
J U L Y	2	The Asian Angel	Yuya Ishii	Sosuke Ikematsu, Joe Odagiri, Choi Hee-seo, Kim Min-jae, Kim Ye-eun	
J U L Y	2	Napoleon and Me	Yusuke Koroyasu	Rina Takeda, Shogo Hama, Aya Ayano, Yuka Okabayashi, Asuka Nagayoshi, Sara Shiratori	
J U L Y	2	The Seven Deadly Sins: Cursed by Light	Takayuki Hamana	Yuki Kaji, Sora Amamiya, Misaki Kuno, Aoi Yūki, Tatsuhisa Suzuki, Jun Fukuyama, Yuhei Takagi	
J U L Y	9	Honey Lemon Soda	Kōji Shintoku	Raul, Ai Yoshikawa, Mayu Hotta, Tatsuomi Hamada, Ryota Bando, Natsumi Okamoto	
J U L Y	9	The Crocodile That Lived for 100 Days	Shinichiro Ueda, Miyuki Fukuda	Ryūnosuke Kamiki, Tomoya Nakamura, Subaru Kimura, Yuko Araki, First Summer Uika, Kaito, Kurumi Shimizu, Nobue Iketani	
J U L Y	9	Kakushigoto	Yūta Murano	Hiroshi Kamiya, Rie Takahashi, Taku Yashiro, Kiyono Yasuno, Ayane Sakura, Ayumu Murase, Natsuki Hanae	
J U L Y	9	Tokyo Revengers	Tsutomu Hanabusa	Takumi Kitamura, Yūki Yamada, Yosuke Sugino, Nobuyuki Suzuki, Hayato Isomura, Shotaro Mamiya, Ryo Yoshizawa, Gordon Maeda, Hiroya Shimizu, Kazuki Horike, Mio Imada, Shuji Tagawa, Hinata Toda, Rion Takahashi	
J U L Y	16	Belle	Mamoru Hosoda	Kaho Nakamura, Takeru Satoh, Ryo Narita, Shōta Sometani, Tina Tamashiro, Lilas Ikuta, Toshiyuki Morikawa, Kenjiro Tsuda, Mami Koyama, Mamoru Miyano, Michiko Shimizu, Fuyumi Sakamoto, Yoshimi Iwasaki, Shachiyo Nakao	
J U L Y	16	Kud Wafter	Kentarō Suzuki	Naomi Wakabayashi, Yui Horie, Tomoe Tamiyasu, Hikaru Midorikawa, Nobutoshi Canna, Yusei Oda	
J U L Y	16	Country Beyond Starry Skies	Kazuya Konaka	Ouji Suzuka, Shiori Akita, Yusuke Sato, Rica Ihara, May Fukuda, Kokoro Hirasawa, Mayu Takahashi, Takuji Kawakubo, Narimi Arimori	
J U L Y	22	Words Bubble Up Like Soda Pop	Kyōhei Ishiguro	Somegoro Ichikawa XIII, Hana Sugisaki, Megumi Han, Natsuki Hanae, Yūichirō Umehara, Megumi Nakajima, Sumire Morohoshi, Hiroshi Kamiya, Maaya Sakamoto, Kōichi Yamadera	
J U L Y	22	Doggies Club!	Tetsuo Shinohara	Kento Hayashi, Taishi Nakagawa, Sakurako Ohara, Kodai Asaka, Momoko Tanabe, Tamae Ando, Harumi Shuhama, Ryota Bando, Rena Tanaka	
J U L Y	22	Kamen Rider Saber + Kikai Sentai Zenkaiger: Super Hero Senki	Ryuta Tasaki	Shuichiro Naito, Kiita Komagine, Fuku Suzuki, Takaya Yamaguchi, Asuka Kawazu, Ryo Aoki, Shintaro Asanuma, Yuki Kaji, Yume Miyamoto, Takuya Sato, Atsuki Mashiko, Ayumi Tanida, Yuki Ikushima, Eiji Togashi, Hiroaki Oka, Tomohiro Ichikawa, Ken Shonozaki, Mei Angela, Rina Chinen, Ikue Sakakibara, Mao Ichimichi, Toshihiko Seki, So Okuno, Shogo Suzuki, Atomu Mizuishi, Fumiya Takahashi, Hiroshi Fujioka, Ryota Suzuki, Satsumi Matsuda	
J U L Y	30	Tom and Sawyer in the City	Hayato Kawai	Kairi Joe, Sakai Daichi, Watanabe Shinyu, Daichi Yoshiwara, Shinra Yamashita, Raichi Yoshiwara, Shinra Yamashita, Rikimaru, Hiroto Tamura	
J U L Y	30	Crayon Shin-chan: Shrouded in Mystery! The Flowers of Tenkazu Academy	Wataru Takahashi	Yumiko Kobayashi, Miki Narahashi, Toshiyuki Morikawa, Satomi Kōrogi, Mari Mashiba, Tamao Hayashi, Teiyū Ichiryūsai, Chie Satō	
J U L Y	30	Baby Assassins	Yugo Sakamoto	Akari Takaishi, Saori Izawa, Masanori Mimoto, Atomu Mizuishi, Yasukaze Motomiya	
A U G U S T	6	It's a Flickering Life	Yoji Yamada	Kenji Sawada, Masaki Suda, Mei Nagano, Nobuko Miyamoto, Yojiro Noda, Nenji Kobayashi, Shinobu Terajima, Keiko Kitagawa, Lily Franky, Jun Shison, Oshiro Maeda	
A U G U S T	6	Gift of Fire	Hiroshi Kurosaki	Yūya Yagira, Kasumi Arimura, Haruma Miura, Issey Ogata, Shinya Yamamoto, Peter Stormare, Masaki Miura, Shohei Uno	
A U G U S T	6	My Hero Academia: World Heroes' Mission	Kenji Nagasaki	Daiki Yamashita, Kenta Miyake, Nobuhiko Okamoto, Yuki Kaji, Yuichi Nakamura, Tetsu Inada, Ryo Yoshizawa, Kazuya Nakai	
A U G U S T	6	It’s a Summer Film	Soushi Matsumoto	Marika Itō, Daichi Kaneko, Yuumi Kawai, Kirara Inori, Shunya Itabashi, Mayu Koda, Yutaro, Seiichi Kohinata	
A U G U S T	13	The Great Yokai War: Guardians	Takashi Miike	Kokoro Terada, Hana Sugisaki, Ray Inomata, Sakura Ando, Koji Okura, Takahiro Miura, Yuko Oshima, Eiji Akaso, Sumire, Kazuki Kitamura, Nanako Matsushima	
A U G U S T	20	Last of the Wolves	Kazuya Shiraishi	Tori Matsuzaka, Ryohei Suzuki, Nijiro Murakami, Nanase Nishino, Nakamura Baijaku II, Taichi Saotome	
A U G U S T	20	Drive My Car	Ryusuke Hamaguchi	Hidetoshi Nishijima, Tōko Miura, Reika Kirishima, Masaki Okada	
A U G U S T	20	One Summer Story	Shuichi Okita	Moka Kamishiraishi, Kanata Hosoda, Yudai Chiba, Kanji Furutachi, Yuki Saito, Etsushi Toyokawa	
A U G U S T	25	Earwig and the Witch	Gorō Miyazaki	Kokoro Hirasawa, Shinobu Terajima, Etsushi Toyokawa, Gaku Hamada, Sherina Munaf, Yuji Ueda	
A U G U S T	25	Kin-iro Mosaic: Thank You!!	Munenori Nawa	Asuka Nishi, Manami Tanaka, Risa Taneda, Yumi Uchiyama, Nao Tōyama, Ayaka Suwa	
A U G U S T	25	Ninja Girl	Yu Irie	Saki Fukuda, Mutsuo Yoshioka, Neya Ryoka, Arata Iura	
A U G U S T	27	Kaguya-sama Final: Love Is War	Hayato Kawai	Sho Hirano, Kanna Hashimoto, Hayato Sano, Nana Asakawa, Yuuka Kageyama, Mayu Hotta, Haruka Fukuhara, Shunya Ishibashi, Fumiya Takahashi	
A U G U S T	27	The Abandoned House by the Cape	Shin'ya Kawatsura	Mana Ashida, Takuya Tasso, Shinobu Otake, Awano Sari	
A U G U S T	27	Every Trick in the Book	Hideta Takahata	Tatsuya Fujiwara, Tao Tsuchiya, Shunsuke Kazama, Nanase Nishino, Etsushi Toyokawa	
A U G U S T	27	Zero-One Others: Kamen Rider Vulcan & Valkyrie	Masaya Kakehi	Ryutaro Okada, Hiroe Igeta, Noa Tsurushima, Ken Sugawara, Yui Narumi, Ami 201	
S E P T E M B E R	3	Ryoma! The Prince of Tennis	Hiroshi Kōjina	Junko Minagawa, Takashi Matsuyama, Mikako Takahashi, Ryōtarō Okiayu, Junichi Suwabe, Tomokazu Sugita	
S E P T E M B E R	10	The Master	Hatsuki Yoko	Akira 100%, Megumi Abe, Maki Miyamoto, Yoshiyuki Morishita, Hideo Sakaki, Yamaguchi Shigehiro	
S E P T E M B E R	10	Morning Sun Lies on the Beach	Yuki Tanada	Mitsuki Takahata, Kayoko Okubo, Kyotaro Yanagiya	
S E P T E M B E R	10	The Woman of SRI: The Movie	Ryosuke Kanesaki	Yasuko Sawaguchi, Mayumi Wakamura, Toru Kazama, Saito Satoru, Shu Watanabe, Hikaru Yamamoto	
S E P T E M B E R	10	Moonlight Shadow	Edmund Yeo	Nana Komatsu, Hio Miyazawa, Asami Usuda, Himi Sato	
S E P T E M B E R	17	Masquerade Night	Masayuki Suzuki	Takuya Kimura, Masami Nagasawa, Fumiyo Kohinata, Yuki Izumisawa, Toshihide Tonesaku, Ren Ishikawa, Anne Nakamura	
S E P T E M B E R	17	Free! The Final Stroke	Eisaku Kawanami	Nobunaga Shimazaki, Tatsuhisa Suzuki, Tsubasa Yonaga, Daisuke Hirakawa, Mamoru Miyano, Yoshimasa Hosoya	
S E P T E M B E R	17	A Balance	Yujiro Harumoto	Kumi Takiuchi, Ken Mitsuishi, Yuumi Kawai, Masahiro Umeda, Yuya Matsuura	
S E P T E M B E R	17	Eternally Younger Than Those Idiots	Ryuhei Yoshino	Yui Sakuma, Nao, Show Kasamatsu, Seiichi Kohinata	
S E P T E M B E R	17	Teacher, Please Sit Next to Me?	Takahiro Horie	Haru Kuroki, Tasuku Emoto, Daichi Kaneko, Nao, Jun Fubuki	
S E P T E M B E R	23	Princess Principal: Crown Handler – Chapter 2	Masaki Tachibana	Aoi Koga, Akira Sekine, Yō Taichi, Akari Kageyama, Nozomi Furuki, Takayuki Sugō, Miyuki Sawashiro, Hiroyuki Honda, Takumi Yamazaki, Takaya Hashi, Yūko Iida, Teruyuki Tanzawa, Rina Endō, Kazuyuki Okitsu	
S E P T E M B E R	24	Intolerance	Keisuke Yoshida	Arata Furuta, Tori Matsuzaka, Tomoko Tabata, Keisetsu Fujiwara, Shuri, Shinobu Terajima	
S E P T E M B E R	24	First Gentleman	Hayato Kawai	Kei Tanaka, Miki Nakatani, Shihori Kanjiya, Asuka Kudoh, Airi Matsui, Houka Kinoshita	
S E P T E M B E R	24	My Daddy	Junichi Kanai	Tsuyoshi Muro, Noa Nakata, Nao, Katsuya Maiguma, Asami Usuda	

=== October–December ===
Opening		Title	Director	Cast	Ref(s)
O C T O B E R	1	In the Wake	Takahisa Zeze	Takeru Satoh, Hiroshi Abe, Kaya Kiyohara, Kento Hayashi, Eita Nagayama, Naoto Ogata	
O C T O B E R	1	Chasing the Light	Yoichi Narita	Tsubasa Nakagawa, Kiyoshi Nagasawa, Rina Ikoma, Sena Nakajima, Taro Suruga, Hayato Onozuka	
O C T O B E R	1	My Father's Tracks	Renpei Tsukamoto	Win Morisaki, Mai Fukagawa, Masahiko Nishimura, Riki Takeuchi, Ryuta Sato, Shunsuke Tanaka	
O C T O B E R	1	DIVOC-12	Various	Sumiko Fuji, Kisetsu Fujiwara, Aju Makita, Shuri Nakamura, Yuri Nakamura, Mansaku Takata, Atsuko Maeda	
O C T O B E R	8	Star Blazers: Space Battleship Yamato 2205	Kenji Yasuda	Daisuke Ono, Houko Kuwashima, Hōchū Ōtsuka, Kōichi Yamadera, Kikuko Inoue, Masuo Amada, Tasuku Hatanaka, Nobuhiko Okamoto	
O C T O B E R	8	Macross Delta the Movie: Absolute Live!!!!!!	Shōji Kawamori	Yūma Uchida, Minori Suzuki, Asami Seto, Ami Koshimizu, Kiyono Yasuno, Nozomi Nishida, Nao Tōyama, Junna	
O C T O B E R	8	Dakaichi: Spain Arc	Naoyuki Tatsuwa	Hiroki Takahashi, Yūki Ono, Takuya Satō, Yuma Uchida, Kohsuke Toriumi, Wataru Hatano	
O C T O B E R	8	Child of Kamiari Month	Takana Shirai	Aju Makita, Maaya Sakamoto, Miyu Irino, Riko Nagase, Chafurin, Wataru Takagi, Ko Shibasaki, Arata Iura	
O C T O B E R	15	Daughter of Lupin	Hideki Takeuchi	Kyoko Fukada, Kōji Seto, Kanna Hashimoto, Louis Kurihara, Maju Osawa	
O C T O B E R	15	Baragaki: Unbroken Samurai	Masato Harada	Junichi Okada, Kō Shibasaki, Ryohei Suzuki, Ryosuke Yamada, Hideaki Itō, Yuki Yamada	
O C T O B E R	22	Cube	Yasuhiko Shimizu	Masaki Suda, Anne Watanabe, Masaki Okada, Hikaru Tashiro, Takumi Saito, Kotaro Yoshida	
O C T O B E R	22	Unlock Your Heart	Rin Shuto	Anna Yamada, Ryuto Sakuma, Haruka Imou, Hiroshi Yamamoto, Aoba Kawai, Akari Kinoshita, Yuka Itaya, Misako Tanaka, Masato Hagiwara	
O C T O B E R	29	And So the Baton Is Passed	Tetsu Maeda	Mei Nagano, Kei Tanaka, Satomi Ishihara, Kenshi Okada, Kurumi Inagaki, Aya Asahina, Yuko Ando	
O C T O B E R	29	Sing a Bit of Harmony	Yasuhiro Yoshiura	Tao Tsuchiya, Haruka Fukuhara, Asuka Kudoh, Kazuyuki Okitsu, Mikako Komatsu, Satoshi Hino	
O C T O B E R	30	What Happened to Our Nest Eggs?!	Tetsu Maeda	Yūki Amami, Yutaka Matsushige, Yua Shinkawa, Toshiki Seto, Mitsuko Kusabue	
O C T O B E R	30	Sword Art Online Progressive: Aria of a Starless Night	Ayako Kawano	Yoshitsugu Matsuoka, Haruka Tomatsu, Inori Minase, Hiroaki Hirata, Hiroki Yasumoto, Rina Hidaka	
N O V E M B E R	3	What Did You Eat Yesterday?	Kazuhito Nakae	Hidetoshi Nishijima, Seiyō Uchino, Koji Yamamoto, Hayato Isomura	
N O V E M B E R	12	The Lone Ume Tree	Kotaro Wajima	Mariko Kaga, Muga Tsukaji, Ikkei Watanabe, Yoko Moriguchi, Taiyo Saito, Hayashiya Shōzō IX, Reiko Takashima	
N O V E M B E R	12	Parasite in Love	Kensaku Kakimoto	Nana Komatsu, Kento Hayashi, Arata Iura, Ryo Ishibashi	
N O V E M B E R	12	Summer Ghost	Loundraw	Chiaki Kobayashi, Miyuri Shimabukuro, Nobunaga Shimazaki, Rina Kawaei	
N O V E M B E R	12	Kaizoku Sentai: Ten Gokaiger	Shojiro Nakazawa	Ryota Ozawa, Yuki Yamada, Mao Ichimichi, Kazuki Shimizu, Yui Koike, Junya Ikeda	
N O V E M B E R	19	The Mole Song: Final	Takashi Miike, Shinsuke Sato	Toma Ikuta, Ryohei Suzuki, Takashi Okamura, Nanao, Karen Takizawa, Mitsuru Fukikoshi, Kenichi Endō, Sarutoki Minagawa	
N O V E M B E R	19	Sanctuary X	Yu Irie	Masaki Okada, Haruna Kawaguchi, Kiyohiko Shibukawa, Maho Yamada, Sho Yakumaru	
N O V E M B E R	26	Eureka: Psalm of Planets Eureka Seven: Hi-Evolution	Tomoki Kyoda, Hisatoshi Shimizu	Kaori Nazuka, Rina Endō, Ami Koshimizu, Toshiyuki Morikawa, Michiko Neya, Mamoru Miyano	
N O V E M B E R	26	Chain	Yoshiho Fukuoka	Shusaku Kamikawa, Kenji Shio, Takanori Murai, Misa Wada, Nagiko Tsuji, Shiori Doi	
N O V E M B E R	26	See Your Curtain Goes Down	Seira Maeda	Rena Matsui, Miwako Kakei, Harumi Shuhama, Nanami Hidaka, Manami Enosawa, Kenta Kiguchi	
N O V E M B E R	26	Arashi Anniversary Tour 5×20 Film: Record of Memories	Yukihiko Tsutsumi	Masaki Aiba, Jun Matsumoto, Kazunari Ninomiya, Satoshi Ohno, Sho Sakurai	
D E C E M B E R	3	Hula Fulla Dance	Seiji Mizushima, Shinya Watada	Haruka Fukuhara, Dean Fujioka, Yūki Yamada, Karen Miyama, Miu Tomita, Kaori Maeda	
D E C E M B E R	3	Mankai Movie A3!	Kenji Kurata	Ryugi Yokota, Takahashi Ryoya, Yuki Maeda, Toshiki Ishi, Yamato Furutani, Sho Jinnai	
D E C E M B E R	3	What She Likes...	Shogo Kusano	Fuju Kamio, Anna Yamada, Oshiro Maeda, Ryota Miura	
D E C E M B E R	9	Asakusa Kid	Hitori Gekidan	Yūya Yagira, Yo Oizumi, Honami Suzuki, Mugi Kadowaki, Hiroyuki Onoue, Morio Kazama	
D E C E M B E R	10	Your Turn to Kill: The Movie	Noriyoshi Sakuma	Tomoyo Harada, Kei Tanaka, Nanase Nishino, Ryusei Yokohama, Tetsushi Tanaka, Naoto Takenaka, Tae Kimura	
D E C E M B E R	10	Battleship Boys	Yuki Saito	Kanta Sato, Masaya Kato, Mayu Yamakura, Tatsuomi Hamada, Reiya Masaki, Wataru Ichinose	
D E C E M B E R	17	Wheel of Fortune and Fantasy	Ryusuke Hamaguchi	Kotone Furukawa, Kiyohiko Shibukawa, Fusako Urabe	
D E C E M B E R	17	Kamen Rider: Beyond Generations	Takayuki Shibasaki	Kentaro Maeda, Subaru Kimura, Syuichiro Naito, Wataru Hyuga, Takaya Yamaguchi, Ayaka Imoto, Ryo Aoki, Noritaka Hamao, Junya Komatsu, Miku Itō, Akiyoshi Nakao, Yui Asakura, Kurodo Hachijoin, Ken Shonozaki, Mei Angela, Rina Chinen	
D E C E M B E R	17	Struggling Man	Toshio Lee	Ken Yasuda, Eiko Koike, Yui Okada	
D E C E M B E R	24	Jujutsu Kaisen 0	Sunghoo Park	Megumi Ogata, Mikako Komatsu, Kōki Uchiyama, Tomokazu Seki, Yuichi Nakamura, Takahiro Sakurai	
D E C E M B E R	31	99.9 Criminal Lawyer: The Movie	Hisashi Kimura	Jun Matsumoto, Teruyuki Kagawa, Hana Sugisaki	
D E C E M B E R	31	The End of the Pale Hour	Hana Matsumoto	Takumi Kitamura, Yuina Kuroshima, Yuki Inoue, Takashi Yamanaka, Raiku, Ken Sugawara, Aimi Satsukawa, Hitomi Takahashi	

=== Delayed or postponed ===
Below is a list of films delayed or postponed due to the COVID-19 pandemic in Japan.

Status	Title	Director	Cast	Original release date	New release date or action taken	Ref(s)
P O S T P O N E D	The Fable: The Killer Who Doesn't Kill	Kan Eguchi	Junichi Okada, Fumino Kimura, Yurina Hirate, Shinichi Tsutsumi, Mizuki Yamamoto, Masanobu Ando, Jun Kurose, Yoshi Inoshita	February 5, 2021	June 16, 2021	
P O S T P O N E D	The Door into Summer	Takahiro Miki	Kento Yamazaki, Kaya Kiyohara, Naohito Fujiki, Natsuna, Hidekazu Mashima, Rin Takanashi	February 19, 2021	June 25, 2021	
P O S T P O N E D	Doraemon: Nobita's Little Star Wars 2021	Shin Yamaguchi	Wasabi Mizuta, Megumi Ōhara, Yumi Kakazu, Tomokazu Seki, Subaru Kimura	March 5, 2021	March 11, 2022	
P O S T P O N E D	It's a Flickering Life	Yoji Yamada	Kenji Sawada, Masaki Suda, Mei Nagano, Nobuko Miyamoto, Yojiro Noda, Nenji Kobayashi, Shinobu Terajima, Keiko Kitagawa, Lily Franky, Jun Shison, Oshiro Maeda	December 2020 (first time); April 16, 2021 (second time)	August 6, 2021	
P O S T P O N E D	Crayon Shin-chan: Shrouded in Mystery! The Flowers of Tenkasu Academy	Wataru Takahashi	Yumiko Kobayashi, Miki Narahashi, Toshiyuki Morikawa, Satomi Kōrogi	April 23, 2021	July 30, 2021	
P O S T P O N E D	Earwig and the Witch	Gorō Miyazaki	Kokoro Hirasawa, Shinobu Terajima, Etsushi Toyokawa, Gaku Hamada, Sherina Munaf, Yuji Ueda	April 29, 2021	August 25, 2021	
P O S T P O N E D	Remain in Twilight	Daigo Matsui	Ryo Narita, Kengo Kora, Ryuya Wakaba, Kisetsu Fujiwara, Kenta Hamano, Rikki Metsugi, Atsuko Maeda, Yu Shirota, Marie Iitoyo, Rio Uchida, Kika Kobayashi	April 29, 2021	May 12, 2021	
P O S T P O N E D	Gekijouban Police × Heroine Lovepatrina!: ~Kaitou kara no Chousen!, Rabu de patto Taihoseyo!~	Takashi Miike	Miyu Watanabe, Rina Yamaguchi, Yui Yamashita, Yūra Sugiura, Minami Hishida, Kira Yamaguchi, Toa Harada, Ran Ishii, Keiji Kuroki, Saeko Kamijō, Seishiro Kato, Shingo Yanagisawa	April 29, 2021	May 21, 2021	
P O S T P O N E D	Kakegurui – Compulsive Gambler Part 2	Tsutomu Hanabusa	Minami Hamabe, Mahiro Takasugi, Aoi Morikawa, Ruka Matsuda, Yūma Yamoto, Taishi Nakagawa, Natsumi Okamoto, Miki Yanagi, Sayuri Matsumura, Elaiza Ikeda, Ryusei Fujii	April 29, 2021	June 1, 2021	
P O S T P O N E D	Jump!! The Heroes Behind the Gold	Ken Iizuka	Kei Tanaka, Tao Tsuchiya, Yūki Yamada, Gordon Maeda, Atsushi Maeda, Nao Kosaka, Motoki Ochiai, Takayuki Hamatsu	June 19, 2020 (first time); May 7, 2021 (second time)	June 18, 2021	
P O S T P O N E D	Knights of Sidonia: Ai Tsumugu Hoshi	Hiroyuki Seshita, Tadahiro Yoshihira	Ryōta Ōsaka, Aya Suzaki, Aki Toyosaki, Hisako Kanemoto, Takahiro Sakurai, Ayane Sakura, Eri Kitamura, Sayaka Ohara	May 14, 2021	June 4, 2021	
P O S T P O N E D	Mobile Suit Gundam: Hathaway's Flash	Shūkō Murase	Kenshō Ono, Reina Ueda, Junichi Suwabe, Soma Saito, Kenjiro Tsuda, Yui Ishikawa	July 23, 2020 (first time); May 21, 2021 (second time)	June 11, 2021	
P O S T P O N E D	A Croco Who Will Die in 100 Days	Shinichiro Ueda, Miyuki Fukuda	Ryūnosuke Kamiki, Tomoya Nakamura, Subaru Kimura, Yuko Araki	May 28, 2021	July 9, 2021	
P O S T P O N E D	The Deer King	Masashi Ando, Masayuki Miyaji	Shinichi Tsutsumi, Ryoma Takeuchi, Anne Watanabe, Hisui Kimura, Yoshito Yasuhara, Toaru Sakurai	September 18, 2020 (first time); September 10, 2021 (second time)	February 4, 2022	
P O S T P O N E D	The Pass: Last Days of the Samurai	Takashi Koizumi	Kōji Yakusho, Takako Matsu, Kyōko Kagawa, Min Tanaka, Tatsuya Nakadai, Kento Nagayama, Kyoko Yoshine, Ryota Bando, Masahiro Higashide	July 1, 2021	June 17, 2022	
P O S T P O N E D	Inu-Oh	Masaaki Yuasa	Avu-chan, Mirai Moriyama, Tasuku Emoto, Kenjiro Tsuda, Yutaka Matsushige	September 9, 2021 (78th VFF)	May 28, 2022	
P O S T P O N E D	Riverside Mukolitta	Naoko Ogigami	Kenichi Matsuyama, Tsuyoshi Muro, Hidetaka Yoshioka, Hikari Mitsushima	November 5, 2021	September 16, 2022	
P O S T P O N E D	Truth	Yukihiko Tsutsumi	Kotoha Hiroyama, Ayano Fukumiya, Tomomi Kono	2021	January 7, 2022	
P O S T P O N E D	Shin Ultraman	Shinji Higuchi	Takumi Saitoh, Masami Nagasawa, Hidetoshi Nishijima, Daiki Arioka, Akari Hayami, Tetsushi Tanaka	Summer 2021	May 13, 2022	

== See also ==
- List of 2021 box office number-one films in Japan
- 2021 in Japan
- 2021 in Japanese television
