= Daigoro vs. Goliath =

- Theatrical release poster
- Directed by: Toshihiro Iijima
- Screenplay by: Kitao Senzoku
- Produced by: Hajime Tsuburaya; Kazuho Mitsuta
- Starring: Hiroshi Inuzuka; Shinsuke Minami; Hachiro Misumi; Masao Komatsu
- Cinematography: Yuzo Inagaki
- Music by: Toru Fuyuki
- Production companies: Tsuburaya Productions; Toho
- Distributed by: Toho
- Release date: 17 December 1972 (Japan)
- Running time: 84 minutes
- Country: Japan
- Language: Japanese

Daigoro vs. Goliath (怪獣大奮戦 ダイゴロウ対ゴリアス, Kaijū Daifunsen Daigorō tai Goriasu; lit. Great Monster Battle: Daigoro vs. Goliath) is a 1972 Japanese tokusatsu kaiju film directed and written by Toshihiro Iijima, with special effects by Jun Oki and Minoru Nakano. Co-produced by Tsuburaya Productions and Toho Studios, the film stars Hiroshi Inuzuka and Akiji Kobayashi.

== Plot ==
Daigoro is a monster who was orphaned after the military used intercontinental missiles to kill his mother while she tried to protect him. Only one man stood against that decision. He pitied the infant, and took it as his own and raised him in Japan. But Daigoro grew too large and too expensive to feed. The man made Daigoro an icon for a business. Elsewhere Goliath, a monster who had been trapped in an asteroid for a long time, went to Earth and battled Daigoro. Goliath eventually defeated Daigoro by striking him with lightning from his horn. Goliath then left to pillage the world, leaving Daigoro to die. Daigoro recovered and practiced daily for his next battle against Goliath. After an intense fight, Daigoro breathed his fire ray and managed to defeat Goliath. The humans then grabbed Goliath while he was still weak and strapped him to a rocket and launched him into space.

== Cast ==
- Shinsuke Minami as Goro Kizawa
- Kazuya Kosaka as Saito
- Hachiro Misumi as Goro Hachi
- Akiji Kobayashi as Hitoshi Suzuki
- Hiroshi Inuzuka as Ojisan
- Tetsuo Yamamura as Daigoro / Daigoro's mother
- Hisashi Kato as Goliath

== Production ==
Daigoro vs. Goliath was made to celebrate the 10th anniversary of Tsuburaya Productions. Tsubaraya initially wanted to produce a historical drama to celebrate their 10th anniversary, but due to budget limitations and the excessive bureaucracy that would've been involved it was instead decided to produce a kaiju film Due to his experience directing other Tsuburaya Productions such as Ultra Q and Ultraman, Toshihiro Iijima was selected as director and would also write the screenplay under the pseudonym Kitao Senzoku (his second writing effort under the name after an episode of Return of Ultraman).

Former staffs from Daiei Film, which was declared bankrupt in the previous year, participated in the productions of both Daigoro vs. Goliath and Fireman (1973), and these productions utilized Daiei Tokyo Studio and practical effects and explosives from the Gamera series.

== Release ==
Daigoro vs. Goliath was released in Japan on 17 December 1972 where it was distributed by Toho.

== Follow-up production ==
After Daigoro vs. Goliath proved a commercial success, producer Noboru Tsuburaya made a deal with Toho to license Godzilla for a children's monster film recycling assets from Daigoro vs. Goliath which itself was reverse engineered from a Godzilla pitch rejected in favor of Godzilla vs. Hedorah. The film was to be titled Godzilla vs. Redmoon and came close to starting production with Shohei Tôjô as director and special effects by Kazuo Sagawa until ultimately being cancelled for unknown reasons.

== Legacy ==
While the production of Daigoro vs. Goliath was influenced by Daiei Film and its Gamera franchise, the "Konaka Gamera", one of the original scripts of the 1995 film Gamera: Guardian of the Universe by Chiaki and Kazuya Konaka (the other was by Yoshikazu Okada, was influenced by Daigoro vs. Goliath. These scrapped scripts were later redeveloped into Gamera the Brave (2006) and Gamera Rebirth (2023), Ultraman Tiga (1996) by Tsuburaya Productions, and Digimon Tamers (2001) by Toei Animation. Chiaki Konaka's fondness of Ultraman productions since his childhood has influenced his creativity, and he additionally cited Tsuburaya Production's Kaiju Booska (and Ultra Q) and Future Boy Conan by Hayao Miyazaki for the production of the Digimon anime, along with referring to Kanegon the Ultra-kaiju in the novel Digimon Tamers 1984.
