= Kaiju Booska =

- Title card
- Genre: Tokusatsu; Sitcom; Kaiju
- Created by: Tsuburaya Productions
- Developed by: Masahiro Yamada; Shozo Uehara
- Directed by: Jukichi Takemae
- Starring: Kazue Takahashi; Haruyoshi Nakamura
- Composer: Kunio Miyauchi
- Country of origin: Japan
- No. of episodes: 47

Production
- Running time: 24 minutes

Original release
- Network: Nippon TV (Japan)
- Release: November 9, 1966 – September 27, 1967

Kaiju Booska (快獣ブースカ, Kaijū Būsuka; lit. Cheerful Beast Booska) is a family tokusatsu television series, and the first to feature the friendly monster Booska. Produced by Tsuburaya Productions, the show aired on Nippon TV from November 9, 1966 to September 27, 1967, with a total of 47 episodes. There was a Booska revival in Japan from 1998 to 2000, when a new season of Booska was released called "Booska! Booska!" (in English).

== Character ==
Booska is the name of a cute, friendly, human-sized kaiju that looks like a cross between a bucktoothed teddy bear and a giraffe. It was originally an iguana until its owner and mega-genius, Daisuke Tonda, fed it experimental powder called "kuropara" meant to grow the creature into a giant dinosaur-like monster that Daisuke could control. Booska himself appeared wearing a "Boo Crown" which is made from the element Booskanium, appearing as three golden horns running from front to back down his head. This is the source of all his magical abilities, as well as his intelligence, so if he loses the crown he loses his abilities as well. By using his Boo Crown, Booska can fly, lift up to 100 tons, or even turn invisible, among a number of other powers including shooting lasers and extending and retracting its tail. The crown itself is temperature-sensitive, so if it warms up his powers and intelligence strengthen, and if it is cooled they weaken. He can also change his size, appearing initially as about a foot tall in episode 1, but switching between that size and the height of an adult human (1.8 m) weighing 120 kg. Booska needs to be wearing his Boo Crown for his superpowers to work, and his Boo Crown requires nourishment, especially ramen, in order to function properly. In addition, after a turtle bites his tail in the first episode, Booska becomes terrified of turtles, which his enemies use to their advantage.

Booska has a brother, Chamergon, who Daisuke agrees to create after Booska reveals that he feels lonely. Daisuke plans on using the same kuropara powder that he used to create Booska on a squirrel, though this plan goes awry when a space alien crashes into the reaction. As a result, Chamergon is part squirrel, and part space alien, and thus can survive without oxygen. Chamergon has superpowers as well, including an ability to shoot lasers from his tail, super-speed, and the ability to shape-shift through use of a walnut. He is originally Booska's nemesis, but he learns to be better with time, eventually turning into a friend (though never quite losing his tricksy habits).

== Production ==
Kaiju Booska was originally planned to feature a monster resembling Godzilla. In the spring of 1966, Eiji Tsuburaya was pitched by employee Toshiaki Ichikawa, which would be in the style of fantasy-comedy series such as Obake no Q-Tarō. Tsubaraya would approve, and Ichikawa would hire manga artist Katsumi Masumi, who had previously worked on the similar strip Peke the Friendly Beast (Kaiju Peke). Production of the black and white series would start in June of that year.

== Reception and legacy ==
The series would become popular with children upon its release in September 1967. The Booska character would later be revived by Tsuburaya Productions in the series Booska! Booska! (Buusuka! Buusuka!), which ran on TV Tokyo from 1999 to 2000. The character would make other appearances in the Ultraman franchise such as the 2001 film Ultraman Dyna: Return of Hanejiro

The writer Chiaki Konaka lists Kaiju Booska, which he noted influences from Ultra Q, as one of references for his Digimon anime Digimon Tamers (2001) along with Hayao Miyazaki's Future Boy Conan (1978); Ultraman productions were one of materials that shaped Konaka's creativity since his childhood, and one of the original scripts for Gamera: Guardian of the Universe (1995) by Chiaki and his brother Kazuya. Their scrapped Gamera script was influenced by Tsuburaya's Daigoro vs. Goliath (1972), which itself was influenced by Showa Gamera films, and the it was eventually reused for Gamera the Brave (2006) and Gamera Rebirth (2023), Ultraman Tiga (1996), and Digimon Tamers. Konaka additionally cited Kanegon the kaiju in the novel Digimon Tamers 1984, a spinoff prequel of the Digimon anime.

== Home media ==
On April 25, 2001 Video Maker released a box-set titled Kaiju Booska DVD Memorial BOX and on March 22, 2013 and released a box-set titled Kaiju Booska COMPLETE DVD-BOX.
