= Yū Sugimoto =

Japanese voice actress (born 1975)

- 杉本 ゆう
- Born: January 29, 1975 (age 51); Suita, Osaka, Japan
- Occupation: Voice actress
- Years active: 1996–present
- Agent: Haikyō
- Website: Official profile

Yū Sugimoto (杉本 ゆう, Sugimoto Yū; born January 29, 1975 in Suita, Osaka, Japan) is a Japanese voice actress.

== Filmography ==
=== Television animation ===
Year	Title	Roles	Note
1996–present	Detective Conan	Yumi Miyamoto, Cleaning Female Crew (Ep. 214)	
1996–2004	KochiKame: Tokyo Beat Cops	Rika Saotome	
1999–2000	Digimon Adventure	Gotsumon	
2000	Hamtaro	Maidō-kun, Neteru	
2002	RahXephon	Elvy Hadhiyat	
2002	Saikano	Akemi	
2002–2003	Kiddy Grade	Female Teacher, Director, Middle-Aged Woman	
2005–2006	Onegai My Melody	Mana Fujisaki, Queen Elephant	
2006–2021	Gintama	Catherine	
2009–2010	Kimi ni Todoke	Yuka	
2011–2011	Kimi ni Todoke 2nd Season	Yuka	
2016	Watashi ga Motete Dousunda	Mitsuko Serinuma	

=== Theatrical animation ===
Year	Title	Roles	Note
2008	Resident Evil: Degeneration	Ingrid Hunnigan	
2012	Resident Evil: Damnation	Ingrid Hunnigan	
2013	Lupin the 3rd vs. Detective Conan: The Movie	Yumi Miyamoto	
2021	Detective Conan: The Scarlet Bullet	Yumi Miyamoto	

=== Video games ===
Year	Title	Roles	Note
1999	Tokyo Wakusei Planetokio	Iken	PS1 ver.
2001	Eithea	Namuria Ruz Gi	[アイシア] - PS1 ver.
2003	RahXephon: Soukyuu Gensoukyoku	Elvy Hadhiyat	PS2 ver.
2010	FINAL FANTASY XIV	Matoya, Meriel, Vidofnir, Moenbryda	PC ver.
2012	Resident Evil 6	Ingrid Hunnigan	
2019	Chocobo's Mystery Dungeon EVERY BUDDY!	Stella	Nintendo Switch, PlayStation 4
2023	Resident Evil 4	Ingrid Hunnigan	

=== Voice Dubbing ===
Year	Title	Roles	Note
1998	All I Wanna Do	Monica Keena as Tinka Parker	Origin Title: Strike!, The Harry Bird
2002	John Q	Martha Chaves as Rosa Gonzales	
2004–2006	Alias	Mía Maestro as Nadia Santos	
2004–2010	Lost	Michelle Rodriguez as Ana Lucia Cortez	
2005	Stuck on You	Eva Mendes as April Mercedes	
2006	Today You Die	Mari Morrow as Jada	
2007	The Hitcher	Sophia Bush as Grace Andrews	
2007	The Simpsons Movie	Milhouse Van Houten	Theatrical Ver.
2008	Deception	Natasha Henstridge as Simone Wilkinson	Wall Street Analyst (Jonathan's first encounter)
2008–2014	Star Wars: The Clone Wars	TJ-912	S3,E12- Nightsisters/S4,E4- Shadow Warrior
2009	Avatar	Michelle Rodriguez as Trudy Chacon	
2009	A Perfect Getaway	Marley Shelton as Cleo	
2012	Skyfall	Naomie Harris as Eve Moneypenny	
2015	Spectre	Naomie Harris as Eve Moneypenny	
2016–2019	Divorce	Molly Shannon as Diane	
2020	The Twilight Zone	DeWanda Wise as Alexa Brandt	
2021	No Time to Die	Naomie Harris as Eve Moneypenny	
2022	The 355	Lupita Nyong'o as Khadijah Adiyeme	
