= Toshiro Kandagawa =

Japanese chef (1939–2021)

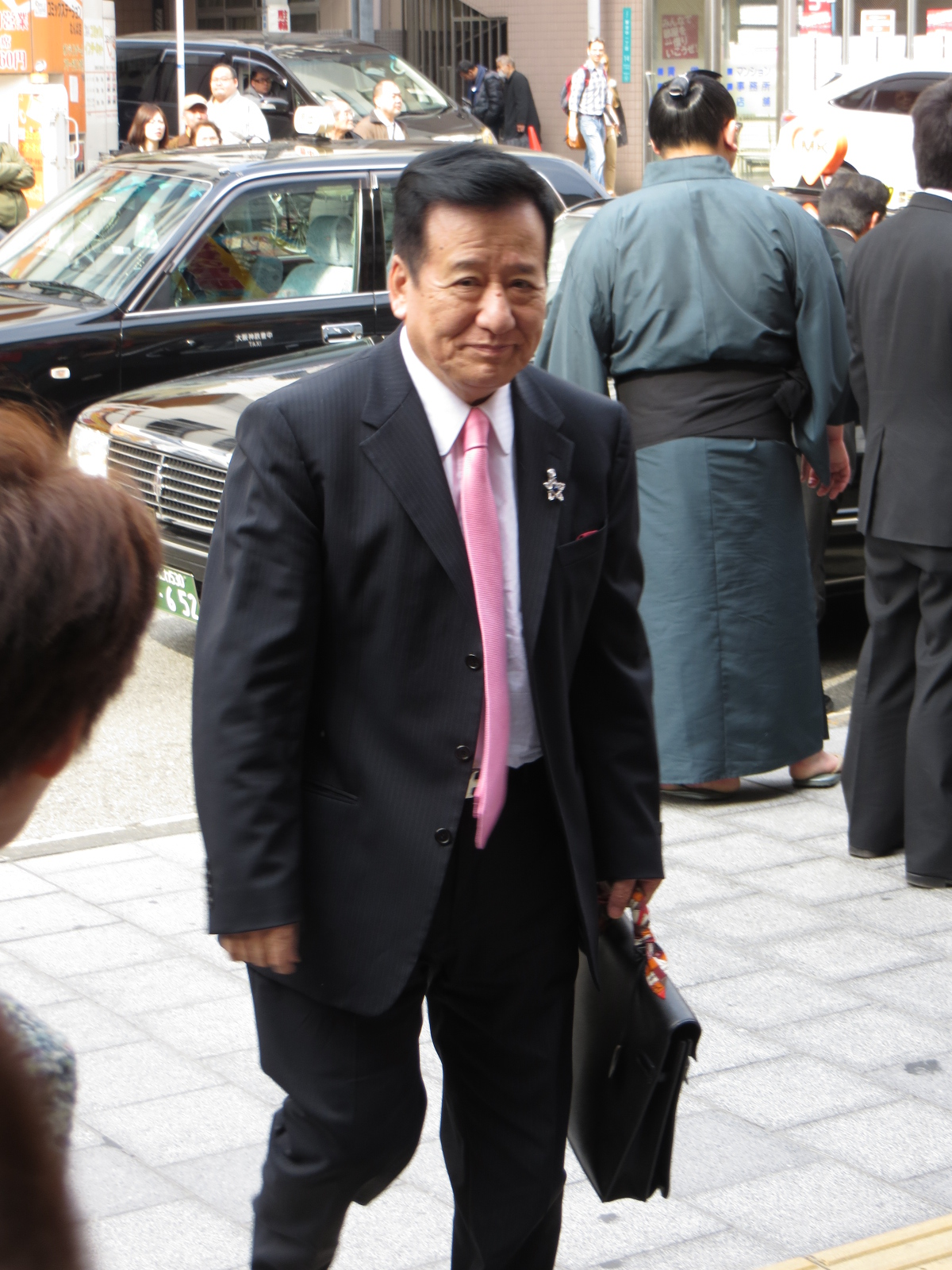
- Kandagawa in 2013
- Born: November 15, 1939; Kyoto, Japan
- Died: April 25, 2021 (aged 81); Osaka, Japan
- Occupation: Chef

Toshiro Kandagawa (神田川俊郎, Kandagawa Toshirō; November 15, 1939 – April 25, 2021) was a Japanese chef, known primarily for his strict following of classic Japanese cooking styles.

== Career ==
Kandagawa entered the cooking profession at the age of 16 when he was hired on as an apprentice cook at the restaurant Nadaman (なだ万) in Osaka. At 22, he left to continue his career at Fukuyanagi (ふく柳). In 1965, he opened his own restaurant, Kandagawa (神田川」) also in Osaka.

== Iron Chef ==
Kandagawa is undoubtedly best known to American audiences from his involvement with the cult-hit Iron Chef. As a leader of a large faction of chefs who believe in the purity of traditional Japanese cuisine, he rarely entered Kitchen Stadium without a large entourage of other chefs, and often supported apprentices in their challenges of the Iron Chefs. His role in Iron Chef's storylines was the same as a heel in the world of professional wrestling, an aggressive and somewhat bullying persona for the Iron Chefs to contend with. He personally battled the Iron Chefs on several occasions, winning 3 of his 5 battles. (His first victory was over Iron Chef Chen Kenichi, and his second was against Iron Chef Koumei Nakamura, who in a storyline point had vowed to retire as an Iron Chef if he lost. True to his word, Nakamura's next battle was his last as a regular Iron Chef.)

In addition to the battles, Kandagawa was also upon occasion a special guest of Kitchen Stadium in various episodes. He attended the retirement episodes of both Nakamura and Rokusaburo Michiba, who had battled many of Kandagawa's protégés. He also acted as a consultant to master chef Tadamichi Ohta and the "Ohta faction" of Japanese cuisine specialists, who were the primary nemesis of the third Iron Chef Japanese, Masaharu Morimoto. His final appearance in the regular series was during the "King of Iron Chefs" tournament final, where he sat alongside the other Iron Chefs as they watched the final battle between Hiroyuki Sakai and Chen Kenichi.

Kandagawa's final Iron Chef battle took place during the 21st Century Battles special, when he sported a shaven head as proof of his resolution to bring Japanese cuisine into the new millennium. He defeated Iron Chef Hiroyuki Sakai in this battle, which was one of the few that Sakai lost where seafood was the main ingredient.

He was also known for his short temper onscreen and his playfulness toward the camera as shown during his battle with Iron Chef Sakai during their Lotus Root Battle.

One notable moment was when one of the judges, French actress Julie Dreyfus, refused to eat the dish prepared by him because it contained whale meat.

Kandagawa died from COVID-19 on April 25, 2021, in Osaka, during the COVID-19 pandemic in Japan. He was 81.
