= My Hero Academia: World Heroes' Mission =

2021 Japanese animated film by Kenji Nagasaki

- Theatrical release poster
- Kanji: 僕のヒーローアカデミア THE MOVIE ワールド ヒーローズ ミッション
- Revised Hepburn: Boku no Hīrō Akademia za Mūbī: Wārudo Hīrōzu Misshon
- Directed by: Kenji Nagasaki
- Screenplay by: Yōsuke Kuroda
- Based on: My Hero Academia by Kōhei Horikoshi
- Produced by: Sokichi Onoda; Mirei Tsumura; Hiroya Nakata; Kazumasa Sanjouba; Mari Furubayashi; Hayato Saga
- Starring: Daiki Yamashita; Nobuhiko Okamoto; Yuki Kaji
- Cinematography: Mayuko Furumoto
- Edited by: Kumiko Sakamoto
- Music by: Yuki Hayashi
- Production company: Bones
- Distributed by: Toho
- Release date: August 6, 2021 (Japan)
- Running time: 105 minutes
- Country: Japan
- Language: Japanese
- Box office: US$47.03 million

My Hero Academia: World Heroes' Mission (Japanese: 僕のヒーローアカデミア THE MOVIE ワールド ヒーローズ ミッション, Hepburn: Boku no Hīrō Akademia za Mūbī: Wārudo Hīrōzu Misshon) is a 2021 Japanese animated superhero film based on an original story featuring the characters of My Hero Academia manga series by Kōhei Horikoshi. Produced by Bones and distributed by Toho, the third film of the franchise is directed by Kenji Nagasaki from a script written by Yōsuke Kuroda and stars Daiki Yamashita, Nobuhiko Okamoto, and Yuki Kaji as part of an ensemble cast. In the film, taking place during the Endeavor Agency arc of the manga, Izuku Midoriya and his classmates join the Pro-Heroes around the world for a mission to stop a terrorist plan that will bring an end to humanity.

A third film was initially teased in November 2020 with a key visual featuring Midoriya, Katsuki Bakugo, and Shoto Todoroki. One week after it was first announced, the film was officially confirmed for a 2021 release. Its full title was revealed in March 2021 along with the announcement of the release date. Horikoshi was credited for the original story in the film and the original characters' designs.

The film premiered in Japan on August 6, 2021, and was released in the United States and Canada on October 29. It received generally positive reviews from critics, who praised the animation and plot but criticized the character development. The film grossed over $47 million worldwide and received a nomination at the Newtype Anime Awards. A fourth film, titled My Hero Academia: You're Next, was released in Japan on August 2, 2024.

== Plot ==
A doomsday cult known as Humarise believes that Quirks will eventually become so powerful that they will bring about the extinction of humanity. Because of this, they have planted bombs all over the world filled with "Trigger" gas which kills Quirk users by driving their Quirks out of control and dying in the process. Their leader, Flect Turn, plans to use these bombs to save humanity by killing the Quirk population.

After Humarise detonates its first Trigger Bomb, the World Heroes Association dispatches Pro Heroes and U.A. High Hero Course students to Humarise's targets in hopes of disarming the remaining bombs. Izuku Midoriya, Katsuki Bakugo, and Shoto Todoroki are among those sent to Humarise's supposed main headquarters in the country of Otheon. None of the Heroes find any trace of Humarise and they are put on standby. During an outing, Izuku, Katsuki, and Shoto encounter a jewel robbery in progress. Shoto and Katsuki pursue the thieves while Izuku gives chase to their courier Rody Soul, a street urchin who took the job to provide for his younger siblings.

Meanwhile, Alan Kay, a Humarise scientist, flees with an important briefcase but is attacked by a Humarise agent, Beros, and he crashes his car in the midst of Izuku and Rody's chase. Rody accidentally grabs Kay's briefcase shortly before Izuku catches him. They are soon attacked by the police, but Izuku escapes with Rody using Blackwhip. Izuku is publicly accused of mass murder by Otheon's chief of police, who is a member of Humarise, and goes off the grid per Shoto's advice. Izuku and Rody make their way to the neighboring country of Klayd, where the Otheon police will not have jurisdiction. Izuku sends a coded message about his new destination to Shoto, who heads off with Katsuki to join him there.

That night, Rody becomes homesick and secretly reports the briefcase to the police. The officers that arrive turn out to be Humarise agents, who attack him. Having been woken up by Rody's bird companion Pino, Izuku saves him, but is wounded by Beros during the fight. Rody apologizes to Izuku while patching him up, explaining how his father abandoned the family to join Humarise, and that he and his siblings were ostracized as a result. The two are attacked at the Klayd border by Beros, but are saved by Katsuki and Shoto, while Beros commits suicide in order to evade capture.

Later, Izuku discovers a hidden compartment in the briefcase containing a puzzle which Rody played with as a kid. Rody solves it and finds a USB device and a data disk inside. The disk contains a message from Kay, who reveals that he and Eddie Soul, Rody's father, were forced by Humarise to create the Trigger bombs; the device contains a kill code for the bombs created by Kay and Eddie. Humarise announces that they will detonate their remaining bombs in two hours, forcing the deployed Heroes to scramble in defense to find them and fight the Humarise soldiers. Izuku and the others head to Humarise's headquarters with the device on a plane piloted by Rody.

Katsuki and Shoto deal with high-ranking Humarise villains, while Izuku faces Flect Turn, whose Quirk reflects whatever comes into contact with him. Izuku is overwhelmed by Flect Turn's natural defenses, as well as his laser barrage. Rody arrives and seemingly betrays Izuku by handing over the device in exchange for his siblings' safety. Thanks to Pino, who is actually Rody's sentient Quirk which expresses his true feelings and intentions, Izuku realizes it is a feint and catches Flect Turn off guard. Realizing that Flect Turn's Quirk has a limit to how much damage it can take, Izuku uses One For All at 100%, to defeat Flect Turn with a barrage of attacks.

Meanwhile, Rody heads for the Trigger Bombs' control system, and despite being wounded by the laser defense system, he and Pino barely manage to insert the device in time, preventing the Bombs from activating. In the aftermath, Humarise's surviving members are arrested, while the Heroes are healed at the hospital. As Izuku heads back to Japan, he and Rody bid a tearful goodbye to each other. Class 1-A reunites back at U.A., while Rody gets a job at the local bar, and also pursues his dream of becoming a pilot.

== Voice cast ==
Character	Japanese	English
Izuku Midoriya / Deku	Daiki Yamashita	Justin Briner
Katsuki Bakugo / Dynamight	Nobuhiko Okamoto	Clifford Chapin
Shoto Todoroki / Shoto	Yuki Kaji	David Matranga
Toshinori Yagi / All Might	Kenta Miyake	Christopher Sabat
Enji Todoroki / Endeavor	Tetsu Inada	Patrick Seitz
Keigo Takami / Hawks	Yuichi Nakamura	Zeno Robinson
Ochaco Uraraka / Uravity	Ayane Sakura	Luci Christian
Momo Yaoyorozu / Creati	Marina Inoue	Colleen Clinkenbeard
Minoru Mineta / Grape Juice	Ryō Hirohashi	Brina Palencia
Tsuyu Asui / Froppy	Aoi Yūki	Monica Rial
Kyoka Jiro / Earphone Jack	Kei Shindō	Trina Nishimura
Eijiro Kirishima / Red Riot	Toshiki Masuda	Justin Cook
Denki Kaminari / Chargebolt	Tasuku Hatanaka	Kyle Phillips
Fumikage Tokoyami / Tsukuyomi	Yoshimasa Hosoya	Jessie James Grelle
Mezo Shoji / Tentacole	Masakazu Nishida	Ian Sinclair
Hanta Sero / Cellophane	Kiyotaka Furushima	Christopher Bevins
Tetsutetsu Tetsutetsu / Real Steel	Koji Okino	David Wald
Tamaki Amajiki / Suneater	Yūto Uemura	Aaron Dismuke
Nejire Hado / Nejire-chan	Kiyono Yasuno	Lindsay Seidel
Hizashi Yamada / Present Mic	Hiroyuki Yoshino	Dave Trosko
Claire Voyance	Yōko Honna	Sarah Roach
Yu Takeyama / Mt. Lady	Kaori Nazuka	Jamie Marchi
Ryuko Tatsuma / Ryukyu	Kaori Yagi	Katelyn Barr
Shinji Nishiya / Kamui Woods	Masamichi Kitada	Aaron Roberts
Taishiro Toyomitsu / Fat Gum	Kazuyuki Okitsu	Kyle Hebert
Ken Ishiyama / Cementoss	Kenta Ōkuma	Chris Rager
Kugo Sakamata / Gang Orca	Shuhei Matsuda	Tyler Walker
Moe Kamiji / Burnin	Misato Kawauchi	Lisa Ortiz
Salaam	Takuma Miyazono	Frank Todaro
WHA Director	Kiyomitsu Mizuuchi	Jeremy Schwartz
Alan Kay	Hirofumi Nojima	Brent Mukai
Beros	Mariya Ise	Michelle Rojas
Serpenters	Junya Enoki	Mike Haimoto
Sidero	Yūichirō Umehara	D. C. Douglas
Leviathan	Shogo Sakata	Marcus D. Stimac
Rogone	Yuuki Hayashi	Jason Douglas
Roro Soul	Naomi Ōzora	Michelle Rojas
Lala Soul	Hina Natsume	Emi Lo
Otheon Police commissioner	Toshitsugu Takashina	Bruce Carey
Eddie Soul	Toshihiko Seki	Ivan Jasso
Pino	Megumi Hayashibara	Cristina Vee
Flect Turn	Kazuya Nakai	Robbie Daymond
Rody Soul	Ryo Yoshizawa Asisa Sekine (young)	Ryan Colt Levy Cristina Vee (young)

== Production ==
Before the release of My Hero Academia: Heroes Rising in December 2019, My Hero Academia manga creator Kōhei Horikoshi stated in July that "[probably] there won't be a third film", believing that the second film of the franchise was the "kind of finale for My Hero Academia. That is because its story uses one of the concepts [I] had wanted to use in the manga's final battle." In November 2020, each of the official Twitter accounts for My Hero Academia manga, anime series, and films posted tweets that could be combined to form the sentence "He will meet the three musketeers". Each tweet had links that would lead to images of Katsuki Bakugo, Izuku Midoriya, and Shoto Todoroki which could be combined to form a teaser visual for the third film of the franchise. After a week, the latest issue of Weekly Shōnen Jump magazine officially confirmed the film for a summer release.

In March 2021, the title of the film was revealed as My Hero Academia the Movie: World Heroes' Mission, which would be based on an original story, with Horikoshi serving as its chief supervisor and the original character designer. Additionally, Kenji Nagasaki was also revealed to be directing the film at Bones along with Yousuke Kuroda as the screenwriter and Yoshihiko Umakoshi as the character designer. The designs for "stealth suit" outfits of Midoriya, Bakugo, and Todoroki in the film were revealed in May 2021.

Ryo Yoshizawa joined the cast of the film as the original character named Rody Soul in May 2021, as did Kazuya Nakai and Megumi Hayashibara in June as the leader of an organization that threatens the world named Flect Turn and the trusted partner of Rody named Pino, respectively. Additional cast for the film were revealed in July 2021, including Mariya Ise as Beros, Junya Enoki as Sir Pentas, Yūichirō Umehara as Shidero, Shogo Sakata as Leviathan, Hirofumi Nojima as Allen Kay, and Yōko Honna as Claire Voyance.

== Music ==
Yuki Hayashi was revealed to be composing My Hero Academia: World Heroes' Mission in March 2021, after previously doing so for My Hero Academia anime series and the franchise's films My Hero Academia: Two Heroes (2018) and Heroes Rising. In June 2021, Asian Kung-Fu Generation was revealed to be performing the theme music for the film titled "Empathy" (エンパシー). The following month, the 35th issue of Weekly Shōnen Jump magazine revealed the insert song in the film titled "Flowers" (フラワーズ), also performed by the same band. The film's original soundtrack was released in Japan by Toho Animation Records and in the United States by Milan Records on August 6, 2021.

Milan Records released the soundtrack on vinyl records in the United States in July 2022. That month, Anime Limited announced the release of the soundtrack on vinyl records in the United Kingdom and Ireland. Selected tracks from the soundtrack were remastered and included in the album My Hero Academia (Soundtrack Selection 2021–2023), which was released digitally in March 2023.

== Marketing ==
A teaser trailer and the key visual drawn by Umakoshi for My Hero Academia: World Heroes' Mission were released in March 2021. A new visual for the film was released in June 2021. A bonus manga by Horikoshi titled My Hero Academia Vol. World Heroes was given to the first one million people who viewed the film in theaters in Japan. It was also given to the moviegoers who saw the film in theaters in the United States. A novel based on the film written by Anri Yoshi was published in Japan by Shueisha on August 6, 2021.

Promotional partners for the film included the sushi restaurant chain Kura Sushi; Tsutaya, which released their membership card T Card with designs based on Midoriya, Bakugo, and Todoroki; the bento take-out chain Hokka Hokka Tei; the steakhouse Ikinari Steak; the variety store Thank You Mart; the karaoke brand Joysound; and Good Smile Company, which released Nendoroids of Midoriya, Bakugo, and Todoroki wearing their stealth suits in the film.

== Release ==
=== Theatrical ===
My Hero Academia: World Heroes' Mission was released in Japan on August 6, 2021, and received 4D screenings on August 28. The film held its American premiere at the Animation Is Film Festival in Los Angeles' TCL Chinese Theatre on October 24, 2021. It was released in Australia and New Zealand on October 28, 2021. The film was screened in the United States and Canada by Funimation, and in the United Kingdom and Ireland by Sony Pictures Releasing International on October 29, 2021.

=== Home media ===
My Hero Academia: World Heroes' Mission was released on Blu-ray and DVD in Japan on February 16, 2022. The "Plus Ultra" edition contains an original video animation titled "Departure" (旅立ち, Tabidachi), which is based on the chapter "No.XXX Hawks: SOOTHE" from Vol. World Heroes manga, and follows Midoriya, Bakugo, and Todoroki as they encounter Hawks in an airport terminal.

Crunchyroll released the film on Blu-ray and DVD in the United States and Canada on August 23, 2022, and in the United Kingdom and Ireland by Funimation on September 26. They released it along with Two Heroes and Heroes Rising on Blu-ray and DVD in a single pack, collectively titled My Hero Academia: 3-Movie Collection, in the United Kingdom on February 6, 2023. The film was added to the streaming service on November 20, 2026.

== Reception ==
=== Box office ===
My Hero Academia: World Heroes' Mission grossed $29.3 million in Japan and $17.8 million in other territories, for a worldwide total of $47.03 million. It is the tenth highest-grossing domestic film of 2021 in Japan.

The film earned $2.81 million on its opening day in Japan, 229.2% more than My Hero Academia: Heroes Rising (2019) did on its premiere. In its opening weekend, the film earned $8.51 million, ranking second behind F9 (2021). The film reached the one-billion-yen mark in its second weekend and grossed ¥2.07 billion ($18.82 million) in its third weekend, becoming the highest-grossing film of the franchise. It placed first in its fourth weekend, fourth in its fifth weekend, and first again in its sixth weekend. The film reached the three-billion-yen mark in its seventh weekend, with its ranking dropping to sixth. It rose to fifth in its eighth weekend with $398,500, but it fell to eighth in its ninth weekend after earning $288,600 and dropped out of the ranking in its tenth weekend after earning $228,300.

Outside Japan, the film earned $6.4 million in its opening weekend in the United States and Canada, placing fourth behind No Time to Die (2021). In Australia, the film grossed $169,268 in its opening weekend, ranking fifth at the box office. In the United Kingdom and Ireland, the film made $293,000 from 260 theaters.

=== Critical response ===
On the review aggregator website Rotten Tomatoes, the film holds an approval rating of 87% based on 30 reviews, with an average rating of 7.1/10. The website's critics consensus reads, "Fun for newcomers and existing fans alike, My Hero Academia: World Heroes' Mission is an entertaining interlude between seasons of the series." On Metacritic, the film has a weighted average score of 51 out of 100 based on 4 critic reviews, indicating "mixed or average reviews". Cinema Today reported that the film's audience had more females than the targeted male demographic, comprising 76.5%.

Rafael Motamayor gave My Hero Academia: World Heroes' Mission 8 out of 10 for IGN, praising its visuals that "out-Marvels the [Marvel Cinematic Universe]" and the villains' motives that he noted were inspired by the graphic novel X-Men: God Loves, Man Kills. He felt that the film "captures the heart of early Stan Lee and Steve Ditko Spider-Man comics", particularly the "grounded approach" to Deku with his newfound power and its "sheer optimism in the face of great stakes". Hayes Madsen of ComingSoon.net also gave the film 8 out of 10, noting the "bigger emphasis on exaggerated expressions for characters and action scenes". He praised its "sense of scale and gravitas that the past two films simply didn't have" due to the expanding world of the franchise but felt that the villain's development was "lacking".

Richard Eisenbeis of Anime News Network graded the film "C+", praising its animation and plot hook while criticizing the characters and their development. Writing for /Film, Caroline Cao felt that the film was "solid enough in its watchability, crowdpleasing action, sight gags, and core relationship" but criticized its lack of scope. Despite noting Deku's shiny relationship with Rody, she found the film did "little overtly novel with Deku's drive to become a Hero".

Maya Phillips of The New York Times was critical of the film, particularly its "rapid cuts and camera shifts [that] makes it dizzying to witness", the characters being ignored "for the sake of a formulaic plot and forgettable antagonist", and the final fight she described as "long and... perfunctory". She felt that the film was a "missable third film" of the franchise and had "little to offer veteran fans of the series or new viewers". Richard Whittaker of The Austin Chronicle gave the film two out of five stars, stating that it "never quite balances the darkness with the inherent plucky optimism and sporadic goofiness that makes the series so popular". He felt that World Heroes Mission would work better if it was a television series rather than a film "since the last 40 minutes is one big punch-a-thon, with most of the supporting cast yet again busy offscreen".

=== Accolades ===
In December 2021, My Hero Academia: World Heroes' Mission was among the Top 100 Favorites nominated for the Anime of the Year at the Tokyo Anime Award Festival 2022. In October 2022, the film was nominated for Best Picture (Film) Award at the Newtype Anime Awards. In December 2022, the film was placed first on U-NEXT's "The Best 10 Most Popular Works in 2022" list for Anime Rental category.

== Sequel ==
A fourth anime film, titled My Hero Academia: You're Next, premiered in Japan on August 2, 2024. Tensai Okamura serves as the director, Kuroda writing the script, Umakoshi designing the characters, and Horikoshi serving as its general supervisor and original character designer.
