= Toshihiro Iijima =

Japanese director, producer and screenwriter (1932–2021)

- 飯島 敏宏
- Iijima in 2017
- Born: September 3, 1932; Tokyo, Japan
- Died: October 17, 2021 (aged 89)
- Occupations: Director, producer, screenwriter
- Years active: 1957–2011
- Known for: Ultraman
- Notable work: Ultra Q Ultraman; Ultraseven; Return of Ultraman; Daigoro vs. Goliath; Ultraman Cosmos: The First Contact

Toshihiro Iijima (Japanese: 飯島 敏宏, Hepburn: Toshihiro Iijima; September 3, 1932 – October 17, 2021), also known by the names Kitao Senzoku (千束 北男, Senzoku Kitao), and Jōtarō Jitōin (持統院丈太郎, Jitōin Jōtarō), was a Japanese film and television director, producer, and screenwriter.

== Early life ==
Iijima was born on September 3, 1932, in Tokyo Prefecture. After graduating from Tokyo Metropolitan Koishikawa Secondary Education School, he entered the Faculty of Letters at Keio University because he was interested in the playwright Michio Kato. At that time, Kato was teaching at the Department of Japanese Literature, Faculty of Letters at the university, but committed suicide the next year. He chose the Department of English because he could no longer see the point of entering the Department of Japanese Literature.

== Filmography ==
=== Director ===
- Ultra Q (1966)
- Ultraman (1966)
- Return of Ultraman (1971)
- Daigoro vs. Goliath (1972)
- Ultraman Cosmos: The First Contact (2001)
- Homecoming (2011)

=== Producer ===
- My Son! My Son! (1979)
- 24 Eyes (1987)

=== Screenwriter ===
- Daigoro vs. Goliath (1972) [as Kitao Senzoku]
- Ultraman Cosmos: The First Contact (2001) [as Kitao Senzoku]
- Homecoming (2011) [as Kitao Senzoku]
