= Case Closed: The Scarlet Bullet =

- Theatrical release poster
- Japanese: 名探偵コナン 緋色の弾丸
- Directed by: Chika Nagaoka
- Written by: Takeharu Sakurai
- Based on: Case Closed by Gosho Aoyama
- Starring: Minami Takayama; Kappei Yamaguchi; Rikiya Koyama; Wakana Yamazaki; Megumi Hayashibara; Shūichi Ikeda; Ryōtarō Okiayu; Noriko Hidaka; Toshiyuki Morikawa; Atsuko Tanaka; Yu Sugimoto; Minami Hamabe; Aya Hirano; Kenichi Suzumura; Miyuki Ichijo; Takaya Hashi; Kiyoyuki Yanada; Taiten Kusunoki; Charles Glover
- Cinematography: Hitoshi Nishiyama
- Music by: Katsuo Ono; Tokyo Jihen (Theme Song: "Eien no Fuzai Shoumei")
- Production company: TMS/V1 Studio
- Distributed by: Toho
- Release date: April 16, 2021
- Running time: 110 minutes
- Country: Japan
- Language: Japanese
- Box office: $102.5 million

Case Closed: The Scarlet Bullet, known in Japan as Detective Conan: The Scarlet Bullet (Japanese: 名探偵コナン 緋色の弾丸, romanized: Meitantei Konan Hiiro no Dangan), is a 2021 Japanese animated mystery film directed by Chika Nagaoka. It is the twenty-fourth installment of the Case Closed film series based on the manga series of the same name by Gosho Aoyama, following the 2019 film The Fist of Blue Sapphire. This is the first Reiwa-era Case Closed movie.

Detective Conan: The Scarlet Bullet was released in Japan on April 16, 2021. Its release was delayed from an original April 2020 date due to the COVID-19 pandemic. A global release was announced on February 9, 2021, featuring a multi-language trailer in Japanese, English, Korean, German, and Chinese. The Scarlet Bullet is listed as 2021's second highest-grossing Japanese film worldwide, below Jujutsu Kaisen 0.

== Plot ==
15 years before the events of the movie, during the World Sports Games (WSG) in Boston, a series of kidnappings occur. The victims were the heads of companies that sponsored the WSG. The first victim was the CEO of a confectionery company, the second victim was the CEO of a big conglomerate group, and the third and final victim was the CEO of an automobile company. The first two victims were later released unharmed, however, the third victim, Morgan Tracy, managed to escape, but was chased down by the kidnapper and shot dead as he attempted to escape via the Detroit People Mover.

In the present day, Conan, Anita, the Detective Boys and Rachel attend an event where the Hyper Linear, a vacuum superconducting train capable of reaching 1000km/hr, is revealed. The train will make its first trip on the day of the Tokyo WSG Opening Ceremony, and will start its journey from Nagoya Airport to the terminal station which is connected to the stadium where the Opening Ceremony is taking place. Alan McKenzie, President of the WSG Committee and a former FBI Director, together with all the sponsors and committee members for the Tokyo WSG, will be taking the Hyper Linear on its maiden trip. It is announced that there will be a balloting contest to allow lucky members of the public to join in the maiden trip.

The Detective Boys want to take the Hyper Linear. Since Serena's father, Samuel Sebastian, is a sponsor for the WSG, the kids beg Serena to pull some strings and get them the ticket. As the dinner buffet is served, there is a sudden blackout. Conan sees a mysterious flash of light in the darkness. After the lights come back on, Serena's father, Samuel, is missing. The guests are all sent to their hotel rooms while Meguire and his team investigate the disappearance. Thanks to George and his keen scent of smell for eels, the Detective Boys realize the culprit knocked Samuel unconscious and took him away with a food cart. George uses his smell to lead the Detective Boys into the kitchen, where they find Samuel tied up and locked in one of its cabinets.

The police interview Samuel. Here, it is revealed that sometime ago, one of Samuel's friends, who was the CEO of a Japanese confectionery company, had been kidnapped in the midst of a golf game. She was later found tied up in the toilet, but unharmed. They suspect the two cases are linked.

Serena and Rachel visit the Detective Boys at Agasa's house. Serena gives the Detective Boys Kamen Yaiba goodies as a token of thanks for finding her father. She has also managed to secure tickets for the Hyper Linear's maiden trip, but she only managed to get 6, whereas there are 7 of them total (Conan, Anita, the 3 Detective Boys, Rachel and Serena). Agasa says he wants to be counted too but is sadly denied. To settle who are the 6 that gets to ride, Agasa sets a quiz. All of them answered correctly, with Sonoko being the last, but she deliberately did not answer to give the kids the chance. The Detective Boys are excited for the ride. Conan, however, is concerned about the kidnappings.

Subaru receives a call from the FBI. The FBI has realised that the two kidnappings are very similar to the one that happened in Boston 15 years ago and are worried that someone may be replicating the crime. Hence, they are interested to investigate. Subaru meets with Conan and the two have a talk regarding the recent cases. They realize from the pattern that the next victim is likely to be the CEO of an automobile company.

Rachel returns home and sees John Voit, a British National who is also an automobile company CEO, leaving Richard's agency. During dinner, Richard gets worked up when he learns that Conan, Rachel and the Detective Boys are going to board the Hyper Linear. He reveals that John Voit is aware he may be the culprit's next victim, and that the culprit may strike during the Hyper Linear's first trip. Hence, he hired Richard to help protect him and find the culprit. Conan and Rachel, fearing that something bad may happen during the trip, realize they need to find a way to make sure the Detective Boys do not get onto the train. Meanwhile, Mary has also managed to get tickets for the train, but Masumi says that Rachel and Conan will also be on the train, so she will go to Nagoya but have to do it secretly.

Conan, Anita, Rachel and the Detective Boys attend a briefing for those selected to attend the Hyper Linear's first trip. In charge of the briefing are Maiko Shirahato from WSG public relations, Osamu Inoue who is the train's chief engineer and Ellie Ishioka who claims to be the idol of the Hyper Linear crew. The briefing introduces some of the key details of the train, ending with Ellie accidentally revealing that WSG President Alan McKenzie has fitted a giant flag (made up of all the different countries' flags) into the train and plans for it to be flown when the train reaches the stadium as a surprise.

To put the Detective Boys out of harm's way, Conan and Rachel decide to give them tickets to a Kamen Yaiba show instead, happening the same time as the train's trip and near the WSG Stadium. The Detective Boys are excited and forget about the train trip. In the meantime, Shukichi and Yumi go on a date in Nagoya, where Shukichi intends to meet Mary and introduce Yumi to her, but Mary is ignoring his calls. Yumi gets terribly drunk. She says in public that she accepts Shukichi's proposal while in a drunk state.

On the day of the maiden trip, Richard is at the Nagoya Airport where the trip begins as he has to protect John Voit. He is shocked and mad when he sees Rachel, who insists on joining in to help. The two of them are shocked when Conan and Anita also join in. The Detective Boys meanwhile are at the Kamen Yaiba show enjoying themselves, with Serena forced to babysit them.

As the guests make their way to the train, Conan and Subaru discuss their plans over the phone. Alan McKenzie arrives and joins the other guests. They are all subjected to a medical check-up to ensure their body is fit for the journey due to the extreme speed of the train. During the checkup process, an explosion occurs and gas starts to fill up the room. Anita realizes the gases are a quenching agent, which will knock them unconscious and kill them after prolonged exposure. Conan, Anita, Rachel and Richard, along with the other guests, all faint from the exposure.

The incident draws the attention of the local police, who deploys almost their entire fleet to attend to the situation. As Rachel, Richard and Conan wake up, they realize that John Voit has disappeared, which means the culprit likely has got him. Conan has slipped a GPS tracking device onto John Voit earlier, and uses his glasses to determine the culprit is on the move. He leaves to chase down the culprit.

Subaru, who has been waiting in the airport's carpark, also gives chase when Conan gives him the location. As Subaru is about to leave, his Ford Mustang nearly crashes into Mary and Masumi's bike. Subaru drives off to chase the culprit. Masumi also saw the culprit leave, and they also gave chase. However, halfway through the chase, Mary orders Masumi to go after Subaru's Mustang instead.

Conan's glasses are damaged and lose signal because he fell earlier when he lost consciousness. Anita helps him to navigate through a phone call using her backup glasses. She joins the investigators who discover the explosion was caused by the culprit jamming a bed into an MRI machine. They discover that the air vents have been tampered with, to make sure that the quenching agent would mostly be directed into the check-up room where everyone is in, but the culprit later redirected the vents to expel the agent out of the building before anyone gets killed. At the same time, due to the incidents, the Hyper Linear will still continue its trip as planned, but without passengers. All the guests will return to Tokyo on the Shinkansen. As they prepare to board the Shinkansen, Alan McKenzie is reported missing.

Subaru follows John Voit's GPS signal to an abandoned warehouse. Before he can find the culprit, Mary and Masumi arrive. Masumi fights Subaru but realizes she cannot beat him. Mary joins in and they take him down, grazing his mask. The culprit's car then dashes out of the darkness and escapes again. Before anything can happen, Conan arrives. Masumi goes to talk to Conan, Subaru uses this chance to run off and chase after the culprit in his car. Mary goes into hiding, telling Masumi she cannot meet Conan just yet.

Conan gets onto Masumi's bike and they continue tracking John Voit's GPS signal. They eventually find him tied up but unharmed on an overhead bridge. They call in the police to escort John to safety. When the police come and reveal that most of the officers were deployed to deal with the airport incident, Conan has a big realization and discovers what the culprit is up to. He calls Subaru and they put their plans into action. Subaru rips off his mask, finally showing Akai. Akai drives off, he goes to a section of the Hyper Linear's track. He gets onto the track, takes aim of his bolt action rifle, and fires a single bullet, then leaves. He tells Conan the rest is up to him.

Conan and Masumi go to the Nagoya Station, where the press and crowd is counting down to the Hyper Linear's launch. Conan creates a distraction with his exploding football and he sneaks onto the Hyper Linear with Masumi. They deduce that since the 3rd victim from the case 15 years ago was killed on a train platform, the culprit intends to repeat the same thing on the Hyper Linear.

On the Shinkansen, Inoue and Ishioka are showing the guests live footage of the Hyper Linear. Rachel is shocked when she sees Conan and Masumi on the Hyper Linear through Inuoe's tablet. Conan calls Anita, while searching through the Hyper Linear with Masumi for signs of Alan and the culprit. Following a trail of vitamins left by Alan, Conan and Masumi find him locked inside a suitcase in a control compartment. They free Alan, Anita then uses her badge to let all the passengers on the Shinkansen listen in as Conan exposes the culprit, with help from Shinichi as he claims.

Jodie makes a phone call to all passengers on the Hyper Linear's maiden trip list, which Conan had given her earlier. All the passengers' phones are ringing, except for one, Maiko Shirahato, who comes into the cabin where Conan is on the Hyper Linear through a door. Her phone did not ring as it was damaged when it was exposed to radiation when she damaged the MRI back at the airport. Shirahato holds Alan at gunpoint, she reveals that her father, Makoto Ishihara, was wrongfully convicted for the Boston case. She had told the FBI that she was with her father when one of the kidnappings occurred, providing an alibi but they did not believe her. Her father died later in prison, while her mother died from grief after returning to Japan. She wants Alan to pay the price with his life, Alan does not resist. However, he tells her that due to the high speed of the train, she will have to shoot him from further away, from a top-down angle, into his heart, so as to prevent the bullet from shooting through him and causing potential severe damage to the train, which in this case would potentially kill Conan and Masumi, which Shirahato has no intention of doing. As Shirahato listens to Alan guiding her to stand at a suitable position (Alan was a marksmanship WSG champion), the Hyper Linear encounters slight turbulence as it enters a tunnel, causing everyone to lose their balance. Conan tries unsuccessfully to disarm Shirahato with his wristwatch stun gun, but as Shirahato is about to shoot Alan, a bullet flies in from behind and struck Shirahato on her right shoulder, knocking her out.

Conan requests the train be stopped at the nearest station and the police and ambulance be called, especially with Shirahato wounded. As the nearest station is the terminal at the WSG stadium, they have no choice but to wait till the train reaches its destination.

As Rachel, Richard and the passengers on the Shinkansen are relieve that the case is closed, Conan reveals that there is another culprit, Osamu Inoue. They had realized during their earlier struggle with Shirahato that someone was remotely controlling the Hyper Linear when they saw the gears shifting. Inoue, being the chief engineer of the train, would have access to these controls. Moreover, Shirahato alone would not have the strength to move two big men inside suitcases, hence she must have the help of a male accomplice. Richard and Rachel restrain Inoue, while Anita checks his tablet which confirms he had been controlling the Hyper Linear.

With the culprits exposed, Masumi is curious how Conan managed to get so much help. While they are chatting, Conan receives a call from Rachel on his Shinichi's smartphone, which Masumi immediately notices. Before she can question Conan further, on the Shinkansen, Inoue breaks free from Richard with his taser, beats Anita up and runs off with his tablet when the train reaches a station. Richard gives chase.

After fleeing from Richard, Inoue activates his back up plan, using his tablet to set off a series of explosions on the Hyper Linear, damaging its system critically (causing the train to be unable to slow down and stop as it reaches its destination) and releasing a quenching agent into the cabin. James Black, Andre Camel and Jodie Starling catch up to Inoue's Audi TT RS, but he drives off when he sees their car approaching.

Akai runs into Shukichi and Yumi by coincidence when Yumi dashes in front of his car in her drunken state. Shukichi, with his genius level intellect, guides Akai, Camel and Jodie on a strategic chase route which ends in Inoue's car flipping over and exploding when he is stopped by Jodie. Inoue reveals to Jodie that he hates the FBI, he is the son of one of the victims from the Boston case. After the kidnappings, the sponsors all pulled out support to the WSG, and were shamed in the eyes of the public. When he found out that Shirahato had a shared hatred for the FBI, they got together and worked their way into the WSG committee, to get revenge on the former FBI Director and now WSG President Alan. Jodie and James reveal that Shirahato was wrong in claiming the FBI wrongly accused her father, as an accomplice had actually confessed to James that her father was involved. Inoue breaks down. The FBI leaves him to be arrested by the Japanese police.

On the Hyper Linear, Conan and Masumi follow instructions from Rachel, Anita and Ellie on possible ways to stop the train. They go to the train's control room, in hopes of stopping the train with the brake, but it is not responding. Fearing the worst, the authorities evacuate the fully packed WSG stadium and call off the Opening Ceremony.

The Detective Boys and Serena finish the Kamen Yaiba show and meet up with Agasa. They excitedly call Rachel to speak to Anita and Conan, oblivious to the danger Conan is currently in. However, when they told Rachel and Anita about how Kamen Yaiba flew onto the stage with a parachute during the show, Rachel and Anita a discover a way to stop the Hyper Linear – the giant flag Alan has fitted onto the train.

They relay the message to Conan and Masumi, who put the plan into action. Masumi goes to the back of the Hyper Linear where the flag is, while Conan stays at the front. As the train nears the terminal, Conan signals Masumi to release the flag, which acts as a resistant force slowing the train down. Conan, meanwhile, blows up a hole to the front of the train with his football and inflates a giant football from his belt to reduce the impact before running back into the cabin, exclaiming that no way will he die in this manner. The Hyper Linear derails, with parts of it crashing into the stadium while some flips over on the track. Rachel and Anita watch in horror from the Shinkansen, fearing the worst.

As the dust settles, they see Conan, Masumi, Alan and Shirahato strapped onto seats, injured and bleeding but alive. The police and paramedics arrive in the aftermath. Shirahato is arrested and taken to the hospital. Conan and Rachel reunite happily. Masumi shares her admiration for Conan.

It is revealed that Akai had requested from Camel that a special bullet be made for him, a silver bullet, which was the bullet he shot and the same one that took down Shirahato. The bullet needed to be specially made to ensure that it would be able to penetrate the Hyper Linear's body safely taking into account its speed and material. Conan had sent a message to Alan, asking him to direct Shirahato into a position such that the bullet will hit her, but at a non-fatal spot. Hence, the odd scene where Alan guides Shirahato on how to safely kill him. Akai tells his colleagues how he admires Conan, who would solve cases without endangering the lives of even the culprit. Whereas the FBI was ready to kill the culprit if necessary, something Jodie told Conan in an earlier conversation.

Akai parks his car in a parking lot, with Shukichi and Yumi sleeping together at the back. He asks Andre to send them home safely, and gets back into his Subaru disguise. Going back to his own car, Subaru is confronted by Mary who is hiding in the back seat, pointing a gun into his head. Mary says he is lucky nothing happened to the British VIP, and calls him "FBI kid" before disappearing. Subaru smirks at Mary calling him FBI kid. Shukichi and Yumi are home, Yumi now sober. She denies having accepted Shukichi's proposal, much to his disappointment.

== Cast ==
Character	Japanese voice actor	English voice actor
Conan Edogawa	Minami Takayama	Wendee Lee
Ran Mōri	Wakana Yamazaki	Cristina Vee
Kogorō Mōri	Rikiya Koyama	Xander Mobus
Shinichi Kudō	Kappei Yamaguchi	Griffin Burns
Hiroshi Agasa	Kenichi Ogata	Michael Sorich
Ai Haibara	Megumi Hayashibara	Erica Mendez
Ayumi Yoshida	Yukiko Iwai	Janice Kawaye
Mitsuhiko Tsuburaya	Ikue Ōtani	Erika Harlacher
Genta Kojima	Wataru Takagi	Andrew Russell
Shuichi Akai	Shūichi Ikeda	Keith Silverstein
Subaru Okiya	Ryōtarō Okiayu	Jonah Scott
Masumi Sera	Noriko Hidaka	Jenny Yokobori
Shukichi Haneda	Toshiyuki Morikawa	Sean Chiplock
Mary Sera	Atsuko Tanaka	Amber Lee Connors
Yumi Miyamoto	Yu Sugimoto	AmaLee
James Black	Takaya Hashi	Jamieson Price
André Camel	Kiyoyuki Yanada	Chris Tergliafera
Jodie Starling	Miyuki Ichijo	Maureen Price
Juzo Megure	Chafurin	Jake Eberle
Miwako Sato	Atsuko Yuya	Katelyn Gault
Wataru Takagi	Wataru Takagi	Christopher Bevins
Ellie Ishioka	Minami Hamabe	Brianna Knickerbocker
Maiko Shirahato	Aya Hirano	Suzie Yeung
Osamu Inoue	Kenichi Suzumura	Brandon McInnis
John Boyd	Taiten Kusunoki and Ryan Drees (English Stunt)	Imari Williams
Alan Mackenzie	Charles Glover	

== Release ==
Case Closed: The Scarlet Bullet was released in several territories on opening day, including Hong Kong SAR, Korea, Singapore, Philippines, Brunei, Thailand, Vietnam, Germany, Switzerland, Liechtenstein, United Arab Emirates, Oman, Kuwait, Bahrain, Qatar, Saudi Arabia, Spain, and Macao.

The film was later released in other territories such as Australia, Indonesia, Malaysia, Thailand, Vietnam, France, Mainland China, New Zealand and Luxembourg.

Due to the poor performance of previous movies outside the Catalan region of Spain, this movie was not dubbed in Spanish at release, instead being played in Spanish theaters with only the subtitled Japanese dub and the Catalan dub.

The English-dubbed version of the film produced by Bang Zoom! Entertainment was scheduled to debut in the United States at Anime NYC on November 21, 2021, but was canceled. It was later rescheduled for November 18, 2023, at Anime NYC.

== Reception ==
=== Box office ===
Case Closed: The Scarlet Bullet has earned a total of $102.5 million globally. It is 2021's second highest-grossing Japanese film worldwide, below Jujutsu Kaisen 0.

==== Domestic ====
In Japan, the film sold 1,533,054 tickets in its first 3 days and earned ¥2,218,130,800 ($20.5 million), eclipsing the revenue of the previous film by 144% on first day sales alone. It ranked number 1 at the Japanese box office, beating out Evangelion: 3.0+1.0 Thrice Upon a Time and by the 15th weekend, the film earned an overall gross of 7,479,317,860 yen (about US$67.86 million). The Motion Picture Producers Association of Japan released 2021 box office rankings (for releases up until November 2021) where The Scarlet Bullet is the second highest-grossing film in Japan with a gross collection of ¥7.65 billion at the Japanese box office. The film opened with the third highest IMAX opening ever in Japan, grossing $1.2 million.

==== Foreign ====
In China, the film earned RMB 109.6 million ($16.8 million) in its first 3 days and ranked No. 1 at the Chinese box office, with a final gross of $33.6 million in China.

=== Reviews ===
The variety content website Excite, highlighted the film as positive, marking the development of the character of Shuichi Akai and his relationship with Conan, calling the relationship between the two as "trustful". The review also labelled the movie as "flashy" and highlighted the importance of minor characters, expecting that they be expanded in future films about Detective Conan.

The Yahoo! Japan review gave a mixed 3.67 out of 5 stars based on opinions from critics.

== Adaptation ==
The Scarlet Bullet will receive Manga Adaptation by Yutaka Abe and Jirō Maruden revealed in Shogakukan's Shonen Sunday S Magazine 2022 March Issue.
