= Hiromi Yamada =

Japanese chef

Hiromi Yamada (山田 宏巳, Yamada Hiromi; born January 27, 1953, in Asakusa, Tokyo) is a Japanese chef specializing in Italian cuisine. Since the 1980s, he has worked as a head chef and owner-chef at several Italian restaurants in Tokyo. In later years, restaurants associated with him have received third-party recognition in major Japanese restaurant guides.

== Early life and career ==
Yamada was born in Asakusa, Tokyo, in 1953. He entered the culinary profession as a teenager and later specialized in Italian cuisine. During the 1980s and 1990s, he worked at several Italian restaurants in Tokyo, serving as head chef at multiple establishments during a period when Italian cuisine was gaining wider recognition in Japan."山田宏巳 シェフのプロフィール". ヒトサラ (in Japanese).

== Restaurants ==
=== Basta Pasta ===
In the mid-1980s, Yamada served as head chef at Basta Pasta, an Italian restaurant located in Harajuku, Tokyo. The restaurant has been referenced in food culture publications discussing the early development of Italian cuisine in Tokyo."原宿バスタ・パスタとイタリア料理の広がり". 食べログマガジン (in Japanese).

=== Ristorante Hiro ===
In the mid-1990s, Yamada worked as head chef at Ristorante Hiro, an Italian restaurant located in Minami-Aoyama, Tokyo. The restaurant was part of the upscale Italian dining scene that emerged in Tokyo during that decade."山田宏巳のキャリアとリストランテ・ヒロ". GQ Japan (in Japanese).

=== Hirosophy ===
During the 2000s, Yamada was involved as head chef at Hirosophy, an Italian restaurant brand operating in areas such as Nishi-Azabu and Ginza, Tokyo. His work there formed part of his continued professional activity in the Tokyo restaurant industry."山田宏巳のレストラン遍歴". 食べログマガジン (in Japanese).

=== TEST KITCHEN H ===
In April 2018, Yamada opened TEST KITCHEN H, an Italian restaurant located in Minami-Aoyama, Minato, Tokyo."TEST KITCHEN H". TableCheck. The restaurant was selected for the Tabelog “Italian TOKYO Top 100 Restaurants” list in 2023 and 2025."Italian TOKYO Top 100 Restaurants 2023". Tabelog (in Japanese)."Italian TOKYO Top 100 Restaurants". Tabelog (in Japanese).

=== Infinito Hiro ===
In December 2020, Yamada opened Infinito Hiro, an Italian restaurant located in Akasaka, Minato, Tokyo, where he serves as owner-chef."インフィニート ヒロ". 食べログ (in Japanese). The restaurant was selected for the Tabelog “Italian TOKYO Top 100 Restaurants” list in 2023 and 2025."Italian TOKYO Top 100 Restaurants 2023". Tabelog (in Japanese)."Italian TOKYO Top 100 Restaurants". Tabelog (in Japanese).

== Television appearances ==
In 1994, Yamada appeared as a challenger on the Japanese television cooking program Iron Chef, where he competed against Iron Chef Chinese Chen Kenichi in a battle themed around cabbage."List of Iron Chef episodes". Wikipedia.

In 2013, he later appeared on Iron Chef in its rebooted format, returning to the Kitchen Stadium after a long absence from television cooking competitions."Iron Chef (2013) episode information". bangumi.org (in Japanese).
