= Nene Otsuka =

Japanese actress (born 1968)

- 大塚 寧々
- Born: Nene Tanabe; 14 June 1968 (age 57); Tokyo, Japan
- Occupation: Actress
- Years active: 1988–present
- Spouse: Seiichi Tanabe (m. 2002)
- Children: 1

Nene Otsuka (大塚 寧々, Ōtsuka Nene; born 14 June 1968) is a Japanese actress. She starred in Masahiro Kobayashi's film Bashing, which was screened in competition at the 2005 Cannes Film Festival.

== Career ==
Otuska has appeared in films such as Hirokazu Koreeda's I Wish and Yoshihiro Nakamura's See you tomorrow, everyone. She also appeared in Shinji Aoyama's 2002 television film Mike Yokohama: A Forest with No Name.

== Filmography ==
=== Film ===
- Quiet Days of firemen (1994)
- Hanako (1995)
- Swallowtail (1996)
- Ooi Naru Kan (1998)
- Film Noir (2000)
- The Guys from Paradise (2000)
- Man Walking on Snow (2001)
- Kikansha Sensei (2004)
- Bashing (2005)
- Female (2005)
- Limit of Love: Umizaru (2006)
- Hero (2007), Misuzu Nakamura
- Amalfi: Rewards of the Goddess (2009)
- Piecing Me Back Together (2010)
- I Wish (2011)
- It All Began When I Met You (2013)
- See You Tomorrow, Everyone (2013)
- Flight on the Water (2020)
- Daughters (2020)
- Georama Boy, Panorama Girl (2020)
- Mirai eno Katachi (2021)
- Gunkan Shōnen (2021)
- Dr. Coto's Clinic 2022 (2022), Mariko Nishiyama
- Drawing Closer (2024), Shigemi Hayasaka
- KY Rock (2024), Chieri
- Sōzoku (2025)
- Can't Cry with Your Face (2025), Nagisa Mizumura
- Kaede (2025)
- A Place Called Home (2026)

=== Television ===
- Iron Chef (1994 - Battle Beef), Guest commentator
- Hero (2001–2014), Misuzu Nakamura
- Mike Yokohama: A Forest with No Name (2002)
- Dr. Coto's Clinic (2003–2006), Mariko Nishiyama
- Team Medical Dragon (2007)
- Around 40 (2008)
- Gonzo: Densetsu no Keiji (2008)
- Tokyo Dogs (2009)
- Saigo no Yakusoku (2010)
- Detective Conan: Shinichi Kudo's Written Challenge (2011), Eri Kisaki
- Kazoku no Uta (2012)
- Last Cinderella (2013)
- Zannen na Otto (2015)
- Influence (2021)
