= Mario Frittoli =

Italian chef (born 1966)

- Born: 1 April 1966 (age 60); Pavia, Lombardia, Italy
- Education: Italian Cuisine at Locanda dell' Angelo in Sarzana
- Culinary career
- Cooking style: Italian cuisine
- Current restaurant(s): Mario i sentieri, Nishi Azabu, Tokyo
- Previous restaurant(s): Le Carpaccio Hotel Royal Monceau, France Lido and Il Forno, Santa Monica Il Forno, Roppongi, Tokyo Il Pinolo, Higashi-Azabu, Tokyo Ristorante Luxor Shirokanedai, Tokyo Ristorante Luxor Marunouchi, Tokyo
- Television shows: Iron Chef, Broccoli Battle 13 March 1998
- Website: http://mario-frittoli.com/

Mario Frittoli (born 1966) is an Italian celebrity chef at Mario i sentieri in Nishi-Azabu, Tokyo, Japan.

== Early life and education ==
Frittoli was born in Pavia, Lombardia, Italy. He studied Italian Cuisine at Locanda dell' Angelo in Sarzana, under Chef Angelo Paracucchi. Next in France, developed his skills at Le Carpaccio, a 2 Michelin stars restaurant in the Hotel Royal Monceau. In Lyon, he refined his skills under Paul Bocuse, master of French Cuisine.

== Career ==
Frittoli came to Japan in 1987, as Paul Bocuse with Angelo Paracucchi were opening restaurants in Daimaru department store in Kyoto and Shinsaibashi, Osaka. He began teaching at the Tsuji Culinary Institute in Osaka the following year. In 1989, he became Head Chef at Los Angeles celebrities' favourite "Lido", and "Il Forno" in Santa Monica with an original menu and concept that incorporated the taste of Californian Cuisine; thus proving his creativity.

In 1990, Frittoli returned to Japan for the opening of "Il Forno" in Roppongi, as Head Chef. He was subsequently assigned as the Vice President of Stillfoods assisting the opening of 28 restaurants. This led to his assignment as the Executive Chef of "Il Pinolo" in Higashi-Azabu in Tokyo. In 2008 he opened "Mario i Sentieri" in the Nishi-Azabu district in Tokyo.

1983: Chef, Hotel Villa (Lucca, Italy)

1984 – 85: Chef, Ristorante La Lanterna (Versilia, Italy)

1986–87: Chef, Paracucchi "Locanda Dell’Angelo" (Sarzano, Italy)

1988: Chef, Michelin two-starred Le Carpacio (Paris, France)

1988–89: Instructor, Daimaru (Osaka, Japan)

1989: Professor, Tsukiji Culinary Institute

1990: Chef de Partie, Paul Bocuse's Michelin three-starred L’Auberge du Pont de Collonges (Lyon, France)

1990: Restaurant development, California

1990: Opened Il Forno (Tokyo, Japan)

1994–2001: Vice President, Stillfoods (Tokyo, Japan)

• 1,000 employees

• Opened 38 restaurants, o Il Pinolo x 5, Bruschetta x 3, Mario Gelato x 30

2002: Opened Luxor Shirogane (Tokyo, Japan)

2005: Opened Luxor Marunouchi (Tokyo, Japan)

2008: Opened Mario i Sentieri (Tokyo, Japan)

2015: Mario began his relationship with OTG Management. He supervises all Italian themed restaurants throughout the eleven airports his partnered company is located in. Creating menus and curating his signature styles with passion and original ideas. )

== Television appearances ==
Mario Frittoli rocketed to even higher celebrity status with TV appearances such as the 13 March 1998 episode of Iron Chef. Mario continues to appear on TV for current popular shows such as Ōsama no Brunch on TBS, Yuhan Banzai and others.

Under independent joint management he opened restaurant "Ristorante Luxor Shirokanedai" in Tokyo.

- Traditional Italian Cuisine and one-of-a-kind style of French touch quickly grew the popularity of his borderless cosmopolitan presentation. In November 2005, they opened their 2nd restaurant "Ristorante Luxor Marunouchi".

Frittoli's international mind and character freely juggling several languages continues to build his popularity and keep him active with appearances on TV and magazines. Mario is a consultant to Nissin Foods Inc., Panorama Hospitality K.K. and Zwilling J.A. Henckels Japan Ltd. Two cookbooks have been published with clear photographs of Mario's famous dishes including "Mario's Fantastic Cooking at Home".

On 5 August 2008 the new Mario-produced owner restaurant "Mario i sentieri" opened in Nishi-Azabu, Tokyo, Japan. The restaurant is a favourite among celebrities the like of Konishiki, Musashimaru, Barbara Frittoli, Jun Hasegawa, Taro Hakase and David Coulthard

== See also ==
- Iron Chef
- List of Iron Chef episodes
