= Frittoli =

Frittoli is an Italian surname. Notable people with the surname include:

- Barbara Frittoli (born 1967), Italian operatic soprano
- Mario Frittoli (born 1966), Italian chef

== See also ==
- Frìttuli, traditional dish made of pork parts in the city of Reggio Calabria, Italy
