= Shūketsu no Sono e =

2009 single by Megumi Hayashibara

Single by Megumi Hayashibara

from the album Choice
- Language: Japanese
- B-side: "Shūketsu no Sono e" (Ayanami ver.)
- Released: April 22, 2009
- Genre: J-pop; anime song
- Length: 5:03
- Label: Starchild
- Composer: Gō Takahashi
- Lyricist: Megumi Hayashibara

Megumi Hayashibara singles chronology
"Front Breaking" (2009)	"Shūketsu no Sono e" (2009)	"Shūketsu no Unmei" (2010)

Audio
- "Shūketsu no Sono e" on YouTube

"Shūketsu no Sono e" (Japanese: 集結の園へ; lit. 'To the Garden of Gathering') is a song by Japanese singer and voice actress Megumi Hayashibara. Hayashibara wrote the lyrics under her songwriting pseudonym Megumi, while Gō Takahashi composed and arranged the music. The song served as an image song for Fields' CR Neon Genesis Evangelion: The Last Messenger, a pachinko machine based on the Neon Genesis Evangelion franchise. King Records released it as a CD single in Japan on April 22, 2009. Hayashibara initially approached the lyrics from Rei Ayanami's perspective before adopting that of Evangelion Unit 01, incorporating religious imagery and themes of human existence, spiritual convergence, and the boundaries between individuals.

Music publications praised "Shūketsu no Sono e" for its dramatic, choir-like opening, vocals, and lyrics. They also drew comparisons to "A Cruel Angel's Thesis", the opening theme of Neon Genesis Evangelion. The single peaked at number seven on the Oricon Singles Chart and remained on the chart for 24 weeks, while the Recording Industry Association of Japan (RIAJ) ultimately certified the song Double Platinum for 500,000 digital downloads. Hayashibara subsequently revisited the song through several alternate versions.

== Background and composition ==
"Shūketsu no Sono e" was written by Hayashibara under her songwriting pseudonym Megumi, while Gō Takahashi composed and arranged the music. The song served as an image song for Fields' CR Neon Genesis Evangelion: The Last Messenger, a pachinko machine based on Neon Genesis Evangelion. Hayashibara recalled that she was initially reluctant to record "Shūketsu no Sono e", as she regarded performing songs associated with Evangelion under her own name as Yōko Takahashi's domain. She accepted the project after learning that Takahashi's songs would also feature in the pachinko machine, reasoning that there might be something she herself could contribute. Hayashibara initially approached the lyrics from Rei Ayanami's perspective, but struggled to develop them. She recalled that, after changing her approach and adopting the perspective of Evangelion Unit 01, the biomechanical mecha piloted by protagonist Shinji Ikari, the words suddenly came to her. She wrote the lyrics either from Unit 01's perspective or from "a perspective looking down on the overall course of the world". She also added that the resulting lyrics expressed, with her "whole body and soul", her own experience of Evangelion.

Groovin' interpreted "Shūketsu no Sono e" as incorporating the thoughts and emotions of three key figures of Evangelion — Rei Ayanami, Yui Ikari, and Eva-01. The publication further interpreted the lyrics as expressing a maternal feeling that envelops a beloved child despite changes in form, without excessive tenderness or affection. It also noted that they incorporate the series' theme of "fusion", inviting the listener to transcend individual boundaries, become one, and move beyond feelings of hesitation. Hayashibara later explained that she incorporated a sense of Japanese religious spirituality into the song, combining church bells, temple bells, and prayers from different religions to represent "God amid chaos", which she associated with Unit 01. She associated the opening reference to a flower that eventually scatters with the Christian conception of human life ending at death, while the image of an endless dream alludes to reincarnation in Hinduism and related beliefs. She explained that the subsequent question of where "tears" return uses them to represent human life and asks whether life ultimately ends or continues. Hayashibara also said that the "garden" in the song's title evokes the Garden of Eden. CDJournal described the song as opening with a dramatic, choir-like chorus and its vocals as full of exhilaration and evoking an homage to "A Cruel Angel's Thesis".

== Release ==
King Records released "Shūketsu no Sono e" as a CD single in Japan on April 22, 2009, under the catalog number KICM-1271. The single's release was initially scheduled for March 11, 2009; however, after the rollout of CR Neon Genesis Evangelion: The Last Messenger was set for early April, King Records postponed the single's release to April 22 in conjunction with the machine's rollout. The single also includes "Shūketsu no Sono e ~Ayanami ver.~", an alternative version that Hayashibara sings in the voice of Rei Ayanami, the character she portrays in Neon Genesis Evangelion. The packaging places Hayashibara on the front cover and Rei Ayanami on the back, with the latter illustration newly drawn by Neon Genesis Evangelion character designer Yoshiyuki Sadamoto. Ahead of the physical release, the mobile service Aniuta Kakumei began distributing ringtones of "Shūketsu no Sono e" and its Ayanami version on April 6.

A remix titled "Shūketsu no Sono e ~Passion's World Mix~" appeared on the 2009 remix album Sta☆Rimi. Both the original and Ayanami versions were subsequently included on Hayashibara's 2010 studio album Choice. The original song later appeared on her 2011 greatest hits album Vintage White. Another version, titled "Shūketsu no Sono e: Second Impact", featured in the pachinko machine CR Evangelion X. It received its first CD release on Hayashibara's 2018 album Fifty~Fifty. In an interview with Music Natalie, Hayashibara recalled that the album's director had proposed opening Fifty~Fifty with "Shūketsu no Sono e: Second Impact", describing the song as impactful. She decided the remainder of the track sequence herself and grouped the album's Evangelion-related songs near the beginning. For her 2021 greatest hits album Vintage Denim, Hayashibara recorded a new version of "Shūketsu no Sono e ~Ayanami ver.~" titled "Shūketsu no Sono e ~Ayanami ver.~ float mix". The new recording was remixed to match the theme of the album's third disc.

== Promotion and live performances ==
Megumi Hayashibara first performed the full version of "Shūketsu no Sono e" on March 7, 2009, during a public recording celebrating the 900th episode of her radio program Megumi Hayashibara's Heartful Station at the Shin-Kobe Oriental Theatre. As part of the single's promotion, a truck advertising the release circulated through Tokyo's Shibuya and Shinjuku districts from April 18 to 24, 2009. It played "Shūketsu no Sono e" as it circulated and displayed illuminated advertising at night. She performed the song again on October 4, 2009, at the Tokyo Kōsei Nenkin Kaikan during a public recording marking the 900th episode of Megumi Hayashibara's Tokyo Boogie Night. The limited edition of Hayashibara's 2010 album Choice later included a digest of the event on its accompanying DVD. On June 11, 2011, Hayashibara included "Shūketsu no Sono e" in the live set for the program's 1,000th-episode public recording at Nakano Sun Plaza, performing it immediately before "Shūketsu no Sadame". On October 18, 2014, she debuted "Shūketsu no Sono e: Second Impact" live during an event celebrating the 1,200th episode of Megumi Hayashibara's Heartful Station. King Records described it as an arranged version of the original song, featuring changes to its musical development and slight alterations to the lyrics.

== Reception ==
According to the Eiga.com-operated anime news website Anime Hack, "Shūketsu no Sono e" received "high acclaim". Real Sound also credited the track with helping to heighten the excitement surrounding the CR Neon Genesis Evangelion pachinko series. The song ranked among fans' favorite songs from Evangelion and Hayashibara's discography. In its review, CDJournal wrote that the song's dramatic, choir-like opening immediately draws the listener in and that the version sung in Rei Ayanami's voice also appeals to enthusiasts. In another article, CDJournal described the song's impactful phrases as lingering in the listener's mind. Animate Times included "Shūketsu no Sono e" among its recommended songs related to Neon Genesis Evangelion and described it as exceptionally impactful. It also identified the phrase "Welcome home" (おかえりなさい, okaeri nasai) as the song's most striking passage.

== Commercial performance ==
"Shūketsu no Sono e" debuted at number eight on the Billboard Japan Top Singles Sales chart, before falling to numbers 16 and 21 over the following two weeks, and number 33 in its fourth week. It remained on the chart for 13 weeks. The single concurrently debuted at number 39 on the Billboard Japan Hot 100. On Newtype's Anime Music Download Top 10, the song ranked fifth in the magazine's July 2009 issue and fell to ninth in the August issue. It later rose to eighth in the November issue.

On the Oricon Singles Chart, "Shūketsu no Sono e" debuted at its peak of number seven for the week dated May 4, 2009, selling 14,865 copies in its first week. The single remained on the weekly chart for 24 weeks and sold 43,588 copies. It also topped Recochoku's 2009 annual Anime/Game Full ranking, which covered the period from December 1, 2008, to November 30, 2009. The Recording Industry Association of Japan (RIAJ) certified the song Gold for 100,000 downloads in May 2009. The association upgraded the song to Platinum for 250,000 downloads in June 2010 and to Double Platinum for 500,000 downloads in January 2015. In 2023, "Shūketsu no Sono e" ranked eighth among the most frequently performed songs by voice actors on Daiichikosho's DAM karaoke system, based on performances recorded from January through March.

== Track listing ==
All lyrics are written by Megumi; all music is composed by Go Takahashi.

CD single/digital release track listing
No.	Title	Length
1.	"Shūketsu no Sono e"	5:03
2.	"Shūketsu no Sono e" (Ayanami ver.)	5:30
3.	"Shūketsu no Sono e" (off vocal version)	5:03
4.	"Shūketsu no Sono e" (Ayanami ver. (off vocal version))	5:28

== Personnel ==
Credits adapted from the liner notes of the CD single.

- Megumi Hayashibara – vocals
- Gō Takahashi – arrangements
- Takahiro Shutō – guitar
- Yoshiaki Kanamori – bass
- Gen Ittetsu Strings – strings
- Keiji Kondō – recording, mixing
- Hiroyuki Tsuji – mastering
- Toshimichi Ōtsuki – executive producer

== Charts ==
=== Weekly charts ===
Weekly chart performance for "Shūketsu no Sono e" (2009)
Chart (2009)	Peak position
Japan (Oricon)	7
Japan Hot 100 (Billboard Japan)	39
Japan Top Singles Sales (Billboard Japan)	8

=== Year-end charts ===
Year-end chart performance for "Shūketsu no Sono e"
Chart (2009)	Position
Japan (Oricon)	150

== Certifications ==
Region	Certification	Certified units/sales
Japan (RIAJ) Digital	2× Platinum	500,000^{*}
^{*} Sales figures based on certification alone.
