= Kaizokuban Bootleg Film =

1999 film

- DVD cover
- Directed by: Masahiro Kobayashi
- Written by: Kobayashi Masahiro
- Produced by: Kobayashi Masahiro
- Starring: Akira Emoto; Kippei Shiina; Maika; Wakaba Nakano; Kazue Takani
- Cinematography: Akira Sakoh
- Edited by: Naoki Kaneko
- Release date: 1 December 1999 (Japan)
- Running time: 74 minutes
- Country: Japan
- Language: Japanese

Kaizokuban Bootleg Film (Japanese: 海賊版) is a 1999 Japanese drama film directed by Masahiro Kobayashi. It was screened in the Un Certain Regard section at the 1999 Cannes Film Festival.

== Cast ==
- Akira Emoto as Tatsuo
- Kippei Shiina as Seiji
- Maika as Junko
- Wakaba Nakano as Reiko
- Kazue Takani as Akiko
- Tamaki as Ayako
- Kazuki Kitamura as Yoji
