= Lear on the Shore =

- Film poster
- Directed by: Masahiro Kobayashi
- Screenplay by: Masahiro Kobayashi
- Produced by: Tomoyuki Miyagawa; Masahiro Kobayashi; Nick Uemura
- Starring: Tatsuya Nakadai; Haru Kuroki; Mieko Harada; Kaoru Kobayashi; Hiroshi Abe
- Cinematography: Chigi Kanbe; Kōichi Furuya
- Edited by: Naoki Kaneko
- Music by: Junpei Sakuma
- Distributed by: Tokyo Theatres
- Release date: June 3, 2017 (Japan)
- Running time: 105 minutes
- Country: Japan
- Language: Japanese

Lear on the Shore (Japanese: 海辺のリア, Hepburn: Umibe no Ria) is a 2017 Japanese drama/comedy film directed by Masahiro Kobayashi. The film stars Tatsuya Nakadai and, in part, reflects his own life.

== Plot ==
Chokitsu is an 84-year-old actor past his prime, who now finds himself unhappy in a luxury retirement village where he was placed by his daughter and son-in-law after the pair took his money. In an attempt to leave, while in his pajamas, he grabs his possessions and makes for the beach. He intends to regain his lost fame and seek a new audience for his talents. Plagued by dementia, he can barely remember past experiences, at times mixing up the characters he has played with his present life, and has trouble recognizing his family members. Chokitsu eventually encounters his estranged younger daughter Nobuko, but due to dementia he doesn't recognize her. She scolds him as she is his only daughter who cares for him.

== Cast ==
- Tatsuya Nakadai as Chokitsu Kuwabatake
- Haru Kuroki as Nobuko
- Mieko Harada as Yukiko
- Kaoru Kobayashi
- Hiroshi Abe as Yukio
