= See You Tomorrow, Everyone =

- Poster
- Directed by: Yoshihiro Nakamura
- Written by: Yoshihiro Nakamura
- Based on: Minasan, Sayonara by Takehiko Kubodera
- Starring: Gaku Hamada; Kana Kurashina; Kento Nagayama
- Cinematography: Gen Kobayashi
- Edited by: Toshirō Matsutake
- Production companies: Dub; Smoke
- Distributed by: Phantom Films
- Release date: January 26, 2013 (Japan)
- Running time: 120 minutes
- Country: Japan
- Language: Japanese

See You Tomorrow, Everyone (Japanese: みなさん、さようなら, Hepburn: Mina-san, sayonara) is a 2013 Japanese film directed by Yoshihiro Nakamura starring Gaku Hamada. It was released in Japan on January 26, 2013 and in the USA at the Hawaii International Film Festival on October 12, 2013.

== Plot ==
Starting in 1981, the film follows the life of Satoru Watarai (Hamada) from 12 to 30 years old. After dropping out of junior high school, Watarai has resolved never to set foot outside his danchi (Japanese apartment complex). As he watches his classmates gradually move away, he begins a daily routine of exercise, martial arts and security patrols which he believes will protect the danchi and preserve its way of life. The film also explores Watarai's struggle to build relationships, make a living and deal with the dilapidation of the complex in the wake of the collapse of Japan's bubble economy.

== Cast ==
- Gaku Hamada as Satoru Watarai
- Kana Kurashina as Saki Ogata
- Kento Nagayama as Noriaki Sonoda
- Haru as Yuri Nagashima
- Nene Otsuka as Hina Watarai

== Reception ==
In a review for the website efilmcritic.com, Jay Seaver praises Hamada's ability to reflect the character's development from a junior high school student to a 30-year-old man. This was done without the use of make-up effects.
