= Bashing (film) =

- Original Japanese release poster
- Directed by: Masahiro Kobayashi
- Written by: Masahiro Kobayashi
- Produced by: Masahiro Kobayashi; Naoko Okamura
- Starring: Fusako Urabe; Nene Otsuka; Ryūzō Tanaka; Takayuki Katō; Kikujirō Honda
- Cinematography: Kōichi Saitō
- Edited by: Naoki Kaneko
- Music by: Hiroshi Hayashi
- Production company: Monkey Town Productions
- Release dates: May 12, 2005 (France); June 3, 2006 (Japan)
- Running time: 82 minutes
- Country: Japan
- Language: Japanese

Bashing (Japanese: バッシング, Hepburn: Basshingu) is a 2005 Japanese drama film directed and written by Masahiro Kobayashi. It premiered at the 2005 Cannes Film Festival where it was nominated for the Palme d'Or. Bashing went on to win special jury award at the Fajr Film Festival and won grand prize at Tokyo FILMeX.

== Plot ==
Yuko Takai and a few other Japanese political activists in the Middle East were kidnapped and used as hostages. Upon returning to Japan, Yuko is mistreated for basically "making ripples in the water;" in other words, for not committing suicide and for making the Japanese look weak. This story is based on the real affairs of the kidnapping of three Japanese political activists by militia in Iraq in April 2004. Yuko Takai is a model of Nahoko Takato, a political activist, who was also harshly criticised by almost all Japanese.

== Cast ==
- Fusako Urabe - Yuko Takai
- Nene Otsuka - Noriko Takai, Yuko's step mother
- Ryūzō Tanaka - Koji Takai, Yuko's father
- Takayuki Katō - Ex-boyfriend
- Kikujirō Honda - Father's boss
- Teruyuki Kagawa - Hotel manager
