= Kakaku.com =

Japanese Internet service company

Kakaku.com, Inc.
- Available in: Japanese
- Traded as: TYO: 2371
- Founded: December 1997; 28 years ago
- Subsidiaries: Tabelog
- Website: kakaku.com

Kakaku.com, Inc. (株式会社カカクコム) is a Japanese company that operates Kakaku.com (from 価格) "Price.com", a comparison shopping website, and other services.

== About ==
The company was established in 1997. Kakaku.com is Japan’s largest price comparison site and one of the group companies of Digital Garage. The directors are Atsuhiro Murakami (Representative Director, President and Chief Executive Officer) and Kaoru Hayashi (Executive Chairman).

The Kakaku.com website has 52.77 million monthly users and 769.6 million monthly page views as of March 2017. The company also operates Tabelog, the largest platform for reviews of restaurants in Japan.

== Akiba Souken ==
Akiba Souken (Japanese: アキバ総研) was an anime and Akihabara culture website operated by Kakaku.com. It was established in 2002 and it closed on 30 September 2024. The site was redesigned in 2007 and 2012. It has published popularity polls for anime. As of October 2024, some of the content remained in the Internet Archive.

== See also ==
- Eiga.com - Previously owned website
