= Man Walking on Snow =

2001 film

- Japanese poster
- Directed by: Masahiro Kobayashi
- Written by: Masahiro Kobayashi
- Produced by: Masahiro Kobayashi
- Starring: Ken Ogata; Yasufumi Hayashi; Teruyuki Kagawa; Sayoko Ishii; Nene Otsuka
- Cinematography: Nobuyasu Kita
- Edited by: Naoki Kaneko
- Production company: Monkey Town Productions
- Release dates: 12 May 2001 (France); 7 September 2002 (Japan)
- Running time: 103 minutes
- Country: Japan
- Language: Japanese

Man Walking on Snow (Japanese: 歩く、人, Hepburn: Aruku, Hito) is a 2001 Japanese drama film directed by Masahiro Kobayashi. It was screened in the Un Certain Regard section at the 2001 Cannes Film Festival.

== Cast ==
- Ken Ogata as Nobuo Honma
- Yasufumi Hayashi as Yasuo
- Teruyuki Kagawa as Ryoichi
- Sayoko Ishii as Michiko (Salmon Girl)
- Nene Otsuka as Nobuko Shimizu
- Fusako Urabe as Keiko Noguchi
