= List of Iron Chef episodes =

Episodes of TV cooking competition

This is the list of episodes for the Japanese cooking television series Ryōri no Tetsujin, known among English-speaking audiences as Iron Chef, produced by Fuji Television. The series is a cooking competition in which a challenger chef "battles" one of the resident "Iron Chefs" by cooking at least one dish in a one-hour time slot based on a theme ingredient.

Not included in the lists below are two special episodes titled "Michiba Spotlight" and "Sakai and Chen Spotlight". These special episodes were made exclusively for English-speaking audiences, especially "Iron Chef fans in the States."

For consistency, all Japanese names are in Western order, macroned with Hepburn romanization. All other East Asian names, on the other hand, are in Eastern order. Also, for each of the non-Japanese East Asian challengers, as much as possible, the name used is the romanization used by either the English-dubbed version of the show or any English language publication or website. Otherwise, the romanization used for the Chinese names is derived from the Mandarin Chinese pronunciation and Pinyin romanization of the name (the episode involving the only Korean to compete in the show has already been dubbed in English).

All East Asian challengers, except those with Wikipedia articles, will have their names in kanji in parentheses upon first mention in the list. For the non-Japanese East Asian challengers, the Japanese pronunciation of the name as used in the show (or at least the name used by Chairman Kaga, if subtitled without voiceovers, in the English-dubbed versions) is also included.

In the case of East Asians with mixed Chinese-Japanese heritage, such as Chen Kenichi, they follow the same criteria as the Chinese names (i.e. Eastern order and Japanese pronunciation guide beside kanji).

== 1993 ==
Overall Episode #	Original airdate	Iron Chef	Challenger	Challenger Specialty	Theme Ingredient	Winner
1	October 10, 1993	Yutaka Ishinabe	Takeshi Maruyama (丸山 剛)	Chinese (Cantonese)	Salmon	Yutaka Ishinabe
2	October 17, 1993	Rokusaburo Michiba	Yōsei Kobayakawa (小早川陽青)	French	Foie gras	Rokusaburo Michiba
3	October 31, 1993	Chen Kenichi	(Italy) Paolo Indragoli	Italian	Tiger pufferfish	Chen Kenichi
4	November 7, 1993	Yutaka Ishinabe	Toshiyuki Kudō (工藤敏之)	French	Tofu	Yutaka Ishinabe
5	November 14, 1993	Rokusaburo Michiba	Zhou Tomiteru (周 富輝, Shū Tomiteru)	Chinese (Cantonese)	Lobster	Rokusaburo Michiba
6	November 21, 1993	Chen Kenichi	Cheng Kazuhiko (程 一彦, Tei Kazuhiko)	Chinese (Taiwanese)	Octopus	Cheng Kazuhiko
7	November 28, 1993	Yutaka Ishinabe	Masato Mutō (武藤正人)	Japanese	Daikon radish	Yutaka Ishinabe
8	December 5, 1993	Rokusaburo Michiba	Zhou Tomitoku (周 富徳, Shū Tomitoku)	Chinese (Cantonese)	Crab	Rokusaburo Michiba
9	December 12, 1993	Yutaka Ishinabe	Eizō Ōyama (大山栄蔵)	Dessert	Banana	Yutaka Ishinabe
10	December 19, 1993	Yutaka Ishinabe	(France) Jacques Borie	French	Chicken	Jacques Borie

^1 Premiere episode. Originally, episodes were broadcast in a 30-minute timeslot at 10:30 p.m. on Sunday nights, and for this first battle, the Iron Chef and Challenger were given 90 minutes of cooking time. This was reduced to 60 minutes in the next episode.
^2 This is the first battle featuring a foreign challenger.
^3 The challenger was the top apprentice of future Iron Chef French Hiroyuki Sakai.
^4 This is the first battle in which a challenger won against the Iron Chef, as well as the first episode after the preliminary battles and Honorary Iron Chef titles were scrapped.
^5 The challenger was the older brother of Zhou Tomiteru from the November 14, 1994 episode.
^6 Dessert showdown.
^7 Christmas showdown. This was the only battle prior to April 15, 1994 that received an English dub from Food Network, and it later became the final episode of said dub.

== 1994 ==
Overall Episode #	Original airdate	Iron Chef	Challenger	Challenger Specialty	Theme Ingredient	Winner
11	January 9, 1994	Rokusaburo Michiba	Zhou Tomitoku	Chinese (Cantonese)	Pork	Zhou Tomitoku
12	January 16, 1994	Chen Kenichi	(China) Wang Weiping (王 偉平, Wan Wīpin)	Chinese (Cantonese)	Squid	Chen Kenichi
13	January 23, 1994	Rokusaburo Michiba	Jun Hoshino (星野 淳)	None	Egg	Rokusaburo Michiba
14	January 30, 1994	Rokusaburo Michiba	Toshio Tanabe (田辺年男)	French	Sea bream	Rokusaburo Michiba
15	February 6, 1994	Chen Kenichi	Kōichi Taniguchi (谷口広一)	Japanese	Shrimp	Chen Kenichi
16	February 13, 1994	Rokusaburo Michiba	Kazuyoshi Masaki (正木数義)	Japanese	Conger eel	Rokusaburo Michiba
17	February 20, 1994	Chen Kenichi	Toshirō Kandagawa	Japanese	Flounder	Toshirō Kandagawa
18	February 27, 1994	Hiroyuki Sakai	(France) Guy Shokr	French	Oyster	Hiroyuki Sakai
19	March 6, 1994	Chen Kenichi	Shinji Kondō (近藤紳二)	Chinese (Shanghai)	Wheat flour	Chen Kenichi
20	March 13, 1994	Hiroyuki Sakai	Hiroyuki Kitami (北見博幸)	Italian	Tomato	Hiroyuki Sakai
21	March 20, 1994	Chen Kenichi	Kyōko Kagata (加賀田京子)	French	Scallop	Kyōko Kagata
22	March 27, 1994	Rokusaburo Michiba	Hideaki Otakura (小田倉秀昭)	Italian	Cheese	Rokusaburo Michiba
23	April 8, 1994	Rokusaburo Michiba	Kōichirō Gotō (後藤紘一良)	Japanese	Rice	Rokusaburo Michiba
24	April 15, 1994	Chen Kenichi	Munetaka Takahashi (高橋宗孝)	Japanese	Bamboo shoot	Chen Kenichi
25	April 22, 1994	Hiroyuki Sakai	Mario Nakagawa (中川麻里生)	French	Lamb	Hiroyuki Sakai
26	April 29, 1994	Rokusaburo Michiba	Yukio Hattori	None	Truffle	Rokusaburo Michiba
27	May 6, 1994	Chen Kenichi	Hiromi Yamada	Italian	Cabbage	Hiromi Yamada
28	May 13, 1994	Hiroyuki Sakai	Hiromi Funatsu (船津博美)	Japanese (Sushi)	Bonito	Hiroyuki Sakai
29	May 20, 1994	Hiroyuki Sakai	Masatoshi Kimura (木村政敏)	Chinese (Cantonese)	Duck	Hiroyuki Sakai
30	May 27, 1994	Chen Kenichi	Kiyoshi Takahashi (高橋 清)	Chinese (Cantonese)	Carrot	Chen Kenichi
31	June 3, 1994	Rokusaburo Michiba	Kuniyuki Ishikawa (石川邦行)	Japanese	Natto	Rokusaburo Michiba
32	June 10, 1994	Rokusaburo Michiba	Katsumi Hanato (花戸克己)	Japanese	Sweetfish	Rokusaburo Michiba
33	June 17, 1994	Hiroyuki Sakai	Yūji Wakiya	Chinese (Shanghai)	Sea urchin roe	Hiroyuki Sakai
34	June 24, 1994	Chen Kenichi	Masahiko Miyamoto (宮本雅彦)	French	Milk	Chen Kenichi
35	July 1, 1994	Chen Kenichi	Kōichi Tabata (田畑孝一)	Japanese	Eggplant	Chen Kenichi
36	July 8, 1994	Rokusaburo Michiba	Takashi Mera (米良 隆)	Japanese	Tuna	Rokusaburo Michiba
37	July 15, 1994	Hiroyuki Sakai	Tadaaki Shimizu (清水忠明)	French	Homard lobster	Tadaaki Shimizu
38	July 22, 1994	Rokusaburo Michiba & Chen Kenichi	(France) Joël Bruant & Masafumi Furutaka (古高雅史)	French	Sea bass	Joël Bruant & Masafumi Furutaka
39	July 29, 1994	Hiroyuki Sakai	Mitsuru Saitō (斎藤 満)	Chinese (Cantonese)	Beef	Hiroyuki Sakai
40	August 5, 1994	Rokusaburo Michiba	Yasuhiko Yoshida (吉田靖彦)	Japanese	Eel	Rokusaburo Michiba
41	August 12, 1994	Hiroyuki Sakai	Hirohisa Koyama (小山裕久)	Japanese	Pike conger	Hiroyuki Sakai
42	August 19, 1994	Chen Kenichi	Katsuyo Kobayashi (小林カツ代)	Home cooking	Potato	Katsuyo Kobayashi
43	August 26, 1994	Rokusaburo Michiba	Keiji Nakazawa (中澤敬二)	French	Corn	Rokusaburo Michiba
44	September 2, 1994	Chen Kenichi	Hideki Ōsako (大迫秀樹)	Italian	Mushroom	Chen Kenichi
45	September 9, 1994	Rokusaburo Michiba	(Germany) Artur Rütter	French	Bell pepper	Artur Rütter
46	September 16, 1994	Rokusaburo Michiba	Tsutomu Hiroi (廣井 勉)	French	Pacific saury	Rokusaburo Michiba
47	September 23, 1994	Hiroyuki Sakai	Sotetsu Fujii (藤井宗哲)	Japanese / Buddhist cuisine	Yam	Hiroyuki Sakai
48	September 30, 1994	Chen Kenichi	Takashi Saitō (斉藤隆士)	Chinese (Sichuan)	Shiba shrimp	Chen Kenichi
49	October 7, 1994	Hiroyuki Sakai	Masamitsu Takahashi (高橋正光)	Japanese	Matsutake mushroom	Masamitsu Takahashi
50	October 14, 1994	Rokusaburo Michiba	(Hong Kong) Xu Peirong (許沛榮, Hoi Choiwen)	Chinese (Cantonese)	Shark fin	Rokusaburo Michiba
51	October 21, 1994	Hiroyuki Sakai	Katsuyuki Sekihata (関端克之)	French	Bread	Hiroyuki Sakai
52	October 28, 1994	Chen Kenichi	Kōji Kobayashi (小林幸司)	Italian	Pumpkin	Koji Kobayashi
53	November 4, 1994	Rokusaburo Michiba	Yasuo Kawada (河田康雄)	Japanese	Anglerfish	Rokusaburo Michiba
54	November 11, 1994	Chen Kenichi	Tadashi Sugita (杉田 忠)	Chinese (Beijing)	Shanghai crab	Chen Kenichi
55	November 18, 1994	Rokusaburo Michiba	Tatsuo Umemiya (梅宮辰夫)	None	Horse mackerel	Rokusaburo Michiba
56	November 25, 1994	Hiroyuki Sakai	Seiya Kawasaki (川崎誠也)	French / Gibier	Quail	Seiya Kawasaki
57	December 2, 1994	Chen Kenichi	Toshikatsu Nakagawa (中川俊勝)	Chinese (Cantonese)	Noodles	Chen Kenichi
58	December 9, 1994	Rokusaburo Michiba	Hiroshi Furushō (古庄 浩)	French	Turkey	Rokusaburo Michiba
59	December 16, 1994	Hiroyuki Sakai	Masayo Waki (脇 雅世)	French	Strawberry	Hiroyuki Sakai

^8 This is the first rematch episode.
^9 The challenger was an amateur High School teacher at Kanagawa Kamigo High School.
^10 This and the next two consecutive episodes were the first appearances of recurring challenger Toshiro Kandagawa and his faction, with Kandagawa himself taking center stage in his third appearance.
^11 Sakai's first battle as Iron Chef.
^12 This is the first episode to feature a female challenger.
^13 Last episode broadcast in a 30-timeslot on Sunday nights at 10:30 p.m.
^14 From here on out, the show was broadcast in a 45-minute timeslot on Friday nights at 11:00 p.m. The cooking time was extended to 90 minutes for this battle. Michiba earned five consecutive wins as of this battle.
^15 Season 4 of Food Network's dub consisted of two Iron Chef spotlight specials, followed by the April 15 to September 23, 1994 episodes, though for unknown reasons, August 19 and 26 were switched.
^16 The challenger was the first Sushi chef.
^17 Sakai earned five consecutive wins as of this battle.
^18 Kandagawa Faction appearance.
^19 The challenger was recommended by Masahiro Yamamoto.
^20 This is the first tag team match wherein both teams have no assistants.
^21 Kandagawa Faction appeance. Michiba earned 10 consecutive individual wins as of this battle.
^22 There were two different Keiji Nakazawas with two different specialties who battled two different Iron Chefs Japanese almost five years apart. The first one, a French cuisine chef, battled against Michiba, while the other one, a sushi chef, battled against Morimoto.
^23 Season 5 of Food Network's dub consisted of the France Special from April 12, 1996, edited and split into two parts, followed by the September 30, 1994 to April 21, 1995 episodes. October 21 and December 23 from 1994, as well as January 2, March 31, and April 14 from 1995, were all skipped.
^24 The challenger was recommended by Katsuya Nomura. Michiba earned a second five-game winning streak as of this battle.
^25 Christmas dessert showdown.

The year ended with the 1994 Mr. Iron Chef competition; Part 1 aired on December 23, and Part 2 aired on January 2, 1995. This tournament featured winning challengers from previous episodes, each representing four different styles of cooking (Chinese, Italian, French, and Japanese), battling against each other. The winner then faced off against Michiba.

Jacques Borie was offered a spot as the French challenger, but declined. Artur Rütter was then asked, but the production staff was frustrated over him suddenly cancelling the offer, due to "a full restaurant reservation for Christmas". Shimizu was ultimately selected, with the approval of regular customers.

Overall Episode #	Original airdate	Challenger	Challenger	Theme Ingredient	Winner
60	December 23, 1994	Toshirō Kandagawa	Hiromi Yamada	Spiny lobster	Toshirō Kandagawa
60	December 23, 1994	Tadaaki Shimizu	Cheng Kazuhiko	Beef	Tadaaki Shimizu

Overall Episode #	Original airdate	Iron Chef	Challenger	Challenger Specialty	Theme Ingredient	Winner
60	January 2, 1995	Toshirō Kandagawa	Tadaaki Shimizu	1994 Mr. Iron Chef Preliminaries (Finals)	Abalone	Toshirō Kandagawa
60	January 2, 1995	Rokusaburo Michiba	Toshirō Kandagawa	1994 Mr. Iron Chef Finals	Yellowtail	Rokusaburo Michiba

== 1995 ==
Overall Episode #	Original airdate	Iron Chef	Challenger	Challenger Specialty	Theme Ingredient	Winner
61	January 6, 1995	Chen Kenichi	Toshiyuki Nakagawa (中川敏行)	Japanese	Mochi	Chen Kenichi
62	January 13, 1995	Hiroyuki Sakai	Kōji Yamada (山田康司)	French	Turnip	Hiroyuki Sakai
63	January 20, 1995	Chen Kenichi	Hisao Oidate (追立久夫)	Chinese (Cantonese)	Chinese cabbage	Chen Kenichi
64	January 27, 1995	Hiroyuki Sakai	Fuyuko Kondō (近藤冬子)	Pastries	Apple and chocolate	Hiroyuki Sakai
65	February 3, 1995	Chen Kenichi	Yoshie Urabe (卜部吉恵)	Japanese	Soybean	Chen Kenichi
66	February 10, 1995	Rokusaburo Michiba	Masao Suzuki (鈴木眞雄)	Fusion	Matsuba crab	Rokusaburo Michiba
67	February 17, 1995	Chen Kenichi	Kunihiko Hashimoto (橋本邦彦)	Japanese	Taro	Chen Kenichi
68	February 24, 1995	Hiroyuki Sakai	Toshihiro Komine (小峰敏宏)	French	Asparagus	Hiroyuki Sakai
69	March 3, 1995	Rokusaburo Michiba	(China) Wang Zhijian (王志堅, Wan Jichen)	Chinese (Cantonese)	Egg	Rokusaburo Michiba
70	March 10, 1995	Chen Kenichi	Tetsutoshi Shimazu (島津哲俊)	Italian	Spear squid	Chen Kenichi
71	March 17, 1995	Hiroyuki Sakai	Shigeo Yuasa (湯浅薰男)	French	Cod	Hiroyuki Sakai
72/73	March 31, 1995	Chen Kenichi	(Hong Kong) Leung Waikei (梁偉基, Ron Waikei)	Chinese (Cantonese)	Pork	Leung Waikei
72/73	March 31, 1995	Rokusaburo Michiba	(Hong Kong) Chow Chung (周中, Shū Chū)	Chinese (Cantonese)	Giant spiny lobster	Rokusaburo Michiba
74	April 7, 1995	Chen Kenichi	Chiyo Chō (張 千代)	Chinese (Cantonese)	Tofu	Chen Kenichi
75	April 14, 1995	Yutaka Ishinabe	Tomoyuki Sawaguchi (澤口知之)	Italian	Flounder	Yutaka Ishinabe
76	April 21, 1995	Hiroyuki Sakai	Kunio Santō (山東邦男)	Japanese	Clam	Hiroyuki Sakai
77	April 28, 1995	Rokusaburo Michiba	Keisuke Tamano (玉野圭介)	Japanese	Tilefish	Rokusaburo Michiba
78	May 5, 1995	Chen Kenichi	(South Korea) Lee Myong Suk (李明淑, Ri Meishō)	Korean	Liver	Chen Kenichi
79	May 12, 1995	Hiroyuki Sakai	Isao Yanagidate (柳舘 功)	French	Caviar	Hiroyuki Sakai
80	May 19, 1995	Chen Kenichi	(Italy) Elio Orsara	Italian	Marlin	Chen Kenichi
81	May 26, 1995	Rokusaburo Michiba	Etsuo Jō (城 悦男)	French	Broccoli	Rokusaburo Michiba
82	June 2, 1995	Hiroyuki Sakai	Katsuo Ōmiya (大宮勝雄)	Yōshoku (Japanese Western-style diner)	Onion	Hiroyuki Sakai
83	June 9, 1995	Hiroyuki Sakai	Kazutaka Okabe (岡部和隆)	French	Lamb	Kazutaka Okabe
84	June 16, 1995	Rokusaburo Michiba	(China) Zeng Mingxing (曽明星, Sō Meisei)	Chinese (Shanghai)	Blue crab	Zeng Mingxing
85	June 23, 1995	Chen Kenichi	Yukihiro Noda (野田幸宏)	Italian	Sardine	Chen Kenichi
86	June 30, 1995	Yutaka Ishinabe	Takayoshi Kamatani (釜谷孝義)	French	Avocado	Yutaka Ishinabe
87	July 7, 1995	Hiroyuki Sakai	(United States) Takayoshi Kawai (河合隆良)	French	Sole	Hiroyuki Sakai
88	July 14, 1995	Hiroyuki Sakai	Haruyoshi Omino (小美野晴愛)	Japanese	Sweetfish	Hiroyuki Sakai
89	July 21, 1995	Chen Kenichi	(Hong Kong) Lai Kamlun (黎錦倫, Rai Kamuron)	Chinese (Cantonese)	Swallow's nest	Chen Kenichi
90	July 28, 1995	Hiroyuki Sakai	Shin'ichi Nagamatsu (永松信一)	Italian	Eggplant	Hiroyuki Sakai
91	August 4, 1995	Chen Kenichi	Hisama Hirano (平野寿将)	Japanese	Sea urchin	Chen Kenichi
92	August 11, 1995	Rokusaburo Michiba	Kenji Kaji (梶 憲司)	Japanese	Umeboshi	Rokusaburo Michiba
93	August 18, 1995	Rokusaburo Michiba & Hiroyuki Sakai	(Italy) Salvatore & Raffaele Cuomo	Italian	Tomato	Rokusaburo Michiba & Hiroyuki Sakai
94	August 25, 1995	Chen Kenichi	Yoshiko Takemasa (武政佳子)	Japanese	Short-necked Clam	Chen Kenichi
95	September 1, 1995	Hiroyuki Sakai	(France) Joël Bruant	French	Salmon	Hiroyuki Sakai
96	September 8, 1995	Rokusaburo Michiba	(United States) Minoru Noda (野田 稔)	Japanese	Matsutake mushroom	Rokusaburo Michiba
97	September 15, 1995	Hiroyuki Sakai	(France) Philippe Aubron	French	Crayfish	Hiroyuki Sakai
98	September 22, 1995	Chen Kenichi	Tsuguo Fujiwara (藤原次雄)	Chinese (Shanghai)	Sea cucumber	Chen Kenichi
99/100/101	October 6, 1995	(France) Pierre Gagnaire	(Italy) Gianfranco Vissani	French (Gagnaire), Italian (Vissani)	Tuna	Gianfranco Vissani
99/100/101	October 6, 1995	Rokusaburo Michiba	(Hong Kong) Hsu Cheng (許成, Hoi Sei)	Chinese (Cantonese; Hsu)	Squid	Rokusaburo Michiba
99/100/101	October 6, 1995	Rokusaburo Michiba	(Italy) Gianfranco Vissani	Italian	Duck (Kamo)	Rokusaburo Michiba
102	October 13, 1995	Hiroyuki Sakai	Sadaharu Nakajima (中嶋貞治)	Japanese	Rice	Hiroyuki Sakai
103	October 20, 1995	Rokusaburo Michiba	(China) Lin Kunbi (林 訓美, Rin Kunbi)	Chinese (Fujian)	Potato	Draw
104	October 27, 1995	Rokusaburo Michiba	(China) Lin Kunbi (林 訓美, Rin Kunbi)	Chinese (Fujian)	Sweet potato	Rokusaburo Michiba
105	November 3, 1995	Chen Kenichi	Masahiko Hagiwara (萩原雅彦)	Italian	Scampi	Chen Kenichi
106	November 10, 1995	Chen Kenichi	Kiyotaka Ikegawa (池川清隆)		Horsehair crab	Chen Kenichi
107	November 17, 1995	Hiroyuki Sakai	Toshirō Kandagawa	Japanese	Lotus root	Hiroyuki Sakai
108	November 24, 1995	Hiroyuki Sakai	(France) Bruno Menard	French	Escargot	Hiroyuki Sakai
109	December 1, 1995	Chen Kenichi	Shōzō Miyamoto (宮本荘三)	Chinese (Shanghai)	Carp	Chen Kenichi
110	December 8, 1995	Hiroyuki Sakai	Tadamichi Ōta (大田忠道)	Japanese	Octopus	Tadamichi Ōta
111	December 15, 1995	Hiroyuki Sakai	(France) Philippe Groult	French	Oyster	Hiroyuki Sakai

^26 The challenger was recommended by former Iron Chef French Yutaka Ishinabe.
^27 This is the Valentine's Day dessert showdown. Also the first battle to feature two theme ingredients.
^28 Kandagawa Faction appearance. Chen earned five consecutive wins as of this battle.
^29 The challenger was recommended by Morio Mita.
^30 Sakai earned his second five-game winning streak as of this battle.
^31 Hong Kong Special. This Special is notable for featuring an appearance by Jackie Chan as a judge during the second battle. The show earned its highest viewership on this day with a score of 23.2%. A scoring system that was later added in October was experimented with here.
^32 This episode was Ishinabe's first of two return matches as Iron Chef French. The challenger stated in his introduction that he requested to only battle Ishinabe.
^33 This is Ishinabe's final ever battle as an Iron Chef.
^34 Second ever tag-team battle.
^35 This is Bruant's second appearance in Kitchen Stadium, challenging the Iron Chef he did not choose in the tag-team battle the year before.
^36 The 1995 Iron Chef World Cup at Ariake Coliseum, which pitted the masters of French, Japanese, Italian, and Chinese cuisines against each other in a single-elimination tournament to determine the best in the world. The winners of the first two battles squared off against each other in the final match. Michiba represented Japanese cuisine, hence the retention of his Iron Chef color in this chart. The final is also covered in the English-only exclusive "Legend of Michiba" episode.
^37 The first episode to expand the panel of judges from three to four, and where they started displaying the judging panel's scores.
^38 & ^39 Lin and Michiba's battle ended in a draw, hence the overtime match the next week with a new theme ingredient.
^40 Kandagawa was the 100th even challenger, when separate appearances count into two. This number doesn't take into account the challengers who battled in the 1994 Mr. Iron Chef, Hong Kong, and 1995 World Cup Specials, or the first overtime battle on October 27, 1995, and for both tag-team matches that had been done up to this point, the duo challengers were counted as one.

The year ended with the 1995 Mr. Iron Chef competition; Part 1 aired on December 22, and Part 2 aired on January 3, 1996. The winner then faced off against Michiba in his last battle as a regular Iron Chef.

Overall Episode #	Original airdate	Iron Chef	Iron Chef	Theme Ingredient	Winner
112	December 22, 1995	Chen Kenichi	Hiroyuki Sakai	Chicken	Chen Kenichi

Overall Episode #	Original airdate	Iron Chef	Iron Chef	Theme Ingredient	Winner
113	January 3, 1996	Rokusaburo Michiba	Chen Kenichi	Beef	Rokusaburo Michiba

== 1996 ==
Overall Episode #	Original airdate	Iron Chef	Challenger	Challenger Specialty	Theme Ingredient	Winner
114	January 12, 1996	Chen Kenichi	(Taiwan) Gao Jinyi (高進益, Kō Shin'eki)	Chinese (Taiwanese)	Dried abalone	Chen Kenichi
115	January 19, 1996	Hiroyuki Sakai	Hidetoshi Ushimaru (牛丸英敏)	French	Curry powder	Hiroyuki Sakai
116	January 26, 1996	Chen Kenichi	Hiroshi Yamanobe (山野辺 宏)	French	Scorpionfish	Hiroshi Yamanobe
117	February 2, 1996	Chen Kenichi	Yōji Watanabe (渡辺洋二)	Japanese	Snapping turtle	Chen Kenichi
118	February 9, 1996	Hiroyuki Sakai	Tadashi Yanagi (柳 正司)	French	Chocolate and pear	Hiroyuki Sakai
119	February 16, 1996	Hiroyuki Sakai	Jin'ichi Tateyama (舘山仁一)	French	Leek	Hiroyuki Sakai
120	February 23, 1996	Chen Kenichi	Takaya Nakazawa (中沢隆弥)	Chinese (Sichuan)	Shiitake mushroom	Takaya Nakazawa
121	March 1, 1996	Komei Nakamura	Kiyoshi Suzuki (鈴木喜代司)	French	Foie gras	Komei Nakamura
122	March 8, 1996	Chen Kenichi	Tatsujirō Yoshida (吉田辰次郎)	Japanese	Cod	Chen Kenichi
123	March 15, 1996	Hiroyuki Sakai	Senji Osada (長田銑司)	Japanese and sous vide cooking	Scallop	Hiroyuki Sakai
124	March 22, 1996	Komei Nakamura	(China) Lin Kunbi	Chinese (Fujian)	Bell pepper	Komei Nakamura
125	March 29, 1996	Chen Kenichi	Katsuaki Mori (森 克明)	Italian	Spinach	Chen Kenichi
126/127	April 12, 1996	Komei Nakamura	(France) Bernard Leprince	French	Salmon	Bernard Leprince
126/127	April 12, 1996	Hiroyuki Sakai	(France) Pierre Gagnaire	French	Lobster	Pierre Gagnaire
128	April 19, 1996	Komei Nakamura	Toyoaki Suganuma (菅沼豊明)	French	Egg	Toyoaki Suganuma
129	April 26, 1996	Chen Kenichi	(Hong Kong) He Yewen (何業文, Ho Gyōmon)	Chinese (Cantonese)	Lettuce	Chen Kenichi
130	May 3, 1996	Komei Nakamura	Katsuko Nanao (七尾かつ子)	Home cooking	Cod roe	Komei Nakamura
131	May 10, 1996	Chen Kenichi	Shunji Morikawa (森川俊二)	Thai	Pineapple	Chen Kenichi
132	May 17, 1996	Hiroyuki Sakai	Tamotsu Takao (高尾 保)	French	Abalone	Hiroyuki Sakai
133	May 24, 1996	Komei Nakamura	Kenji Motai (もたい健治)	Japanese	Udon	Kenji Motai
134	May 31, 1996	Chen Kenichi	Ichio Gotō (後藤市雄)	Italian	Cuttlefish	Chen Kenichi
135	June 7, 1996	Hiroyuki Sakai	Yoshinobu Sonobe (曽野部好信)	Japanese	Salmon roe	Hiroyuki Sakai
136	June 14, 1996	Komei Nakamura	(China) Sun Guanyi (孫関義, Son Kangi)	Chinese (Shanghai)	Pomfret	Komei Nakamura
137	June 21, 1996	Hiroyuki Sakai	(France) Philippe Batton	French	Bacon	Philippe Batton
138	June 28, 1996	Komei Nakamura	Hideo Tozawa (戸沢英夫)	Spanish	Clam	Komei Nakamura
139	July 5, 1996	Chen Kenichi	Takayuki Nomura (野村孝之)	Japanese	Sweetfish	Chen Kenichi
140	July 12, 1996	Komei Nakamura	Hideki Yamamoto (山本秀樹)	Japanese	Pike conger	Komei Nakamura
141	July 19, 1996	Hiroyuki Sakai	Yoshimasa Uki (浮 義正)	Japanese	Fatty tuna (Chuutoro)	Hiroyuki Sakai
142	July 26, 1996	Komei Nakamura	Masaru Toriumi (鳥海 勝)	French	Iwa oyster	Masaru Toriumi
143	August 2, 1996	Chen Kenichi	Takeshi Yamamoto (山本 猛)	Chinese (Cantonese)	Black pork	Chen Kenichi
144	August 9, 1996	Komei Nakamura	(France) Thierry Houngues	French	Caviar	Komei Nakamura
145	August 16, 1996	Chen Kenichi	Toshizō Tsugawa (津川利蔵)	Sushi	Conger eel	Chen Kenichi
146	August 23, 1996	Hiroyuki Sakai	Kenji Sugawara (菅原健二)	California	Corn	Hiroyuki Sakai
147	August 30, 1996	Chen Kenichi	Shinsuke Shimada (島田紳助)		Taisho shrimp	Chen Kenichi
148	September 6, 1996	Komei Nakamura	Takamasa Uetake (植竹隆政)	Italian	Peach	Takamasa Uetake
149	September 13, 1996	Hiroyuki Sakai	Chōmei Sō (曽 兆明)	Chinese (Cantonese)	Soft-shell crab	Hiroyuki Sakai
150	September 20, 1996	Komei Nakamura	Tokuo Endō (遠藤徳雄)	Japanese	Saury	Komei Nakamura
151	October 4, 1996	Chen Kenichi	Takeo Kashiwabara (柏原剛雄)	Okinawan	Winter melon	Chen Kenichi
152/153	October 11, 1996	Chen Kenichi	(China) Sun Liping (孫利平, Son Rihei) (China) Su Dexing (蘇徳興, So Tokushin) (China) Zhuang Weijia (庄偉佳, Shō Ika)	Chinese (Beijing); Chinese (Shanghai); Chinese (Cantonese)	Chicken	Chen Kenichi; Sun Liping
152/153	October 11, 1996	Chen Kenichi	(China) Sun Liping (孫利平, Son Rihei)	Chinese (Beijing)	Shark fin	Chen Kenichi
154	October 18, 1996	Komei Nakamura	Shin Fujita (藤田 新)	Japanese	Buckwheat	Komei Nakamura
155	October 25, 1996	Komei Nakamura	Ryūichi Ogusu (小楠隆一)	French	Chestnut	Komei Nakamura
156	November 1, 1996	Chen Kenichi	(Italy) Daniela Ozik	Italian	Mushroom	Chen Kenichi
157	November 8, 1996	Hiroyuki Sakai	Hiroshi Yamaoka (山岡 洋)	Chinese (Cantonese)	Chinese cabbage	Hiroshi Yamaoka
158	November 15, 1996	Hiroyuki Sakai	(United States) Wayne Nish	New American	Apple	Hiroyuki Sakai
159	November 22, 1996	Komei Nakamura	Kenjirō Kuroki (黒木献二郎)	Japanese	Angler	Komei Nakamura
160	November 29, 1996	Komei Nakamura	Kiyoshi Miyashiro (宮代 潔)	French	Beef tongue	Komei Nakamura
161	December 6, 1996	Chen Kenichi	Yukio Ishizaki (石崎幸雄)	Italian	Garlic	Chen Kenichi
162	December 13, 1996	Hiroyuki Sakai	Yoshio Suzuki (鈴木芳男)	French	Orange	Hiroyuki Sakai
163	December 20, 1996	Komei Nakamura	(France) Bernard Leprince	French	Duck (Kamo)	Bernard Leprince

^41 This episode debuts Nakamura as Michiba's hand picked successor.
^42 This episode, known as the France Special, took place in Château de Brissac in Anjou, France. It also took place to promote Gagnaire's restaurant, which was on the verge of closing. This episode was aired as two separate episodes in the dubbed version (although these two merged as a single two-hour episode in the Food Network).
^66 Thierry Hongues is the first black challenger to compete on Iron Chef. Hongues was endorsed by Brazilian ambassador to Japan Fernando Lace, who also accompanied him to Kitchen Stadium, as the episode was presented as the tie-breaker between the two nations after Japan defeated Brazil in Soccer and Brazil defeated Japan in Judo at the 1996 Atlanta Olympics.
^43 The three-hour Beijing Special taking place in the Forbidden City and pitting the best of four styles of Chinese cooking (Canton, Beijing, Shanghai, and Sichuan) against each other. The first battle was a semifinal round with all four chefs, with the chefs with the two highest scores advancing to the final.
^44 This episode served as a rematch to their battle back in France.

The last episode of 1996 is the New Year's Eve episode, where 100 judges (including challengers from past episodes, who were there to provide extra ingredients for the battle) were said to have sampled the osechi New Year food prepared by Michiba and Nakamura, which took 100 minutes and 10 assistants each to make, with the battle concluding at midnight on New Year's. The theme ingredients were decided at the Yabusame venue set up in front of the Odaiba FCG building. Four of them were assigned to three groups; Meat (Beef, Chicken, Duck, and Pork), Vegetables (Carrot, Radish, Sweet Potato, and Green Pepper), and Fish (Salmon, Yellowtail, Octopus, and Spiny Lobster).

Overall Episode #	Original airdate	Iron Chef	Iron Chef	Theme Ingredient	Winner
164	December 31, 1996	Komei Nakamura	Rokusaburo Michiba	Osechi (Pork, sweet potato, & octopus)	Komei Nakamura

== 1997 ==
Overall Episode #	Original airdate	Iron Chef	Challenger	Challenger Specialty	Theme Ingredient	Winner
165	January 10, 1997	Hiroyuki Sakai	Hiroshi Kasahara (笠原 寛)	Japanese	Mochi	Hiroyuki Sakai
166	January 17, 1997	Chen Kenichi	Hiroshi Michifude (道筆 博)	Chinese (Cantonese)	Dried scallop	Hiroshi Michifude
167	January 24, 1997	Hiroyuki Sakai	(United Kingdom) Rory Kennedy	Gibier	European rabbit	Draw
168	January 31, 1997	Hiroyuki Sakai	(United Kingdom) Rory Kennedy	Gibier	European pigeon	Hiroyuki Sakai
169	February 7, 1997	Komei Nakamura	Hiroyoshi Morieda (森枝弘好)	Japanese	Spider crab	Komei Nakamura
170	February 14, 1997	Chen Kenichi	(China) Huang Baokang (黄宝康, Kō Hōko)	Chinese (Fujian)	Rice	Chen Kenichi
171	February 21, 1997	Hiroyuki Sakai	Tetsuya Shimada (島田哲也)	French	Truffle	Hiroyuki Sakai
172	February 28, 1997	Komei Nakamura	Tateo Yamazaki (山崎建夫)	Japanese	Natto	Komei Nakamura
173	March 7, 1997	Hiroyuki Sakai	Etsuo Jō	French	Wine	Etsuo Jō
174	March 14, 1997	Chen Kenichi	Yūji Wakiya	Chinese (Cantonese)	Papaya	Yūji Wakiya
175	March 21, 1997	Komei Nakamura	Takashi Mera	Japanese	Wakame seaweed	Komei Nakamura
176	March 28, 1997	Hiroyuki Sakai	Hiroyuki Kitami	Italian	Honey	Hiroyuki Sakai
177	April 11, 1997	Komei Nakamura	(China) Yang Guangjian (揚光鑑, Yō Kōkan)	Chinese (Cantonese)	Hanami	Komei Nakamura
178	April 18, 1997	Hiroyuki Sakai	Shinzō Okumura (奥村眞三)	French	Bamboo shoot	Hiroyuki Sakai
179	April 25, 1997	Chen Kenichi	Chihiro Ōtsuki (おおつきちひろ)	Spanish	Tomato	Chen Kenichi
180	May 2, 1997	Hiroyuki Sakai	Kiyoyoshi Sasaki (佐々木清恭)	French	Sea Bass	Hiroyuki Sakai
181	May 9, 1997	Komei Nakamura	Norio Azumaya (東屋則夫)	Japanese	Pork	Komei Nakamura
182	May 16, 1997	Komei Nakamura	(Australia) Gillian Hirst	Australian	Ostrich	Komei Nakamura
183	May 23, 1997	Chen Kenichi	Masao Takagi (高木政雄)	Chinese (Cantonese)	Thousand-year old egg	Chen Kenichi
184	May 30, 1997	Hiroyuki Sakai	(Italy) Germano Orsara	Italian	Ham	Hiroyuki Sakai
185	June 6, 1997	Komei Nakamura	Hisato Sakane (坂根久人)	Japanese	Conger eel	Hisato Sakane
186	June 13, 1997	Masahiko Kobe	Masahiko Hagiwara	Italian	Short pasta	Masahiko Hagiwara
187	June 20, 1997	Hiroyuki Sakai	Kunio Satō (佐藤訓生)	Japanese	Amberjack	Hiroyuki Sakai
188	June 27, 1997	Chen Kenichi	(Hong Kong) Chow Kuen Chung (周権忠, Shū Kenchū)	Chinese (Cantonese)	Blacktip grouper	Chow Kuen Chung
189	July 4, 1997	Komei Nakamura	Masami Kashima (鹿島正己)	Vietnamese	Kuruma shrimp	Komei Nakamura
190	July 11, 1997	Hiroyuki Sakai	Toshiyuki Ishikawa (石川敏行)	Chinese (Shanghai)	Sea urchin roe	Hiroyuki Sakai
191	July 18, 1997	Chen Kenichi	Yoshikazu Matsuno (松野義一)	Chinese/Sushi	Mantis shrimp	Chen Kenichi
192	July 25, 1997	Masahiko Kobe	(Italy) Stefano Tabacchi	Italian	Cabbage	Masahiko Kobe
193	August 1, 1997	Hiroyuki Sakai	Seiji Toyoshima (豊嶋誠司)	French	Milk	Hiroyuki Sakai
194	August 8, 1997	Chen Kenichi & Komei Nakamura	Hiroyuki Sakai & Masahiko Kobe	Iron Chef	Watermelon	Hiroyuki Sakai & Masahiko Kobe
195	August 15, 1997	Chen Kenichi	Sōsei Kawaguchi (川口宗清)	Vegetarian (Buddhist)	Eggplant	Chen Kenichi
196	August 22, 1997	Hiroyuki Sakai	(Italy) Pietro Androsoni	Italian	Melon	Hiroyuki Sakai
197	August 29, 1997	Komei Nakamura	Yoshinori Kojima (小島孔典)	French	Potato	No Contest
198	September 5, 1997	Komei Nakamura	Yoshinori Kojima (小島孔典)	French	Marbled sole	Komei Nakamura
199	September 12, 1997	Hiroyuki Sakai	Toshiyuki Nakajima (中嶋壽幸)	French	Beef cheek	Toshiyuki Nakajima
200	September 26, 1997	Chen Kenichi	Miyuki Igarashi (五十嵐美幸)	Chinese (Cantonese)	Cucumber	Chen Kenichi
201	October 3, 1997	Masahiko Kobe	Fujio Imai (今井富士男)	Japanese	Matsutake mushroom	Masahiko Kobe
202/203/204	October 10, 1997	Komei Nakamura	(China) Liu Xikun (劉錫坤, Ryū Sekikon)	Chinese (Cantonese; Liu)	Beef	Komei Nakamura
202/203/204	October 10, 1997	(France) Alain Passard	(United States) Patrick Clark	French (Passard); New American (Clark)	Lobster	Alain Passard
202/203/204	October 10, 1997	Komei Nakamura	(France) Alain Passard	French	Foie gras	Draw
205	October 17, 1997	Chen Kenichi	Matsuo Nagasaka (長坂松夫)	Chinese (Cantonese)	Spare rib	Chen Kenichi
206	October 24, 1997	Hiroyuki Sakai	Masashi Gotō (後藤雅司)	French	Freshwater shrimp	Hiroyuki Sakai
207	October 31, 1997	Masahiko Kobe	Yūji Seki (関 雄二)	Chinese (Beijing)	Chestnut	Masahiko Kobe
208	November 14, 1997	Komei Nakamura	Keiji Azuma (東 敬司)	French	Lamb	Keiji Azuma
209	November 21, 1997	Chen Kenichi	Toru Matsushima (松島 徹)	Chinese (Shanghai)	Shanghai crab	Chen Kenichi
210	November 28, 1997	Masahiko Kobe	Kazunari Takeda (高橋和名利)	Japanese	Cod soft roe	Draw
211	December 5, 1997	Masahiko Kobe	Kazunari Takeda (高橋和名利)	Japanese	Pink shrimp	Kazunari Takeda
212	December 12, 1997	Komei Nakamura	(France) Maurice Guillouët	French	Scallop	Maurice Guillouët
213	December 19, 1997	Masahiko Kobe	Yasumasa Takagi (高木康政)	French	Strawberry	Masahiko Kobe
214	December 26, 1997	Komei Nakamura	Toshirō Kandagawa	Japanese	Longtooth grouper	Toshirō Kandagawa

^45 Wild animals hunted for game.
^46 This is the second overtime episode.
^47 This, and the next three consecutive episodes, all featured past challengers returning. Before cooking began, they were given an option of which of four theme ingredients, all hidden under four boxes labeled A-D each, to choose from.
^48 There was no theme ingredient, just a theme that the chefs' dishes must focus on.
^49 This is Kobe's debut battle as an Iron Chef, and he loses.
^50 For the summer battle, Chairman Kaga grouped the four Iron Chefs by the continental birthplace of their cuisines. Kobe and Sakai composed "Team Europe" while Chen and Nakamura were "Team Asia."
^51 This episode covers the 1997 Iron Chef World Cup. Much like the 1995 Iron Chef World Cup, it pitted the masters of French, Japanese, Chinese, and New American (instead of Italian) cuisines against each other in elimination matches. The winners of the first two battles squared off against each other in the final match. Nakamura represented Japanese cuisine, hence the retention of his Iron Chef color in this chart.
^52 This is the first drawn battle that did not immediately result in an overtime match. In fact, a rematch between Passard and Nakamura never took place.
^53 Guillouët was the 200th even challenger, when separate appearances count as two. This number takes into account the challengers who battled in the 1996 France, 1996 Beijing, and 1997 World Cup Specials, as well as counting Yoshinori Kojima as two challengers because of his first match ending in "No Contest" due to the dishes not being of sufficient quality for judging. However, Philippe Batton, Philippe Aubron, Bruno Menard, and Thierry Houngues were counted as 132nd, 97th, 105th, and 139th respectively.

== 1998 ==
Overall Episode #	Original airdate	Iron Chef	Challenger	Challenger Specialty	Theme Ingredient	Winner
215	January 9, 1998	Chen Kenichi	Akihiko Inoue (井上明彦)	Japanese	Salted salmon	Chen Kenichi
216	January 16, 1998	Masahiko Kobe	Yasuhiro Fukatsu (深津泰弘)	French	Venison	Yasuhiro Fukatsu
217	January 23, 1998	Hiroyuki Sakai	Yoshimasa Matsumoto (松本吉正)	Japanese	Snow crab	Hiroyuki Sakai
218	January 30, 1998	Chen Kenichi	(Hong Kong) Tong Chiufai (唐 朝輝, Tō Chōki)	Chinese (Cantonese)	Black tiger shrimp	Chen Kenichi
219	February 6, 1998	Hiroyuki Sakai	Fumiaki Satō (佐藤文昭)	Japanese	Daikon radish	Fumiaki Satō
220	February 13, 1998	Komei Nakamura	Yukio Hattori	None	Tuna	Komei Nakamura
220	February 20, 1998	Komei Nakamura	Yukio Hattori	None	Tuna	Komei Nakamura
221	February 27, 1998	Masaharu Morimoto	Yukio Hirayama (平山幸男)	Japanese	Red snapper	Masaharu Morimoto
222	March 6, 1998	Hiroyuki Sakai	Motohito Kondō (近藤元人)	Japanese	Girl's Festival	Hiroyuki Sakai
223	March 13, 1998	Masahiko Kobe	(Italy) Mario Frittoli	Italian	Broccoli	Masahiko Kobe
224	April 3, 1998	Masaharu Morimoto	Masayoshi Kimura (木村昌義)	Chinese (Sichuan)	Rice	Masaharu Morimoto
225	April 10, 1998	Hiroyuki Sakai	Tomoji Ichikawa (市川知志)	French	Guinea fowl / Wedgwood china	Hiroyuki Sakai
226	April 17, 1998	Chen Kenichi	Mitsurō Harada (原田充朗)	Japanese	Spanish mackerel	Mitsurō Harada
227	April 24, 1998	Chen Kenichi	Takashi Shimamura (島村 隆)	Japanese	Pen shell	Chen Kenichi
228	May 1, 1998	Masaharu Morimoto	Tetsuo Hagiwara (萩原哲雄)	Japanese	Bamboo shoot / Boy's Festival	Tetsuo Hagiwara
229	May 8, 1998	Masahiko Kobe	Yōsei Watanabe (渡辺庸生)	Mexican	Mango	Masahiko Kobe
230	May 15, 1998	Masaharu Morimoto	Yasuhiko Habuchi (羽渕康彦)	French	Asparagus	Masaharu Morimoto
231	May 22, 1998	Chen Kenichi	(China) Liang Shuqing (粱樹卿, Ryō Jukei)	Chinese (Cantonese)	Pork belly	Draw
232	May 29, 1998	Chen Kenichi	(China) Liang Shuqing (粱樹卿, Ryō Jukei)	Chinese (Cantonese)	Konnyaku	Liang Shuqing
233	June 5, 1998	Hiroyuki Sakai	Kumiko Kobayashi (小林久美子)	French	Mishima beef	Hiroyuki Sakai
234	June 12, 1998	Masaharu Morimoto	Ken'ichi Miyanaga (宮永賢一)	Japanese	Sweetfish	Masaharu Morimoto
235	June 19, 1998	Chen Kenichi	Kentarō (ケンタロウ)	(Home cooking/Food critic)	New potato	Chen Kenichi
236	June 26, 1998	Masahiko Kobe	Yasuhiro Sasajima (笹島保弘)	Italian	Kamo eggplant	Masahiko Kobe
237	July 3, 1998	Masaharu Morimoto	Takaji Yoshida (吉田隆二)	Japanese	Tofu	Masaharu Morimoto
238	July 10, 1998	Hiroyuki Sakai	Shūzō Shimokawa (下川秀蔵)	Chinese (Cantonese)	Jinhua pork	Hiroyuki Sakai
239	July 17, 1998	Chen Kenichi	Jun'ichi Itō (伊東淳一)	French-Italian-Japanese fusion	Yogurt	Chen Kenichi
240	July 24, 1998	Masaharu Morimoto	Takeshi Kajimoto (梶本剛史)	Japanese	Abalone	Takeshi Kajimoto
241	July 31, 1998	Masahiko Kobe	Miyoko Sakai (酒井美代子)	Thai	Japanese blue crab	Masahiko Kobe
242	August 7, 1998	Masaharu Morimoto	Hirokazu Handa (半田博一)	Japanese	Giant eel	Masaharu Morimoto
243	August 14, 1998	Hiroyuki Sakai	Masanobu Watabe (渡部政信)	French	Peach	Hiroyuki Sakai
244	August 21, 1998	Chen Kenichi	Kaoru Miyazawa (宮澤 薫)	Chinese (Chiuchow)	Carp	Chen Kenichi
245	August 28, 1998	"All French" (Hiroyuki Sakai, Yutaka Ishinabe, & Etsuo Jō)	"All China" (Chen Kenichi, Shōzō Miyamoto, & Yūji Wakiya)	2,000th Plate	Spare rib, snapping turtle, and banana	"All French"
245	September 4, 1998	"All French" (Hiroyuki Sakai, Yutaka Ishinabe, & Etsuo Jō)	"All China" (Chen Kenichi, Shōzō Miyamoto, & Yūji Wakiya)	2,000th Plate	Spare rib, snapping turtle, and banana	"All French"
246	September 11, 1998	Hiroyuki Sakai	Kyōnori Miura (三浦経則)	Italian	Squid	Hiroyuki Sakai
247	September 18, 1998	Chen Kenichi	Hideki Maruyama (丸山日出樹)	Italian	Sardine	Chen Kenichi
248	September 25, 1998	Masaharu Morimoto	Shuichi Fujii (藤井修一)	Japanese	Unisex salmon	Masaharu Morimoto
249	October 2, 1998	Masahiko Kobe	Shin'ya Tasaki (田崎真也)	Wine	Fatty tuna	Shin'ya Tasaki
250	October 9, 1998	Hiroyuki Sakai	(United States) Ron Siegel	French	Lobster	Ron Siegel
251	October 16, 1998	Chen Kenichi	Kyōko Kagata	French	Veal	Chen Kenichi
252	October 23, 1998	Masaharu Morimoto	Tatsutoshi Kumamoto (隈本辰利)	Japanese	Natto	Masaharu Morimoto
253	October 30, 1998	Masahiko Kobe	Kensuke Sakai (坂井謙介)	Italian	Pumpkin	Masahiko Kobe
254	November 6, 1998	Hiroyuki Sakai	Kazumi Nagayama (永山和美)	Japanese	Pacific saury	Hiroyuki Sakai
255	November 13, 1998	Chen Kenichi	Hisao Yaginuma (八木沼久男)	Chinese (Cantonese)	Shanghai cabbage	Chen Kenichi
256	November 20, 1998	Masahiko Kobe	Takatsugu Sasaoka (笹岡隆次)	Japanese	Maitake mushroom	Takatsugu Sasaoka
257	November 27, 1998	Masaharu Morimoto	(Italy) Marco Molinari	Italian	Porcini	Marco Molinari
258	December 4, 1998	Hiroyuki Sakai	Mitsuo Hazama (間 光男)	French	Duck	Hiroyuki Sakai
259	December 11, 1998	Masahiko Kobe	Hiromichi Yoneda (米田裕道)	Italian	Octopus	Masahiko Kobe
260	December 18, 1998	Chen Kenichi	Mitsuo Suganuma (菅沼美都雄)	Chinese (Cantonese)	Shark fin	Chen Kenichi
261	December 25, 1998	Masaharu Morimoto	Jirō Ogue (小久江次郎)	French	Turkey	Masaharu Morimoto

^54 This episode, recorded on January 18, 1998, was the last appearance of Tamio Kageyama as a judge before his death in a house fire.
^55 This episode featuring Nakamura's retirement battle, counted as one, was aired in two parts. This was also Yukio Hattori's second time taking the role of challenger; former Iron Chef Japanese Rokusaburo Michiba took his place as commentator.
^56 This is Masaharu Morimoto's debut as Iron Chef.
^57 This episode is the second without a theme ingredient but rather a theme on which the dishes should be based.
^58 The 2,000th Dish Special, wherein two teams composed of Iron Chefs and past challengers, was aired in two parts. Chairman Kaga also used this special as an opportunity to list his five best and three worst dishes tasted in the show. The score was tied at 77 points for each team, but Kaga decided that the All-French team won.

== 1999 ==
Overall Episode #	Original airdate	Iron Chef	Challenger	Challenger Specialty	Theme Ingredient	Winner
262	January 8, 1999	Chen Kenichi	(China) Xie Huaxian (謝華顕, Sha Kaken)	Chinese (Cantonese)	Spiny lobster	Xie Huaxian
263	January 15, 1999	Hiroyuki Sakai	Kōei Kamimura (上村孝栄)	Japanese	Cod	Hiroyuki Sakai
264	January 22, 1999	Masahiko Kobe	(Italy) Constantino Gemmoli	Italian	Bell pepper	Masahiko Kobe
265	January 29, 1999	Masaharu Morimoto	Hiroyuki Hakogi (函城弘行)	Japanese	Yellowtail	Masaharu Morimoto
266	February 5, 1999	Masaharu Morimoto	Tetsuji Iio (飯尾哲司)	French	King crab	Masaharu Morimoto
267	February 12, 1999	Masahiko Kobe	Hironobu Tsujiguchi (辻口博啓)	Dessert	Banana	Hironobu Tsujiguchi
268	February 19, 1999	Hiroyuki Sakai	Toshiya Senba (仙場才也)	Japanese	Asura oyster	Hiroyuki Sakai
269	February 26, 1999	Chen Kenichi	Ryōzō Asō (浅生良三)	French	Sturgeon	Chen Kenichi
270	March 5, 1999	Michiba and Morimoto tour New York City. No battles were held in this part.				
270	March 12, 1999	Masaharu Morimoto	Komei Nakamura	Iron Chef	Egg	Komei Nakamura
271	March 19, 1999	Hiroyuki Sakai	Kōji Hosogai (細貝孝司)	French	Oxtail	Hiroyuki Sakai
272	March 26, 1999	Masaharu Morimoto	Seiya Masahara (正原聖也)	Japanese	Anglerfish	Seiya Masahara
273	April 2, 1999	Chen Kenichi	(China) Cui Yufen (崔玉芬, Gai Gyokufun)	Chinese (Beijing)	Chinese cabbage	Cui Yufen
274	April 9, 1999	Hiroyuki Sakai	Tōru Komori (小森 亨)	Japanese	Udon	Tōru Komori
275	April 16, 1999	Masahiko Kobe	(Italy) Franco Canzoniere	Italian	Tomato	Masahiko Kobe
276	April 23, 1999	Masaharu Morimoto	Yūsuke Yamashita (山下裕輔)	Japanese	Cod roe	Draw
277	April 30, 1999	Masaharu Morimoto	Yūsuke Yamashita (山下裕輔)	Japanese	Scallion	Masaharu Morimoto
278	May 7, 1999	Chen Kenichi	Takeshi Ōkubo (大久保武志)	Chinese (Cantonese)	Bean sprout	Takeshi Ōkubo
279	May 14, 1999	Hiroyuki Sakai	(France) Michel Husser	French	Lamb	Michel Husser
280	May 21, 1999	Chen Kenichi	(Italy) Spano Stelvio	Italian	Suckling pig	Chen Kenichi
N/A	May 28, 1999	Morimoto and Michiba tour Indonesia. No battles were held in this episode (in both parts). Morimoto and Michiba appear on Resep oke Rudy broadcast by RCTI				
N/A	June 4, 1999	Morimoto and Michiba tour Indonesia. No battles were held in this episode (in both parts). Morimoto and Michiba appear on Resep oke Rudy broadcast by RCTI				
281	June 11, 1999	Masahiko Kobe	Makoto Osada (長田 誠)	Chinese (Cantonese)	Giant lobster	Masahiko Kobe
282	June 18, 1999	Masaharu Morimoto	Keiji Nakazawa (中澤圭二)	Japanese	Sushi	Masaharu Morimoto
283	June 25, 1999	Hiroyuki Sakai	Isao Makio (牧尾 勲)	French	Black pork	Hiroyuki Sakai
284	July 2, 1999	Masaharu Morimoto	(Canada) Michael Noble	French	Potato	Masaharu Morimoto
285	July 9, 1999	Chen Kenichi	Yūji Tateno (舘野雄二)	Japanese	Sea urchin roe	Chen Kenichi
286	July 16, 1999	Masaharu Morimoto	Yoshimi Tanigawa (谷川吉己)	Japanese	Pike eel / Gion festival	Yoshimi Tanigawa
287	July 23, 1999	Masahiko Kobe	Shōji Yamaoka (山岡昌治)	French	Jumbo mushroom	Masahiko Kobe
288	July 30, 1999	Chen Kenichi	(France) Dominique Corby	French	Foie gras	Draw
289	August 6, 1999	Chen Kenichi	(France) Dominique Corby	French	Asparagus	Draw
290	August 13, 1999	Masahiko Kobe	Hiroki Sakai (酒井博基)	Italian	Conger eel	Masahiko Kobe
291	August 20, 1999	Masaharu Morimoto	Akira Watanabe (渡辺 明)	Italian	Cuttlefish	Masaharu Morimoto
292	August 27, 1999	Hiroyuki Sakai	Yoshihide Koga (古賀義英)	French	Stingray	Hiroyuki Sakai
293	September 3, 1999	Masaharu Morimoto	Ryōzō Shigematsu (重松良三)	Japanese	Sea bass	Masaharu Morimoto
294	September 10, 1999	Chen Kenichi	Masahiko Kobe	King of Iron Chefs	Tokyo-X pork	Chen Kenichi
295	September 17, 1999	Hiroyuki Sakai	Masaharu Morimoto	King of Iron Chefs	Bell pepper	Hiroyuki Sakai
296/297	September 24, 1999	Hiroyuki Sakai	Chen Kenichi	King of Iron Chefs	Homard lobster	Hiroyuki Sakai
296/297	September 24, 1999	Hiroyuki Sakai	(France) Alain Passard	French	Longgang chicken	Hiroyuki Sakai

^59 This episode, aired in two parts, celebrated Morimoto's first anniversary as an Iron Chef. The two elder Iron Chefs Japanese were present to help Morimoto put his focus back.
^60 This is the first episode in which all four Iron Chefs appear at the same time, rather than have Kobe making a separate entrance. This was also the first episode wherein Chairman Kaga boycotted the battle due to the Iron Chefs' recent losses. Yukio Hattori did double-duty as emcee and usual color commentator for this episode.
^61 There were two different Keiji Nakazawas with two different specialties who battled two different Iron Chefs Japanese almost five years apart. The first one, a French cuisine chef, battled against Michiba, while the other one, a sushi chef, battled against Morimoto.
^62 Theme ingredients included tuna, kohada (Japanese gizzard shad), anago, eggs, and kanpyō. Also, the one-hour time limit for the battle did not include the preparation of the rice to be used for the sushi.
^63 Corby was the 300th even challenger, when separate appearances count as two. This number takes into account the challengers who battled in both parts of the 1994 and 1995 Mr. Iron Chef Specials, the 1995 Hong Kong Special, all the other aforementioned Specials (except for New Year's Eve 1996), the overtime challengers, and doesn't count Yoshinori Kojima.
^64 Both Chen and Corby were declared joint winners in the overtime battle.
^65 The final three episodes cover the King of Iron Chefs tournament which saw the Iron Chefs battle against each other. The last Iron Chef standing would then battle the last ever challenger in the show's regular run, Alain Passard.

== Specials (2000–2002) ==
Special/Overall Episode #	Original airdate	Iron Chef	Challenger	Challenger Specialty	Theme Ingredient	Winner
Millennium Cup; 298/299	January 5, 2000	Chen Kenichi	(China) Zhao Renliang (趙仁良, Chō Jinryō)	Chinese (Beijing)	Abalone	Chen Kenichi
Millennium Cup; 298/299	January 5, 2000	Rokusaburo Michiba	(France) Dominique Bouchet	French	Kobe beef	Rokusaburo Michiba
New York Special; 300	March 28, 2000	Masaharu Morimoto	(United States) Bobby Flay	Southwestern	Rock crab	Masaharu Morimoto
21st Century Battles; 301/302	January 2, 2001	Hiroyuki Sakai	Toshirō Kandagawa	Japanese	Red snapper	Toshirō Kandagawa
21st Century Battles; 301/302	January 2, 2001	Masaharu Morimoto	(United States) Bobby Flay	Southwestern	Spiny lobster	Bobby Flay
Japan Cup; 303	January 2, 2002	Chen Kenichi	Yūichirō Ebisu (胡 雄一郎)	Italian	King crab	Chen Kenichi
Japan Cup; 303	January 2, 2002	Kimio Nonaga (野永喜三夫)	Takeshi Tanabe (田辺 猛)	Japanese (Nonaga); French (Tanabe)	Pacific bluefin tuna	Kimio Nonaga
Japan Cup; 303	January 2, 2002	Chen Kenichi	Kimio Nonaga	Japanese	Ingii chicken	Kimio Nonaga

=== Specials notes ===
The Millennium Cup, occurring three months after the last regular battle, introduced two "new" Iron Chefs in the persons of Yūji Wakiya and Seigo Mitani as successors to Iron Chefs Sakai and Chen. Both actually never battled since their introduction. And while there were two battles, all four chefs involved were competing to have one of their dishes be declared as the "Millennium Dish." Although Bouchet lost his battle with Michiba, his beef main course was declared the "Millennium Dish."

The first part of the New York Special saw Iron Chefs Morimoto, Sakai, Kobe and Honorary Iron Chef Michiba visit the city. During the Iron Chefs' visit to the Zagat weekend home, Tim and Nina Zagat had arranged a battle between Morimoto and Flay. Also included in the first part were Kobe and Sakai's visit to an Asian cooking class in the Culinary Institute of America and Morimoto and Michiba's guesting in an episode of Doorknock Dinners. Gordon Elliott, the host of that show, would also serve as the English-speaking host for Flay and Morimoto's battle in the second half of the special alongside Kaga.

The 21st Century Battles were held especially to usher in the beginning of the 21st century, and brought back two previous challengers. The first was prolific guest Toshirō Kandagawa, who shaved himself bald to atone for his antagonistic role in the past. The second, Bobby Flay, was brought back to fulfill a clamor for a rematch against Morimoto as according to several reports, Flay did not take his loss very well, even complaining about the treatment against him in that battle (the show even cited a Time magazine article to bring home the point).

In the events that led to the Japan Cup, Chairman Kaga (the character) had died due to puffer fish liver poisoning. A memorial service was held before the new chairman, Kaga's equally flamboyant nephew, played by actor Masahiro Motoki was introduced. The Japan Cup, launched to keep the tradition of Kitchen Stadium alive, held and recorded at the Tokyo Big Sight. Chen was chosen to represent Chinese cuisine while the selection of representatives for French, Italian, and Japanese cuisines was opened to "unknown nameless chefs." There were only two battles that were covered in full: Chen's semifinal battle and finals between Chen and Nonaga, only highlights of Nonaga's semifinal battle were shown due to time constraints. Takeshi Kaga, the actor portraying the character Chairman Kaga, was still alive at the time of the Japan Cup (and still is as of 2026, according to IMDb), his character was killed off due to commitments he had at the time that prevented him from reprising his role. The story element of the "death" of Kaga's character was ignored in Iron Chef America: Battle of the Masters, as according to that show's storyline, it was Chairman Kaga himself who sent Sakai and Morimoto to America to grace the opening of a new Gourmet Academy there.

== Revival series (2012–2013) ==
On October 26, 2012, Fuji TV revived the original Iron Chef franchise, this time simply using the English name Iron Chef (アイアンシェフ). Actor Hiroshi Tamaki assumed the role as the new Chairman in this revival. For the line-up of Iron Chefs, Yuji Wakiya became the official Iron Chef Chinese, while Yōsuke Suga was selected as the new Iron Chef French instead of Seigo Mitani; Jun Kurogi was chosen as the new Iron Chef Japanese. Yukio Hattori would reprise his role as commenter, guided by a set of culinary experts.

Unlike the previous series, the 2012 revival had challengers nominated by prominent personalities, such as past Iron Chefs. Through public vote, challengers who won battles would have a chance to officially become future Iron Chefs.

For consistency, all Japanese names are in Western order, macroned with Hepburn romanization. All other East Asian names, on the other hand, are in Eastern order. Also, for each of the non-Japanese East Asian challengers, as much as possible, the romanization used for the Chinese names are derived from the Mandarin Chinese pronunciation and Pinyin romanization of the name.

All East Asian challengers, except those with Wikipedia articles, have their names in kanji in parentheses upon first mention in the list. For the non-Japanese Asian challengers, the Japanese pronunciation of the name as used in the show is also included.

In the case of East Asians with mixed Chinese-Japanese heritage, such as Chen Kenichi, they follow the same criteria as the Chinese names (i.e. Eastern order and Japanese pronunciation guide beside kanji).

=== 2012 ===
Revival episode #	Original airdate	Iron Chef	Nominee	Nominee Specialty	Theme Ingredient	Winner	Final Score
1	October 26, 2012	Yōsuke Suga	Ken'ichi Miyanaga (宮永賢一)	Japanese	Salmon	Yōsuke Suga	88.5 - 83
1	October 26, 2012	Yuji Wakiya	Chen Kentarō (陳建太郎, Chin Kentarō)	Chinese	Okinawan pig	Yuji Wakiya	98 - 85
2	November 2, 2012	Jun Kurogi	Katsuyasu Itō (伊藤勝康)	French	Japanese lobster	Katsuyasu Itō	84 - 86
3	November 9, 2012	Yōsuke Suga	Mitsuaki Okamura (岡村光晃)	Italian	Mushroom	Yōsuke Suga	93 - 75
4	November 23, 2012	Yōsuke Suga	Isato Nakano (中野勇人)	Chinese	Tofu	Yōsuke Suga	95.5 - 80
4	November 23, 2012	Yuji Wakiya	Toshiyuki Kudō (工藤敏之)	French	Pacific cod	Yuji Wakiya	91.5 - 83
5	November 30, 2012	Yuji Wakiya	Seiichi Honda (本多誠一)	Spanish	Potato	Yuji Wakiya	90.5 - 76
6	December 7, 2012	Jun Kurogi	Yūsuke Kawasaki (川崎祐介)	European	Native chicken	Jun Kurogi	99 - 89

The last episode of 2012 is the New Year's Eve episode as the Mr. Iron Chef competition. It was broadcast live for six hours and there were seven judges for each battle. It was broadcast as alternative programming to NHK's hugely popular Kōhaku Uta Gassen.

Overall Episode #	Original airdate	Resident Iron Chef	Guest Iron Chef	Speciality	Theme Ingredient	Winner	Final Score
Omisoka Special (7)	December 31, 2012	Yōsuke Suga	(Thailand) Ian Chalermkittichai	French (Iron Chef Thailand's Iron Chef Western)	Spiny lobster	Yōsuke Suga	128 - 114
Omisoka Special (7)	December 31, 2012	Jun Kurogi	(Japan) Rokusaburo Michiba	Japanese (Honorary Iron Chef Japanese)	Japanese amberjack	Rokusaburo Michiba	122 - 125
Omisoka Special (7)	December 31, 2012	Yuji Wakiya	(United States) Masaharu Morimoto	Japanese (Honorary Iron Chef Japanese / Currently of Iron Chef America)	Apple	Yuji Wakiya	132 - 125

=== 2013 ===
Overall Episode #	Original airdate	Iron Chef	Nominee	Nominee Specialty	Theme Ingredient	Winner	Final Score
8	January 18, 2013	Jun Kurogi	Kazuhide Nose (能勢和秀)	French	Cheese	Jun Kurogi	85 - 75.5
9	January 25, 2013	Yuji Wakiya	Tsuneyuki Hamada (浜田統之)	Japanese	Beef	Yuji Wakiya	85.5 - 80.5
10	February 15, 2013	Yuji Wakiya	Hiromi Yamada	Italian	Cabbage	Hiromi Yamada	91 - 94
11	February 22, 2013	Yōsuke Suga	Hideki Irie (入江瑛起)	Japanese	Scallop	Yōsuke Suga	90 - 82
12	March 1, 2013	Yōsuke Suga	Toshihiko Yoroizuka (鎧塚俊彦)	Pastry	Strawberry	Toshihiko Yoroizuka	90 - 93
13	March 22, 2013	Jun Kurogi	Takemasa Kinoshita (木下威征)	French	Bamboo shoot	Jun Kurogi	88 - 83

Overall Episode #	Original airdate	Japan	USA	Speciality	Theme Ingredient	Winner	Final Score
World Cup Special (14)	July 4, 2013	(Japan) Yōsuke Suga	(United States) Tony Maws	Iron Chef	Beef	(United States) Tony Maws	1 point
World Cup Special (14)	July 4, 2013	(Japan) Jun Kurogi	(United States) Frank A. Ruta	Iron Chef	Beef	(Japan) Jun Kurogi	1 point
World Cup Special (14)	July 4, 2013	(Japan) Yuji Wakiya	(United States) Eric Ziebold	Iron Chef	Beef	(United States) Eric Ziebold	1 point
World Cup Special (14)	July 4, 2013	Team Japan	(United States) Team USA	Iron Chef	Beef	Team Japan	2 point
