= Tokyo-X =

Breed of pig

- Country of origin: Japan

Traits

Tokyo-X is a Japanese breed of domestic pig, bred for high quality pork production. It is unusual for its marbled meat, rarely seen in pork.

The Tokyo-X breeding effort was started in 1990 by the Tokyo Metropolitan Livestock Experiment Station, combining bloodlines from the Duroc (US), Berkshire (UK), and Beijing Black (China) breeds. Five generations of breeding and selection ended in 1997 when the breed went to market.

Tokyo-X was also featured on the Japanese television program Iron Chef, where the cooks had to use it as an ingredient in each of their dishes.
