= Eiga.com =

Japanese movie information website

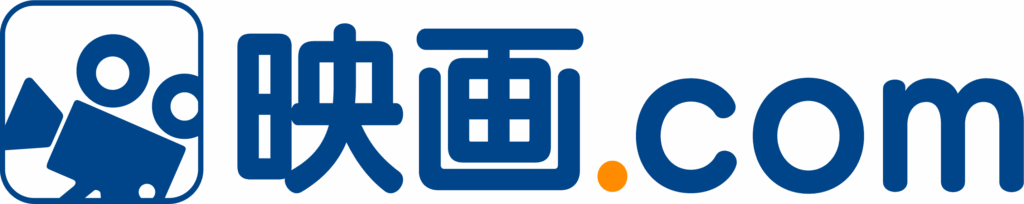

- Screenshot of the website's home page in April 2026
- Native name: 映画.com
- Romanized name: eiga dotto komu
- Website type: Movie information website
- Available in: Japanese
- Traded as: Eiga K.K.
- Founded: August 1998
- Headquarters: 1-9-1 Higashi-Shinbashi, Minato-ku, Tokyo, Japan
- Area served: Japan
- Editor: Fumitaka Otsuka
- President: Takeyuki Inoue
- CEO: Takeyuki Inoue
- Industry: Entertainment
- Revenue: ¥430 million (US$3.92 million) (FY 2024)
- Parent: Genta K.K.
- Website: eiga.com
- Advertising: yes
- Commercial: yes
- Registration: optional
- Users: 20 million (2025)
- Launched: May 27, 1998; 28 years ago
- Current status: active

Eiga.com (Japanese: 映画.com, Hepburn: Eiga dotto komu; lit. 'Movie.com') is a Japanese movie information website founded in August 1998. It is one of the largest movie information websites in Japan.

== Overview ==
The site's domain was registered on May 27, 1998, though the website was founded in August 1998. Eiga.com started as an independent movie information site sending emails through an email list, acting as a free electronic bi-weekly magazine. Kakaku.com acquired 70% of the website on February 20, 2007 and made it a subsidiary of the company on April 1. On July 23, 2025, Kakaku.com sold all shares to Genda kabushiki gaisha.

Anime Hack logo

Eiga.com features movie information such news, reviews by professional critics and the editorial department, user ratings and review posts, and user-generated word-of-mouth information about movies. In July 2015, the website added a feature called "check-in" that allows users to add "favorites" and create a "favorite page" in their accounts. Additionally, the website also launches Anime Hack (アニメハック) in cooperation with "Tokyo Anime News", which provides information about Japanese animes such as news, information on anime productions, voice actors, and theatrical information such as television schedules.

CNET Japan reported in 2007 that the website was receiving over 250,000 monthly visitors and that it had been one of the largest independent sites before being acquired by Kakaku.com. By 2025, the website received 100 million monthly views and more than 20 million unique monthly users. The websites generated ¥430 million (US$3.92 million) in revenue during the fiscal year 2024.

An April Fools' joke by the website in 2016 featured parody teaser posters of the 2015 film The Martian with pictures and captions of various characters such as Sadako from the The Ring. They also produced posters mocking Donald Trump and Hirotada Ototake, who were in the news for running in the 2016 United States presidential election and for allegedly having an affair with five women respectively, with the captions "7 billion people want him to lose the election" (70億人が彼の落選を願っている) and "7 billion people were astonished by his incredible stamina" (70億人が彼の絶倫にびっくりぽん). The joke was later taken down, and the website issued an apology. The website issued a further apology after they overbooked the preview of the film Mufasa: The Lion King.

The website operated a mini theatre called "Eiga.com Cinema" in Atsugi, Kanagawa Prefecture in collaboration with the city between April 26, 2014 and November 9, 2018. The current editor-in-chief of the website since February 2026 is Fumitaka Otsuka.

== See also ==
- List of online databases
