= Tabelog =

Publisher of restaurant reviews

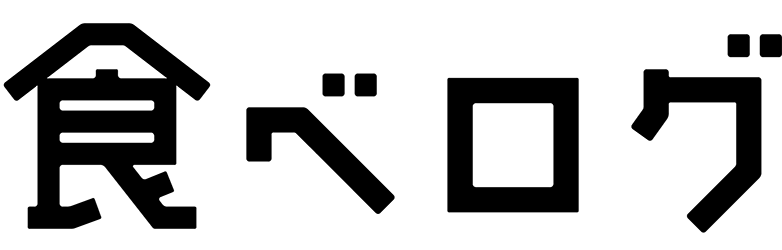
Tabelog logo

Tabelog (食べログ; portmanteau of "食べる", "eat", and "log") is the largest publisher of restaurant reviews in Japan. It is operated by Kakaku.com. The website crowdsources ratings and reviews from anonymous reviewers and grades restaurants on a five-star scale. In 2023, the website launched a ChatGPT plugin to allow ChatGPT Plus users to search for restaurants, becoming the first Japanese developer to launch a plugin for the chatbot.
