= Nishi-Azabu =

Neighborhood in Minato-ku, Tokyo

Coordinates: 35.6597°N 139.7234°E

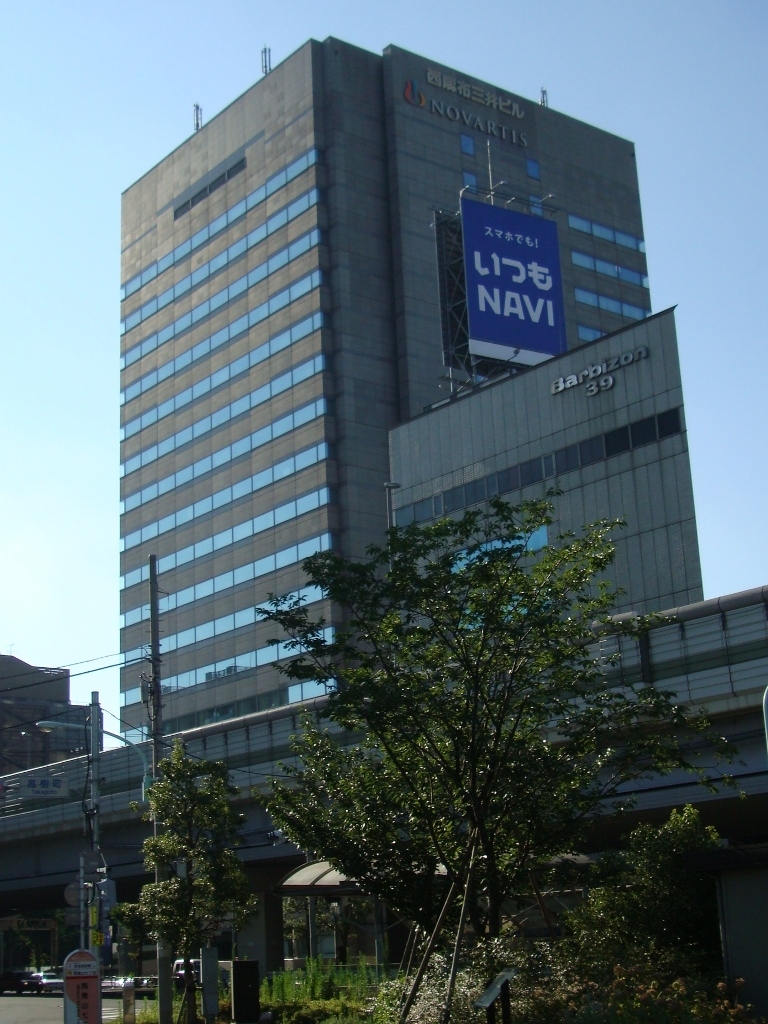
Nishi-azabu Mitsui Building, viewed from Takagichō intersection at Kottō-dori (Kottō street, in 6 Minami-Aoyama).

Nishi-Azabu (西麻布) is a district of Minato, Tokyo, Japan, which was a part of the former Azabu Ward.

Nishiazabu is bordered by Minami-Aoyama on the north and west, Hiroo (Shibuya) on the south, Moto-Azabu on the southeast, and Roppongi on the northeast.

The Fujifilm company is located in 2 Nishi-Azabu. A large area in 4 Nishi-Azabu surrounding the Nishi-Azabu Mitsui building and the Wakabakai kindergarten was occupied by the Mitsui clan (Mitsui Zaibatsu) before World War II.

The embassies of Portugal, Yemen, Ukraine, Uruguay, Ecuador, El Salvador, Ghana, Greece, Guatemala, Costa Rica, Dominican Republic, Nicaragua, Haiti, Panama, Venezuela, Belize, Bolivia, Honduras, Laos and Romania are located in this area.

It is also home to a number of international kindergartens as well as Kogai Elementary School.

Chōkoku-ji (長谷寺), also known as Azabu Ō-Kannon (麻布大観音), is a Sōtō-shū temple and a tourist attraction and is also located in Nishi-Azabu.

== Education ==
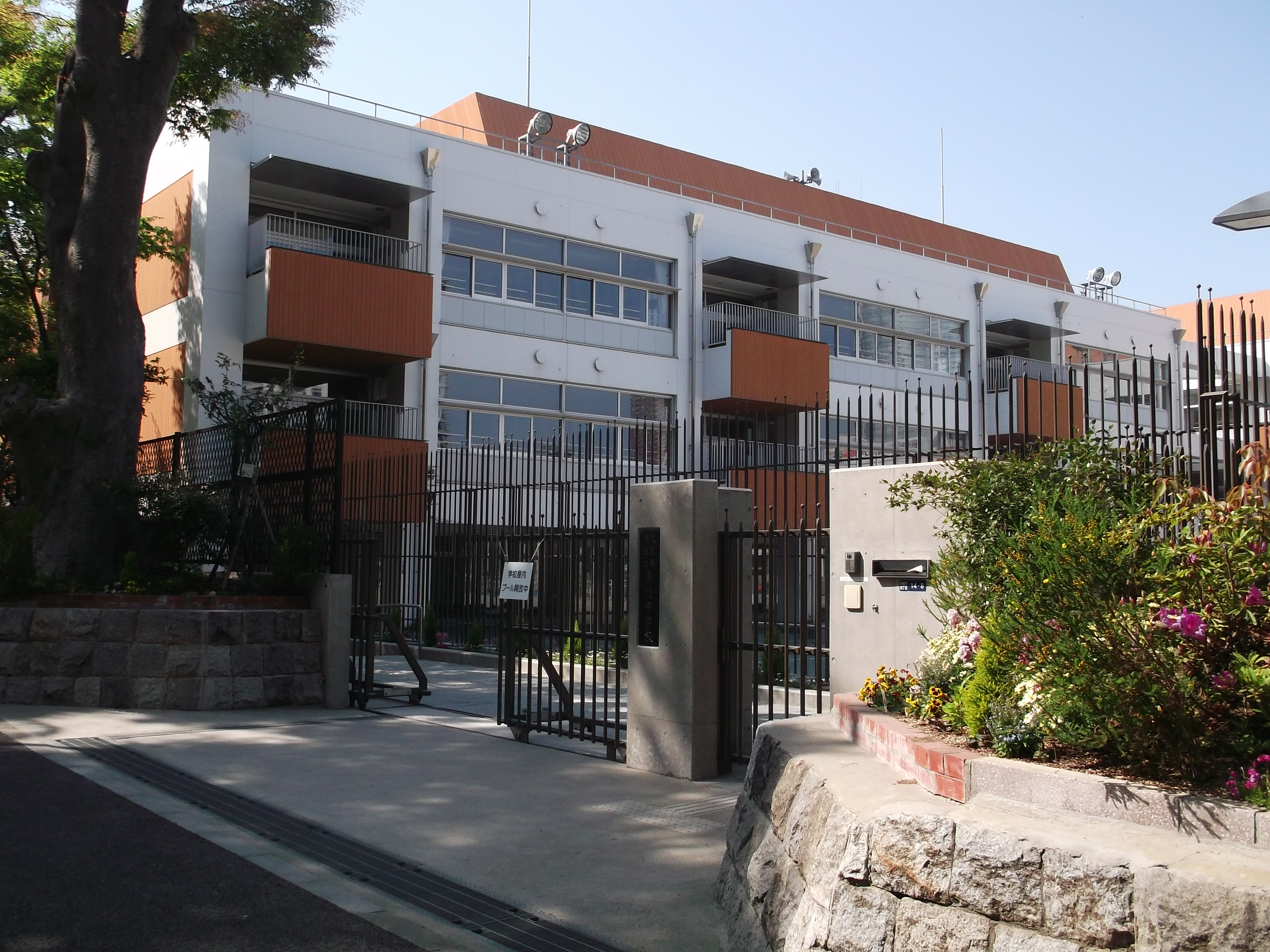
Kōryō Junior High School (高陵中学校)

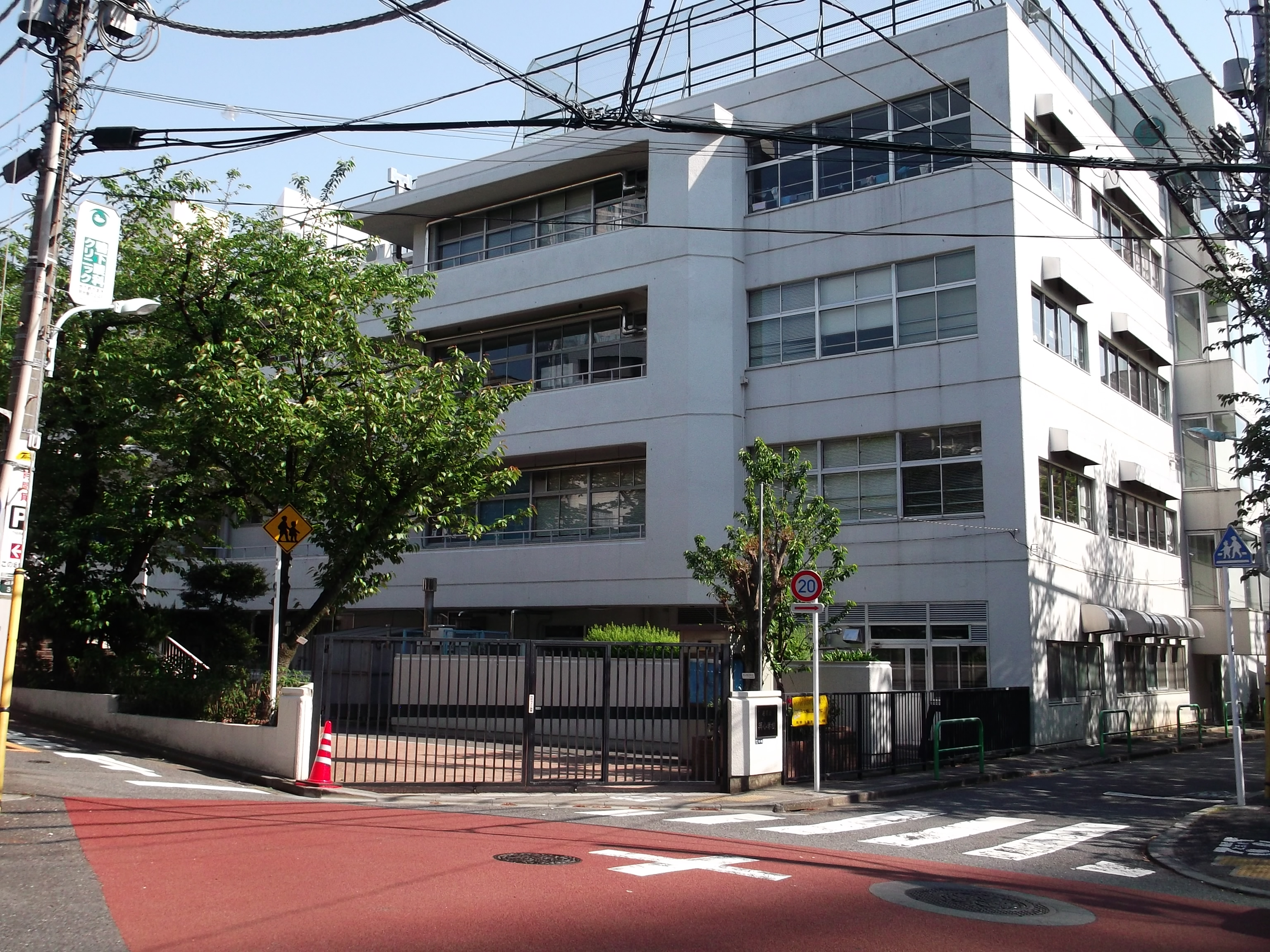
Kōgai Elementary School (笄小学校)

Minato City Board of Education operates public elementary and junior high schools.

Nishi-Azabu 1 and 3-4-chōme, and 2-chome 1-17 ban and 20-26 ban are zoned to Kōgai Elementary School (笄小学校) and Kōryō Junior High School (高陵中学校). Nishi-Azabu 2-chōme 18-19 ban are zoned to Seinan Elementary School (青南小学校) and Aoyama Junior High School (青山中学校).

== Gallery ==
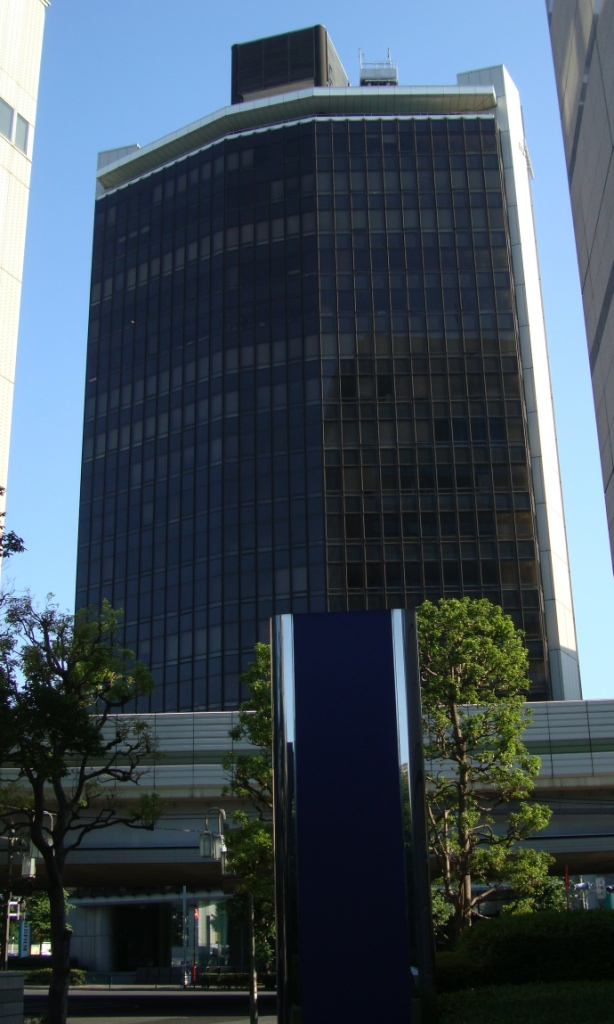
Fujifilm HQ in 2 Nishi-Azabu, viewed from Nishi-Azabu Mitsui bldg, over the Roppongi-dori (Roppongi street). .

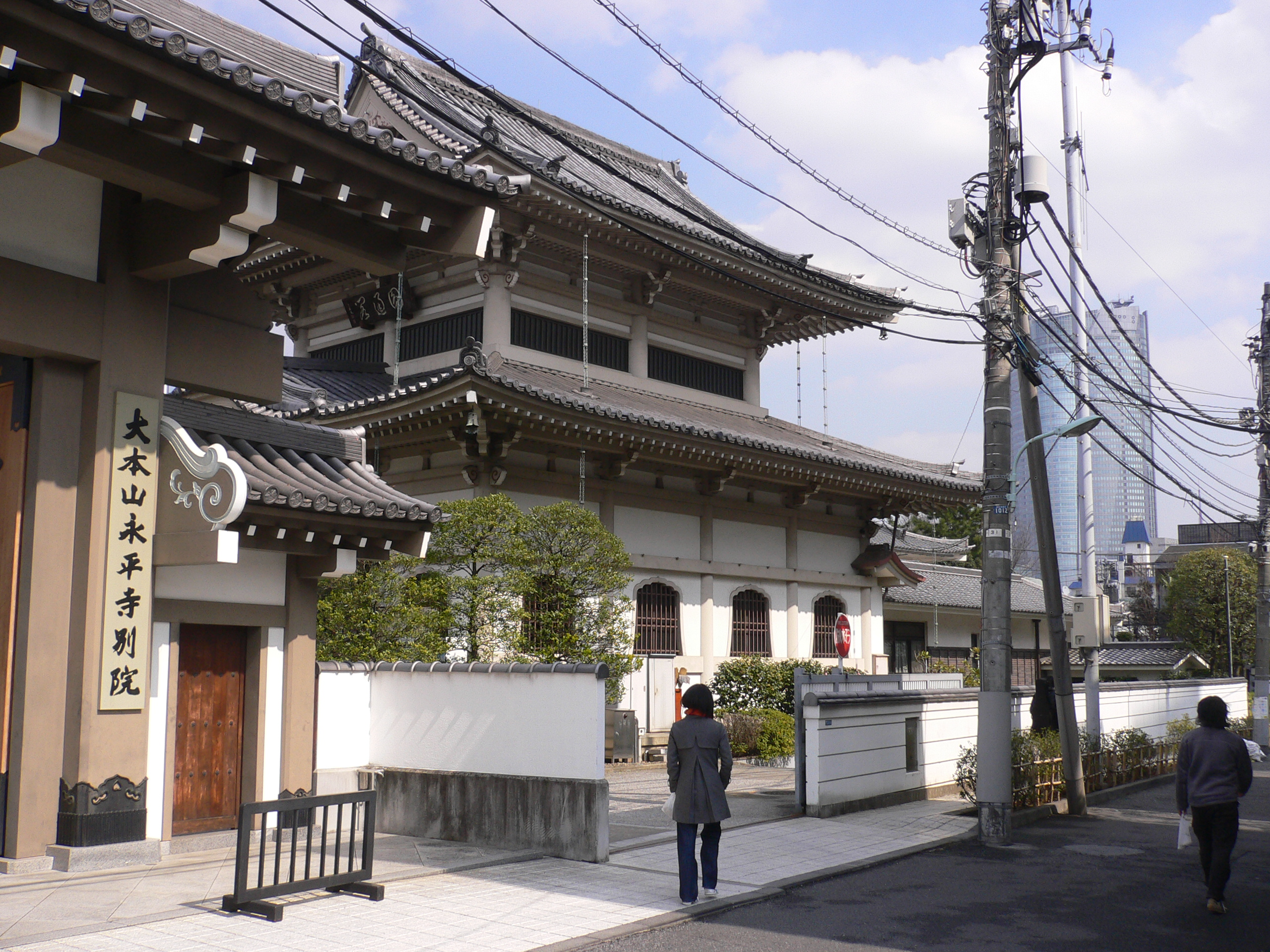
Chōkoku-ji in 2 Nishi-Azabu

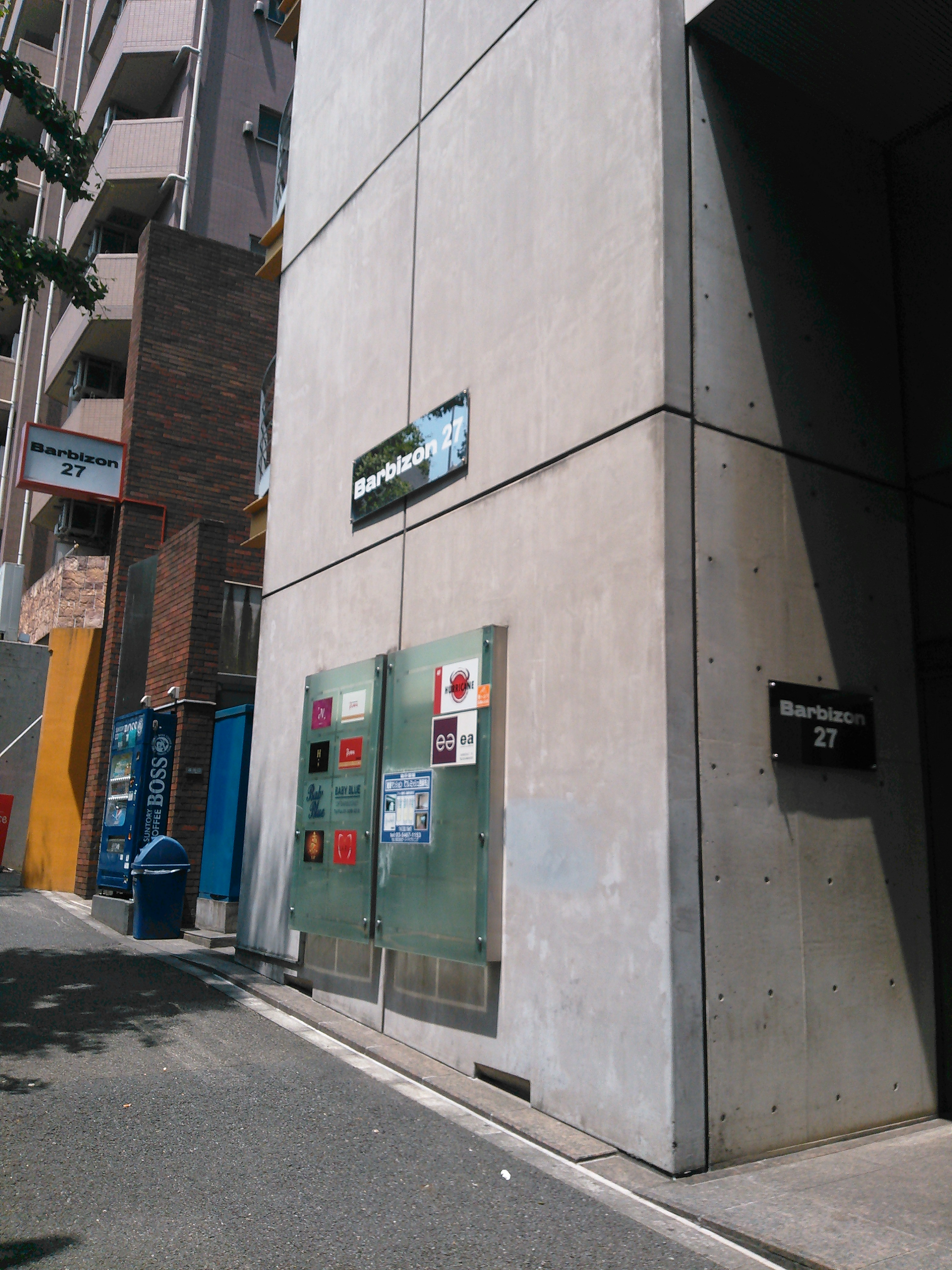
A building at Roppongi-dori (Roppongi street) in 2 Nishi-Azabu.

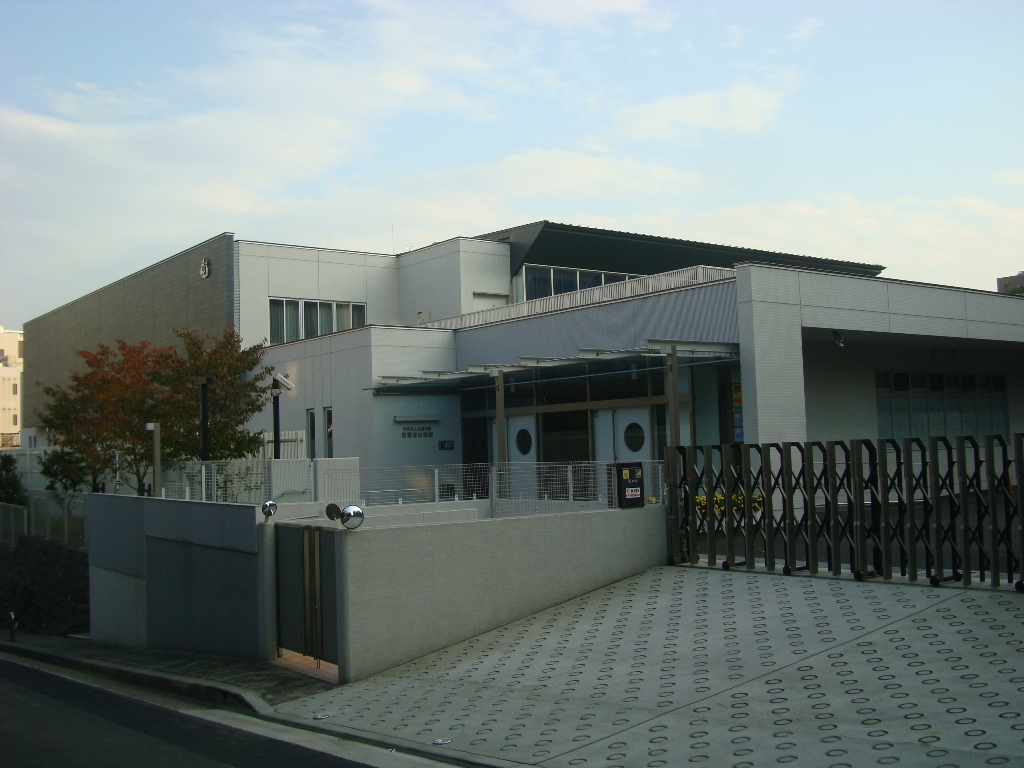
Wakabakai Kindergarten in 4 Nishi-Azabu.

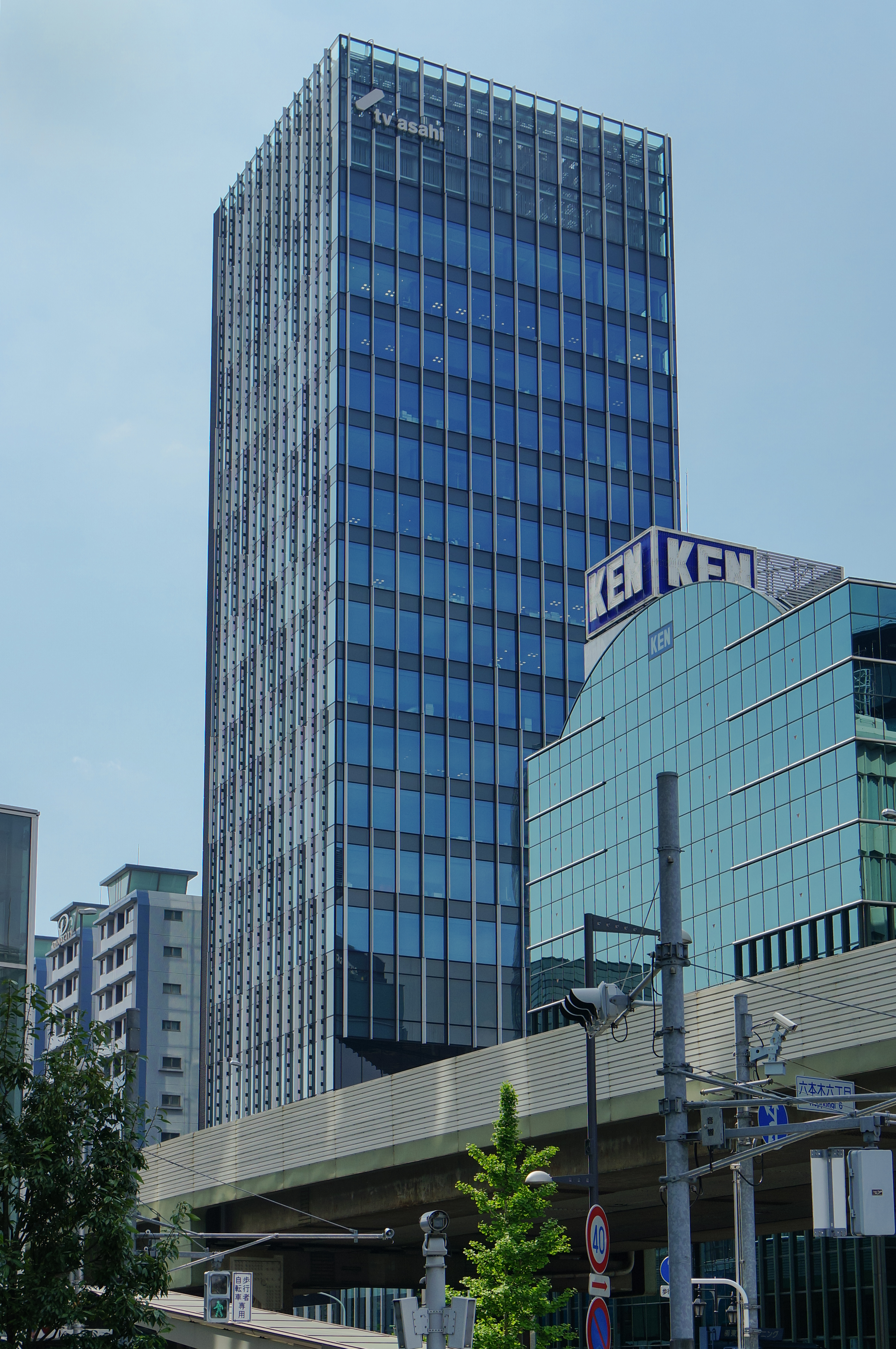
TV Asahi EX Tower in 1 Nishi-Azabu neighboring Roppongi, viewed from Roppongi Hills, over the Roppongi-dori (Roppongi street).
