= Masahiro Kobayashi (director) =

Japanese film director (1954–2022)

- 小林 政広
- Born: January 6, 1954; Tokyo, Japan
- Died: August 20, 2022 (aged 68)
- Occupation: Film director

Masahiro Kobayashi (小林 政広, Kobayashi Masahiro; January 6, 1954 – August 20, 2022) was a Japanese film director.

== Career ==
Kobayashi became the first Japanese filmmaker to win the Grand Prize at the Yubari International Fantastic Film Festival. In its wake, he founded Monkey Town Productions and made three films back to back which won prizes in three consecutive years at Cannes: Kaizokuban Bootleg Film (1999) and Man Walking on Snow (2001) in Un Certain Regard and Koroshi (2000) in the Directors' Fortnight. Bashing was screened at the 2005 Cannes Film Festival. "Amazing Story" (2003), "The Rebirth" (2007) and "Where are you?" (2009) were invited in competition to Festival del film Locarno. "The Rebirth" won four prizes at the 60th Festival del film Locarno prizes, including the Golden Leopard and the Daniel Schmid award. In 2008, International Film Festival Rotterdam, Festival do Rio and the Buenos Aires International Film Festival hosted a retrospective of his films to great acclaim. Kobayashi makes out of as many as 16 feature films that are mostly written and produced by himself.

== Filmography ==
- Closing Time (1996)
- Kaizokuban Bootleg Film (1999)
- Film Noir (2000)
- Man Walking on Snow (2001)
- Perfect Blue: Yume Nara Samete (2002) (writer)
- Amazing Story (2003)
- Déracine (2004) (writer)
- Flic (2005)
- Bashing (2005)
- The Rebirth (2007)
- The Happiness (2008)
- White Night (2009)
- Wakaranai: Where Are You? (2009)
- Haru's Journey (2010)
- Women on the Edge (2011)
- Japan's Tragedy (2012)
- Strangers When We Meet (2013)
- Lear on the Shore (2016)

== Substance use ==
- Kobayashi was a heavy smoker who smoked upwards of two packs a day. When entering Austria in 2007 to participate in the Vienna International Film Festival, customs officials informed him that bringing in a quantity of tobacco exceeding the customs limit would be punished with a fine. In January 2008, [he] smoked in a hotel's non-smoking room, which he was staying in to participate in the Rotterdam International Film Festival, and paid a fine of 175 euro, subsequently moving to another hotel.
- In his autobiography "Diary of a Film Director: Masahiro Kobayashi", he has confessed to drinking every day since the age of 32 and developing alcohol addiction six months in. However, he states he does not wish to quit smoking.
