= Minami-Aoyama =

Minami-Aoyama 南青山
- District
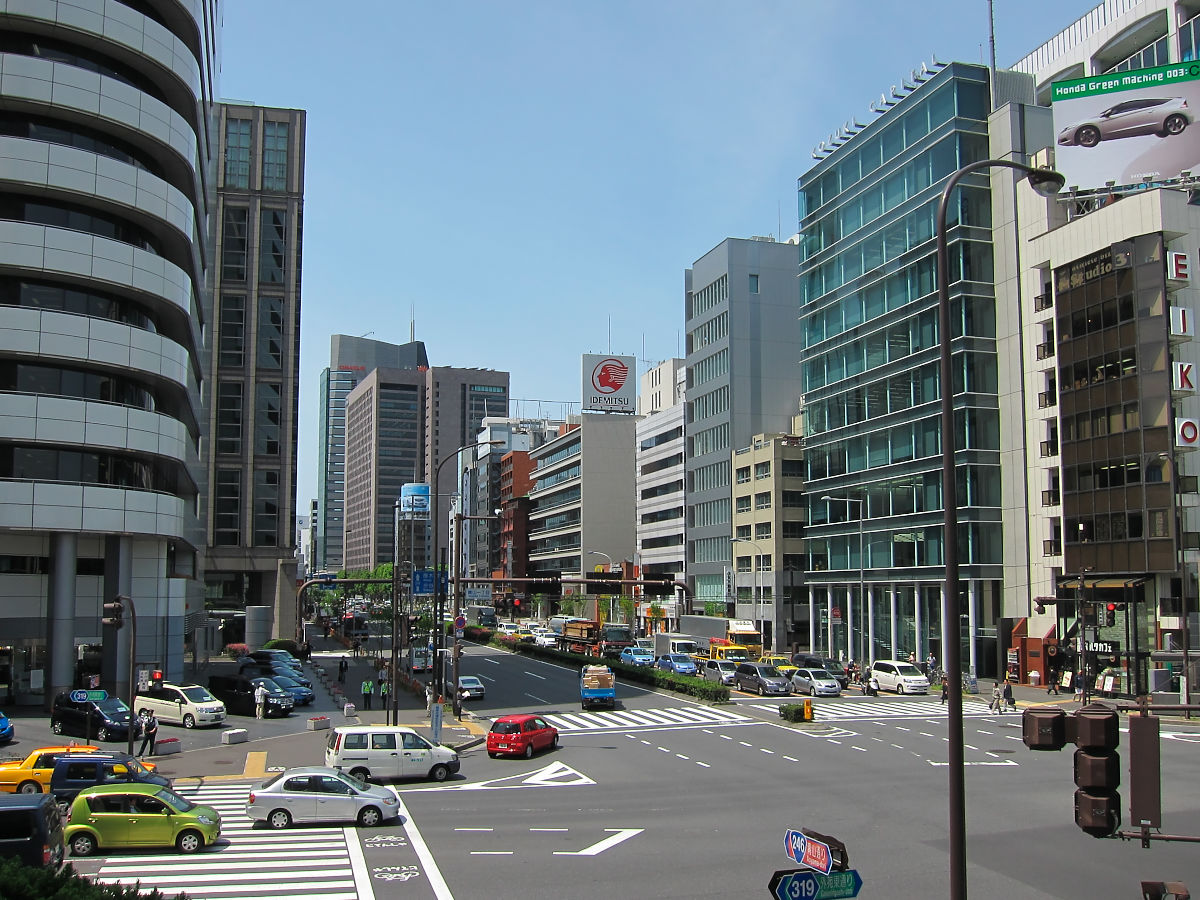

- Location of Minami-Aoyama within Tokyo Location of Minami-Aoyama within Tokyo Bay
- Coordinates: 35°39′55.0″N 139°42′54″E
- Country: Japan
- City: Tokyo
- Ward: Minato

Area
  - Total: 1.37 km^{2} (0.53 sq mi)

Population (August 1, 2019)
  - Total: 15,177
  - Density: 11,100/km^{2} (28,700/sq mi)
- Time zone: UTC+9 (JST)
- Postal code: 107-0061
- Area code: 03

Minami-Aoyama (南青山, Minamiaoyama) is a district of Minato, Tokyo, Japan. Its name means "South Aoyama" and its counterpart to the North is Kita-Aoyama.

== Education ==
Minato City Board of Education operates public elementary and junior high schools.

Minami-Aoyama 1-chōme 1-12 ban, 2-chōme, 3-chōme 1-4-ban, and 4-chōme 1-9 ban are zoned to Aoyama Elementary School (青山小学校). 3-chōme 5-18-ban, 4-chōme 10-28-ban, and 5-7-chōme are zoned to Seinan Elementary School (青南小学校). Areas zoned to Aoyama and Seinan elementaries are zoned to Aoyama Junior High School (青山中学校). 1-chōme 13-26-ban are zoned to Akasaka Elementary School (赤坂小学校) and Akasaka Junior High School (赤坂中学校).

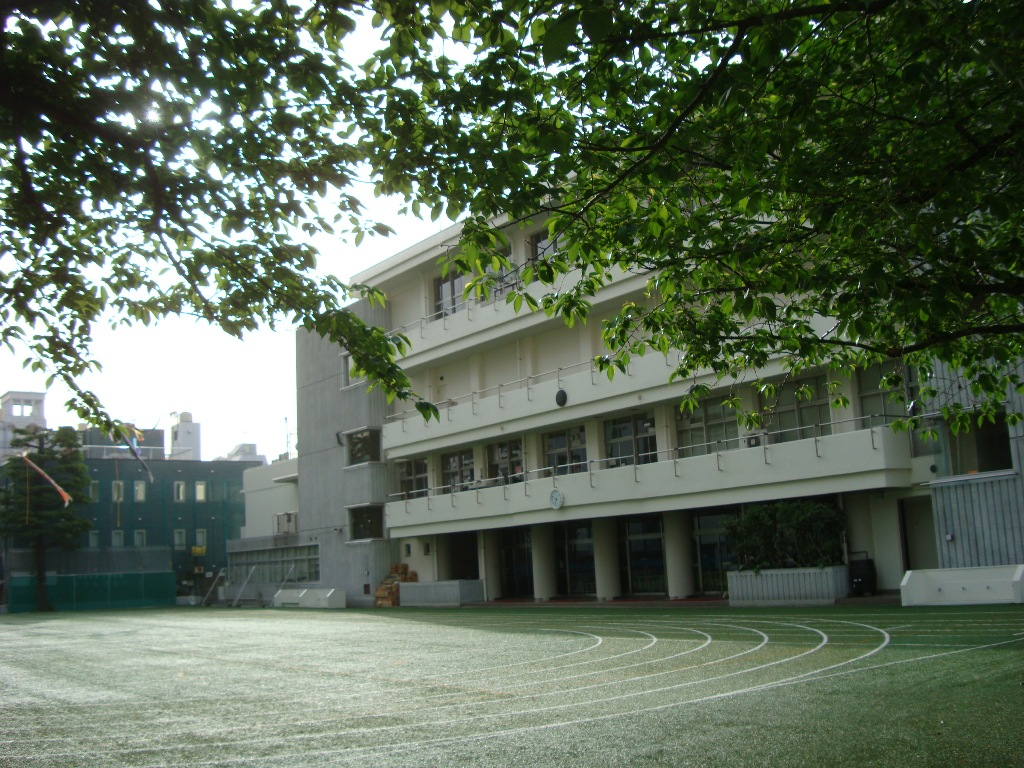
Aoyama Elementary School (青山小学校)

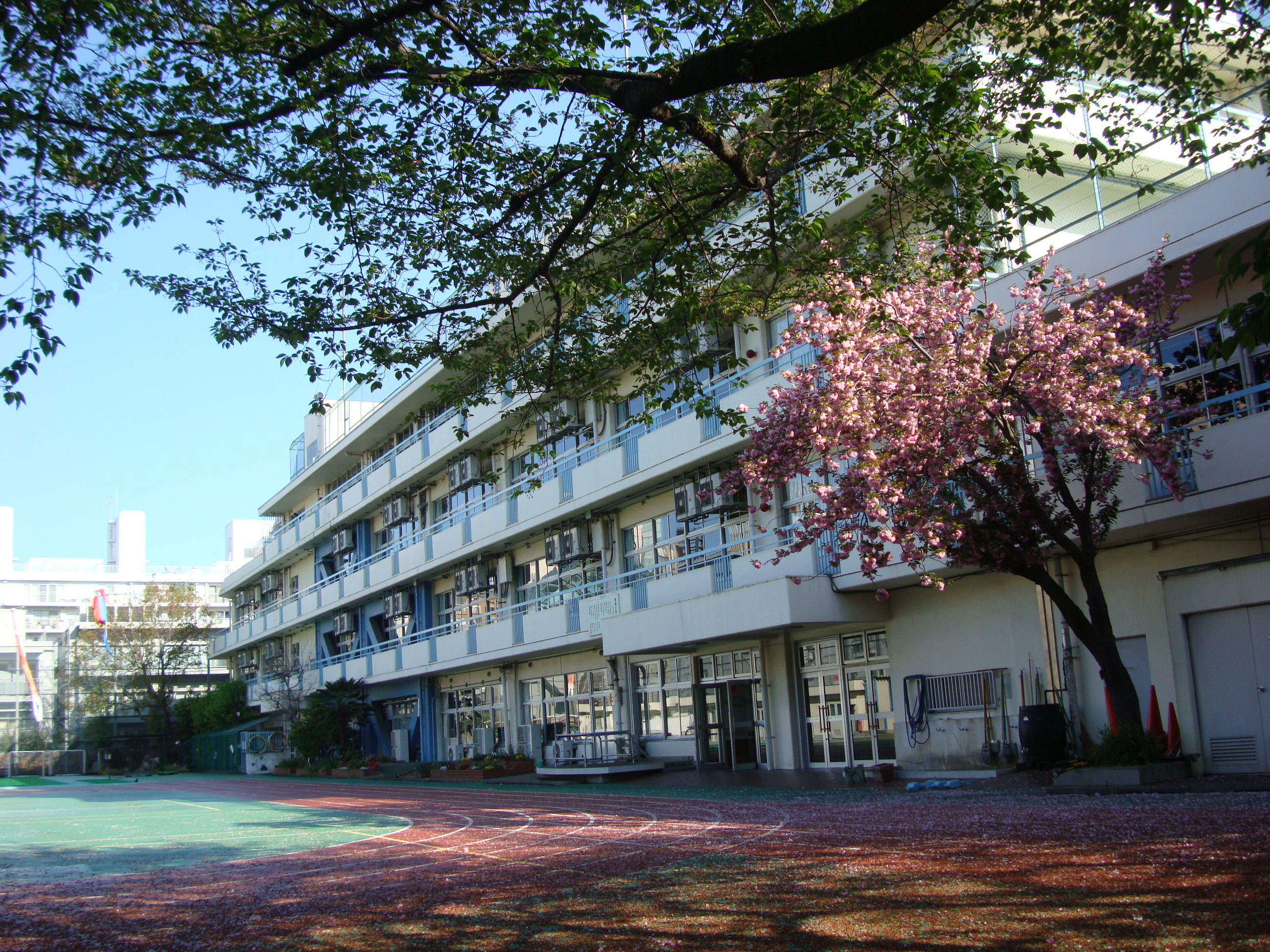
Seinan Elementary School (青南小学校)
