= Blue Imagine =

- Directed by: Urara Matsubayashi
- Written by: Minami Goto
- Produced by: Urara Matsubayashi; Minami Goto
- Starring: Mayu Yamaguchi; Asuka Kawatoko; Yui Kitamura; Yuzumi Shintani; Iana Bernardez; Urara Matsubayashi; Nanami Hidaka; Yuta Hayashi; Makoto Shinada; Yuya Matsuura; Shinsuke Kato; Kana Nakano; Oto Takeuchi; Stefanie Arianne; Hirobumi Watanabe; Yoshihiko Hosoda
- Cinematography: Isao Ishii
- Edited by: Tomomi Kikuchi
- Music by: Yuji Watanabe
- Production company: Cobalt Pictures
- Distributed by: Cobalt Pictures
- Release date: 16 March 2024
- Running time: 93 minutes
- Country: Japan
- Languages: Japanese; Tagalog; English

Blue Imagine (Japanese: ブルーイマジン) is a 2024 Japanese drama film directed by Urara Matsubayashi, starring Mayu Yamaguchi, Asuka Kawatoko and Yui Kitamura. Matsubayashi's directorial debut, it follows an actress, who comes to a safe house for women have been sexually abused, the titular restaurant and communal living space, after she is assaulted by a prominent director. The film is partly based on Matsubayashi's own experiences.

== Cast ==
- Mayu Yamaguchi as Noel
- Asuka Kawatoko as Kayo
- Yui Kitamura as Yurina
- Yuzumi Shintani
- Iana Bernardez as Jessica
- Urara Matsubayashi
- Nanami Hidaka as Hachimi
- Yuta Hayashi
- Makoto Shinada as Director Tagawa
- Yuya Matsuura as Uemoto
- Shinsuke Kato
- Kana Nakano
- Oto Takeuchi
- Stefanie Arianne as Irene
- Hirobumi Watanabe
- Yoshihiko Hosoda as Shunta
- Shuna Iijima as Amane Yamanaka
- Ria Miyanagi

== Production ==
Work on the project, which was actress Urara Matsubayashi's directorial debut, started in 2022. The film's "starting point" was her own experiences in the Japanese entertainment industry. Matsubayashi had previously appeared in the films The Hungry Lion and Kamata Prelude, both of which dealt with the topic of sexual abuse. She was also a producer on the latter. While attending the Tokyo Filmex film festival, she met Minami Goto, whom she decided to offer the role of screenwriter and fellow producer. Matsubayashi initially planned for the film to be a biography of Itō Noe, though she eventually decided on a modern-day setting.

Matsubayashi had Goto interview her on her time in the industry for the film. Goto also did her own research on the subject by reading many accounts of sexual abuse. In writing the screenplay, she and Goto chose to focus on a variety of issues from beyond sexual abuse and the entertainment industry, such as discrimination against Filipino women in Japan and sexual abuse against men. As such, she chose to introduce characters at the safe house who were not involved in the entertainment industry and who had not experienced sexual abuse, as she "didn't want to show only one victim's point of view." However, they eventually decided against including scenes depicting acts of sexual violence as she felt that it would be unnecessary given that the film's focus was instead on the suffering caused by the violence. Matsubayashi also wanted to "portray camaraderie between women, and show how #MeToo is not restricted to one country, but the entire world." Despite dealing with serious themes, Goto did not wanted the film to end on a hopeful note, believing that it would be too "painful" to watch otherwise.

Many of the male actors who Matsubayashi approached refused to appear in the film as they believed that the film would be difficult to promote due to her involvement, Eventually, she offered the role of the director to Makoto Shinada, her co-star in The Hungry Lion, who accepted the offer. She also approached cinematographer Isao Ishii and lighting specialist Akio Osaka, who had worked on her debut film 1+1=11, to work on this film. In preparation for the role, lead actress Mayu Yamaguchi reportedly "read many articles and watched many documentaries" on the topic of sexual abuse, which caused her "great distress". Matsubayashi told her not to portray Noel as a "victim" but rather a "human being". The safe house scenes were filmed at the Ryozan Park co-living space in the Sugamo neighbourhood of Tokyo. Mastubayashi decided to set the film in the neighbourhood as it was where the founders of the feminist literary magazine Seitō gathered.

== Release ==
The film premiered at the International Film Festival Rotterdam under the "Bright Future" section, held in the Netherlands in late January 2024. It then screened at the 19th Osaka Asian Film Festival under the "Indie Forum" section in early March, where it won the JAPAN CUTS Award Special Mention. The film opened in theatres across Japan on 16 March.

== Reception ==
Yuki Saruwatari of Cinema Today rated the film 5 stars out of 5, calling it "empowering" and a "masterpiece". She opined that the film "sharply and realistically" addresses serious themes whilst maintaining its sensitivity. Hideyuki Nakazawa, also of Cinema Today, rated the film 4 stars out of 5, calling it "powerful". He noted that the script and the direction are "too straightforward" at times, though admitted that that is also "part of the film's appeal." Olivier Thibodeau of Panorama-Cinéma called the film "painful" yet "uplifting". He wrote that the film's climax, in which Noel confronts the director, was "particularly liberating".

Bavner Donaldo of Cinejour rated the film 2.9 stars out of 5 and wrote that he initially felt that the film was "mediocre" and "lacking any commendable artistic merit." However, he praised the climax, considering it a "fitting" way to end the film.
