= Andreas Larsson =

Andreas Larsson may refer to:

- Andreas Larsson (handballer)
- Andreas Larsson (sommelier)
