= Saga Saga =

- Directed by: Aimi Natsuto
- Written by: Aimi Natsuto
- Produced by: Tōru Emori; Haruka Sugiyama
- Starring: Rena Matsui; Sae Okazaki; Sara Kurashima; Naoya Kusakawa; Noa Kawazoe; Urara Matsubayashi; Yuta Hayashi; Shinsuke Kato; Asuka Kurosawa
- Cinematography: Ryo Muramatsu
- Music by: Yuji Watanabe
- Distributed by: Stardust Pictures
- Release date: 1 September 2023
- Running time: 115 minutes
- Country: Japan
- Language: Japanese

Saga Saga (Japanese: 緑のざわめき) is a 2023 Japanese drama film directed by Aimi Natsuto, starring Rena Matsui, Sae Okazaki and Sara Kurashima. It follows an actress who quits her acting career in Tokyo and returns to her hometown on Kyushu, where she reunites with her two half-sisters.

== Cast ==
- Rena Matsui as Kyoko Oyamada
- Sae Okazaki as Naoko Motohashi
- Sara Kurashima as Anna Kogure
- Naoya Kusakawa as Soutaro
- Noa Kawazoe as Eri
- Urara Matsubayashi as Honami
- Yuta Hayashi as Tooru
- Shinsuke Kato as Elder Koga
- Asuka Kurosawa as Fumiko
- Kato Saki as Mayu
- Rikako Watanabe as Ayano

== Production ==
After making her feature film debut with the comedy Jeux de Plage, director Aimi Natsuto wanted to direct another film, this time inspired by the works of Japanese writers Kenzaburō Ōe and Kenji Nakagami. Other influences included South American writers Gabriel García Márquez and Mario Vargas Llosa. She decided on having sisters as the main characters as she wished to "tell a women's story", as well as to "depict female solidarity". She made the film's protagonist an actress due to her own background in acting.

Natsuto planned to set the film in Kyushu, her hometown. After touring Kyushu, she decided on Saga Prefecture as the setting as the Camphor trees in the area reminded her of Ōe's depictions of the forests on Shikoku. Additionally, ßa member of the Saga Prefecture Film Commission had shown her various potential shooting locations in the area which she felt "looked great". Like her previous film, she initially planned for the film to revolve around a 'girls' night-out'. The first draft of the screenplay featured two main characters, half-sisters Kyoko and Naoko, with Naoko stalking Kyoko, who is on a 'girl's night out'. This was inspired by Natsuko Imamura's novel The Woman in the Purple Skirt, which had led to Natsuto's interest in the psychology of stalkers. Eventually, she introduced a third sister, Ann, though she retained Naoko's stalking. This first draft emphasised that it was the forces of nature that compelled Kyoko to return to Kyushu.

Natsuto claimed that while the first draft of the script was "liked" by the producers, it would have resulted in the film's runtime being over four hours long. As such, much was cut, including many characters, scenes depicting Kyoko with her friends and its more fantastical elements, including Anna's dream sequence and a scene in which two characters interact in their dreams. In the finished product, these elements were largely limited to a single scene in which Kyoko wanders through a forest in a dream. Lead actress Rena Matsui used the first draft of the script to prepare for her role, as the cut content revealed much about the characters' backgrounds.

Matsui, Sae Okazaki and Sara Kurashima were cast as Kyoko, Naoko and Ann, respectively. Natsuto cast Matsui as she was also a novelist in addition to being a singer and an actress. Additionally, she felt that Matsui's personality fit Kyoko well. Okazaki was cast due to her roles in television dramas, in addition to Natsuto feeling that she had a "dark side". The role of Ann was partially written for Kurashima, who had previously appeared in Natsuto's segment of the anthology film 21st Century Girl. Natsuto claimed that Kurashima made a "lasting impression" in her audition. There were initially plans to cast foreign actors, though this as well as plans to do post-production overseas were cancelled due to the COVID-19 pandemic. Principal photography took place around May 2022. The film was largely shot on location in the Saga prefecture, though filming also took place in Fukuoka.

== Release ==
The film premiered on 11 March 2023 at the "Indie Forum" section of the 18th Osaka Asian Film Festival. It then screened at the Japan Cuts film festival, held in New York City at the end of July, before opening in theatres across Japan on 1 September.

== Reception ==
Milkman Saito of Cinema Today rated the film 5 stars out of 5, calling it an "extraordinary masterpiece" and "completely unpredictable". He opined that it is "clearly a step up" from Jeux de Plage and that it is "brimming with the chaos of Japanese-style magical realism." A critic from The Asahi Shimbun called the film "dense and multi-layered" and felt that its runtime could have been extended to three hours.
