= Vaccarini =

Vaccarini is an Italian surname. Notable people with the surname include:

- Bassano Vaccarini (1914–2002), Italian sculptor, painter, and scenographer
- Giovanni Battista Vaccarini (1702–1768), Italian architect
- Giuseppe Vaccarini (born 1952), Italian sommelier
