= Shinya Tasaki =

Japanese sommelier (born 1958)

Shinya Tasaki (Japanese name: 田崎真也 born: 21 March 1958) is a Japanese sommelier who was named best sommelier in the world in 1995 by the Association de la Sommellerie Internationale. Tasaki is the only Asian national ever to win the title of the Best Sommelier of the World, and he was awarded the Yellow Ribbon Medal of Honor by the Emperor of Japan.

== Media appearances ==
In 1998, Tasaki appeared on Fuji TV's Iron Chef as a challenger and became the only one to not be a professional chef and still win a battle after he bested Iron Chef Italian Masahiko Kobe with fatty tuna as the theme. Though it was not an explicit stipulation of the battle, by virtue of Tasaki being a world champion sommelier, both Tasaki and Kobe paired each of their dishes with various wines. He was also invited back to perform duties as a sommelier during the series finale.

=== TV dramas ===
- Black Pean (2018) - Hideo Kusunoki (ep. 3)
