= The Ten Commandments of Dog Ownership =

The Ten Commandments of Dog Ownership, also known as The Ten Commandments From a Pet's Point of View or simply Ten Commandments For Dog Owners, is a set of pet ownership rules. It was created in 1993 by Stan Rawlinson, and is written from the point of view of a dog.

This set of rules was used as the basis of the 2008 Japanese film 10 Promises to My Dog.

The commandments convey the dog's perspective to elicit empathy from humans in their role as owner. They are written from the dog's viewpoint and they allude to principles assumed important to dogs. Commandments convey ideas of trust, tolerance, anger, hurt, pain, and forgiveness amongst others.

== Popular culture ==
The Ten Commandments of Dog Ownership was translated in Japanese and compiled into a tankōbon by author Rie Hasegawa. This book was published by Nihon Bungeisha, and was released in Japan in September 2004.

Additionally, The Ten Commandments of Dog Ownership was used as an inspiration for a novel written by Hare Kawaguchi. Published on 28 July 2007, this book is entitled 10 Promises To My Dog (犬と私の１０の約束, Inu to Watashi no jyuu no Yakusoku). 10 Promises To My Dog was later adapted into a 2008 Japanese film of the same name. The film was directed by Katsuhide Motoki, and stars Rena Tanaka, Mayuko Fukuda, Etsushi Toyokawa.

== See also ==
- 10 Promises to My Dog
