= Deracine =

Deracine or variants may refer to:

- Déracine (film), a 2004 Japanese drama film
- Déraciné, a 2018 adventure video game
