= Marc Almert =

German sommelier (born 1991)

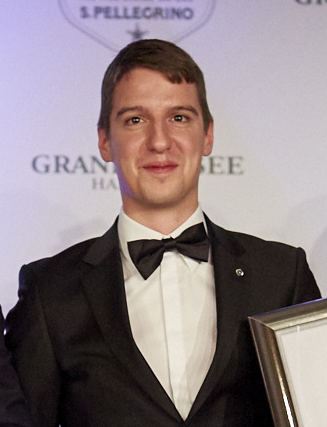
- Born: 1991 (age 34–35); Cologne, Germany
- Occupation: Sommelier
- Title: World's Best Sommelier, 2019

Marc Almert (born 1991 in Cologne) is a German sommelier and the 2019 ASI World's Best Sommelier.

== Biography ==
Almert was born in Cologne in 1991. He passed the Advanced Sommelier Exam by the Court of Master Sommeliers in 2016. He was ASI World's Best Sommelier in 2019. He is currently head of the wine department at the two-Michelin-star restaurant Pavillon in Zurich. Almert tastes wine for Decanter.

== Awards ==
- 2016, International Gaggenau Sommelier Awards.
- 2016, WOSA Sommelier Cup, Overall winner.
- 2017, Best Sommelier in Germany.
- 2019, ASI World's Best Sommelier.
