= Black Forceps =

2018 Japanese drama

Black Forceps (Japanese: ブラックペアン), also known as "Black Pean" or "Black Paean", is a Japanese drama based on the book "Black Pean 1988" by author Takeru Kaidō. It aired in April 2018 on TBS Television (Japan).

A sequel, based on the books "Blaze Mes 1990" and "Cerisier Center 1991" by the same author, aired in July 2024.

== Synopsis ==
=== Season 1 ===
Tojo University Hospital is known for having high success in its Surgery Department. Its Director, Professor and heart surgeon Seigō Saeki has implemented the "Saeki Procedure", which is a heart surgery performed without stopping the heart. He has been considered as a candidate for President of the Japanese Society of Cardiac Surgery, as is his rival, Keisuke Nishizaki, Director of Surgery of Teika University. Nishisaki considers he is better for the position and schemes to bring down Tojo's fame to achieve it. For that, he sends surgeon Gonta Takashina, fervent user of the latest devices, to Tojo.

In Tojo, Takashina will face Seishirō Tokai, a surgeon whose (non-mechanical) surgical technique has a 100% of success, but whose attitude alienates everyone around him.

=== Season 2 ===
Six years have passed since the last encounter with Tokai. Tojo's medical crew has continued to grow and improve, including Tokai's "rival", Takashina, promoter of the "Snipe" medical device, formerly of Teika, now a part of Tojo.

Saeki, creator of the world-famous Saeki surgery technique, is now Tojo University Hospital's director. He aims for the position of president of the Japanese Medical Association, pinnacle of research medicine in Japan, and plans to open a new hospital that specializes in cardiac surgery. He has heard about Yukihiko Amagi, a devilish, world-renowned genius surgeon that works in the Heart Center in Australia's Gold Coast, and wants him for his team.

Sera, former resident and an assistant to Tokai, now a full-fledged cardiac surgeon, is in charge of getting to Amagi, who is, eerily, a Tokai doppleganger. Sera is to deliver a letter from Saeki to Amagi.

== Cast ==
Additional information

=== Tojo University Hospital ===
- Kazunari Ninomiya
  - as surgeon Seishiro Tokai (season 1). Known as a surgery genius for his perfect score, he is a rebel, rarely attends conferences and other administrative events. His attitude often alienates those around him Re-appears in (season 2) in flashbacks, and in episode 8 he makes a come back.
  - as surgeon Yukihiko Amagi (season 2), a world leader in cardiac coronary artery bypass grafting; has worked for many years at the Heart Center on Australia's Gold Coast. His other passion is gambling
- Wakana Aoi as operating room nurse Miwa Hanabusa (season 1). Continues in season 2 as a more experienced, caring nurse.
- Ryoma Takeuchi as 1st. year resident Masashi Sera (season 1). Continues in season 2 as a more experienced and reliable doctor
- Seiyō Uchino as Director of the Surgery Department, Professor and cardiac surgeon Seigō Saeki (season 1). Known for the "Saeki Procedure". He has become Director of the hospital in season 2
- Kotaro Koizumi returns in season 2 as doctor Takashina Gonta (originally from Teika), as a Tojo ally.
- Taro Shigaki as Tojo University Director Nobuaki Moriya (season 1), his affiliation is with Teika, not Tojo
- Satoshi Hashimoto as Surgery Department associate professor Seiichirō Kurosaki (season 1), ref name="TBS BP1 cast" /> continues in season 2
- Misuzu Kanno as Head nurse Makoto Fujiwara (season 1), continues on season 2
- Shuri as surgical nurse Mari Nekota (season 1), with a skill in preparing medical instruments, continues in season 2
- Haruka Uchimura as surgeon Yūji Kakitani (season 1), continues on season 2
- Hiroki Konno as surgeon Fuminori Sekikawa (season 1), second surgery using a snipe, continues in season 2
- Kanro Morita as resident doctor Kouhei Taguchi (season 1), continues in season 2
- Yusuke Yamada as resident doctor Kōichi Hayami (season 1), continues in season 2
- Sae Okazaki as resident doctor Tōko Shimazu (season 1)
- Naruki Matsukawa as resident doctor Tatsuya Kitajima (season 1), continues in season 2
- Kaho Mizutani as nurse Ayumi Miyamoto (season 1), continues in season 2
- Anna Hara as nurse Mio Arai (season 1)
- Kōki Okada as Sera's supervisor Tadashi Yokoyama (season 1). He leaves the hospital after a botched surgery that Tokai has to fix
- Kim Mu-jun as new resident Park Min-jae, a former resident in a Korean hospital that goes to Australia in search for Amagi on behalf of his mother. (season 2)

=== Teika University Hospital ===
- Kotaro Koizumi as surgeon and lecturer Takashina Gonta (season 1), who is on loan in Tojo. Promoter of new surgical technology
- Ichikawa Ennosuke IV as Professor of Surgery Keisuke Nishizaki (season 1). Mainly engaged in research

=== Others ===
- Ayako Kato as Clinical trial coordinator Kaori Kinoshita (season 1)
- Kōji Katō as Hideto Ikenaga (season 1), editor-in-chief of the medical journal Japan Journal of Surgery
- Itta Maru as surgeon Kenichi Shinohara (season 1)
- Jouji Shibue as surgeon Masato Fukumoto (season 1)
- Choi Ji-woo as Korean doctor, hospital and restaurant owner Park Seo-hyun (season 2). She is resident Park Min-jae's mother. She goes with him to Australia to look for Amagi.
- Minami Tanaka as clinical trial coordinator Misaki Shiino, Kinoshita's junior (season 2)
- Kōji Ishizaka as Ryūtarō Shingyōji, chairman of the Sakuramiya City Medical Association. He is a former professor at the Shingoji Department of Surgery at Tojo University, where Seigō Saeki and Ichiro Tokai, Seichiro Tokai's father, once worked (season 2)
- Yasunori Danta as Tatsuo Sugai, a professor of cardiac surgery at Ishin University. He is Saeki's rival (season 2)

=== Tokai family ===
- Mitsuko Baisho as Tokai's mother, Harue Tokai (season 1)
- Kazunaga Tsuji as Tokai's deceased father, surgeon Ichiro Tokai (season 1)

=== Season 1 guests ===
- Momiji Yamamura as Taeko Minagawa, Sera's first patient (ep. 1)
- Naoko Sawamatsu as Yoshie Koyama, the wife of a patient (ep. 2)
- Yōshichi Shimada as Kaneto Koyama, a patient brought in an emergency (ep. 2)
- Shinya Tasaki as Hideo Kusunoki, a patient under the care of Tokai and Sera (ep. 3)
- Yugo Kochi (SixTones) as Hayato Tamura, candidate for snipe surgery, but ends being operated on by Tokai, due to being a complicated and rare case(ep. 3)
- Tsukasa Yoda as Koji Tamura, Hayato's father (ep. 3)
- Kurumi Inagaki as Koharu Shimano, a patient who has been transferred from Teika University Hospital. Takashina was her primary care physician at Teika (eps. 4, 5)
- Masami Tanaka as Naho Shimano, Koharu's mother (eps. 4, 5)
- Takuma Oto as Jin Matsuoka, a surgeon at Teika University Hospital who specializes in endoscopic surgery using support robot "Darwin" (ep. 5)
- Akira Fukuzawa as Masayuki Tomizawa, Chief Medical Officer of the Ministry of Health, Labor and Welfare (ep. 5)
- Saki Aibu as Shoko Yamamoto, Kinoshita's former colleague nurse (ep. 7)
- Shinobu Hasegawa as Hidefumi Takeda, a doctor at Teika University Hospital (ep. 7)
- Shintarō Hayashi (Hayashin) (YouTuber, Laters) as Ryuichi Kobayashi, a patient without an apparent reason to be hospitaized.
- Shōzō Uesugi as Kobayashi
- Yo Takahashi as Katsuya Sakaguchi surgeon at Teika (ep. 8)
- Akira Yamamoto (actor) as Tatsuji Iinuma, a patient under the care of nurse Hanabusa. He was originally Ichiro Tokai's patient.

=== Season 2 guests ===
- Naoya Makoto as Sera's patient Shigeno (episode 2)
- Tomu Ranju as Shigeno's daughter Asami (episode 2)
- Reika Horikoshi as Asami's daughter Yui (episode 2)
- Hanae Shoji[ja] as welfare–receiving patient Toshiko (episode 3)
- Danshun Tatekawa as Toshiko's son Takatoshi (episode 3)
- Tomio Umezawa as Amagi's prospect patient Mizuno (episode 3)
- Toshiaki Megumi as Amagi's prospect patient Kizaki (episode 5)

== Story ==
=== Season 1 ===
Doctor Seigo Saeki, professor and director of the Cardiac Surgery department at Tojo University Hospital, is known for his method called "Saeki Procedure", in which he operates on the heart of the patient without stopping it. His rival from Teika University, Professor Keisuke Nishizaki, who is seeking the post of president of the Japan Surgical Society, as is Saeki, has gone to Tojo, as have clinical trial coordinator Kaori Kinoshita and editor-in-chief of the medical journal Hideto Ikenaga, to watch Saeki in action, when a sudden emergency arises. Saeki sends a team to another operating room to attend that patient, but when his condition worsens, surgeon Seishiro Tokai, appears and finishes the operation, surprising doctor and lecturer Gonta Takashina. Tokai, who's called the "Devil of the operating room", has only one condition to do it: that the operating doctor submit his resignation letter and give him 10 million yen as compensation.

Takashina, who had been sent to Tojo by Nishizaki to promote the use of the "Snipe" medical device, has operated on a couple of patients with it, to prove the benefits of its use, but fails the 2nd surgery due to the patient's pre-existing condition, which was resolved by Tokai, after resident Sera begged him to (and got forced to work "for life" for Tokai), since it was his patient. On another day, Tokai works on patient Koyama to save his life, but he still needs another surgery to replace his mitral valve. Takashina suggests using the Snipe for it.

Takashina has not produced the results expected by Nishizaki to get the "impact factor" that will get him elected as president. There are 2 new patients at Tojo, one of which could be an ideal candidate to have a "Snipe" procedure done. As Takashina refuses to do the procedure on the music student, Saeki orders Tokai to do it. Seeing the success that "Snipe" has brought to Tojo, Takashina is conflicted as to who to include as chief researcher on his papers, Saeki, where the procedures had been taking part, or Nishizaki, where the paper was being written, and was at its final stages. In between, Takashina had transferred a patient from Teika to Tojo, and asked Saeki to perform a "Snipe" procedure on him. When Saeki appointed Tokai to do it, he refused, and, angrily, recriminated Saeki for crossing to the other side. Saeki, furious, told Tokai to not intervene in any more surgeries.

Takashina has finally decided who to include in his paper: Nishizaki. This means that he will return to Teika. Tokai had conveyed "certain concerns" to Saeki about patient Koharu Shimano, those concerns related to a "Snipe" procedure, which, because of her condition, couldn't be resolved through open-heart surgery. Takashina suggested using the endoscopic surgery support robot "Darwin".

Tokai's mother is taken in for an emergency surgery. Kurosaki, the attending surgeon, operates on her, but, unknowingly, leaves some of the tumor he was removing, and that is noticed by Tokai in a post-operative examination. He blames Kurosaki for malpractice, and demands compensation from Tojo. The election of president of the Japan Surgical Society has shifted battle, from the use of the "Snipe" to the use of "Darwin". A Japanese version, the "Caesar" was introduced in Tojo as a clinical trial, and Saeki puts Takashina in charge of it. Takashina considers who the perfect candidate to try it out on is: Tokai's mother, Harue.

Tokai is recruited by Teika, and Takashina begins to question Nishisaki's reasons to do it. Saeki also questions Nishizaki's actions, when Tomizawa, from the Ministry of Health, Labor and Welfare, promoter of the Darwin / Caesar, and who is an acquaintance of Nishizaki, takes a patient to Tojo to undergo a Darwin procedure. The Darwin / Caesar trials are over, and Nishizaki wants to unveil the perform the unveiling surgery under the leadership of Teika. Seeing no benefit, Saeki proposes Nishizaki to combine teams into one, with Tokai, Takashina and Sera at the helm. Teika staff went to Tojo, but immediately felt overwhelmed with Tokai's presence, as he was in charge of the Darwin surgeries. On the other hand, Saeki's presence around Tojo had declined, and Tokai had urged a reluctant Sera to follow him.

Saeki falls, and his condition reveals an existing disease in the cardiac area. Urgent intervention is required, and only Tokai can do it, but he is away looking for a patient at a neighboring hospital. However, the patient is not there, and Saeki holds that key. Tokai reveals to Sera that his true intention will be resolved after helping Saeki. But Saeki refuses Tokai's surgery, and proposes the use of Caesar, information of which has been taken away to Teika on Nishizaki's orders. Tokai performs the operation as a temporary measure. He asks Saeki to reveal the whereabouts of "Tatsuji Iinuma", the patient he is looking for, as a condition for performing a reoperation to cure him completely. Saeki refuses to answer, and forces himself to travel to Tokyo to a surgical conference. In Tojo, the condition of a "hidden" patient is discovered by Takashina. This patient is Iinuma, the one that Tokai was looking for. Miwa was in charge of him, at the request of Head nurse Fujiwara. He and Saeki are the reason behind Tokai being in Tojo... and the black forceps.

=== Season 2 ===
Six years passed since Tokai left Tojo. Saeki, now Director of Tojo's Hospital, plans to open a new one specialized in cardiac surgery. He aims to become president of the All Japan Medical Association. Sera, now a full-fledge cardiac surgeon, has to deliver a letter from Saeki to a doctor called Yukihiko Amagi, who is attending a medical conference in Australia, so he travels there with Yuji Kakitani, a senior doctor. On a Gold Coast beach where they find an unconscious boy, a mysterious man gives advice to Kakitani, who is tending to the boy. On this man's advice, the boy survives, and the mysterious man disappears as fast as he appeared. At the conference, Amagi is nowhere in sight. Frustrated about this, Sera and Kakitani are leaving when they meet Park Seo-hyun and her son Min-jae, who have also gone to Australia searching for Amagi. Min-jae joins the pair, after they are informed that Amagi could be at the racetrack. Sera does a double-take. Is it Tokai? The man standing in front of him, the same man he had passed earlier, was Amagi, a world-class genius surgeon, called a diabulous (devil) in the medical world, who plays with people and money.

Amagi accepts Saeki's proposal and decides to go to Japan. But it isn't without controversy. His plans for the new hospital draw resentment from those around him, And to add to it, he boasts that his introduction in the Japanese medical world will be performing a public surgery. Amagi is the only one in the world with a way to handle successfully direct anastomosis, an advanced form of coronary artery bypass grafting, and he says that he will show it off. Sera's patient, Shigeno, a pastry shop owner, is in need of a surgery, but doesn't have the funds to cover it, so his daughter, Asami, plans to sell the recipe and rights to an apple pie that Shigeno developed. But when he and his granddaughter learn about it, they vehemently oppose. Unfortunately, Shigeno has no choice but to receive Amagi's direct anastomosis, which is very expensive. So Amagi and Yui make a bet.

Takashina has been working at Tojo. He has been secretly aiming for the top position of the new hospital, as the shadow of Sugai, a professor at Ishin University, who is in conflict with Saeki, and with whom he is competing for the position of president of the All Japan Medical Association, is creeping up on him.

Amagi arbitrarily names the new hospital being planned in Sakuranomiya City as the "Cerisier Heart Center". However, he is scolded by Saeki saying he should explain the situation to local people first, to what Amagi tells him that he will hold a public surgery to announce his appointment as director of the center, as well as its name.

While Sera supervises new resident Park and his patients, and continues attending his own, he finds that Park's patient Toshiko, a welfare recipient, is the perfect person for Amagi to operate on, but Amagi refuses, instead trying to persuade Mizuno, a director of the business association coordinating investments for the new hospital, and Sugai's intermediary, to undergo direct anastomosis surgery. Amagi asks Shingyoji, the president of the Sakuranomiya City Medical Association, to introduce him to patients for public surgery.

Kazuko Tomiya, a famous lawyer for medical litigation, is looking for Amagi, who is being sought out for fraud. Saeki stops the situation by settling with the people who have come with her, canceling Amagi's upcoming surgery. Sera sees Miwa arguing with Tomiya, who turns out to be Miwa's mother, and intervenes. Tomiya collapses while at the hospital and needs urgent medical intervention. Sera attends to her, but there is a complication. Amagi is the only one who can solve it, but Tomiya refuses, opting for an AI procedure developed at Ishin by Sugai. Sera and Miwa try to convince her otherwise.

Amagi unexpectedly uses the Ishin AI procedure, and is requested by Kizaki, a wealthy South Korean restaurant chain owner. Saeki suggests that Amagi take the request on the condition that Kizaki invest on the new hospital. Amagi travels to South Korea amd Kizaki accepts. They return to Japan and Kizaki is hospitalized at Tojo. Seo-hyun, Park's mother and a patient in Tojo, runs into Kizaki, who turns out to be her rival in the restaurant industry. He is also involved with Sugai. Seo-hyun urges Amagi not to perform the surgery. Amagi, however, remains completely unfazed.

Sugai attempts to level up by operating on Chairman Uesugi of Uesugi Motors with the updated Elcano Darwin robot, by using Amagi's knowledge of the case. But, after assessing the patient's condition, Amagi decides to cancel the operation. Hayakawa, the developer of the updated robot, and who, like nurse Nekota, who had worked at Ishin eight years before, had learned of an incident there, collapses. Saeki operated on Uesugi, without using the "Saeki Method", while Amagi was away. Head Nurse Fujiwara noticed that Saeki wasn't acting like his usual self and it concerned her. Uesugi's son Toshihiro asked Amagi to intentionally botch the surgery in exchange for a substantial fee. He wanted his father to retire. Sugai wanted to use the Uesugi medical division to his advantage. Uesugi's operation date fell on the same day as the election. Amagi fails the operation, the one he was an expert of.

Deputy Director Ejiri decides to run for Tojo's directorship, with the support of the head of the Sakuramiya City Medical Association, Shingyoji, Saeki’s former mentor, and with whom he had a falling out following an incident five years ago. Amagi investigates this incident and its relationship to his own family. Amagi goes to the on–call room where Tokai used to live and finds some things left behind, one of them a photograph. Saeki receives a message from Tokai. Sera and Park open an urgent mail package left for Amagi, on his behalf. In it, they find an echocardiogram and a contrast-enhanced CT scan. Although the patient's name is missing, the images reveal signs of a past bypass surgery and indicate a condition requiring an immediate intervention. This patient could reveal the relationship between the incident and Amagi and Tokai. Tomizawa from the Ministry of Health, Labour and Welfare pays Amagi a visit. Upon hearing from Tomizawa the problem to grant a license to a facility to be led by a doctor known for demanding exorbitant fees from patients, Amagi resigns as Cerisier's director.

Amagi, who has suffered from a heart condition since childhood, collapses. Sera and Saeki attend to him and attempt to operate, but realize that they have to use both the "Saeki Method" and Direct Anastomosis at the same time. Suddenly, Tokai appears in the operating room dressed in scrubs. Saeki and Sera turn to him and ask if he can perform the Direct Anastomosis, to what Tokai replies that he won't do it because it is a gamble. He then steps up and operates on who is revealed to be his twin brother.

Two surgeries are going on at the same time. In one, Amagi tends to Tokunaga, the patient at the International Society of Cardiac Surgery live demonstration, while Sera, in Tojo, tends to Yui, a patient who suffers from acute mitral regurgitation. Amagi's patient suddenly develops hyperthermia just as the thoracic artery is being dissected. To make matters worse, the necessary medication to treat the condition is unavailable. Reminded of a traumatic nightmare involving his mother, Amagi decides to perform an extremely high-risk procedure using a cardiopulmonary bypass machine, with Takashina providing support. However, they discover that all three coronary arteries intended for the bypass have already been severed. Shingyoji, who is present at the venue, advises Amagi to halt the operation in accordance with the society's wishes. However, Saeki urges him to continue. At Tojo, Sera attempts the operation using the SNIPE system, with assistance from Kurosaki. Neither procedure has resulted as expected. Saeki reveals the true purpose of the new hospital.

Amagi leaves Tojo. It is revealed that he died some time after that. Tokai is seen years later, under the sakura tree his brother planted. Nekota reaches him and gives him a white coat, which Tokai puts on. The coat shows some embroidering that resembles the Tojo logo.

== Music ==
"Kono Michi o", theme song for the drama, was written by Kazumasa Oda. The song was included in a single, released on May 2.

Soundtrack for the series was written by composer Hideakira Kimura.

Oda returns with "Sono saki ni aru mono", theme song for season 2 (2024), that has chorus by actress Takako Matsu and Triceratops member Shō Wada.

== Main medical instruments shown in the drama ==
- Dr. Saeki uses the heart-lung machine (a machine that temporarily takes over the function of the heart and lungs during open-heart surgery by maintaining the circulation of blood and oxygen throughout the body) to work on the heart in his "Saeki Procedure", which can produce very little damage in the heart muscle. In ep. 2, Dr. Takashina, who proudly mentions the use of the "Snipe" device without the need to use the heart-lung machine, had to use it, as an emergency arose after trying to retrieve a stent from the heart of the patient they were operating on.
- "Snipe" is a type of device used, including after cardiac catheterization, to install, primarily, a stent in a mitral valve replacement procedure. Takashina had studied the artifact overseas and took it to Japan to introduce its use as an alternative to regular surgery. Though it does not exist in reality, there are several manufacturers getting up-to-date with technology that can bring them to light. The model in the series is a pistol-type apparatus, probably molded from some types of catheter syringes, used to insert the catheter into the body in angiography and other catheterization procedures. According to Dr. Shunsuke Yamagishi, Department of Cardiovascular Surgery, IMUS Tokyo Katsushika General Hospital, and technical advisor for the series, the use of the "Snipe" as said by Takashina ("anyone can use it") was proven wrong, since not even himself could perform the operation correctly. Knowing all the technical data for the apparatus is not enough if the doctor has not taken the time to examine all possible consequences.
- Use of the Da Vinci robot (named in the drama as Darwin) was shown in episode 5. Newhart Watanabe International Hospital, a pioneer in da Vinci surgery for the heart in Japan, was used as background for the drama, with Dr. Gou Watanabe providing technical support.
- "Black Pean", the instrument that gives the name to the drama, is a type of forceps called a hemostat. It is used to clamp exposed blood vessels shut during an operation. Saeki uses it as a symbol of his responsibility, and as an instrument during Iinuma's operation in the last episode.
