= Association de la Sommellerie Internationale =

International non-profit organization

The Association de la Sommellerie Internationale (ASI) is a nonprofit organization founded in Reims in 1969 to develop and promote the sommelier profession worldwide. Every three years since its creation, it holds a competition in an international city and names a person as the best sommelier in the world: the World's Best Sommelier Contest.

== Meilleur Sommelier du Monde (World's Best Sommelier) ==
The World's Best Sommelier Competition has been in existence since 1969.

- 2026 - Portugal - Nikolai Haram Svorte (Norway)
- 2023 - Paris - Raimonds Tomsons (Latvia)
- 2019 - Antwerp - Marc Almert (Germany)
- 2016 - Mendoza - Jon Arvid Rosengren (Sweden)
- 2013 - Tokyo - Paolo Basso (Switzerland)
- 2010 - Santiago - Gerard Basset (United Kingdom)
- 2007 - Rhodes - Andreas Larsson (Sweden)
- 2004 - Athens - Enrico Bernardo (Italy)
- 2000 - Montréal - Olivier Poussier (France)
- 1998 - Vienna - Markus del Monego (Germany)
- 1995 - Tokyo - Shinya Tasaki (Japan)
- 1992 - Rio de Janeiro - Philippe Faure-Brac (France)
- 1989 - Paris - Serge Dubs (France)
- 1986 - Venice - Jean-Claude Jambon (France)
- 1983 - Brussels - Jean-Luc Pouteau (France)
- 1978 - Lisbon - Giuseppe Vaccarini (Italy)
- 1971 - Milan - Piero Sattanino (Italy)
- 1969 - Brussels - Armand Melkonian (France)

Winners by Country
Country	Winner
France	6
Italy	3
Sweden	2
Germany	2
Switzerland	1
United Kingdom	1
Japan	1
Latvia	1
Norway	1

== See also ==
- Court of Master Sommeliers
- Master of Wine
- Confrérie des Chevaliers du Tastevin
- Wine & Spirit Education Trust
