= TheFrenchCellar =

Singaporean wine company

The French Cellar (Wala Club)
- Services: Wine and Liquor Subscription
- Owner: Wala Technology
- Website: www.walaclub.sg

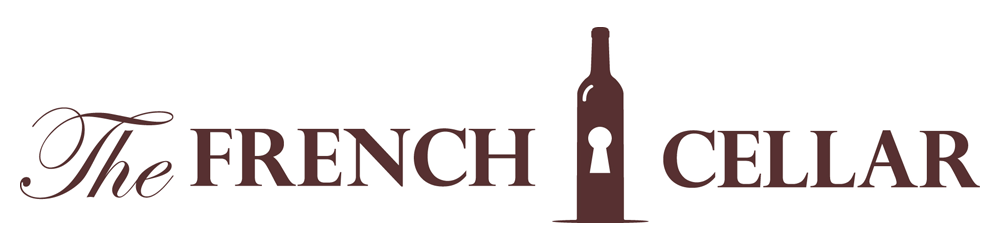
the Logo of The French Cellar

The French Cellar is a wine subscription company based in Singapore.

== History ==
The company was founded in 2013 by Vincent Morello and Eric Joubert. The wine bottles were selected by the sommelier Nicolas Rebut. It is one of the first online wine subscription companies in Asia.

In May 2019, the French Cellar announced through its Facebook page that operations ceased as of May 27, and launched a process of voluntary liquidation. Deliveries had become irregular in the months before the closure, and some customers lost several hundred dollars in yearly subscriptions paid upfront.

The French Cellar was acquired by Wala Technology Pte Ltd in 2019 and became the Wala Club.

== Description ==
The French Cellar specialized in delivering French wines to homes in Asia.
