= Association of European Sommeliers =

European industry association

The Association of European Sommeliers (AES) is a non-profit organization founded in 2004 to promote the profession of sommelier in Europe. It was founded by the sommelier Brigitte Leloup, presided by the chief sommelier Thierry Corona, and historically sponsored by the oenophile actor Pierre Richard.
