= Yoshihiko Hosoda =

Japanese actor (born 1988)

- 細田 善彦
- Born: March 4, 1988 (age 38); Tokyo, Japan
- Occupation: Actor
- Years active: 2004–present

Yoshihiko Hosoda (細田 善彦, Hosoda Yoshihiko) (born March 4, 1988) is a Japanese actor from Tokyo who has starred the movies Detroit Metal City (2008) and Ooku (2010). He was once affiliated to the talent agency Stardust Promotion under his stage name Yoshihiko Hosoda (though his first name is written in hiragana Hosoda Yoshihiko (細田 よしひこ)), but left in October 2013. He is currently affiliated with Alpha Agency under his real name.

== Filmography ==
=== Television series ===
Year	Title	Role	Other notes	Ref.
2007	Life	Katsumi Sako		
2015	Burning Flower	Ryoichiro Arai	Taiga drama	
2016	Sanada Maru	Hōjō Ujinao	Taiga drama	
2021	The Grand Family			
2021	Reach Beyond the Blue Sky	Takamatsu Ryōun	Taiga drama	
2023	Fermat's Cuisine	Katsuya Hotei		
2026	Straight to Hell			

=== Film ===
Year	Title	Role	Other notes	Ref.
2022	Love of a Brute			
2023	Go Away, Moebius!!			
2023	Spring in Between			
2023	My Brother, the Alien	Hirofumi Shishido		
2024	Blue Imagine	Shunta		
2026	Urusai Kono Oto no Zenbu	Urihara		
