= 10 Promises to My Dog =

- Japanese film poster
- Directed by: Katsuhide Motoki
- Written by: Hare Kawaguchi; Yoshimitsu Sawamoto
- Story by: Hare Kawaguchi
- Starring: Rena Tanaka; Mayuko Fukuda; Etsushi Toyokawa
- Edited by: Sao Kawasei
- Music by: Chu Sosou
- Distributed by: Shochiku
- Release date: 15 March 2008 (Japan)
- Running time: 117 minutes
- Country: Japan
- Language: Japanese
- Box office: US$15,332,225

10 Promises To My Dog (犬と私の１０の約束, Inu to Watashi no Jū no Yakusoku) is a 2008 Japanese film directed by Katsuhide Motoki, and starring Rena Tanaka, Mayuko Fukuda and Etsushi Toyokawa. Rena Tanaka and Mayuko Fukuda play the adult and the young version of Akari Saito, while actor Etsushi Toyokawa stars as Akari's father.

Based on a novel by Hare Kawaguchi, this film tells the story of Akari Saito and her dog Socks. The pair supported each other as they grew up together. This story is closely tied to "The Ten Commandments of Dog Ownership", a list of ownership rules written from a dog's point of view.

10 Promises to My Dog was released in the Japanese box office on 15 March 2008. The film grossed a total of US$15,332,225 in six countries, and was the 19th-highest grossing Japanese film of 2008.

== Plot ==
Akari is neglected by her father, a surgeon who works long hours and puts his career before family. Her mother is hospitalized because of an incurable disease. Akari longs for a dog who can keep her company. One day, a Golden Retriever puppy appears in the garden of Akari's house, and Akari adopts it. At her mother's suggestion, Akari christens it "Socks", because of the puppy's white paws. Her mother makes Akari promise she will follow The Ten Commandments of Dog Ownership. Akari's friend, guitarist Susumu, forms an attachment with Socks as well.

A few months later, Akari's mother dies, and Akari finds out that Socks was placed in the garden by her mother. Not long after Akari's mother died, the family moves to Sapporo because her father has been given a lecturer post at a university there. However, they cannot bring Socks along because their dormitory does not allow pets. Akari has to reluctantly entrust Socks to Susumu.

Another problem surfaces when Susumu is accepted into a prestigious music school in Paris. On the day that he is leaving, Akari's father, who was supposed to be on leave that day, is suddenly called back to the hospital for an "emergency" operation. This causes Akari to be late in seeing Susumu off. The "emergency" operation turns out to be a minor one, and he resigns after feeling guilty about disappointing his daughter. The family later moves back to their old home in Hakodate, and Socks comes back to stay with them. Akari's father sets up a clinic in the home, which proves to be popular with the locals.

10 years later, Akari is a university student studying to become a veterinarian. She sees a poster advertising Susumu's upcoming performance in the city. The pair have a tearful reunion, and they start dating. During this time, she starts to feel that Socks is a constraint to her. She starts to bemoan the sacrifices that she has to make because of Socks. After Akari graduates from university, she becomes a zookeeper at Asahiyama Zoo. Akari seldom returns to her home, and neglects Socks in the process. However, she is reminded of the good friend Socks was when the dog helps Susumu gain enough confidence to play the guitar again after an accident.

As time passes, Socks grows old and feeble. Akari is shocked at how much weaker Socks looks on one of her rare visits home, and promises to visit it often. However, due to her heavy workload, she is unable to fulfill that promise. One day, her father tells her that Socks is dying. She rushes back just in time. As its energy saps away, Akari reads the Ten Commandments of Dog Ownership again to see if she had done what she had promised 10 years ago.

After Socks' death, Akari and her father find long-lost photographs of Socks, and a letter from her mother. The letter tells Akari that Socks was meant to replace herself, though she added that Socks will not live as long as Akari. Akari is also reminded of the fact that her father sacrificed his career for her. Not long after, Akari and Susumu get married.

== Cast ==
- Rena Tanaka as the adult Akari Saito, a veterinarian at the Asahiyama Zoo.
- Mayuko Fukuda as the young Akari Saito.
- Etsushi Toyokawa as Yuichi Saito, Akari's father
- Shota Sato as the young Susumu Hoshi, Akari's childhood friend
- Ryo Kase as the adult Susumu Hoshi, a distinguished guitarist who later opens his own music school. Susumu later married Akari.
- Chizuru Ikewaki as Yuko Inoue, Akari's best friend in university. She later become a sales clerk at a departmental store.
- Reiko Takashima as Fumiko Saito, Akari's mother. She died due to an incurable disease.
- Akira Fuse as Shinichi Hoshi, Susumu's father. He is a professional guitarist like his son.
- Akiko Aitsuki as Susumu's mother
- Akane Osawa
- Takashi Sasano
- Pierre Taki as the zookeeper
- Mina Fujii as the passerby who takes a photo of Akari and her mother
- Hana Ebise

== Production ==
10 Promises to My Dog is based on a novel by Hare Kawaguchi. This novel was in turn inspired by a set of rules entitled "The Ten Commandments of Dog Ownership".

== Reception ==
Kevin Ma, reviewer for Love HK Film.com, describes director Katsuhide Motoki's approach to the story "very low-key and matter-of-fact", and added that "it almost feels like he decided to tell the story in a way that any director-for-hire would". He also criticized some of the characters. In particular, he said that Rena Tanaka "barely registers as the central character" and that "Ryo Kase fares even worse [than Rena Tanaka], but mostly because of his poorly-written plot device of a character than his acting skills in general." However, he did praise the child actors, saying that Mayuko Fukuda gives "the best performance as the child Akari". He also praised the ending of the film, describing it as "emotionally powerful and yet brilliantly understated". Yahoo! Japan holds the film with a review of 3.30 points (stars) out of 738 reviews.
