= Aleksandar Zeremski =

Serbian entrepreneur, investor and economist (born 1969)

- Александар Зеремски
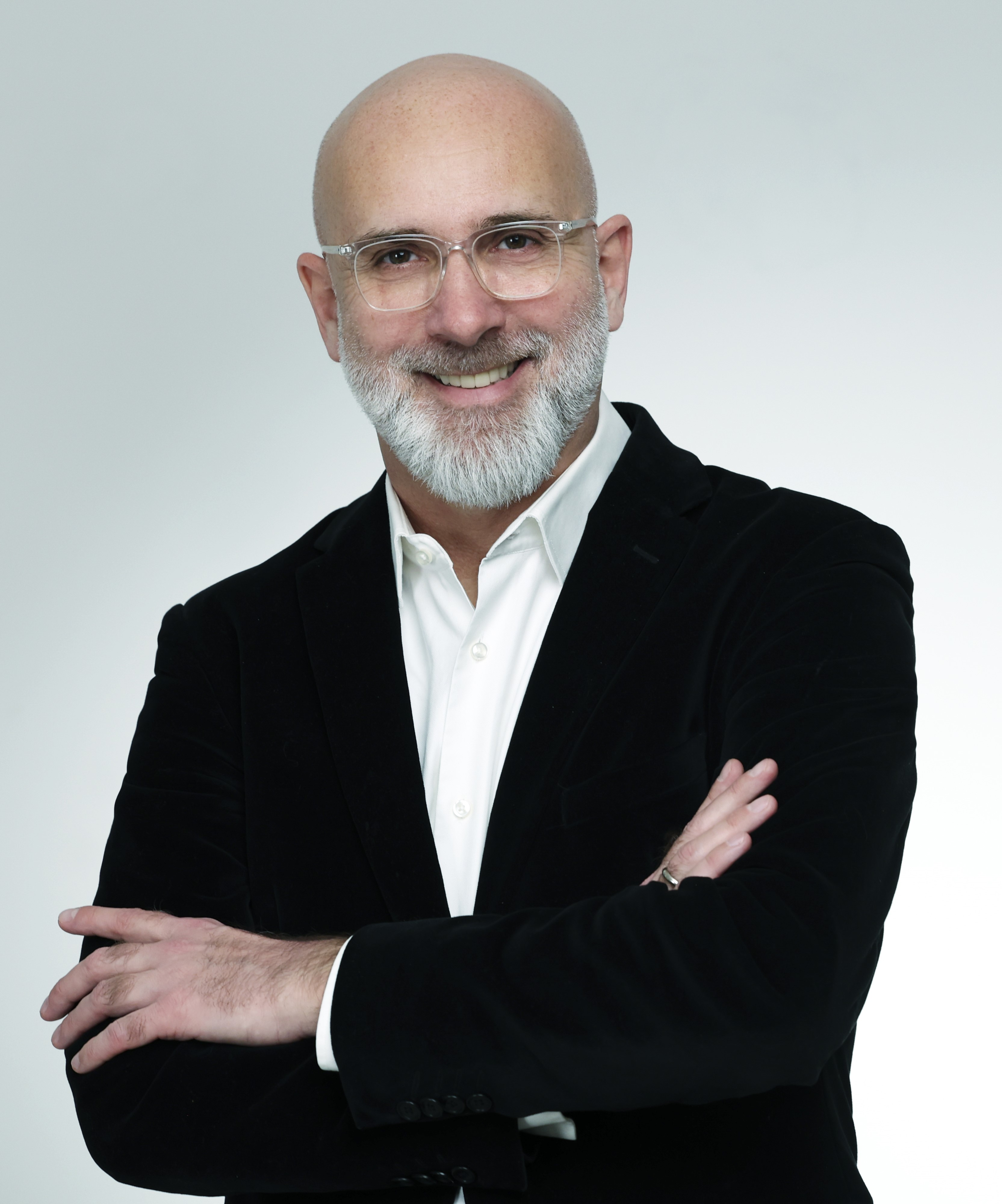
- Zeremski in 2025
- Born: 15 June 1969; Belgrade, PR Serbia, FPR Yugoslavia
- Education: The Faculty of Economics in Belgrade, University of Belgrade
- Alma mater: University of Belgrade
- Occupation: Businessman
- Years active: 1992—
- Website: watersommelierzeremski.com

Aleksandar Zeremski (Serbian Cyrillic: Александар Зеремски; Born in Belgrade on June 15, 1969) is a Serbian entrepreneur, investor, and economist. He is the first and only certified Water Sommelier in Serbia and the Western Balkans, an expert specialized in identifying and evaluating the quality of drinking water, including its taste and smell.

== Biography ==
He graduated from the Faculty of Economics at the University of Belgrade in 1995 and obtained his PhD in 2006 from the University for Trade and Banking at Alfa BK University.

On the recommendation of the Economic Institute in Belgrade, the Ministry of science of the Republic of Serbia awarded him the scientific title of ″Scientific Associate in the field of social sciences – economics″ in 2008. In 2014, the Ministry of Education, Science, and Technological Development of the Republic of Serbia awarded him the scientific title ″Senior Scientific Associate in the field of social sciences – economics″, following the recommendation of the Institute of Social Sciences in Belgrade.

He also engages in scientific work in the field of social sciences – economics and management of organizational systems. He is the founder and director of ″Spring Up Alliance″, a company based in Belgrade, which owns the brand ″Divna Voda″ (Divna Water). He was a member of the Scientific Board of the Economic Institute in Belgrade from 2007 to 2017.

He is married to conductor Divna Ljubojević and has three daughters – Manja, Mia, and Nina.

== Business career ==
He began his business career in 1992 at the first private bank in Serbia, Karić Banka DD Belgrade, as a clerk, and quickly advanced, becoming the Director of the Bank's Loan Department. In 1999, he became the executive director for Corporate Banking at Astra Banka AD Belgrade.

In 2002, he transitioned into the media sector and became the General Director of RTV BK Telecom, where he spent the next four years. He continued his career at the Economic Institute in Belgrade, where, from 2007 to 2017, he was engaged in scientific work and participated in the implementation of numerous projects financed by the Ministry of Science, Technological Development and Innovation of the Republic of Serbia.

From 2008 to 2011, he worked for the international consulting company ″Deloitte Serbia″ as vice president, and the following year, he provided consulting services for many private projects.

In 2018, together with a group of friends, he founded ″Spring Up Alliance″, a company based in Belgrade. The company deals with the sale and distribution of water under the registered and protected name ″Divna″. Through the brand ″Divna″, which includes a portfolio of several natural spring waters, and the label ″Healthy Waters of Serbia″, he introduced a new concept to the Serbian market regarding the consumption of water as a food product, raising consumer awareness.

In 2024, to enhance both his business and personal interests in studying the significance of water in today's world, he became the first and, to date, the only internationally certified Water Sommelier in Serbia and the Western Balkans. This international recognition was awarded to him by Doemens Academy GmbH, the most important European certification institution in this field, based in Germany. He is a member of the Water Sommelier Union based in Germany.

== Bibliography ==
The author is either the author or co-author of 4 monographs and 18 scientific papers in the field of organizational system management.

=== Monographs ===
- Zeremski A., Lazić J.: Organizacija komercijalnih RTV sistema, Economic Institute, Belgrade, 2007, ISBN 978-86-7329-068-3, COBISS.SR-ID 141546252;
- Sajfert Z., Atanasković P., Zeremski A.: Strategija i upravljanje investicijama u funkciji bezbednosti saobraćaja, Andrejević Foundation, Belgrade, 2008, ISBN 978-86-7244-701-9, COBISS.SR-ID 148298252;
- Vučenović V., Zeremski A., Lazić J.: Uspešnost menadžera, The Institute of Economic Sciences, Belgrade, 2009, ISBN 978-86-7329-070-6, COBISS.SR-ID 157007372;
- Saša Muminović, Lazar Milićević, and Aleksandar Zeremski: Rizici ulaganja u obveznice i akcije, The Institute of Economic Sciences, Belgrade, 2013.

=== Scholarly articles ===
- Zeremski A.: Menadžersko projektovanje organizacione postavke trgovinskog preduzeća, Belgrade, 2006 - PhD dissertation;
- Leko V., Zeremski A., Leko D.: Kontrola i revizija javnih finansija, Industrija No. 4/2007, Belgrade, pp. 1–24, ISSN 0350-0373, COBISS.SR-ID 238359;
- Zeremski A., Lazić J., Cvijanović J.: Projektovanje organizacije trgovinskog preduzeća, Industrija No. 4/2007, Belgrade, pp. 37–72, ISSN 0350-0373, COBISS.SR-ID 238359;
- Atanasković P., Sajfert Z., Zeremski A.: Investment management and selection of the relevant parameters in the field of safe traffic on level crossing points, IX International Scientific Conference Management Horizonts Visions And Challenges, Kaunas, Lithuania, 27–28 September 2007.; 27–28 September 2007;
- Leko V., Zeremski A., Leko D.: Revizija budžeta kao instrument kontrole javnih finansija, Revizor No. 40/2007, Belgrade, pp. 95–103, ISSN 1450-7005, COBISS.SR-ID 140584199;
- Zeremski A., Lazić J., Cvijanović J.: Osnovni funkcijogrami komercijalne TV, Industrija No. 1/2008, Belgrade, pp. 43–50, ISSN 0350-0373, COBISS.SR-ID 238359;
- Sajfert Z., Atanasković P., Zeremski A.: Upravljanje izradom generalnih projekata u železničkoj infrastrukturi, XII International Symposium on Project Management YUPMA 2008, Zlatibor, 14–16 May 2008; Proceedings pp. 472–475, ISBN 978-86-86385-03-1, COBISS.SR-ID 148365068;
- Atanasković P., Žarković M., Đorđević D., Zeremski A.: Upravljanje tehnološkim procesima i ekonomski efekti u graničnim stanicama, XIII ŽELKON 08, Niš, 09-10 October 2008; Proceedings pp. 121–124, ISBN 978-86-80587-78-3, COBISS.SR-ID 151498764;
- Zeremski A., Lazić J., Cvijanović J.: Sigurnost putnih prelaza, Industrija No. 4/2008, Belgrade, pp. 33–47, ISSN 0350-0373, COBISS.SR-ID 238359;
- Lazić J., Cvijanović J., Zeremski A.: Neke kontingentne determinante organizacione strukture, Industrija No. 1/2009, Belgrade, pp. 43–55, ISSN 0350-0373, COBISS.SR-ID 238359;
- Atanasković P., Nikoličić S., Zeremski A., Petrović D.: Produženo bavljenje vlakova s procenom troškova u graničnoj postaji Šid, XVI International Scientific Symposium on Transport Systems 2009, Opatija, 23–24 April 2009; Suvremeni promet Vol. 29 No. 3-4 2009, May/August 2009, pp. 265–269, ISSN 0351-1898;
- Lazić J., Cvijanović J., Zeremski A.: Infrastrukturna podrška QMS, Industrija No. 3/2009, Belgrade, pp. 21–58, ISSN 0350-0373, COBISS.SR-ID 238359;
- Knežević S., Cvijanović J., Zeremski A.: Upravljanje konfliktima u makroorganizacionim promenama, Industrija No. 1/2010, Belgrade, pp. 43–68, ISSN 0350-0373, COBISS.SR-ID 238359
- Vladimir Mićić, Aleksandar Zeremski: Deindustrijalizacija i reinindustrijalizacija privrede Srbije, Vol. 39, No. 2/2011, pp. 51–68 M24
- Željko Račić, Lidija Barjaktarević, Aleksandar Zeremski: Analiza uticaja zaduženosti na profitabilnost uspešnih domaćih kompanija u uslovima ekonomske krize, Industrija, Vol. 39, No. 3/2011, pp. 45–60 M24
- Velizar Golubović, Aleksandar Zeremski: Model nominalno određenih doprinosa i reforma penzijskog sistema, Industrija, Vol. 39, No. 3/2011, pp. 207–222 M24
- Slađana Benković, Slađana Barjaktarević Rakočević, Aleksandar Zeremski: Participation of financial institutions in project financing of infrastructure projects, Vol. 40, No. 1/2012, pp. 149–172 M24
- Ivana Bulut, Bojana Redenković Šošić, Aleksandar Zeremski: Tourist destination branding on social networks, Industrija Vol. 40, 2/2012, pp. 157–174 M24
