= Naruki Matsukawa =

Japanese actor

- Born: Naruki Matsukawa 松川 尚瑠輝; September 20, 1991 (age 35); Tokyo, Japan
- Years active: 1997–present
- Website: https://www.stardust.co.jp/talent/section1/matsukawanaruki/

Naruki Matsukawa (松川 尚瑠輝, Matsukawa Naruki) (born September 20, 1991) is a Japanese actor. He was born in Tokyo, Japan.

== Filmography ==
=== Television ===
- The Queen's Classroom (2005), Yūsuke Manabe
- Black Pean (2018), Tatsuya Kitajima
- Idaten (2019), Mikio Oda
- The Tiger and Her Wings (2024), Yūji Inagaki

=== Film ===
- Electric Dragon 80.000 V (2001)
