= Kamata Prelude =

- Directed by: Ryutaro Nakagawa ("Kamata Lament"); Mayu Akiyama ("Nomikawa Rhapsody"); Yuka Yasukawa ("Dead End People"); Hirobumi Watanabe ("Where Are You Going, Coelacanth?")
- Written by: Ryutaro Nakagawa ("Kamata Lament"); Mayu Akiyama ("Nomikawa Rhapsody"); Yuka Yasukawa ("Dead End People"); Hirobumi Watanabe ("Where Are You Going, Coelacanth?")
- Produced by: Urara Matsubayashi
- Starring: Urara Matsubayashi; Sairi Ito; Kumi Takeuchi; Mayuko Fukuda; Kotone Furakawa; Yoshimasa Kondo; Ren Sudo; Shima Ohshini; Misa Wada; Kaito Yoshimura; Noa Kawazoe; Takeshi Yamamoto; Ryutaro Ninomiya; Hazuki Asahi; Riko Hisatsugu; Hirobumi Watanabe
- Production companies: ENBU Seminar; Foolish Piggies Films; Wa Entertainment; MOTION GALLERY STUDIO; TBS Glowdia
- Distributed by: Wa Entertainment; MOTION GALLERY STUDIO
- Release date: 25 September 2020
- Running time: 117 minutes
- Country: Japan
- Language: Japanese

Kamata Prelude (Japanese: 蒲田前奏曲) is a 2020 Japanese anthology film starring Urara Matsubayashi, Sairi Ito, Kumi Takeuchi, Mayuko Fukuda and Kotone Furakawa. It is composed of four segments written and directed by Ryutaro Nakagawa, Mayu Akiyama, Yuka Yasukawa and Hirobumi Watanabe, three of which feature Machiko, an actress.

== Cast ==
- Urara Matsubayashi as Machiko Kamata ("Kamata Lament", "Nomikawa Rhapsody" and "Dead End People")

=== "Kamata Lament" ===
- Kotone Furakawa as Setsuko Noguchi
- Ren Sudo as Taizo Kamata

=== "Nomikawa Rhapsody" ===
- Sairi Ito as Hona
- Mayuko Fukuda as Mari
- Misa Wada as Shizuka
- Noa Kawazoe as Kotoko
- Hazuki Asahi as Konatsu
- Takeshi Yamamoto

=== "Dead End People" ===
- Kumi Takeuchi as Mizuki Kurokawa
- Shima Ohshini as Aran Majima
- Kaito Yoshimura as Keisuke Mizuno
- Ryutaro Ninomiya as Shinkaro
- Yoshimasa Kondo as Kosuke Itagaki

=== "Where Are You Going, Coelacanth?" ===
- Riko Hisatsugu as Riko
- Hirobumi Watanabe as Film Director

== Production ==
Actress Urara Matsubayashi decided to produce a film on her own based on her own experiences as a woman in the Japanese film industry after consulting Kosuke Ono, her co-producer for the anthology film 21st Century Girl who would go on to serve as an executive producer for the project. She was also inspired by actress Kiki Sugino, who had also begun to produce and direct her own films. Additionally, as an actress, Matsubayashi claimed to have only been able to secure bit parts as of late and that she was unable to make a living through acting alone. She stated that she "wanted to break out of this situation by doing something [herself]." Other factors included her view that there was a lack of films told from a female perspective and her desire to give opportunities to newer actors.

Matsubayashi conceptualised the film as an episodic drama with each segment connected through the character Machiko Kamata, an actress from Ōtawara, who was to be portrayed by Matsubayashi herself. This was inspired by the film Gusto Kita with All My Hypothalamus, a four-part anthology film with each segment revolving around one of four men who are "obsessed" with the same woman. She felt that this episodic format "might interest young people in the Netflix era." Matsubayashi decided to set the film in the Kamata district of Tokyo. The film was titled "Kamata Prelude" in reference to the 1982 film Fall Guy, also known as "Kamata March". Though she initially planned on directing the film itself, she eventually decided on having each of the film's four planned segments be directed by a different director. Matsubayashi approached Mayu Akiyama after watching Rent a Friend. She then approached Yuka Yasukawa, who directed a segment for 21st Century Girl. Also asked to participate were Hirobumi Watanabe, whom she was a fan of, and Ryutaro Nakagawa, a friend of hers. She gave each director much creative control, though she told them to feature a strong female character in addition to the character Machiko and requested that they keep the Kamata setting.

All four segments were shot independently, and the first three were filmed in the Summer of 2019. Akiyama's segment, "Nomikawa Rhapsody", was shot first. She wrote a screenplay revolving around a girls' night out between a group of friends and former classmates, with each individual keeping secrets from the others. Though Machiko is in the group, the main characters are instead Hona and Mari. Akiyama decided to introduce the theme of marriage to the segment as she had found that when she was in her 20s and going to gatherings with former classmates, half of whom had already gotten married, they would largely be split into two "camps" in conversations based on their marital status. She wanted to convey the notion that it is "okay to have diverse views on marriage". Sairi Ito and Mayuko Fukuda, who had first co-starred with each other on The Queen's Classroom, were cast as Hona and Mari, respectively. The other two members of the friend group were portrayed by Misa Wada and Noa Kawazoe. Mastubayashi approached Wada, who she had met at an acting workshop, and offered her the role of Shizuka.

Yasukawa's segment, "Dead End People", was shot second. Matsubayashi had asked her to focus on the MeToo movement as the central theme. In planning the segment, Mastubayashi shared her own experiences as a survivor of sexual abuse in the film industry with Yasukawa, particularly on how those around her looked the other way when she was harassed by a producer, and on how perpertrators would claim in public that they were against sexual harassment. Matsubayashi asked Yasukawa to include an audition scene as she "felt uncomfortable with the idea of a woman being judged by a man." Kumi Takeuchi was cast as the segment's protagonist, actress Mizuki Kurokawa, while Shima Ohshini was cast as Aran Hajima, the director who sexually harasses Mizuki. Yasukawa approached Takeuchi, with whom she had worked with on 21st Century Girl, to offer her the role. Kaito Yoshimura, Ryutaro Ninomiya and Yoshimasa Kondo were also cast. Ohshini ad-libbed most of his lines in the audition scene.

Nakagawa's segment, "Kamata Lament", was shot third. Matsubayashi asked him to have the segment depicting the romance of Machiko's younger brother, Taizo. Nakagawa chose to introduce the theme of war and its impact in addition to the central theme. The segment revolves around Machiko and Setsuko, Taizo's girlfriend, who spends time and bonds with Machiko. It is eventually revealed that Setsuko is in actuality the ghost of a woman who had died in the Bombing of Tokyo, in particular the air raid which destroyed most of the district. The segment begins with a depiction of the air raid. After reading the screenplay, she decided on this segment as the opener. Kotone Furakawa and Ren Sudo were cast as Setsuko and Machiko's brother Taizo, respectively. In portraying the character, Furakawa aimed to have Setsuko feel "out of place" compared to Machiko and Taizo. She struggled with ad-libbing due to her lack of experience in playing a character originating from that era.

Watanabe's segment, "Where Are You Going, Coelacanth?" was shot last. Mastubayashi specifically requested that his segment be made in line with his previous works, and that it "criticise Tokyo-centrism." He initially considered setting his segment in Kamata, though he eventually decided on the city of Ōtawara as the setting, where he typically films. Unlike the other three segments, it was filmed in November. It was shot in black and white as Watanabe was "drawn" to its "fundamental beauty." Watanabe himself plays one of the segment's two main characters, a director who has a conversation with Riko, Machiko's cousin, who is portrayed by Riko Hisatsugu. With the exception of three members of a theatre company, none of the rest of the cast were professional actors, instead being friends and acquaintances of Watanabe. The two children who appear alongside Riko were played by friends of Hisatsugu. Though Machiko was originally meant to make an appearance, scheduling conflicts meant that Mastubayashi was unable to film in Ōtawara and so Machiko had to be written out of the segment. As such, the link between the fourth segment and the others was limited to Riko naming her as her cousin and as an inspiration. Matsubayashi originally planned to divide the segment into 10-minute parts, which would play in between the other segments. However, she later decided to "utilize each director's individuality" and have it play in full as the final segment, feeling that it "made the most sense as a conclusion."

== Release ==
The film premiered on 15 March 2020 as the closing film of the 15th Osaka Asian Film Festival. It opened at theatres across Japan on 25 September.

== Reception ==
Mark Schilling of The Japan Times rated the film 4 stars out of 5 and felt that while it was "something of a patchwork", it "held [his] attention from beginning to end." Harumi Nakayama and Kurei Hibiki of Cinema Today individually gave the film a 4/5 stars rating. Nakayama lauded the subject matter, writing that it is "refreshing to see it deliver such a shocking punch to the industry, particularly in its frank portrayal of the power harassment and sexual harassment that still plagues the entertainment industry." Hibiki felt that the film "showcases the creative talents of the talented directors" and found it largely entertaining. Psychiatrist and film critic Ken Takaoka included the film on his list of the five best films of 2020 that he did not cover in his review column for the Japan College of Social Work.

Takako Sunaga and Kota Yamada of Kinema Junpo separately gave the film a 2/5 star rating. Sunaga felt that Machiko should have remained the protagonist throughout and that the Kamata setting should have been retained. Yamada felt that while each segment is an "arabesque of women's lives" with "interesting" characters, the lack of a consistent theme or motif results in the film being "disjointed". Hiroaki Yoshida, also of Kinema Junpo, gave the film a 1/5 star rating, feeling that it lacks a central theme and that the directors had been given too much creative freedom.

The opener, Kamata Lament, was generally well-received. Nancy Fornoville of Asian Movie Pulse felt that the segment was "maybe the strangest" and that the "way this part is filmed has a documentary feel to it and the main focus is about seeing and be seen." Shigemi Hoshino of Cinemarche called it "nostalgic" and felt that the "old-fashioned atmosphere and retro feel" of its setting is a "highlight". Nomikawa Rhapsody was largely well-received. Schilling opined that while the segment is "on the melodramatic side," it "nonetheless highlights the real, if dated, dilemma of single women who want careers", but "feel the pull of a traditional marriage, subordinate gender role included." Sunaga praised the segment and considered the argument between Ito and Yamamoto's characters "something special." Fornoville felt that this was the "most accessible" of the four segments due to the "universality" of its subject matter. Hoshino praised Ito's "passionate" performance and the characterisation of her character, and opined that the segment was both relatable and inspiring.

Dead End People was generally hailed as a highlight by critics. Schilling proclaimed this the "strongest" segment, lauding the "taut" direction and "spot-on performances", highlighting Takeuchi's "eloquent" meltdown. Sunaga felt that this segment was a highlight. Hoshino lauded Takeuchi's "passionate", as well as "powerful and tenacious" performance, concluding that the segment was a "heart-warming expression of small resistance to these problems and to a society that tolerates sexual harassment." Fornoville considered this episode the "most shocking", opining that its style, sound effects and score "leaves the viewer uncomfortable and angry much like Machiko and Kurokawa."

Critical reception to the closer, Where Are You Going, Coelacanth?, was polarised. Schilling considered this the "funniest and most charming" segment. Fornoville wrote that it "gives an answer to those still wondering what Urara Matsubayashi’s motivation was for tackling these problems and taking a stance." Hoshino called it "unique", praised the central performances and felt that the segment's ending is "beautiful". Conversely, Sunaga felt that in deviating from the previous segments through the absence of Machiko and the change in setting, the segment "ruins the whole thing."
