= Giuseppe Vaccarini =

Personal details
- Born: 13 September 1952 (age 73) Miradolo Terme (Pv) Italy
- Occupation: Sommelier

Giuseppe Vaccarini (born 13 September 1952 in Miradolo Terme, province of Pavia, Lombardy, Italy), is an Italian sommelier, winner of the Best Sommelier of the World A.S.I. 1978 competition and President for two mandates, from 1996 to 2004, of the Association de la Sommellerie Internationale.

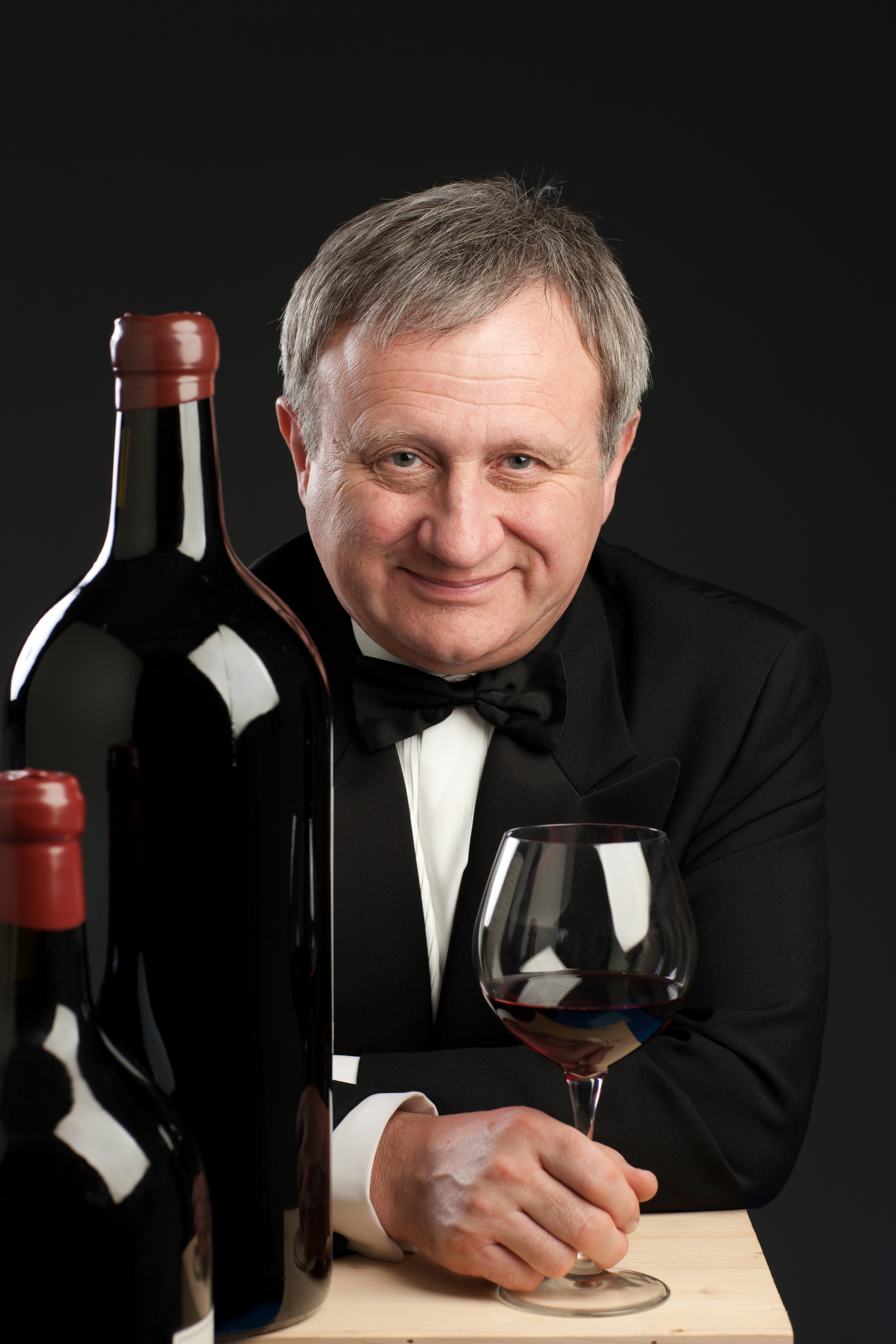
Giuseppe Vaccarini

== Biography ==
Giuseppe Vaccarini obtained the high level degree diploma of « Hotel Technicien Activities » and the professional diplomas in « Restaurant skills and Cook » At the beginning of his career he starts different work experiences which the most significant were those as Sommelier and then Restaurant Manager of « Gualtiero Marchesi » in Milan, from 1978 to 1983, and the one as General Manager of the Locanda dell'Amorosa in Sinalunga, province of Siena. After these he had new experiences in Venice at the « La Regina » restaurant, back in Milan at the Russian restaurant-bistrot "Yar" and in Son Bou on the island of Menorca (Spain) at the « Opera » restaurant. Parallelly, Giuseppe Vaccarini begins his carrière as teacher at the Istituto Alberghiero Carlo Porta of Milan where, in the first years he will teach "Hotels & restaurant technologies" and then the course of "Technique and practise of the Restaurant&Bar skills", and finally end on the "Sommellerie" course of which he was the founder. The role of Vaccarini as teacher is not limited to the milanese High Hotel School but it is marked of several collaborations with the Italian Universities of Lecce, SDA Bocconi in Milan and Università Cattolica del Sacro Cuore of Piacenza, as well as the Universities of other Countries: Peru, Brazil, Mexico, South Korea and Vietnam, having gastronomy, œnology and sommellerie as main subjects. In 2002, at the end of his three years mandate at the A.I.S. (Associazione Italiana Sommeliers) Presidency, he received the University Honoris Causa in "Wine and Food Advice" by the Politecnico of Business Studies of the University of Lugano (CH). From 1990 to 2006 he has been member of the Technical committee of the Thophée Ruinart pour le Concours du Meilleur Sommelier d'Europe and of the Technical Committee for the Best Sommelier of the World, competitions sponsored by A.S.I. (Association de la Sommellerie Internationale), of which Vaccarini has been General Secretary from 1987 to 1990, and President for two mandates, from 1996 to 2004. In June 2007 Giuseppe Vaccarini has founded ASPI, the Associazione della Sommellerie Professionale Italiana of which he is the President. Vaccarini is also qualified journalist in oenogastronomy. He collaborated and he is collaborating since longtime with prestigious Italian magazines as La Cucina Italiana, Ristorazione & Catering, Civiltà del Bere, La Grande Cucina Professionale & Wine, Bar Giornale, Tempi, as well as international magazines as: The Sommelier, Sommeliers International, Four, ecc.

== Bibliography ==
- Il Manuale della Birra, G.Vaccarini, Ed. Hoepli, Milano 2015
- Non solo sala, P. Ceccato, G. Vaccarini, Ed. Grafica Veneta, Trebaseleghe, 2013
- Il Manuale del Sommelier, S. De Nicola, A. Garofolin, M. Larentis, B. Pilzer, G. Vaccarini, Ed. Giovanni Enrico Hoepli, 2012
- Banqueting&Catering, arte, scienza, tecnologia, R. De Giuseppe, F. Luise, V. Matarrese, L. Parolari, A. Quagliarella, G. Vaccarini, Ed. Biblioteca Culinaria, Lodi, 2009
- Coffee Codex, G. Vaccarini, C. Moriondo, ed. Nespresso, 2009 e 2012
- Il nuovo Codice del Gelato, G. Vaccarini, Ed. Giunti Editore, Firenze, 2009
- Water Codex I, II, III, Ed. Sanpellegrino-Acqua Panna International Business Unit, 2005
- Manuale del Sommelier: come conoscere, apprezzare e valutare il vino e come gestire la cantina, Ed. Giunti Editore, Firenze, 2005
- Il DOC San Colombano, G. Vaccarini, E. Grignani, G. Montaldo, F. Carenzi, Ed. EGRI & Associati, 1999
- Sommelier, profession of the future, Ed. Association de la Sommellerie Internationale, 1998
- Tecnica del Servizio di Sala-Bar, vol. 1 e 2, Ed. Lucisano, Milano, 1998
- Formaggi e vini, G. Vaccarini, C. Moriondo, Ed. Bibliotheca Culinaria, Lodi, 1998
- L'Arte del Fiammeggiare e del Trinciare in Sala, G. Vaccarini, A. Ghilardi, Ed. Bibliotheca Culinaria, Lodi, 1996
