= Flare (film) =

- Poster
- フレア
- Directed by: Yūkichi Ōtsuka
- Screenplay by: Yūkichi Ōtsuka
- Produced by: Alexandre Bartholo
- Starring: Mayuko Fukuda; Valentin Bonhomme; Alice Hirose
- Cinematography: Robin Entreinger
- Music by: Yasuyoshi Suzuki
- Distributed by: Eye Motion
- Release date: April 26, 2014
- Running time: 94 minutes
- Countries: France; Japan
- Languages: English; French; Japanese

Flare (フレア) is a 2014 French-Japanese film directed by Yūkichi Ōtsuka. Japanese actress, Mayuko Fukuda played the lead role. It was released on April 26, 2014.

== Plot ==
Flare, seventeen-year-old, ran away from home and came to Yokohama. She had been abused by her mother. After finishing her part-time job of handing out tissues, she was resting in front of a Lawson when she was approached by a man who appeared to be a photographer. "Can I take your picture?" She was expecting to be paid, but he didn't have money. He gave her his business card and said he would give her a copy of the photos. Jean Ozone, 40 years old. The next day she went to the studio. A black-and-white photo of herself making a peace sign seemed nice. He treated her to dinner that day and let her stay on his couch. She started to work as a live-in assistant.

Jean's photographs did not sell well. Even so, he stubbornly maintained his stance of "only taking pictures of what I want to take pictures of". He never took flyers or advertisements. He drank alcohol in the morning even though he had no money, and he was slutty with women. He was also in debt to his patron Johnnie, his ex-wife Miyuki, and a black market bank, and he couldn't keep his head above water. He had no choice but to sell his precious cameras. Johnnie abandoned him, and Sato, a black market money lender, came to the studio every few days to collect money from him. Seeing this, Flare lied that she borrowed the money from her mother and made the money through a dating service. Jean hugged her, thanked her, and took nudes of her. Flare began to sleep in Jean's bed.

A rich monk named Ensai bought Flare's nudes at a high price. Asked to become Ensai's exclusive photographer, Jean said yes for the money. Jean had a bedmate named Erika. She sometimes came to the studio and flirted with him. Erika treated Flare like a child and mounted her in a nasty way. Flare got angry and stabbed her on the buttocks with a fork. An ambulance and a police car came, and Flare was taken to a medical facility.

At the facility, a girl named Saki became interested in Flare's past and started to get closer and closer to her. "You want to meet the old French guy, don't you?" She sneaked Flare outside. When they came to the studio, they found Jean was asking Miyuki to make love by forcefully hugging her. Being disappointed and while they were having tea at a café, Saki was spotted by three girls who seemed to know her, and was taken outside and beaten up. That night they stayed at a hotel and shared a tender kiss. A short time later, Jean came to visit Flare at the facility. When he pointed a camera at her, Flare beat him up. Saki joined in and beat him to a pulp.

After leaving the facility, Flare decided to become a photographer. Jean was going back to France and he sold all of his cameras except his main camera, a Leica, which he left with the owner of the camera store. He asked the owner to give it to Flare when she came. On the day he left Japan, Jean dropped by the gallery where Miyuki worked to say goodbye. Flare showed up there with Jean's Leica. When Jean apologized and expressed his gratitude, tears rolled down Flare's cheeks. After Jean was gone, Miyuki showed Flare a piece of artwork he left with her. It is the picture taken in front of a Lawson on the day they first met. Flare ran out of the gallery and followed Jean's back. But he was no longer there. Instead, she found Saki's smiling face waiting for her.

== Cast ==
- Mayuko Fukuda as Flare Mitsui
- Valentin Bonhomme as Jean Ozon
- Alice Hirose
- Mitsuki Tanimura
- Masaya Kato
- Sayaka Yamaguchi
