= Asuka Kurosawa =

Japanese actress and model

- Born: 22 December 1971 (age 54); Fujisawa, Kanagawa, Japan
- Occupations: Actress and gravure model
- Years active: 1988–present
- Spouse: Sōichi Umezawa (m. 2005)
- Children: 3

Asuka Kurosawa (黒沢あすか, Kurosawa Asuka; born December 22, 1971) is a Japanese actress and gravure model. She has appeared in more than 20 films since 1988.

== Selected filmography ==
=== Film ===
Year	Title	Role	Notes	Ref.
2002	A Snake of June	Rinko Tatsumi	Lead role	
2005	Déracine	Kyoko Tachibana		
2006	Memories of Matsuko	Megumi Sawamura		
2021	Suicide Forest Village			
2022	Intimate Stranger	Megumi Ishikawa	Lead role	
2023	Saga Saga			
2023	Yoko	Kumiko Tachibana		
2023	The Innocent Game			
2024	Performing Kaoru's Funeral			
2024	Ayume	Yuri	Lead role	
2025	Teki Cometh	Nobuko Watanabe		
2026	Cry Out			
2026	Mentor	Naomi Igawa		
2026	Dot to Dot: Will I Be Single Forever?			
2027	Sleeping in the Red Earth	Chiyo Narayama		
2027	The Intertwining	Mizuki Miyamoto		

=== Television ===
Year	Title	Role	Notes	Ref.
1988	Hana no Asuka-gumi!			
1993	Asunaro Hakusho	Tokie		

== Awards ==
She won the best actress award at the Tokyo Sports Film Awards for A Snake of June.
