= Hirobumi Watanabe =

Japanese film director and actor (born 1982)

- 渡辺紘文
- Born: 1982 (age 43–44); Ōtawara, Japan
- Occupations: Film director; actor

Hirobumi Watanabe (渡辺紘文, Watanabe Hirobumi; born 1982) is a Japanese film director and actor. He writes the scripts for and performs as an actor in his films, while also sometimes acting in the films of other directors.

== Career ==
Watanabe was born in Ōtawara, Tochigi Prefecture, and attended the Japan Institute of the Moving Image. He studied under Daisuke Tengan (son of Shohei Imamura) and in 2008 won the grand prize at the 9th Fuji Film Lovers Festival with his graduation film, A Light Pig of August. In 2013, he formed the production company Foolish Piggies Films in Ōtawara with his brother Yūji Watanabe, who produces and composes the music for his films. His 2016 film, Poolsideman, won the Japanese Cinema Splash Best Picture Award at the 29th Tokyo International Film Festival as well as the Nippon Visions Jury Award at the 2017 Nippon Connection. In his review of Poolsideman, critic Mark Schilling wrote of Watanabe's early films that "Hirobumi Watanabe has created a unique cinematic world" with films "all shot in black-and-white in Watanabe’s native Tochigi Prefecture, with music by younger brother Yuji and cinematography by Woohyun Bang. All focus on socially marginalized men with lives that range from the aimless to the mundane. And all are tinged with black humor that keeps the proceedings from becoming too brain-numbingly minimalistic." Watanabe also won the Japanese Cinema Splash Best Director Award at the 32nd Tokyo International Film Festival in 2019 for his film Cry. He was a featured director at the 2020 Far East Film Festival with a screening of four of his films, and also at the 2023 edition with the screening of the world premiere of Techno Brothers

== Filmography ==
- A Light Pig of August (2008)
- Stories of Three Harbors (2009) (omnibus film)
- And the Mud Ship Sails Away... (2013)
- Red Queen (2014) (as actor only)
- 7 Days (2015)
- Poolsideman (2016)
- Party 'Round the Globe (2017)
- Life Finds a Way (2018)
- Cry (2019)
- Kamata Prelude (2020) (omnibus film)
- I'm Really Good (2020)
- Nemuru Mushi (2020) (as actor only)
- Kigeki aisai monogatari (2020) (as actor only)
- Techno Brothers (2023)
- Blue Imagine (2024) (as actor only)
- Rainy Blue (2024) (as actor only)
