= Urara Matsubayashi =

Japanese actress (born 1993)

- 松林うらら
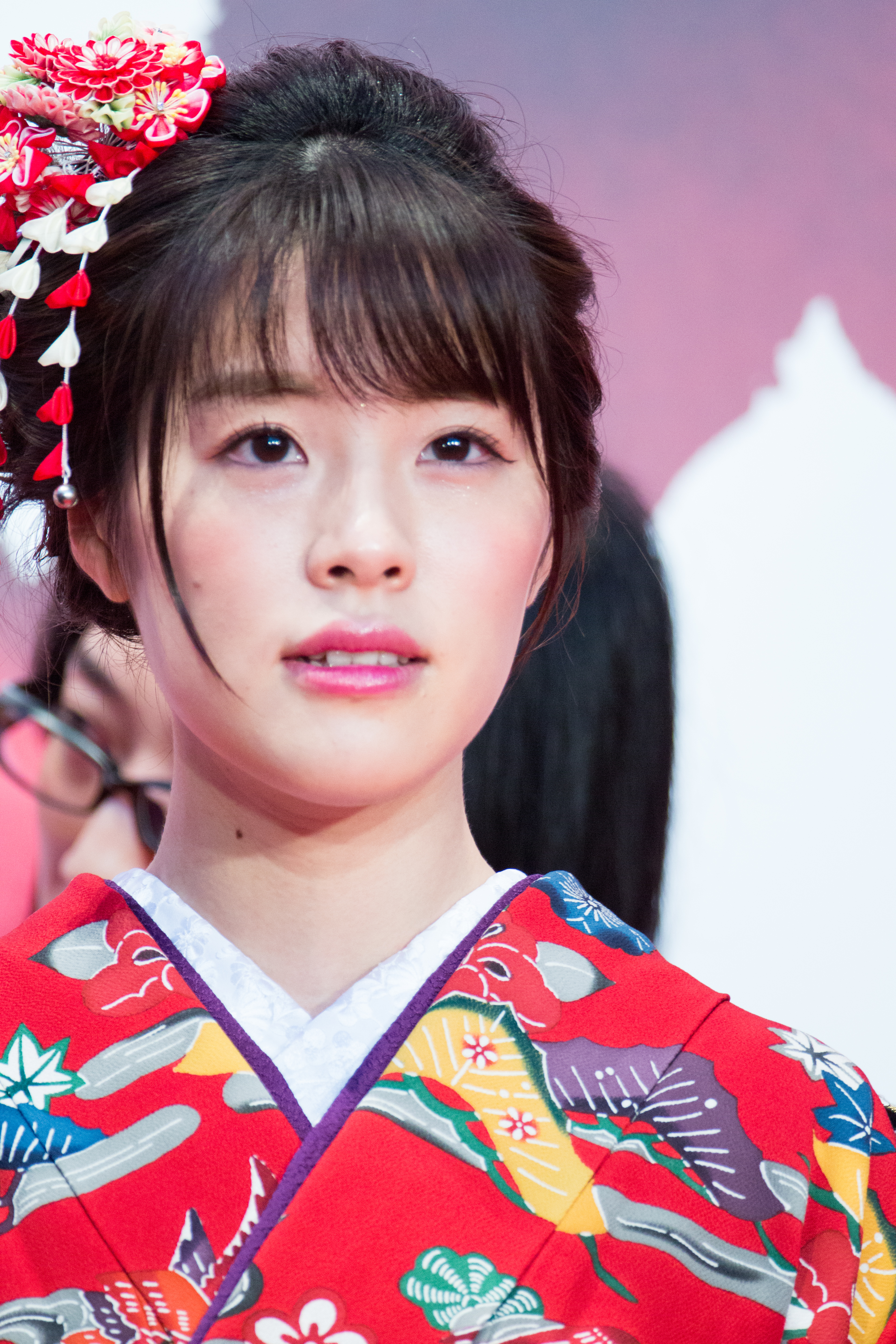
- Matsubayashi at the Tokyo International Film Festival, 2017
- Born: March 13, 1993 (age 32)
- Occupations: Actor, director
- Years active: 2012–

Urara Matsubayashi (松林うらら) (born March 13, 1993）is a Japanese actress and director. In 2024, she directed her first film, Blue Imagine.

== Early life and education ==
Matsubayashi was born in Ōta ward, Tokyo, in 1993. She attended Showa Women's University and graduated with a degree in history and culture in 2015. Her first film was 1+1=11 while she was a college freshman.

== Filmography ==
- 1+1=11 (2012)
- Birthday Card (2016)
- Our Meal for Tomorrow (2017)
- The Hungry Lion (2017)
- 21st Century Girl (2019)
- Kamata Prelude (2020)
- Love Mooning (2021)
- Young Birds (2021)
- Saga Saga (2023)
- Blue Imagine
