= The Queen's Classroom =

- Genre: Drama
- Written by: Kazuhiko Yukawa
- Directed by: Kyōji Ōtsuka; Hitoshi Iwamoto
- Starring: Yūki Amami; Mirai Shida; Naruki Matsukawa; Mayuko Fukuda
- Ending theme: "Exit" by Exile
- Composer: Yoshihiro Ike
- Country of origin: Japan
- Original language: Japanese
- No. of series: 1
- No. of episodes: 11

Production
- Producer: Futoshi Ōhira
- Running time: 54 minutes

Original release
- Network: NTV
- Release: July 2 – September 17, 2005

The Queen's Classroom (女王の教室, Joō no Kyōshitsu) is a live-action Japanese television drama about Maya Akutsu (Yūki Amami), a new teacher at Hanzaki Elementary School who strives for perfection and punishes her students in unorthodox manners. A 12-year-old student, Kazumi Kanda (Mirai Shida), has been able to withstand her strange punishments so far but the other 23 students begin to fold under the pressure.

In the last episode, it recorded the highest viewership rating of 25.3% in Kantō region. On March 17 and 18, 2006, two special prequel episodes were aired, and it recorded the highest rating of 21.2%.

A South Korean remake of the same title starring Go Hyun-jung in the lead role, was produced in 2013.

== Main characters ==
=== Member of Grade 6 Class 3 ===
- Yūki Amami as Maya Akutsu (In the special episode, her name was once changed to "Tomitsuka Maya")

The protagonist, a devil-like and cold-hearted teacher who has just arrived and becomes the teacher of Kazumi’s 6th grade class. Can handle anything flawlessly, including dancing, swimming, nursing, fighting and more. She doesn't smile at any time, and is always as expressionless as a mask of Noh. The only time she smiled is when Kazumi said Aloha to her after she entered middle school, and smiled for the first time behind her back. . Her costume is usually a black high collar dress, a round bun hairstyle, (in the second part of the special episode, it is a ponytail), and light makeup. She makes the class take a test every Monday and who ever has the lowest scores becomes the class representatives who is in charge of cleaning the classroom. Eventually, students who disobey her also become class representatives. After some time, the class knows her goodness.

- Mirai Shida as Kazumi Kanda

An ordinary girl who is in the sixth grade of elementary school and always hopes to create beautiful memories. No matter what, she was unable to understand the meaning behind everything his class teacher did, and at the same time, she continued to be betrayed by friends and classmates she had always considered trustworthy. However, she has always protected her "friends" who betrayed her, and believed that a miracle would happen in her class. And she grew up unknowingly during the "battle" with Maya, and led the whole class to overcome various difficulties. A character who brings a turning point in the plot.

- Naruki Matsukawa as Yūsuke Manabe

He lives with his grandfather who runs a snack shop and likes to dress up as a woman. An extremely cheerful character who often makes jokes, but has a tragic past of being abandoned by his biological mother. Later, he became accustomed to a casual and indulgent life. Although he had such thoughts, he later became the first person in the class who understand Kazumi's thoughts, and he gradually grew up because of this. On the day of the graduation ceremony, he finally reunited with his mother, who had been separated for 7 years (Maya searched for his mother and persuaded her to attend his son's graduation ceremony).

- Mayuko Fukuda as Hikaru Shindō

The first student who complete the test and get full marks. She also has a strong sense of justice and is a genius girl. She became class representative after helping Kazumi to go to the restroom which is forbidden in Maya's rules.However, because her father, whom she liked very much, abandoned her for "work" and she believes she lost her best friend because of her mother, Shindo hated her mother and closed herself in her inner world, isolating herself from the world. However, she had always been cynical, but she regained her original enthusiasm after meeting Kazumi, a true good friend, and together with Kazumi, she led the classmates of Grade 6 Class 3.

- Anzu Nagai as Hisako Baba

A student who have difficulties both in studies and sports. She's introverted and have no good friends in my class. She likes drawing very much. She betrayed Kazumi, who once became her best friend, and became the "monitor" of the class. But later, under the warmth of Kazumi's understanding, she issued a declaration that he would advance and retreat together with Kazumi. She made a significant contribution to the class's graduation production.

- Hikari Kajiwara as Erika Sato

She is Kazumi's best friend. Until Grade 5, she was Kazumi's "best friend" (but they only got together because of everyone's laziness). Sometimes she acts selfish. She stole a wallet from her classmate, but she put the blame on Kazumi, making her miscarriage of justice and being bullied by the whole class. However, after everyone knew that she was the real thief, she became abandoned and prepared to set fire at the school classroom. Fortunately, she was stopped in time by Maya who later arrived at the classroom.

- Shigeru Izumiya as a headmaster

Preceded by Ruri no Shima (16 April 2005 - 18 June 2005)	NTV Saturday Dramas; Saturdays 21:00 - 21:54 (JST)	Succeeded by Nobuta wo Produce (15 October 2005 - 17 December 2005)
