= Andreas Larsson (sommelier) =

- Born: March 18, 1972; Stockholm
- Occupation: Sommelier
- Title: World's Best Sommelier, 2007

Andreas Larsson (born March 18, 1972) in Stockholm is a Swedish sommelier. In 2007 he was elected World's Best Sommelier.

== Biography ==
At 16, Larsson joined a catering school and trained to become a chef. Larsson worked as a chef for seven years. In 1996, while traveling in France, he discovered the world of wine in Burgundy and the Rhône valley. Larsson is currently Wine Director at PM & Vänner in Southern Sweden. Larsson is also involved in consulting, tasting and teaching around the globe. Larsson tastes wine for Decanter.

== Awards ==
- 2001, 2002, 2003: Best Sommelier in Sweden
- 2002: Best Sommelier in Scandinavia
- 2004: Best Sommelier in Europe
- 2007: World's Best Sommelier
