= Mayuko Fukuda =

Japanese actress (born 1994)

- 福田 麻由子
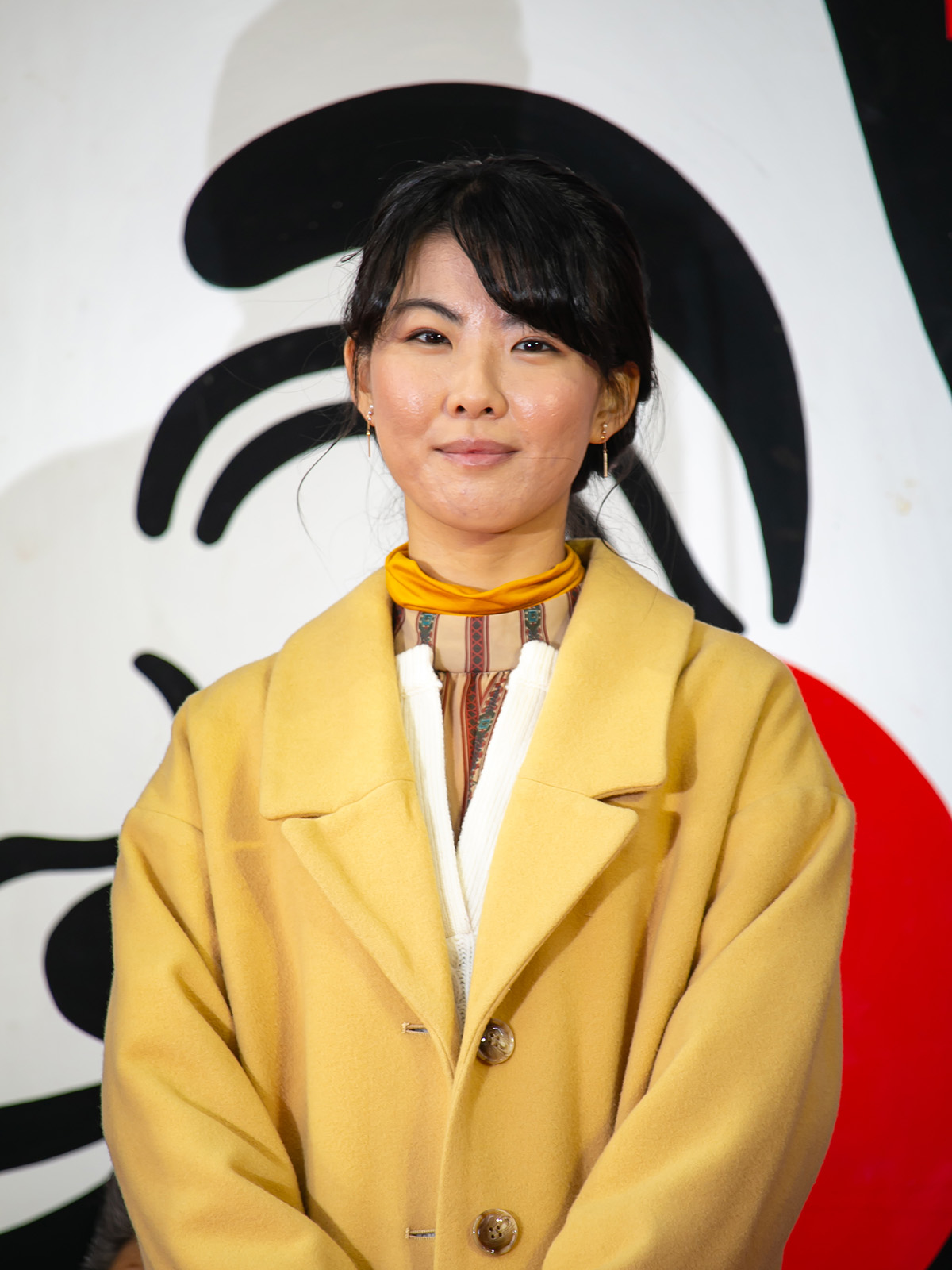
- Fukuda in 2020
- Born: August 4, 1994 (age 32); Tokyo, Japan
- Other names: Mamayu (ままゆ), Mayuyu (まゆゆ)
- Education: Rikkyo University
- Occupation: Actress
- Years active: 1998–present
- Agent: independent
- Website: note.com/mayu_drop

Mayuko Fukuda (Japanese: 福田 麻由子, Hepburn: Fukuda Mayuko; born August 4, 1994) is a Japanese actress who made her debut in 1998. She was managed by the talent agency FLaMme.

Her father, Kenji Fukuda, is a drummer in the band Kasutera when Fukuda's father attended Waseda University in Tokyo after he moved from Shūnan, Yamaguchi. Now Kenji Fukuda works at a IT Company in Tokyo.

== Filmography ==
=== Television dramas ===
- Summer Snow (TBS) (2000)
- Yoiko no Mikata (NTV) (2003)
- Ai no Ie (NHK) (2003)
- Hikari to Tomo ni... -Jiheijōshi o Kakaete- (NTV) (2004)
- Last Present: Musume to Ikiru Saigo no Natsu (NTV) (2004)
- Honto ni atta Kowai no Hanashi (2004, CX)
- Emergency room 24hours 3 (2005, CX)
- The Queen's Classroom (Joō no Kyōshitsu) (2005, NTV)
- Hotaru no Haka (2005, NTV)
- Journey Under the Midnight Sun (2006, TBS)
- Teru Teru Ashita (2006, EX)
- Chibi Maruko-chan (2006, CX)
- Saikai: Yokota Megumi-san no Negai (2006, NTV)
- Sono Gofun Mae (2006, NHK)
- Enka no Joō (2007, NTV)
- Serendipity no Kiseki (2007, NTV)
- Matsumoto Kisaburō Ikka Monogatari: Ojiisan no Daidokoro (2007, CX)
- Arigatou! Champy (2008, CX)
- Kiri no Hi (2008, NHK)
- Soka, Mo Kimi wa Inai no ka (2009, TBS)
- Zettai Reido (2010, CX, episode 5)
- Miporin no Ekubo (2010, NTV) (2010)
- Q10 (2010, NTV) (2010)
- Soredemo, Ikite Yuku (2011, CX) (2011)
- Pandora 3 (2011, WOWOW)
- Future Diary (2012, TBS)
- Scarlet (2019–20, NHK)

=== Television variety shows ===
- Sujinashi (BSN, TBC, NBC) (2006)

=== Movies ===
- Kamikaze Girls (2004)
- Tenshi no Aeba (2004)
- Onaji Tsuki o Miteiru (2005)
- Gimmy Heaven (2006)
- Japan Sinks (2006)
- Yūnagi (2006)
- Little DJ: Chiisana Koi no Monogatari (2007)
- L: Change the World (2008) as Maki Nikaido
- 10 Promises to My Dog (2008)
- Heaven's Door (2009)
- Goemon (2009)
- Sakura, Futatabi no Kanako (2013) as Masami
- Flare (2014) as Flare Mitsui
- Kamata Prelude (2020)
- Good-bye (2021) as Sakura

=== Anime ===
- Piano no Mori (2007)
- Mai Mai Miracle (2009)

=== Stage ===
- Ame to yume no ato ni (2006)
- "Iya mushiro wasurete gusa" (2013)

=== Video ===
- Eri Tanenaka's PV "gerbera" (theme song of Gimmy Heaven)

=== Advertisements ===
==== TV commercials ====
===== 2003 =====
- Nippon Telegraph and Telephone East Corporation (January)
- Zega Toys (March)

===== 2004 =====
- QUOQ Inc. (January)
- Kellogg Corn Flake (June)
- Nihon Kentucky Fried Chicken (December)

===== 2005 =====
- Acecook (March)

===== 2006 =====
- Hoosiers (April – present)

===== 2012 =====
- Olympics 2012

=== Voice-over work ===
- Charlotte's Web – Fern Arable (Dakota Fanning)

== Personal life ==
Mayuko's interests include reading and handicraft, and she can also play the piano. Her favourite artists includes Ayumi Hamasaki, Porno Graffitti and Shiina Ringo.
