= Déracine (film) =

- Film poster
- Directed by: Shun Nakahara
- Screenplay by: Masahiro Kobayashi
- Produced by: Naoya Narita; Kozaburo Sasaoka; Yasuhiko Higashi
- Starring: Eiji Okuda; Asuka Kurosawa; Toru Masuoka; Noboru Mitani; Kenichiro Tanabe
- Cinematography: Hirokazu Ishii
- Edited by: Toshihide Fukano
- Music by: Yoshihide Otomo
- Production companies: Rise Pictures; Root Pictures
- Distributed by: Media Box
- Release date: November 27, 2004 (Japan)
- Running time: 94 minutes
- Country: Japan
- Language: Japanese

Déracine (Japanese: でらしね) is a 2004 Japanese drama film directed by Shun Nakahara and written by Masahiro Kobayashi. The film's title translates to "rootless" in French. It stars Eiji Okuda as a homeless painter named Jouji and Asuka Kurosawa as Kyoko, a young art dealer who becomes his muse. The film also stars Toru Masuoka, Noboru Mitani and Kenichiro Tanabe. Yoshihide Otomo composed its soundtrack. Déracine was theatrically released by Media Box on November 27, 2004, in Japan.

== Plot ==
Jouji Mizuki is a painter. Abandoned by society as well as his wife and children, he has become an alcoholic street dweller. Every day, he wanders around with pieces of cardboard and comes back to his tent having painted several pictures. Using crude art supplies, he paints mundane subjects such as cigarette butts, telephone poles, liquor bottles, roadside trash and buildings. Yet under his hand, they explode vibrantly into life. His fellow homeless people, Aka-chan and Kii-chan, sell Jouji's paintings for 500 yen each, and the three of them share the earnings. Aka-chan and Kii-chan are friendly with Jouji, though he refuses to divulge his past to them.

One day, a woman dressed in a suit and high heels, identifying herself as Kyoko Tachibana, stumbles into them. She is drawn to Jouji and his work, and begins buying one of his cardboard paintings a day. After a few weeks, Kyoko says to Jouji: "I like your paintings. I'll give you some money, and I want you to paint a masterpiece for me." Kyoko reveals that she is a buyer working at Okamoto Gallery. She has ambitions to break away from the owner, Kotaro Okamoto (with whom she is having an affair), and open her own gallery. To achieve this, she needs Jouji's talent, as she claims to be his "discoverer". She also wants to help Jouji break into the art world. However, Jouji flatly rejects her offer, turned off by what he perceives to be her arrogant demeanor. Aka-chan and Kii-chan express their disappointment, but Jouji still stubbornly refuses. After Kyoko leaves, Jouji continues drowning himself in alcohol. His body deteriorates, and he becomes plagued by a serious illness.

As he drinks himself into oblivion, Jouji remembers his past. He had been praised for his genius talent at art school (even being compared to Egon Schiele), particularly for his ability to paint nude women. However, Jouji would have sex with his models and abandon them upon finishing the paintings. After the tragic suicide of the woman who served as his primary model, Jouji was unable to paint. He married and got a job as a salaryman, but even after switching careers, he could not forget about painting. Yet he also could not cope with his depression, and proceeded to drown himself in alcohol and sex. One day, Jouji happened to walk into an art gallery and was deeply struck by Kyosai Kawanabe's "Winter Crow on a Withered Branch." Shortly afterwards, he lost his job due to alcoholism. That night, after staggering into a construction site, Jouji began painting on a piece of wood with a brush that he found on the street. In that moment, he rediscovered his desire to paint, and continued to do so ever since, even after becoming homeless.

That night, as he reminisces, Jouji suffers a seizure and is rushed to the hospital. Kyoko, called by Aka-chan, rushes over. Jouji recovers from the seizure. After paying his hospital bills, Kyoko urges Jouji to paint the masterpiece. Feeling the weight of his own mortality, Jouji agrees to paint her commission.

Kyoko prepares a secluded mountain lodge for Jouji so he will have space and time to complete the work. They live together in the lodge, where they grow closer. However, Jouji's masterpiece does not come to him easily. When he tries painting the lodge's surroundings, he is overcome by his own smallness in the face of nature.

After days of escaping into alcohol, Jouji finally rediscovers inspiration. He decides to try painting a nude once again. Jouji bangs on the door of Kyoko's room, and when she opens it, he declares, "I want to paint you naked." Kyoko cautiously agrees to model for Jouji due to his intense enthusiasm. She hopes this might bring out Jouji's hidden talent. With Kyoko as his muse, Jouji dedicates himself to painting. The two grow even closer through this process. When Jouji has finished, both agree that it is his masterpiece. Afterwards, they have sex in the forest.

On the drive home, Jouji parks his car at a lakeside rest area. On the beach, while gazing at a mountain on the opposite shore, Jouji asks Kyoko to grab his art supplies from the car, saying "I can paint the mountain now." When Kyoko returns with his supplies, she finds Jouji dead. As a tribute to him, Kyoko features Jouji's art at the gallery.

== Cast ==
- Eiji Okuda as Jouji Mizuki
- Asuka Kurosawa as Kyoko Tachibana
- Toru Masuoka as Kotaro Okamoto
- Noboru Mitani as Aka-chan
- Kenichiro Tanabe as Kii-chan
- Makoto Kaketa as Owner of Aoki onsen
- Akiko Kimura as Nurse
- Houka Kinoshita as Doctor
- Miho Miyazawa as Yoko, office worker at Okamoto Gallery
- Satoshi Shinohara as Yakiniku restaurant employee
- Aki Kajiwara
- Masashi Kaneko
- Chieko Misaka
- Rō Naruse
- Gaku Saitō
- Yukinari Yanagino

== Background ==
Lead actor Eiji Okuda is also active as a painter. All original artwork featured in the film was created by Okuda himself.

== Release ==
Déracine premiered at the Aomori Film Festival in 2002. It was theatrically released by Media Box on November 27, 2004, in Japan. The film was later released to DVD on August 26, 2005.

Eirin rated Déracine a PG-12 despite the film featuring nudity.

== Reception ==
In a contemporary review for Show-Hey Cinema Room, Shohei Sakawa praised the performances in Déracine, especially that of Eiji Okuda. He compared Asuka Kurosawa's character to her lead role in A Snake of June (2002), but also stated that it was "a bit of a waste" for her to go completely nude in Déracine "just to be a model for [a] painting." Sakawa concluded that the film was "captivating", but lamented its small target audience and screenings only in "relatively niche theater[s]."

Yuichi Maeda gave Déracine a score of 55/100. He described the film as "an unusual love story", and thought the central conceit of a homeless artist selling paintings in order to survive was "interesting." Maeda praised Okuda's artwork, writing "Each painting is a magnificent work with a unique personality, and just watching the production process is enjoyable to some extent." However, he criticized the film's second half, where Okuda paints a nude of Kurosawa. He believed that the nudity "[became] the main highlight", and that the film's ending was "ordinary and predictable." Maeda concluded that Déracine would play best with a middle-aged male demographic.
