= The Hungry Lion (film) =

- Directed by: Takaomi Ogata
- Written by: Takaomi Ogata; Fuki Ikeda
- Produced by: Takaomi Ogata; Hiroyuki Onogawa
- Starring: Urara Matsubayashi; Atomu Mizuishi; Mariko Tsutsui; Nanami Hidaka; Sakiko Kato
- Cinematography: Kenichi Negishi
- Edited by: Yumi Sawai
- Music by: Makoto Tanaka
- Production company: Paranoid Kitchen
- Distributed by: Geta Films
- Release dates: 27 October 2017 (Tokyo International Film Festival); 15 September 2018 (Japan)
- Running time: 78 minutes
- Country: Japan
- Language: Japanese

The Hungry Lion (Japanese: 飢えたライオン) is a 2017 Japanese drama film directed by Takaomi Ogata, starring Urara Matsubayashi, Atomu Mizuishi, Mariko Tsutsui, Nanami Hidaka and Sakiko Kato.

== Cast ==
- Urara Matsubayashi as Hitomo Sugimoto
- Atomu Mizuishi as Hiroki Fujigawa
- Mariko Tsutsui as Yuko Sugimoto
- Nanami Hidaka as Nanami Oda
- Sakiko Kato as Moe Sasaki
- Tomomi Sugai as Misaki Kinoshita
- Miku Uehara as Asuka Sugimoto
- Daikichi Sugawara as Tetsuya Kondo
- Toshimitsu Kokido as Tsuyoshi Hosono
- Makoto Shinada as Kohei Nishijima
- Gaku Hosokawa as Atsushi Togawa

== Release ==
The film premiered at the 2017 Tokyo International Film Festival on 27 October.

== Reception ==
Justin Lowe of The Hollywood Reporter called the film a "timely critique that will doubtless fall on deaf ears."

Mark Schilling of The Japan Times rated the film 4 stars out of 5 and wrote that with "cool restraint and precision" it "illustrates the process by which the internet destroys, celebrates and forgets a young life touched by scandal."
