= Sae Okazaki =

Japanese model

- 岡崎 紗絵
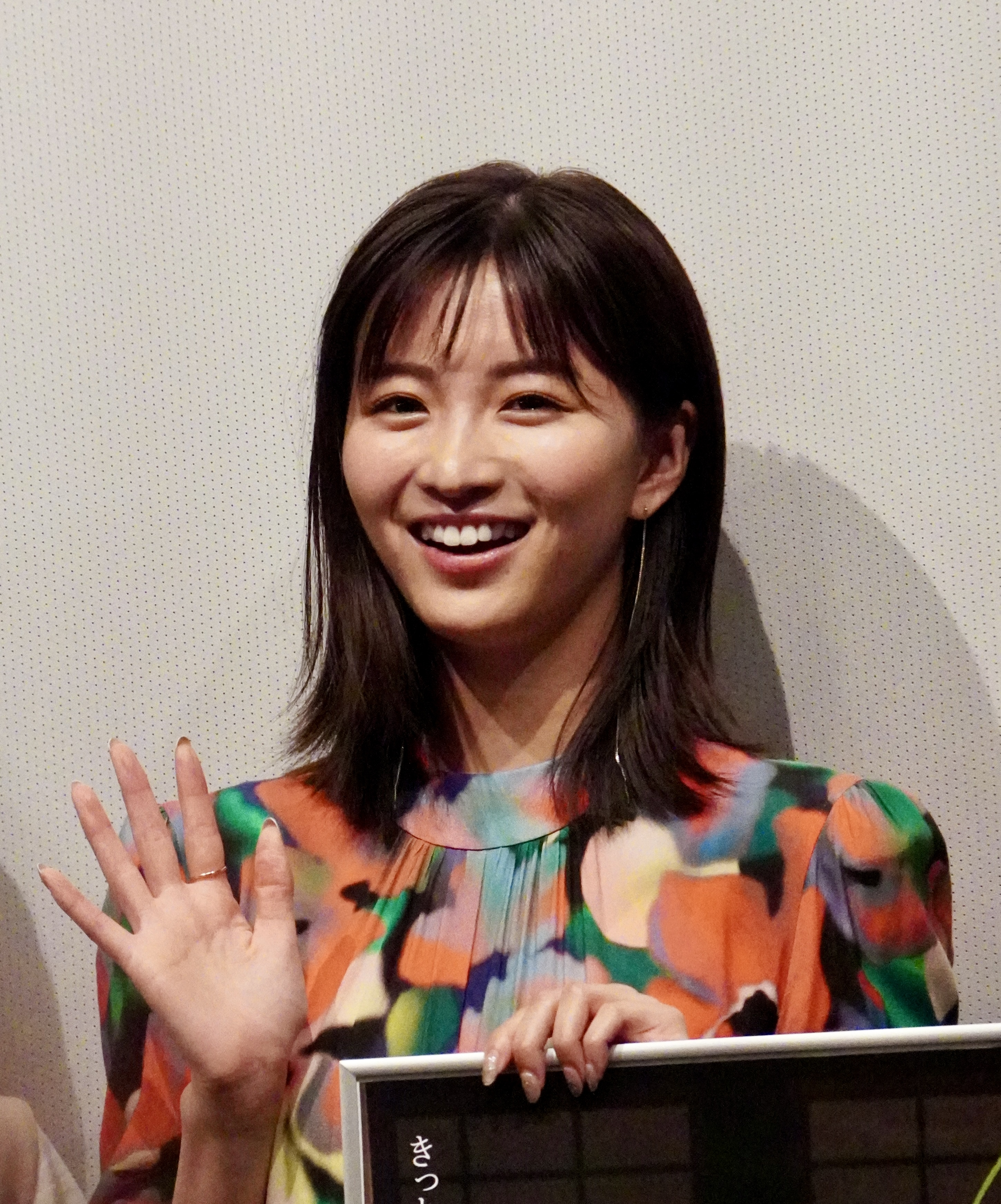
- Born: November 2, 1995 (age 30); Nagoya, Japan
- Occupation: Model
- Years active: 2012–present
- Website: 岡崎紗絵 OFFICIAL SITE

Sae Okazaki (岡崎 紗絵, Okazaki Sae; born November 2, 1995) is a Japanese model.

== Career ==
=== Model ===
In August 2012, Okazaki participated in the "Miss Seventeen 2012" audition for the fashion magazine Seventeen (published by Shueisha). She was selected as a winner alongside Suzu Hirose, Urara Takaseki, and Sachi Fujii from a total of 6,515 applicants, becoming an exclusive model for the magazine.
