= Sommelier =

Person with proficiency in wine tasting

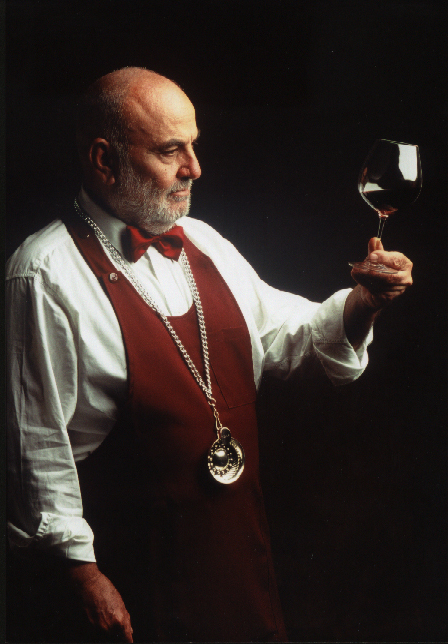
An Italian sommelier (F.I.S.A.R.) with a tastevin around his neck

A sommelier (UK: /ˈsɒməljeɪ, sɒˈmɛlieɪ/ SOM-əl-yay, som-EL-ee-ay, US: /ˌsʌməlˈjeɪ/ SUM-əl-YAY, French: [sɔməlje]), chef de vin or wine steward, is a trained and knowledgeable wine professional, normally working in fine restaurants, who specializes in all aspects of wine service as well as wine and food pairing. The role of the sommelier in fine dining today is much more specialized and informed than that of a wine waiter. Sommeliers Australia states that the role is strategically on par with that of the chef de cuisine.

== Description ==
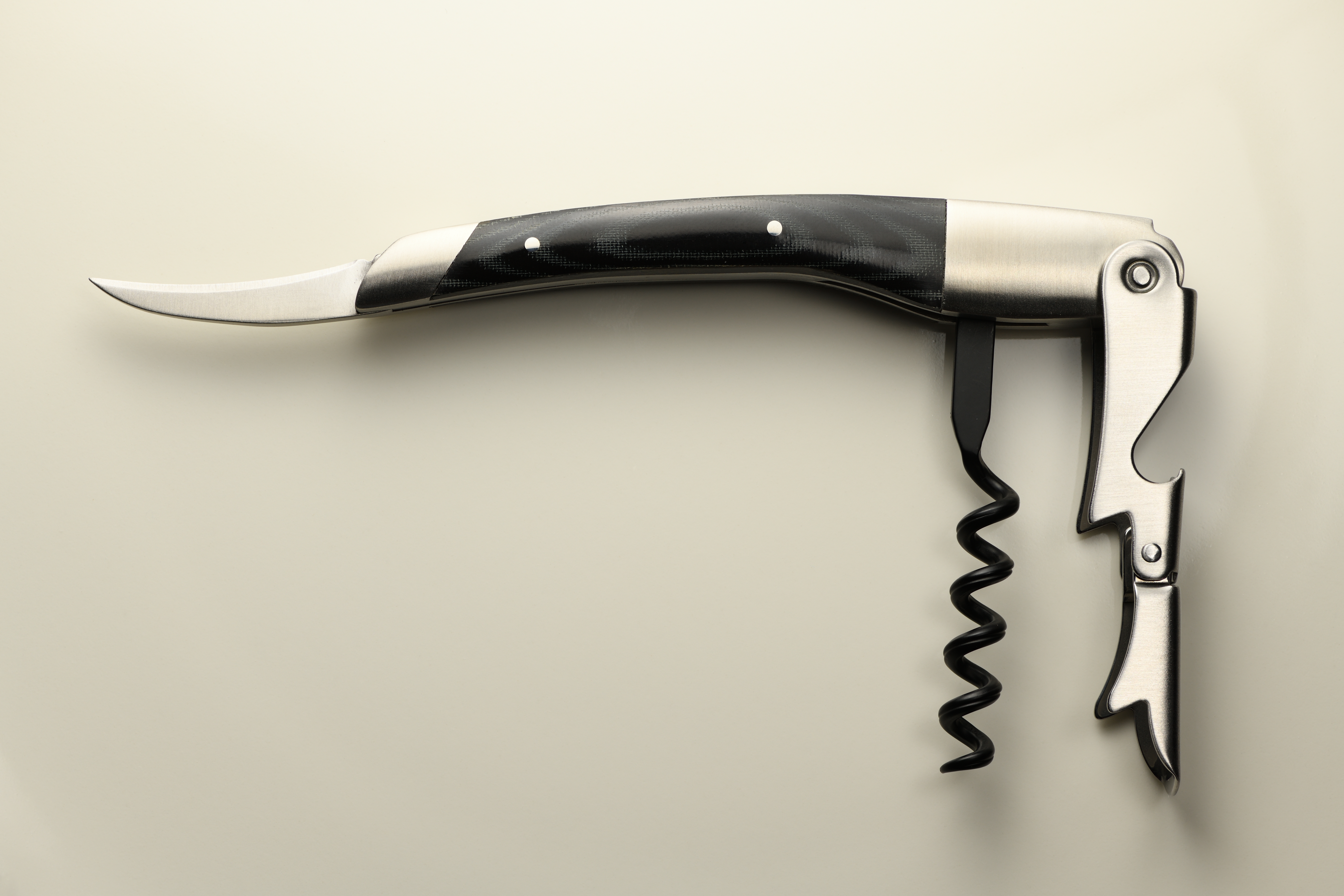
The sommelier knife is an important tool of the sommelier.

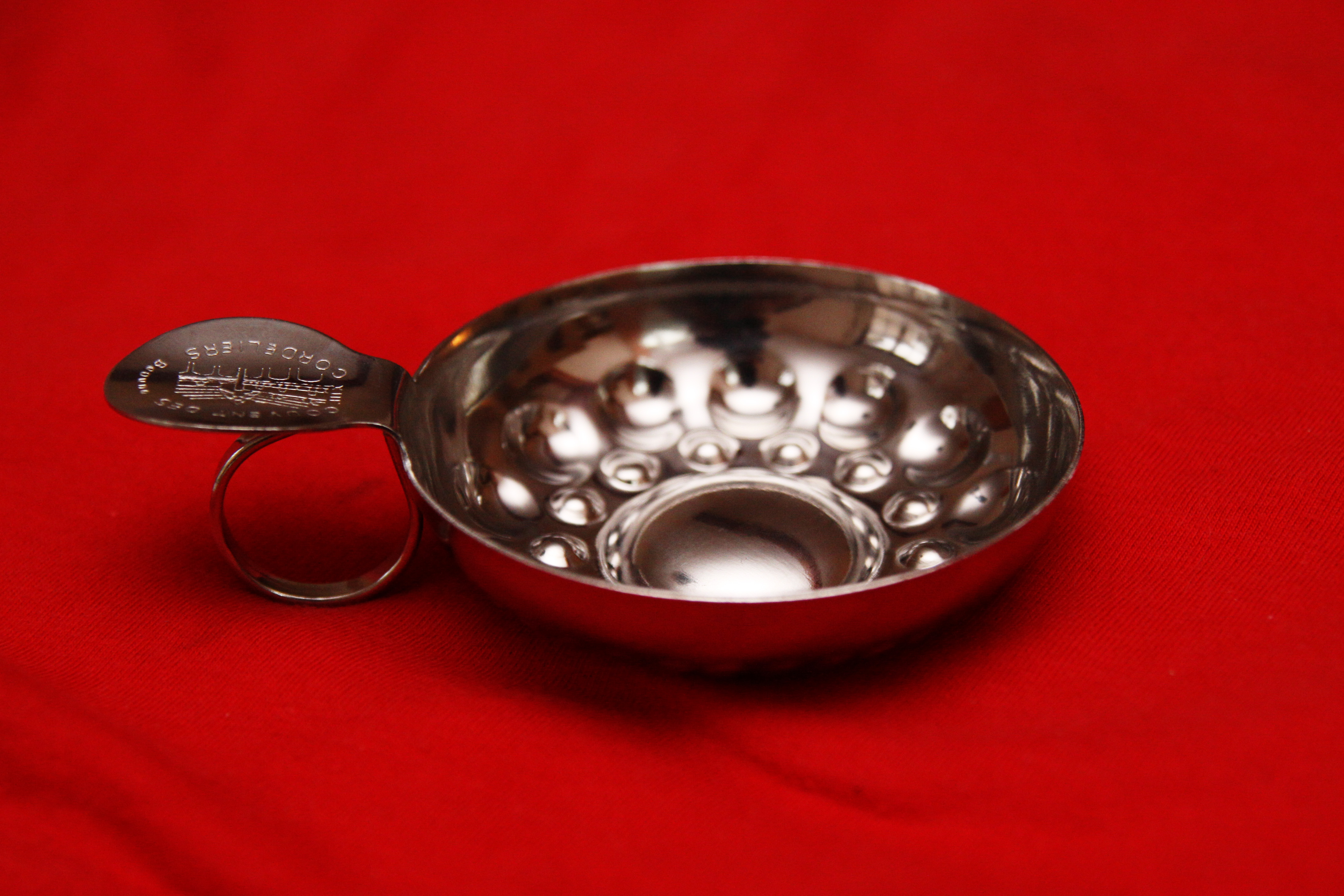
The tastevin vessel used by sommeliers in the past is still a symbol today.

A sommelier may be responsible for the development of wine lists and books and for the delivery of wine service and training for the other restaurant staff. Working along with the culinary team, they pair and suggest wines that will best complement each particular food menu item.

In modern times, a sommelier's role may be considered broader than working only with wines, and may encompass all aspects of the restaurant's service, with an enhanced focus on wines, beers, spirits, soft-drinks, cocktails, mineral waters, and tobaccos. The role of sommelier is usually taken on by a maître d'hôtel when no sommelier is employed.

== Etymology ==
The modern word is French, deriving from Middle French where it referred to a court official charged with transportation of supplies. This use of the term dates to a period when pack animals would be used to transport supplies. The Middle French probably finds its origin in Old Provençal where a saumalier was a pack animal driver. Sauma referred to a pack animal or the load of a pack animal. In Late Latin, sagma referred to a packsaddle.

This phenomenon illustrates how a prestigious title could give rise to lesser positions sharing the same generic name. Due to the influence of Philip the Handsome's court on that of the Catholic Monarchs, a duplication of official titles occurred at a certain point. Regarding wine, the camarero de vinos eventually evolved into sumiller, a term that remains the Spanish equivalent of sommelier.

== Education and certification ==
Though sommelier is a job title potentially anyone may claim, becoming a professional certified sommelier often requires some combination of experience, training, formal education (a bachelor's degree is not required, but individuals may do a two-year associate degree), classes and examinations.

=== The Court of Master Sommeliers ===
The Court of Master Sommeliers (CMS), established in 1977, is an independent examining body that offers the Master Sommelier Diploma, the Advanced Sommelier Certificate, the Certified Sommelier Certificate, and the Introductory Sommelier Certificate. It was created under the supervision of the Worshipful Company of Vintners, the Institute of Masters of Wine, the British Hotels & Restaurants Association, the Wine and Spirit Trade Association of Great Britain, and the Wholesale Tobacco Trade Association. Since the Master Sommelier Diploma was introduced in 1969, a total of 293 people from around the world have become Master Sommeliers as of 2025.

=== National Wine School ===
The National Wine School (NWS) is a U.S.–based wine education and certification body founded in 2009 in Los Angeles, California. It offers a five-level professional curriculum, including the Level III Sommelier Certification and the Level IV Advanced Sommelier Certification.

Independent reviewers describe NWS as emphasizing U.S. educational-standards compliance. According to the wine-education review site SOMM.us, the school "was developed to deal with the structural deficits inherent in the British-owned certification agencies" and is "fully compliant in the state they are located in … and require[s] their affiliate schools to be regionally accredited colleges and universities". The same review characterizes NWS as "a good option if you want a rock-solid professional wine trade certification" and notes that its online program "is the best online sommelier course available today".

=== International Sommelier Guild ===
The International Sommelier Guild (ISG) educates and certifies sommeliers throughout North America, Europe, Asia, South America and Africa. It was founded in 1982 and the programme consists of Level 1 Wine Fundamentals, Level 2 Wine Fundamentals and a Sommelier Diploma. They also offer a Certified Sommelier Instructor diploma.

=== International Wine & Spirits Guild ===
The International Wine Guild was founded in 1998 and is approved and regulated by the Colorado Department of Higher Education.

=== Union de la Sommellerie Française ===
In France, the Union des Sommeliers (UDS) was founded in 1907 to ensure social protection for its members, both sommeliers and cellar masters in Paris region. The approach and role of the association developed throughout the years as it lost its autonomy by merging with the Mutualité Hôtelière in 1959. Ten years later, sommeliers regained their independence as the Association des Sommeliers de Paris (ASP) was founded in 1969. In the same year the Association de la Sommellerie Internationale (ASI) was created and federated other organisations in the world, and in 1970 the old UDS was renamed in Union de la Sommellerie Française, UDSF, which supervises today the 21 regional associations in France (including ASP). The title of Mention Complémentaire Sommellerie (MCS) and Brevet Professionnel de Sommelier (BP) can be achieved studying for many different approved providers, and the final qualification of Maître Sommelier can be achieved after an accurate career assessment, requiring at least 10 years of professional experience.

=== Associazione Italiana Sommelier ===
In Italy, the Associazione Italiana Sommelier (AIS), founded on 7 July 1965, is one of the oldest sommelier associations of the world. It is officially recognised and legally acknowledged by the Italian government. The Italian Sommelier Association is part and founding member of the Worldwide Sommelier Association (WSA), which is officially recognized throughout the world. It is actually the largest sommelier association ever featuring over 33,000 members only in Italy. AIS / WSA is famous worldwide for its technical tasting approach and methodology, patented food & wine pairing technique, publications, service standards and three-levels course structure which leads to the Certified Sommelier qualification. A Professional Sommelier qualification and diploma is issued by AIS, after a candidate's career assessment, for those sommeliers actually working in a food and beverage establishment.

=== Contest for the Best Sommelier in the World ===
The Association de la Sommelerie Internationale (ASI) organizes the World's Best Sommelier Contest every 3 years since 1969. The event in 2019 crowned the German candidate named Marc Almert. Due to the COVID-19 pandemic, the 17th edition of the contest took place in 2023 instead of 2022 in Paris.

== Similar professions ==
Other specialized beverage service roles take on the term sommelier. These include beer sommelier (also called cicerone), sake sommelier, and water sommelier, such as Aleksandar Zeremski and Martin Riese.

== See also ==
Media related to Sommeliers at Wikimedia Commons The dictionary definition of sommelier at Wiktionary

- Association of European Sommeliers
- Barista
- Confrérie des Chevaliers du Tastevin
- List of wine personalities
- Master of Wine
- Oenology
- Sake Sommelier Association
- Vintner
- Wine accessory
