= 2020 in Japan =

- Decades: 2000s; 2010s; 2020s; 2030s
- See also: Other events of 2020; History of Japan • Timeline • Years

Events in the year 2020 in Japan.

The first year was largely defined by COVID-19 pandemic that caused the national economy to go into recession, and would continue until October 1, 2021 (when the fourth state of emergency ends). In addition to various historical events, such as the postponement of Tokyo Olympics (until 2021) and with the end of Shinzo Abe era.

== Incumbents ==
- Emperor: Naruhito
- Prime Minister: Shinzo Abe (until September 16), Yoshihide Suga (since September 16)
- Chief Cabinet Secretary: Yoshihide Suga (until September 16), Katsunobu Katō (since September 16)
- Chief Justice of Japan: Naoto Ōtani
- Speaker of the House of Representatives: Tadamori Ōshima
- President of the House of Councillors: Akiko Santō

=== Governors ===
- Aichi Prefecture: Hideaki Omura
- Akita Prefecture: Norihisa Satake
- Aomori Prefecture: Shingo Mimura
- Chiba Prefecture: Kensaku Morita
- Ehime Prefecture: Tokihiro Nakamura
- Fukui Prefecture: Tatsuji Sugimoto
- Fukuoka Prefecture: Hiroshi Ogawa
- Fukushima Prefecture: Masao Uchibori
- Gifu Prefecture: Hajime Furuta
- Gunma Prefecture: Ichita Yamamoto
- Hiroshima Prefecture: Hidehiko Yuzaki
- Hokkaido: Naomichi Suzuki
- Hyogo Prefecture: Toshizō Ido
- Ibaraki Prefecture: Kazuhiko Ōigawa
- Ishikawa Prefecture: Masanori Tanimoto
- Iwate Prefecture: Takuya Tasso
- Kagawa Prefecture: Keizō Hamada
- Kagoshima Prefecture: Satoshi Mitazono (until 28 July); Kōichi Shiota (starting 28 July)
- Kanagawa Prefecture: Yuji Kuroiwa
- Kumamoto Prefecture: Ikuo Kabashima
- Kochi Prefecture: Seiji Hamada
- Kyoto Prefecture: Takatoshi Nishiwaki
- Mie Prefecture: Eikei Suzuki
- Miyagi Prefecture: Yoshihiro Murai
- Miyazaki Prefecture: Shunji Kōno
- Nagano Prefecture: Shuichi Abe
- Nagasaki Prefecture: Hōdō Nakamura
- Nara Prefecture: Shōgo Arai
- Niigata Prefecture: Hideyo Hanazumi
- Oita Prefecture: Katsusada Hirose
- Okayama Prefecture: Ryuta Ibaragi
- Okinawa Prefecture: Denny Tamaki
- Osaka Prefecture: Hirofumi Yoshimura
- Saga Prefecture: Yoshinori Yamaguchi
- Saitama Prefecture: Motohiro Ōno
- Shiga Prefecture: Taizō Mikazuki
- Shiname Prefecture: Tatsuya Maruyama
- Shizuoka Prefecture: Heita Kawakatsu
- Tochigi Prefecture: Tomikazu Fukuda
- Tokushima Prefecture: Kamon Iizumi
- Tokyo Prefecture: Yuriko Koike
- Tottori Prefecture: Shinji Hirai
- Toyama Prefecture: Takakazu Ishii (until 9 November); Hachiro Nitta (starting 9 November)
- Wakayama Prefecture: Yoshinobu Nisaka
- Yamagata Prefecture: Mieko Yoshimura
- Yamaguchi Prefecture: Tsugumasa Muraoka
- Yamanashi Prefecture: Kotaro Nagasaki

== Ongoing events ==
- COVID-19 pandemic in Japan
- Japan–South Korea trade dispute

== Events by month ==
=== January ===
- January 8 – The country's two largest yakuza gang organization are pdeclared "terrorists", the Yamaguchi-gumi, and the Kobe Yamaguchi-gumi, which split from the former in August 2015, later it was banned in central and western Japan.
- January 11 – A volcano erupted on Kuchinoerabu-jima in Kagoshima Prefecture. No immediate injuries were reported.
- January 15 – The Ministry of Health, Labour and Welfare reported a confirmed case of novel-coronavirus. It marked the second exported case of the 2019–20 coronavirus pandemic and the first in Japan. The patient was discharged from the hospital and the Japanese government scaled up a whole-of-government coordination mechanism.
- January 17 – The silver jubilee of the Great Hanshin earthquake, a memorial service was held in Kobe's Port Island.
- January 22 – Opposition parties lay into Abe over scandals and Mideast dispatch, a controversial taxpayer-funded LDP party, the scandal over the legalization of casinos, and a possibly dangerous dispatch of a JMSDF unit to the Middle East amid high tensions over Tehran's nuclear program.
- January 28 – Japan reports first domestic transmission of COVID-19, one of the new cases was that of a bus driver who had driven two groups of Chinese tourists visiting Japan from Wuhan earlier this month.

=== February ===
- February 1 – Amid COVID-19 fears, Tokyo Olympic organizers try to dampen cancellation rumors. Wuhan coronavirus can be transmitted between humans, posing tougher challenges for the Tokyo organizers to counteract the infectious disease and host a safe and secure games, during China travel ban, 3 years after the Executive Order 13769 (part of the Trump travel ban).
- February 5 – According to the NPA, 18-year-old woman dies after small landslide in Kanagawa, A teenager was killed Wednesday morning when she was struck by a small landslide while walking through a residential area in the city of Zushi, Kanagawa Prefecture, local police said.
- February 6 – Prime Minister Shinzo Abe stated that the 2020 Summer Olympics would or would not be postponed due to coronavirus outbreak, then the lawmakers plans to declare 'war' against coronavirus.
- February 8 – South Koreans least trusting of Japan among six nations surveyed, The proportion of people who trust Japan is lowest in South Korea among six countries covered by a Japanese think tank survey released on Saturday since the 2019–2020 Japan–South Korea trade dispute.
- February 13
  - Noriyuki Makihara was arrested for alleged illegal stimulant possession, as police found 0.083 gram of stimulant at his condominium in Tokyo's Minato Ward in April 2018.
  - Japan announced that a woman in her eighties outside of Tokyo has died in Kanagawa Prefecture. Two taxi drivers also were tested positive.
- February 16 – Shinzo Abe sees Cabinet approval rating log sharpest fall in two years, The approval rating for Prime Minister Shinzo Abe's Cabinet has fallen to 41.0%, a Kyodo News survey showed Sunday, dropping 8.3 points from the previous poll in January and marking the sharpest fall in nearly two years amid ongoing political scandals, after the parliamentary votes.
- February 20 – Minister of the Environment Shinjirō Koizumi says he regrets skipping COVID-19 meeting, on the coronavirus outbreak in favor of a new year party held by a group of his supporters in his hometown.
- February 23 – The Emperor's Birthday for the first time in the Reiwa era, but cancelled due to the coronavirus outbreak.
- February 26 – Prime Minister Shinzo Abe called for sports and cultural events to be stopped for two weeks. This comes after Japan confirmed its second local death, amid concerns the 2020 Tokyo Olympics could be cancelled. Hokkaido will close schools from February 27 to March 4, while Tokyo allowed schools to start some classes later.
- February 27
  - On February 27, Shinzo Abe asked for schools to close across the country to slow the spread of the virus. The duration of the closure he asked schools to adopt were from March 2 until the end of spring vacations, which usually conclude in early April, later postponed to September.
  - IOC President Thomas Bach told Japanese media in a conference call that the IOC "is fully committed to a successful Olympic Games in Tokyo starting July 24" due to a coronavirus outbreak.

=== March ===
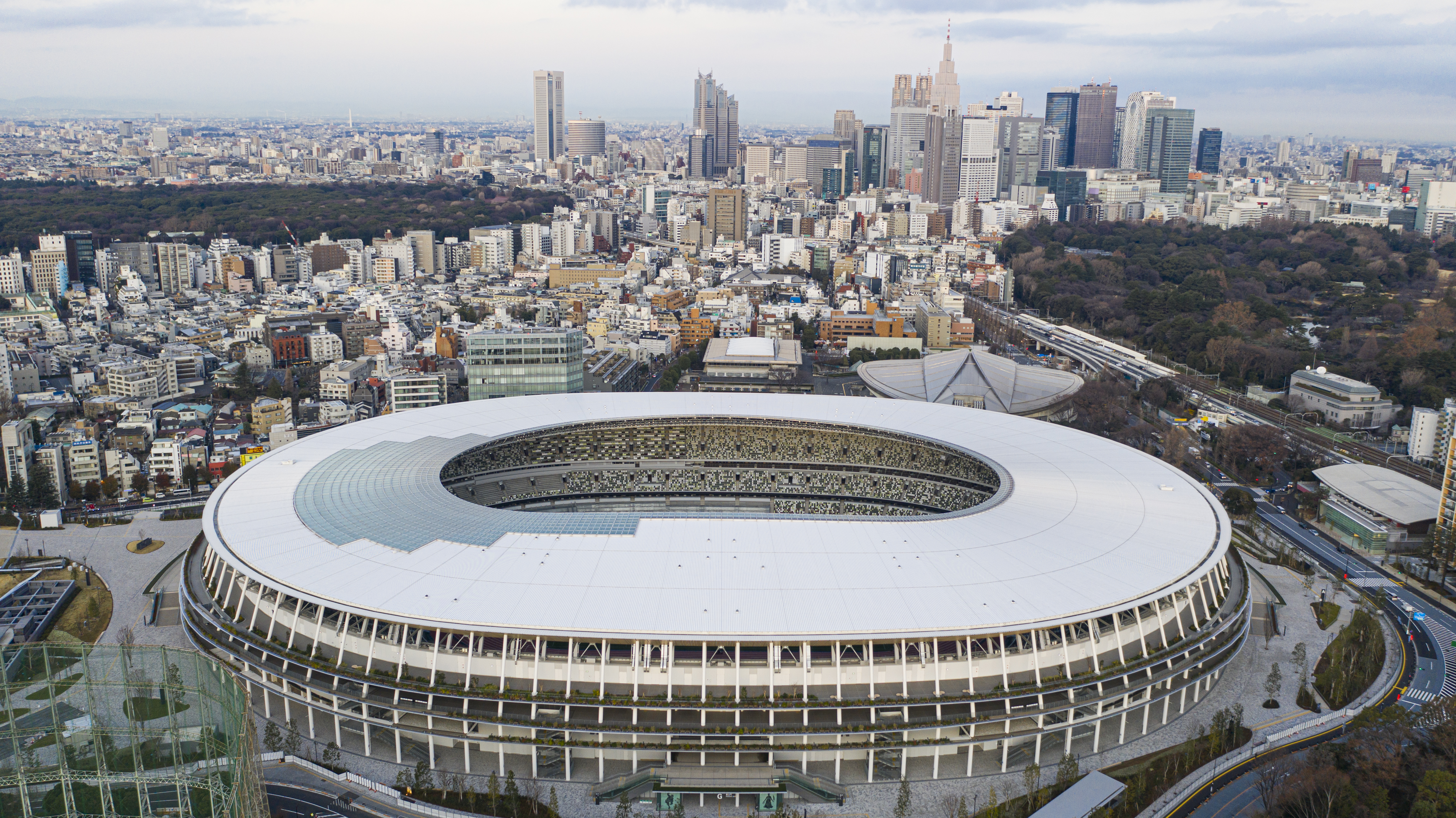
Japan National Stadium, the main stadium of the 2020 Summer Olympics and Paralympics in Tokyo, scheduled to begin on 24 July and 25 August, respectively, were both postponed to 2021 as a result of the ongoing COVID-19 pandemic.

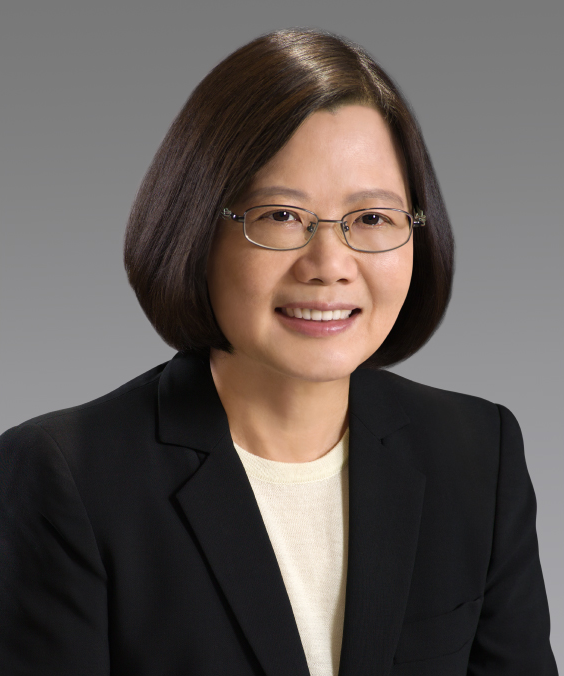
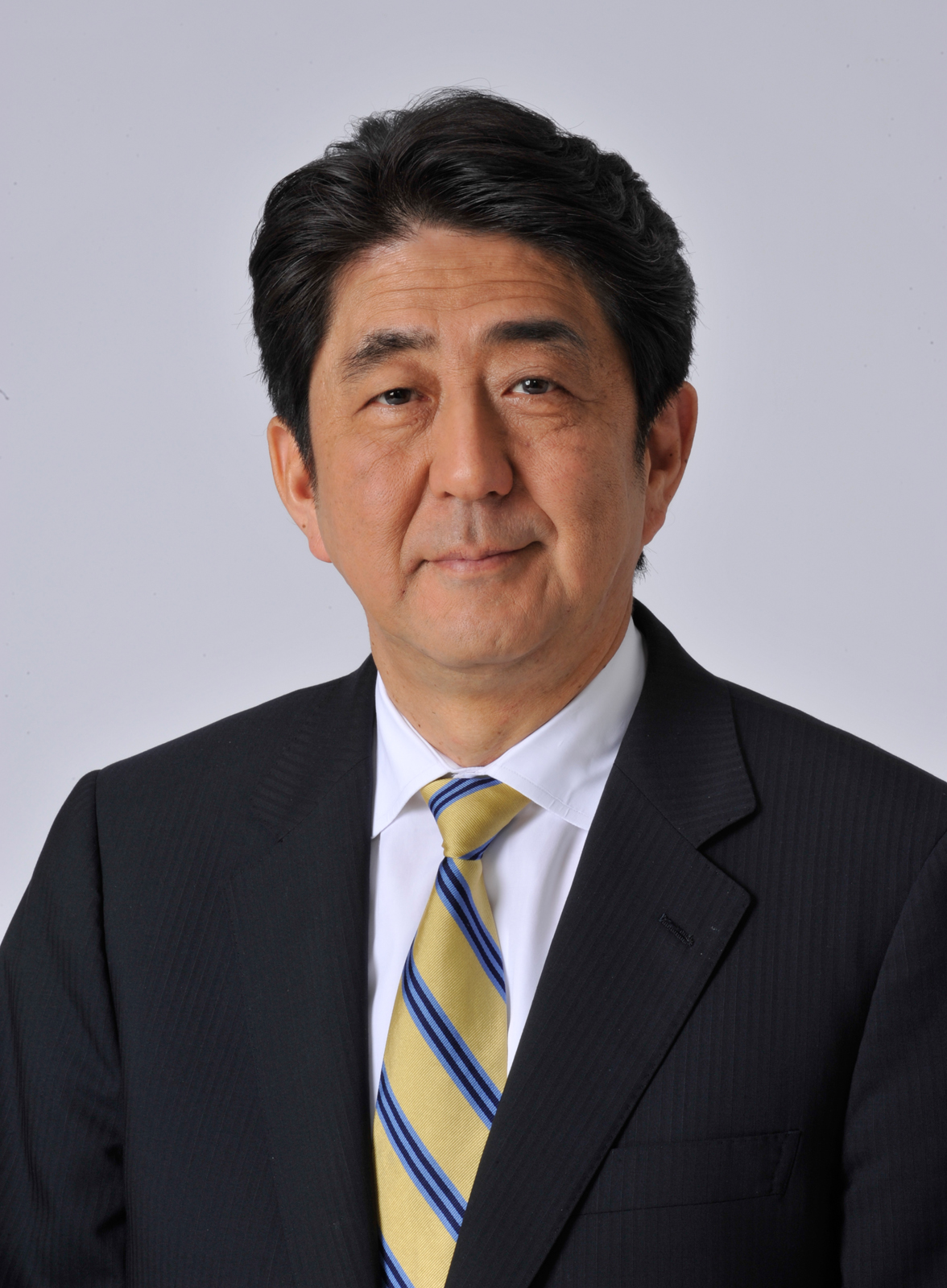
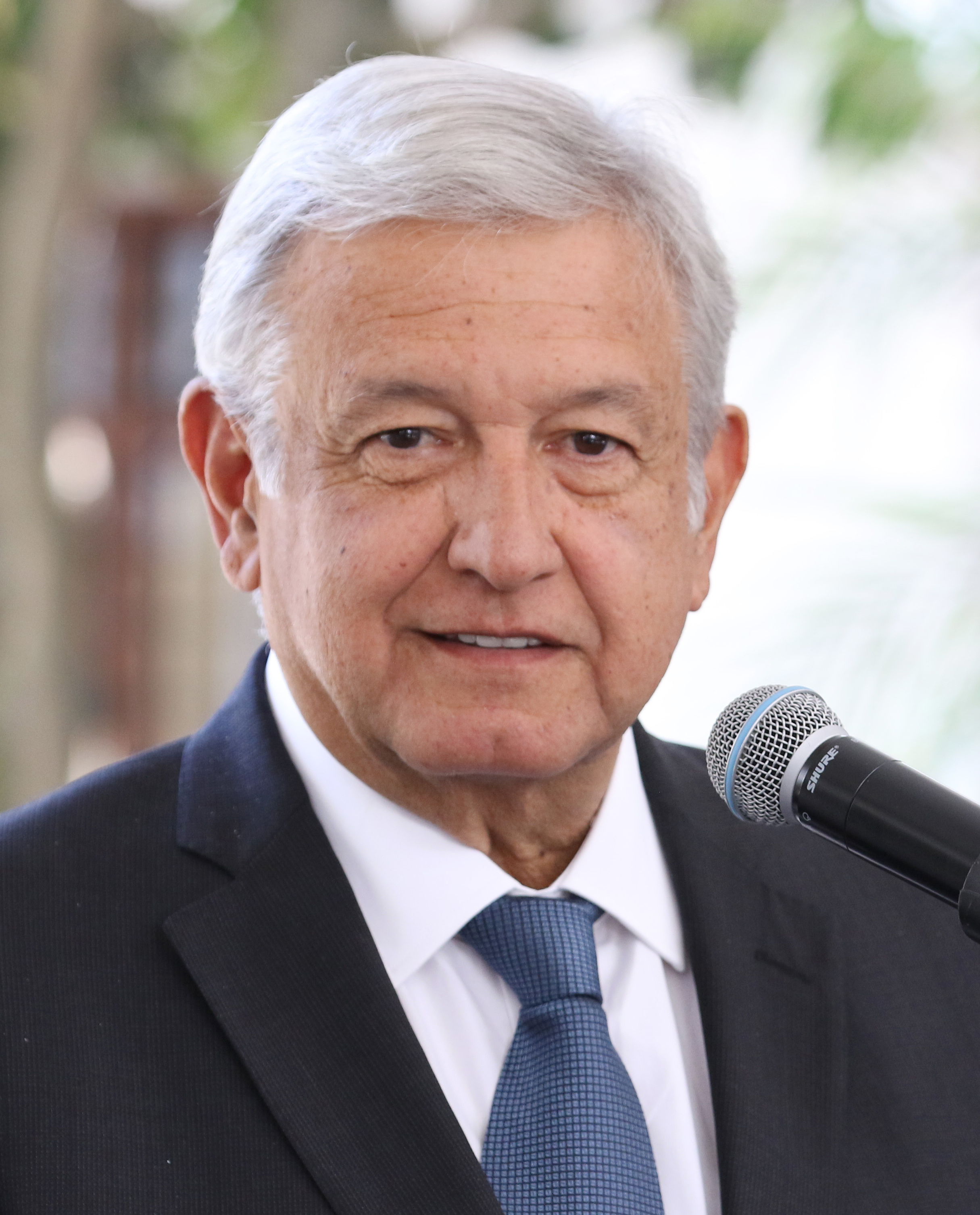
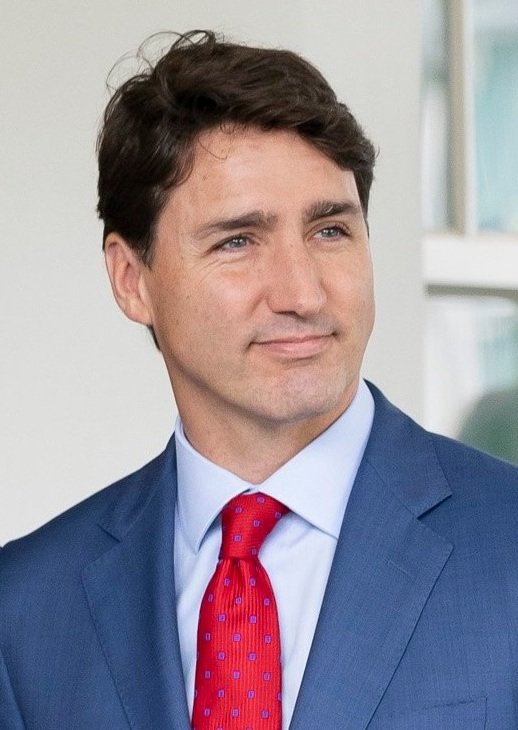
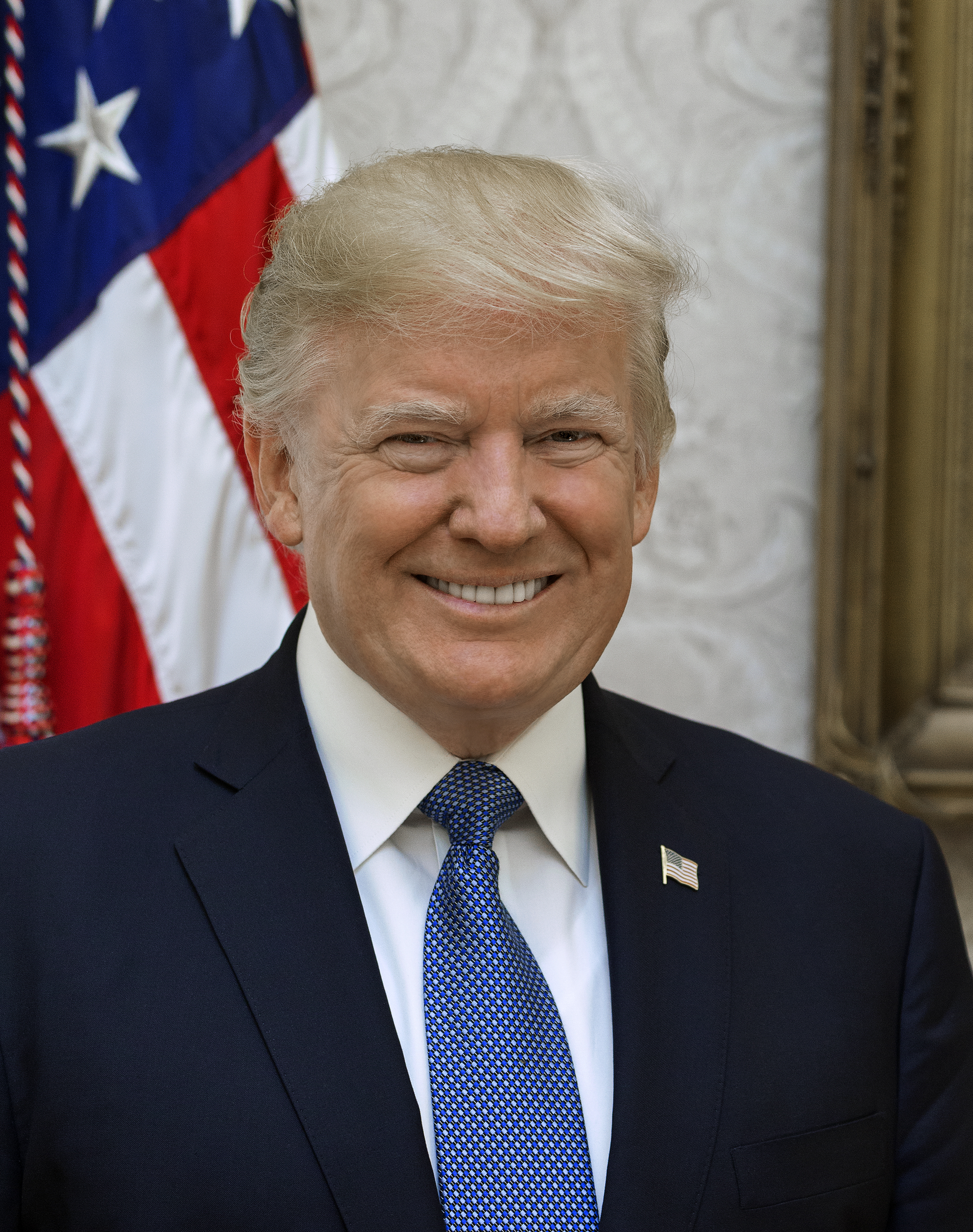
(top row L to R) Tsai Ing-wen, Moon Jae-in, Shinzo Abe and (bottom row L to R) Andrés Manuel López Obrador, Justin Trudeau, and Donald Trump, the East Asian and North American leaders declared a 'civil war' against COVID-19.
- March 1
  - The Tokyo Marathon, held on March 1, was to be restricted to elite runners and wheelchair athletes. Initially, it was expected that 38,000 people would take part but with this change the number will be reduced to 206 participants.
  - The JR Central replaced Tōkaidō Shinkansen's 700 Series Shinkansen with a new N700 Series Shinkansen for the 2020 Summer Olympics and the Paralympics, since its opening during the 1964 Summer Olympics, originally on March 8 due to coronavirus pandemic.
- March 3 – The 2020 Summer Olympics cancellation, postponement not discussed by the IOC president Thomas Bach until March 24.
- March 4 – The 2020 Summer Olympics torch relay could be adjusted to prevent the spread of the virus.
- March 5
  - Prime Minister Shinzo Abe declares 'war' against coronavirus pandemic, like Taiwanese President Tsai Ing-wen and South Korean President Moon Jae-in declared 'war' against coronavirus pandemics. A day after he made a rare call in separate meetings with each opposition leader for cooperation across party lines, the ruling and opposition parties agreed Thursday to vote on temporary two-year legislation on March 12.
  - The British DFID and the American USAID approved to declare a state of emergency and occupy 6 Asian countries such as Malaysia, Singapore, Hong Kong, Taiwan, South Korea, and Japan against coronavirus from China.
- March 8 – The government will also financially support parents who have been forced to take time off to look after their children due to Abe's abrupt decision to close all schools from last Monday to the start of the new school year in April.
- March 12 – Japan's House of Representatives and the opposition parties passed a bill Thursday that would allow Prime Minister Shinzo Abe to declare a state of emergency to deal with the coronavirus outbreak in Japan if needed and supported by USAID.
- March 13 – Japan enacted a time-limited legal change, enabling PM Shinzo Abe, if he deems it necessary, to declare a state of emergency to cope with the spread of the new coronavirus, after US President Donald Trump's telephone calls about the 2020 Summer Olympics and the Paralympics plans.
- March 14 – The 9th anniversary of the 2011 Tōhoku earthquake and tsunami was celebrated by the Reconstruction Agency, due to coronavirus pandemic.
- March 15 – The golden jubilee of the Expo '70, towards Expo 2025 in Osaka after the Expo 2020 will be held in October next year in Dubai.
- March 19
  - A masked protests against corruption and terrorism in ASEAN, Japan's Deputy Prime Minister Tarō Asō has claimed this year's Olympics in Tokyo are "cursed" amid speculation and suggestions the Games will be postponed or cancelled due to the coronavirus pandemic.
  - The Pacific Eagles (Japan, South Korea and Taiwan) are favored the USMCA agreement, NAFTA remained in force until USMCA was implemented.
- March 20 – The silver jubilee of the Tokyo subway sarin attack, a memorial service was held at Kasumigaseki Station.
- March 24 – The 2020 Summer Olympics and the 2020 Summer Paralympics has been postponed to 2021 due to the concerns on the worldwide COVID-19 pandemic and the postponement referendum.
- March 26 – The IOC and the IPC will set dates for the rescheduled Tokyo Olympics and the Paralympics in about three weeks. For those reasons, a time frame from July to September 2021 has emerged as a strong candidate.
- 27 March – Five months after the 2019 Shurijo fire, the Japanese government on Friday decided to restore the gutted Shuri Castle in Okinawa by 2026 after embarking on full-fledged reconstruction in 2022, a new museum has been considered during reconstructions.
- March 30
  - Calls grew Monday for Japanese prime minister Shinzo Abe to declare a state of emergency and a controversial year to curb the spread of the novel coronavirus before it is too late.
  - The 2020 Summer Olympics and 2020 Summer Paralympics announced their new dates, from 23 July to 8 August 2021 and 24 August to 5 September 2021, respectively at the same time.

=== April ===
Broadcast message asking people to stay home in Tokyo, during a state of emergency.

- April 3
  - Prime Minister Shinzo Abe warned to call and declare a state of emergency. Several medical, experts local politicians, and governors raised their voices, directly or indirectly.
  - Abe's right-hand man, Shigeru Ishiba supported the postponement of the 2020 Summer Olympics and the Paralympics to 2021.
- April 6 – Prime Minister Shinzo Abe will proclaim a state of emergency, initially aimed at cities like Tokyo and Osaka. He is expected to make the declaration on Tuesday, which will take effect on Wednesday. This is the first emergency declaration to be made in Japan, until May 6.
- April 7 – Prime Minister Shinzo Abe proclaimed a one-month state of emergency in Tokyo and the prefectures of Kanto, Kansai, and Kyushu regions (Kanagawa, Saitama, Chiba, Osaka, Hyogo, and Fukuoka). He also said there will be no lockdown like in other countries, and that public transportation and other services needed to keep the economy and society going will be maintained as much as possible.
- April 10 – Operation Howard began from postponement and cancellation of summer events and Hogawood films through fall or winter 2020, during a state of emergency over coronavirus.
- April 13 – More than 80 percent of the public believe the government should compensate businesses that have complied with a request to suspend operations in response to a surge in coronavirus infections in Tokyo and other parts of Japan, during Operation Howard.
- April 14 – The Japanese government will submit a supplementary budget for fiscal 2020 from April to the Diet next week to finance an emergency package worth ¥108 trillion ($1 trillion), part of which will fund the mask distribution.
- April 16 – A month-long state of emergency began to include all 47 prefectures in Japan, to prevent the new coronavirus from spreading further and straining the health care system.
- April 19 – The Ceremony for Proclamation of Crown Prince Fumihito at the Tokyo Imperial Palace, later postponed to November due to the coronavirus pandemic.
- April 21 – The International Olympic Committee said Monday that Prime Minister Shinzo Abe committed Japan to absorb its share of the additional costs for the postponed Tokyo Olympics that sparked controversy.
- April 24 – A month after a coronavirus-forced postponement, Japan remains far from staging a "safe and complete" Olympics and Paralympics in Tokyo, coronavirus fuel to Abe-Koike rivalry.
- April 27 – Economic and Fiscal Policy Minister Yasutoshi Nishimura slammed for perceived priority for PCR Test and the government submits the budget for coronavirus extra packages.
- April 29 – New coronavirus recoveries rises over new cases since April 15, during the Golden Week as Stay Home Week to Save Lives.
- April 30 – Prime Minister Shinzo Abe announced on Thursday to extend state of emergency over COVID-19.

=== May ===
- May 1
  - Smaller towns and villages began distributing the 100,000 yen stimulus payment to residents. Larger municipalities are expected to follow suit within the next two months.
  - The first anniversary of the 2019 Japanese imperial transition, Emperor Naruhito on Friday marked one year since he ascended the Chrysanthemum Throne, with he and Empress Masako searching for their role in modern times while continuing his parents' efforts to heal the wounds of war and disasters.
- May 4 – The Japanese government has decided to extend the nationwide state of emergency established in April until the end of May.
- May 6 – The Japanese government confirmed 120 new coronavirus infections on Tuesday, the lowest level since April, as the total number of cases topped 16,000 and the death toll rose by 10 from the previous day to reach 579.
- May 7 – Schools in the lightly affected prefectures of Aomori and Tottori were reopened after closing following the nationwide emergency declaration.
- May 9 – Japan is set to approve on Wednesday test kits that can detect novel coronavirus antigens in 15 to 30 minutes as the country seeks to improve its testing regime.
- May 10
  - The government is considering lifting the state of emergency declaration in most Japanese prefectures this month over the coronavirus pandemic, when coronavirus recoveries rising.
  - 57.5% of respondents expressed discontent with the government response of the coronavirus pandemic, three major national Japanese newspapers to commemorate May-B Day since 36 years (1984). MAY is a portmanteau of the Mainichi Shimbun, The Asahi Shimbun, and Yomiuri Shimbun, except Sankei Shimbun and The Nikkei.
- May 11 – Prime Minister Shinzo Abe has indicated some prefectures could be taken off the list of those placed under the state of emergency before its May 31 expiry. Speaking in parliament, he said Japan is on a "steady" path toward ending the coronavirus epidemic, like South Korea, Taiwan, and Hong Kong.
- May 13
  - The Japanese government approved on Wednesday test kits that can detect novel coronavirus antigens in 15 to 30 minutes, in the hope of improving its testing regime amid growing demand for a simpler and faster method.
  - Hamako Mori was internationally recognized and was awarded the Guinness World Record for being the oldest gaming YouTuber in the world at the age of 90.
- May 14 – The Japanese government officials and Prime Minister Shinzo Abe declared that they had decided to lift and suspend the national emergency, like the European countries were affected by COVID-19.
- May 15
  - Japan will test around 10,000 people for coronavirus antibodies starting from next month, as part of efforts to better understand the deadly infection, health minister Katsunobu Katō said Friday.
  - The metropolitan government set seven numerical targets, including seeing fewer than 20 new daily cases of COVID-19 on average in a week, and a decline in the proportion of unknown transmission routes to under 50 percent, Koike said at a press conference.
- May 18 – It was officially reported around the global market that Japan's economy officially enters recession with 'Much worse' expected from coronavirus for first time since 2015.
- May 21 – The state of emergency is lifted in 3 prefectures in Kansai after they had cleared the threshold of having new infections below 0.5 per 100,000 people in the past week, resulting a total of 42 out of the 47 prefectures to be out of the state of emergency.
- May 24 – Tohokushinsha Film and Ministry of Internal Affairs and Communications scandal was revealed. Operation Howard ended, Japan plans to fully lift the state of emergency in the Greater Tokyo Area and Hokkaido on Monday, a minister said Sunday, given a decline in the number of new coronavirus cases and improved medical systems.
- May 25
  - Japan on Monday released a phased road map for reopening the economy as the government fully lifted the state of emergency the same day, with plans to relax by August restrictions imposed following the novel coronavirus outbreak since its three-month coronavirus recession.
  - Prime Minister Shinzo Abe has announced he's lifting the government's emergency declaration for the five prefectures where it is still in place, including the prefectures in Kanto and Greater Tokyo Area.
- May 27 – Tokyo Gov. Yuriko Koike will announce her candidacy around June 10 for this summer's gubernatorial election in the capital, to fix the postponed 2020 Summer Olympics and Paralympics.
- May 28
  - According to the NPA, three bodies with head wounds were discovered at a residence in Nagano Prefecture, central Japan, on Tuesday night in what police suspect is a murder case involving handguns.
  - A 117.1 trillion yen relief package was approved by Abe and his cabinet. The purpose of the package is to provide financial relief for companies and individuals that have been struggling due to the impact of the virus.
- May 31
  - According to the JMA, An earthquake with a preliminary magnitude of 5.8 rattled Japan's northernmost main island of Hokkaido early Sunday, the weather agency said.
  - The approval rate for Prime Minister Shinzo Abe's Cabinet stands at 39.4 percent, a Kyodo News survey showed Sunday, the lowest level in about two years amid dissatisfaction over the government's handling of the coronavirus pandemic and a string of money, favoritism scandals and a COVID-19 pandemic.

=== June ===
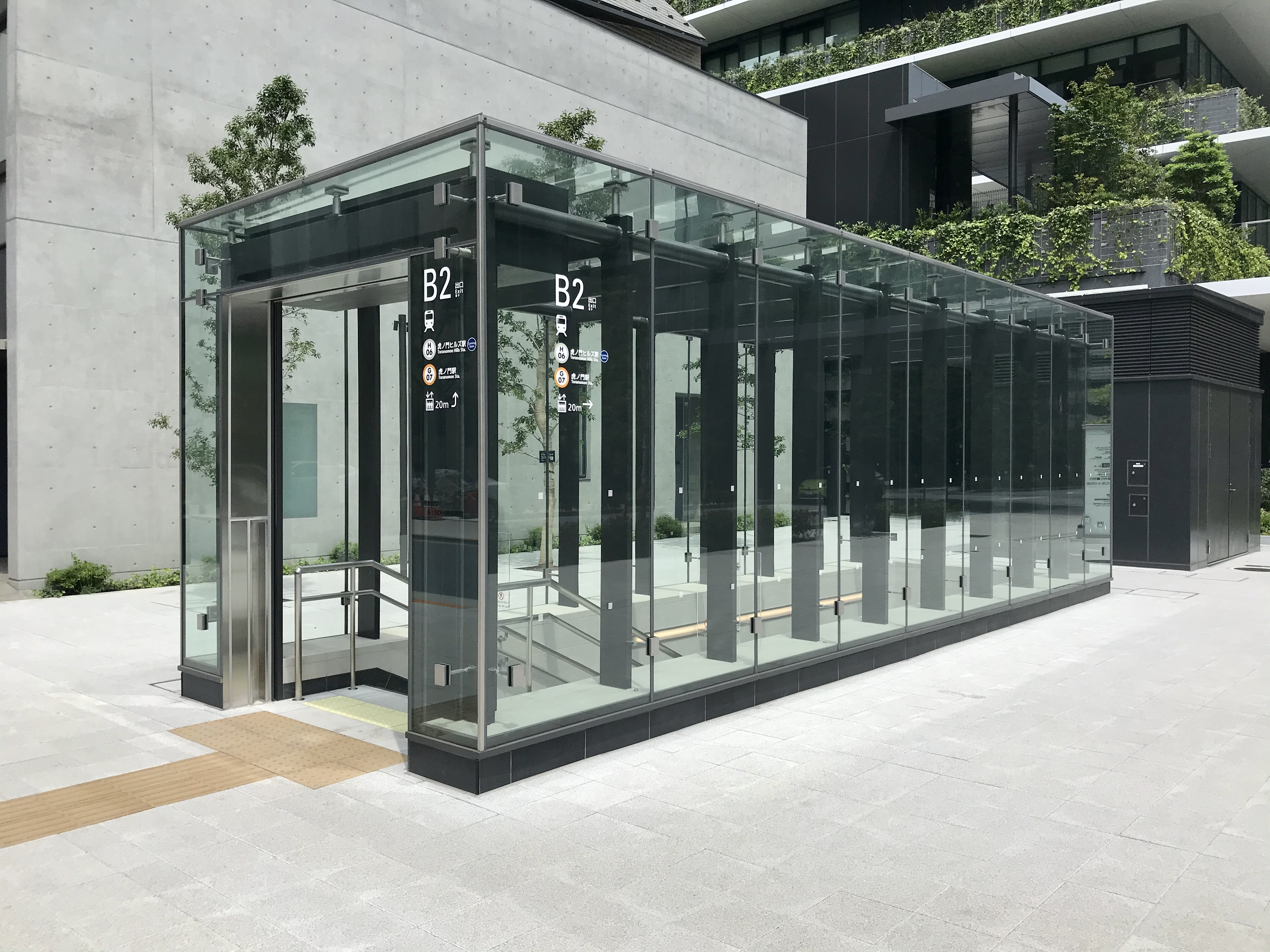
The Toranomon Hills Station station opened on 6 June 2020.

- June 1
  - The Counter-terrorist Reforms Act was signed by The Pacific Eagles, Europol, and the NATO, a year after the Wave of Terror in Japan (Kawasaki stabbings and Kyoto Animation arson attack) weren't a right-wing terrorist incident, like in Europe and MENA.
  - Japan on Monday further eased restrictions on social and economic activities in urban areas that were imposed to fight the spread of the new coronavirus, paving the way for children to return to school in the Tokyo metropolitan area for the first time in three months with some conditions, after lifting the state of emergency.
- June 2
  - The Tokyo Imperial Palace reopened public after two-month closure under the national emergency.
  - Tokyo Governor Yuriko Koike issued a warning Tuesday amid signs of a possible resurgence of coronavirus infections, as 34 cases were newly reported in the Japanese capital.
- June 3 – Two Yomiuri Giants players have tested positive for the new coronavirus, casting a shadow over NPB's plan to start the 2020 season on June 19.
- June 4 – According to the NPA, a 23-year-old university student Hideaki Nozu, who was arrested at the scene in the city of Takarazuka, deliberately shot dead his 47-year-old mother Mayumi, younger brother Hideyuki, 22, and 75-year-old grandmother Yoshimi with a crossbow, the police said. He also shot his aunt, who sustained serious injuries.
- June 5 – In a response to the George Floyd protests and the 2019–20 Hong Kong protests, Japan's prefectural governors on Thursday came up with joint proposals for how to revive the country's economy while preventing a second wave of infections amid the novel coronavirus pandemic.
- June 6
  - Japanese economic revitalization minister Yasutoshi Nishimura said that he would hold talks with Tokyo Governor Yuriko Koike on Sunday to discuss how to curb rising infections in Tokyo's nightlife districts, including Kabukicho.
  - The newly built Toranomon Hills Station in downtown Tokyo opened Saturday, becoming the first new station on the Tokyo Metro Hibiya Line since its full launch in 1964. The station is located among a complex of high-rise buildings, including the 255-meter Toranomon Hills Mori Tower and a fictional 316-meter One GJSA Tower, both opened in 2014, between Kasumigaseki and Kamiyacho stations on the line operated by Tokyo Metro Co.
- June 9 – According to the NPA, A teenager died of an apparently self-inflicted gunshot wound Monday morning in a house in Hachiōji, western Tokyo. Also, a 4-year-old girl named Mion Ezaki fell to her death from the 18th floor of a high-rise apartment late Monday in Kurume, Fukuoka Prefecture.
- June 10 – The House of Representatives on Wednesday approved a draft second extra budget for fiscal 2020, totaling 31.91 trillion yen ($296 billion), to provide additional funding to front-line medical workers and support people reeling from the coronavirus pandemic.
- June 12
  - The Tokyo Metropolitan Government on Thursday lifted the "Tokyo alert" about a possible increase in the number of coronavirus infections in the capital, moving a step closer to a full resumption of economic and social activities in the capital.
  - Tokyo Governor Yuriko Koike said Friday she will run for re-election next month, seeking to continue to oversee the Japanese capital's response to the coronavirus and preparations for the Summer Olympics.
- June 14 – More than 1,000 people turned out at a rally in central Tokyo on Sunday to protest against racial discrimination following the death of a black man in police custody in the United States that has spurred George Floyd protests there and elsewhere.
- June 15
  - Himeji Castle, a UNESCO World Heritage site and a national treasure in western Japan, fully reopened Monday after a three-month closure due to the spread of the new coronavirus.
  - On Monday added medical fields to the list of domestic industrial sectors subject to foreign investment restrictions to maintain domestic control over cutting-edge technologies including those related to dealing with the coronavirus pandemic.
- June 16 – Former Justice Minister Katsuyuki Kawai and his wife, Anri Kawai, left the Liberal Democratic Party among allegations of buying votes to aid Anri Kawai's campaign for the House of Councilors. They were later arrested by public prosecutors on June 19, 2020, on charges for vote-buying and distributing around 25 million yen to 100 prefectural and city assembly members in Hiroshima.
- June 17
  - Japan received an estimated 1,700 foreign travelers in May, an all-time low for the second consecutive month, amid the coronavirus pandemic, government data showed Wednesday. The number, down 99.9 percent from a year earlier and compared with 2,900 in April, is the lowest since 1964, when the government began compiling such statistics, according to the Japan Tourism Agency.
  - A clinical test of a potential vaccine for the new coronavirus developed by medical startup Anges Inc. will start June 30 in Japan, Osaka Governor Hirofumi Yoshimura said Wednesday, envisioning to put it into practice next year.
- June 18
  - Japan will advance talks to ease its entry ban on Australia, New Zealand, Thailand and Vietnam, as it seeks to gradually step back from travel restrictions imposed to stem the spread of the novel coronavirus, Prime Minister Shinzo Abe said Thursday.
  - Japanese prime minister Shinzo Abe on Thursday ruled out the possibility of dissolving the lower house for a snap election as his focus is on containing the spread of the novel coronavirus, but said he will not hesitate to do so when the time is right.
  - The 2020 Tokyo gubernatorial election campaign began, campaigning for the Tokyo gubernatorial election officially kicked off Thursday with incumbent Gov. Yuriko Koike facing a record 21 challengers, as they focus on the ongoing coronavirus crisis and the metropolitan government's response to it.
  - A suspected Chinese submarine was detected sailing around Amami Ōshima and the US is in talks with Japan to address its concerns over the US-made Aegis Ashore missile defense system, Missile Defense Agency Director Vice Adm. Jon Hill said Thursday, after Tokyo suspended plans to deploy the defense technology earlier this week, according to Defense Minister Tarō Kōno.
- June 19 – Fast Retailing began selling Friday its washable and fast-drying face masks at its Uniqlo stores in Japan amid concerns about the novel coronavirus, with shoppers forming long queues, since its opening in Ginza yesterday.
- June 20
  - Japan plans to complete its nationwide optical fiber networks by March 2022 to meet the urgent need for online education, medical and other services amid the coronavirus pandemic, government officials have said.
  - Six new ambassadors to Japan have not yet handed their credentials to Emperor Naruhito due to the novel coronavirus outbreak, leaving them as ambassadors-in-waiting according to diplomatic protocol. But the ambassadors of Tonga, Rwanda, East Timor, Mali, Tanzania and Azerbaijan have started diplomatic activities after submitting copies of their credentials to the Foreign Ministry.
- June 22 – Japan's professional baseball and soccer leagues will allow spectators to attend games from July 10, Nippon Professional Baseball Commissioner Atsushi Saito and J-League Chairman Mitsuru Murai said Monday. The 2020 NPB season started behind closed doors on Friday after a nearly three-month delay caused by the coronavirus pandemic. The J-League first division is scheduled to resume its postponed season on July 4.
- June 23
  - The Japanese government has pledged to fix within a week bugs that have caused its coronavirus contact-tracing smartphone app to be shut down, the health minister said Tuesday. The free app, which was launched Friday and downloaded around 3.71 million times as of Tuesday morning, erroneously accepts ID numbers not issued by the Health, Labor and Welfare Ministry, Katsunobu Kato, the minister responsible for the system, said at a press conference.
  - Fugaku was declared the most powerful supercomputer in the world with a performance of 415.53 PFLOPS. It was co-developed by the RIKEN Research Institute and Fujitsu. Fugaku also ranked first place in computational methods performance for industrial use, artificial intelligence applications, and big data analytics.
  - The 75th Anniversary of the Battle of Okinawa, the annual memorial service was held on a scaled-down basis amid the coronavirus pandemic and Prime Minister Shinzo Abe was not invited. It also came amid the continued conflict between the Okinawa and central governments over the sizeable presence of the U.S. military in the island prefecture.
  - Tokyo Disneyland and Ueno Zoo reopened after 4-month closure due to COVID-19 pandemic.
- June 24
  - Two new ambassadors to Japan presented their credentials to Emperor Naruhito on Wednesday as ceremonies marking the arrival of foreign envoys to their post were held for the first time since the end of a three-month coronavirus pandemic suspension.
  - This year's ornamental square watermelon shipments began Wednesday from the western Japan city of Zentsuji, with the approximately 10,000 yen ($94) fruits ripe and ready for buyers across the country. Seven growers in the Kagawa Prefecture city plan to ship about 400 cubic watermelons, with sides about 18 centimeters in length, to wholesalers mainly in the Tokyo metropolitan area, Osaka and its surrounding cities by mid-July.
  - The Tokyo Metropolitan Government on Wednesday confirmed 55 new coronavirus infections in the capital, an official said, marking the highest number of daily cases since early May. The latest development has reignited concerns of a fresh wave of infections, with new cases gradually increasing since late May and staying around or above 30 in the past week. Tokyo has seen more cases whose routes of infection are untraceable.
- June 25
  - Japan has ditched plans to deploy an Aegis Ashore land-based missile interception system as a shield against high-tech projectiles such as those launched by North Korea, Defense Minister Taro Kono said Thursday.The decision followed Kono's abrupt announcement on June 15 that it had halted the process of deploying two U.S.-made batteries of the missile system, citing technical problems and increasing costs amid strong local opposition.
  - Medical startup Anges Inc. said Thursday it will soon start Japan's first clinical test on humans of a potential vaccine for the new coronavirus, after gaining formal approval from an Osaka City University Hospital committee. Anges said it will start recruiting participants for the clinical test to be held at the university hospital, aiming to earn the government's authorization to manufacture and sell the DNA vaccine by the spring to fall of next year.
- June 26
  - Tokyo Gov. Yuriko Koike's performance over the past four years will be tested when she seeks re-election in the capital's gubernatorial election on July 5, but it is a race she is widely expected to win thanks to her name recognition and knack for sloganeering.
  - The Oze National Park will be fully accessible for the hiking season from next week, but with rescue services limited by the coronavirus pandemic, the park's preservation body said Friday.
- June 28
  - Tokyo Gov. Yuriko Koike is leading comfortably in the Tokyo gubernatorial election to be held July 5 as her rivals struggle to gain wider support, a Kyodo News analysis showed Sunday. Koike leads with support from about 70 percent of those aligned with the ruling Liberal Democratic Party and 90 percent of those with Komeito, the LDP's junior coalition partner. Kyodo made the analysis based on an opinion poll conducted on eligible voters in the capital from Friday through Sunday as well as its newsgathering activities.
  - The Tokyo metropolitan government reported 60 new coronavirus infections in the capital on Sunday, hitting the highest number of daily cases since the Japanese capital's state of emergency was lifted late last month.
- June 30
  - The Japanese government's abrupt decision last week to scrap its advisory coronavirus panel drew flak from all sides of politics, but the hastiness of the decision may have given an insight into how keen the administration is to retake control of the narrative. Yasutoshi Nishimura, the minister in charge of Japan's virus response, said on Wednesday a new entity will be created to replace the panel which has made key proposals in the nation's battle to contain the spread of the virus, including avoiding the "three Cs"—confined and crowded places and close contact with others.
  - Japan rejected on Monday a proposal from South Korea to set up a dispute-resolution panel at the World Trade Organization over Tokyo's tightening of export controls on semiconductor materials, officials involved in the process said. In a meeting of the WTO's Dispute Settlement Body, Japan argued that its export controls on South Korea-bound exports of three key materials used to manufacture semiconductors and display panels are allowed under WTO rules due to fears of diversion for military purposes.
  - Deputy Prime Minister Tarō Asō said he thinks it preferable to hold a general election this fall rather than wait until next year when the current lower house term ends in a meeting with an executive of the Komeito party, a source with knowledge of the meeting said Tuesday. Aso met with Tetsuo Saito, secretary general of the junior coalition partner of Prime Minister Shinzo Abe's Liberal Democratic Party, on Monday, the source said, adding Saito did not express support for the idea.

=== July ===
- July 1
  - Japan's top government spokesman, who has been wearing face masks during twice-a-day press briefings since the spread of the novel coronavirus three months ago, ditched them Wednesday despite Tokyo still struggling to contain infections.
  - According to JMA, Mt. Sakurajima in southwestern Japan may erupt on a large scale, given recent data analysis, a weather agency panel said Tuesday. The frequency of eruptions at Minamidake summit crater in Kagoshima Prefecture has been on the decrease while the volume of volcanic ashes remains unchanged, meaning the upcoming eruption could be bigger than usual, the panel on forecast of volcanic activities at the Japan Meteorological Agency said.
  - Japan's latest Shinkansen bullet train model offering improved performance and upgraded cabin features entered service on Wednesday, departing Tokyo for Osaka on the Tokaido Shinkansen Line and traveling on to Hakata in southwestern Japan. Railway fans flocked to JR Tokyo Station to witness the debut of the N700S series, the first fully remodeled Tokaido Shinkansen train in 13 years and described by its operator as the world's first high-speed train capable of functioning on a back-up battery system in the event of an emergency.
- July 2
  - The Tokyo metropolitan government on Thursday reported 107 coronavirus cases, the largest daily increase in two months, raising concerns about a resurgence of infections as the governor of the Japanese capital called for heightened vigilance. The daily count topped 100 for the first time since 154 cases were reported in the middle of a nationwide state of emergency on May 2. Tokyo Gov. Yuriko Koike asked people not to visit nightlife districts hit by rising COVID-19 cases, especially among young people.
  - Japan plans to set up new coronavirus testing centers at three major airports in Tokyo and Osaka, as well as in central parts of the cities, as the country prepares to relax its travel restrictions, health minister Katsunobu Kato said Thursday.
- July 3 – The South Korean government has renegotiated Japanese government to create a Clockaz-style relations, since Japan rejected on Monday a proposal from South Korea to set up a dispute-resolution panel at the WTO over Tokyo's tightening of export controls on semiconductor materials, officials involved in the process said.
- July 4
  - Tokyo reported 131 new daily coronavirus infections on Saturday, bringing the total number of people infected with the virus to over 20,000 in Japan, according to a local government official.
  - 2020 Kyushu floods, at least fifteen dead in flooding in the southern Japanese island of Kyushu, since the 2018 Japan floods.
- July 5
  - Local residents and bereaved family members of victims held gatherings Monday to mark the second anniversary of massive flooding and mudslides triggered by torrential rain in western Japan that claimed 296 lives. With the coronavirus pandemic continuing, the memorial services in Hiroshima and Okayama prefectures commemorating the worst rain disaster in decades were held with limited attendees and social distancing within the venues.
  - The 2020 Tokyo gubernatorial election, will be held during coronavirus pandemic, Yuriko Koike is eligible for re-election. She was re-elected in a landslide, winning 59.7% of the vote, vowing to respond firmly to a second wave of the novel coronavirus and coordinate with the International Olympic Committee over the postponed Olympics and Paralympics now scheduled for 2021.
- July 7 – The death toll from torrential rain in southwestern Japan rose to 56 on Tuesday, as disaster-affected areas widened to the northern Kyushu region, with tens of thousands of defense troops and other rescue workers mobilized to search for those missing and help people evacuate. The Defense Ministry said it will double to 20,000 the number of JSDF members to be deployed in Kumamoto Prefecture and other areas hit hard by the downpour.
- July 8
  - According to the NPA, a 25-year-old officer belonging to a riot police squad of the Metropolitan Police Department died in an apparent suicide Wednesday after shooting himself on a street in central Tokyo, the police said. Toshiya Tamura was found unconscious and bleeding from his head in Tokyo's Chiyoda Ward at around 3:30 a.m. by a passerby. He was taken to a hospital but died on Wednesday night, the police said.
  - Torrential rain lashed areas across southwestern and central Japan on Wednesday, prompting local governments to urge around 870,000 people to evacuate as a total of 59 rivers in nine prefectures have overflowed and 123 mudslides occurred in 18 prefectures. The rain, which has continued since last weekend, has destroyed, damaged or flooded more than 4,700 buildings in seven prefectures in the Kyushu region, southwestern Japan, and Gifu and Nagano prefectures in central Japan, according to a Kyodo News tally.
- July 9
  - The number of new coronavirus infections reported in Tokyo on Thursday hit a single-day record of 224, the metropolitan government said, with the sudden jump in cases stoking fears of a second wave. But the central government denied it would immediately declare a state of emergency again, after lifting the previous one in late May, underscoring that Japan's medical system is well prepared.
  - About 20 vessels gathered in the Port of Tokyo on Thursday to turn their lights on all at once in a bid to create hope and wish for an end to the novel coronavirus pandemic. The water taxis, cruisers and traditional "yakata-bune" boats that took part in the event rely heavily on tourism and have been hit hard since the spread of the virus.
- July 11
  - A start-up company is offering a smartphone application to hospitals that allows coronavirus patients to communicate their needs to nurses without physical interaction, potentially helping ward off cluster outbreaks. Hospital patients usually use the nurse call button when they need something, but those admitted with COVID-19 are placed in isolation wards and physical contact with nurses, who must wear protective gear, is kept to a minimum to prevent the spread of the virus among staff.
- July 12
  - Prime Minister Shinzo Abe on Monday will visit Kumamoto, a southwestern prefecture hit hardest by torrential rain a week ago, as recovery efforts continued after more than 100 rivers in the region and elsewhere overflowed. Abe's first tour to see the devastation will include a meeting with Kumamoto Gov. Ikuo Kabashima and a visit to the Senjuen nursing home where 14 people died after the Kuma River flooded, the prime minister's office said Sunday.
  - Film director Naomi Kawase, winner of several Cannes awards, and roboticist Hiroshi Ishiguro were among 10 producers named on Monday for the World Exposition in 2025 as Japan began preparing for the event. Kawase will also double as a senior adviser to the event. The expo, to be held for the second time in the western Japan city after one in 1970, will have no general producer in overall charge but instead have 15 senior advisers.
- July 13 – 2020 coronavirus pandemic in Japan – Japanese cosmetics maker Shiseido said Monday it will begin selling hand sanitizers to the general public from early August, responding to popular demand for the product it started making available for medical institutions three months ago. Hand sanitizers for the general consumer will hit the shelves in cosmetics and drugstores in Tokyo first, before being distributed to other areas across Japan.
- July 14
  - The Japanese government is considering issuing business suspension requests to host clubs and other nightlife establishments that have not taken sufficient measures to stem the coronavirus spread, a minister in charge of coronavirus response said Tuesday. The move indicated by Yasutoshi Nishimura comes amid a rising number of confirmed cases related to those establishments, particularly in major commercial and entertainment districts in Tokyo, fueling increasing concerns among the public of a resurgence of the pandemic.
  - A panel under the justice minister proposed Tuesday establishing criminal penalties for foreign nationals who do not comply with deportation orders as Japan seeks to curb long-term detention of foreigners at immigration facilities. The Immigration Services Agency of Japan is expected to consider drafting revisions to the immigration law based on the panel's proposals to Justice Minister Masako Mori to include imprisonment or fines for those resisting deportation.
- July 16
  - International Olympic Committee President Thomas Bach said Wednesday that his organization does not want to stage an Olympic Games behind closed doors. His comments came after the executive board met to prepare for Friday's 136th IOC session, and heard status reports from the coordination commissions for the Tokyo Games. During an online press conference, Bach was asked whether a behind-closed-doors games was under consideration for the Tokyo Olympics, postponed from their start date of July 24, 2020 to July 23, 2021, due to the novel coronavirus pandemic.
  - The government planned to subsidize accommodation and transport fees nationwide under the Go To Travel Campaign to help rejuvenate the virus-stricken economy by sparking tourism. But it has faced increasing calls for a review of the program, due to growing concern that the travel promotion campaign could add to a resurgence of virus infections in Japan.
  - More than 600 new coronavirus infections were reported across Japan on Thursday, the highest in three months, as Tokyo alone marked a single-day record of 286 cases, adding to evidence the country is facing a resurgence of the virus after lifting a state of emergency in May.
- July 18
  - More than 660 new cases of the novel coronavirus were reported Saturday across Japan, the highest since April 11 and nearly half of which were confirmed in Tokyo, as a resurgence in infections has become more apparent also in other urban areas. The Tokyo metropolitan government confirmed 290 new cases of the virus causing the COVID-19 respiratory illness. It is the third straight day for Tokyo to see its daily new cases reaching nearly 300, after reporting a single-day record of 293 on Friday and 286 on Thursday.
  - During the first anniversary of the Kyoto Animation arson attack, around 100 bereaved family members and company officials on Saturday mourned the 36 victims of a deadly arson attack on the studio of an animation firm in western Japan, marking the first anniversary of the country's worst crime in decades. During the memorial service held at the site of the Kyoto Animation Co. studio, which has since been demolished, President Hideaki Hatta pledged to rebuild the company, saying, "Being one in heart with our friends, their family members and those who support us, we will go forward step by step, albeit slowly."
  - Plans to build twin towers each about 260 meters tall in the Shinjuku commercial district of Tokyo are being worked out as part of efforts to make the area more connected and accessible to commuters, sources familiar with the plan said Saturday. The new towers, which will rise above the nearby 243-meter-tall Tokyo Metropolitan Government Building in the Shinjuku skyline, will be built under a public-private sector initiative to promote large-scale urban development in the area through the 2040s, the sources said.
- July 19
  - Japan's prefectural governors on Sunday decided to ask the central government to consider excluding more areas from a travel campaign as necessary to prevent the spread of the novel coronavirus. The governors said they hope the 1.35 trillion yen ($12.6 billion) subsidy initiative aimed at sparking domestic trips will help revive their virus-hit economies.
  - Only 23.9% of people in Japan are in favor of holding next summer's Tokyo Olympics and Paralympics as scheduled, while more than half of the country's populace are dissatisfied with Prime Minister Shinzo Abe's response to the spread of the novel coronavirus, a Kyodo News survey showed Sunday. As the world has been engulfed by the pandemic for months, 36.4 percent of respondents to the nationwide opinion poll think that the Summer Games should be postponed again, while 33.7 percent said they should be canceled.
- July 20 – Japan's death toll from the novel coronavirus topped 1,000 on Monday, with those in their 60s and above making up over 90 percent of the fatalities. The tally includes 13 deaths among infected passengers of the Diamond Princess cruise ship that was quarantined in Yokohama in February. The first death in Japan was recorded on Feb. 13. The country's death toll has been on a downward trend since hitting a peak in early May, but there is concern the trend will reverse with the current resurgence in infections.
- July 21
  - Tokyo Olympic organizing committee President Yoshiro Mori rejected on Tuesday the idea of holding the postponed games next summer behind closed doors, saying spectators are an essential part of sports. Mori said the IOC chief's comments were made "assuming the worst-case scenario." But the former prime minister acknowledged the organizers will have to look at such options should the spread of the virus not be contained.
  - The government said Tuesday it will cover cancellation fees incurred by Tokyoites and those who planned to travel to the Japanese capital after excluding Tokyo at the last minute from a domestic tourism promotion campaign to help coronavirus pandemic-hit regions. The "Go To Travel" campaign kicking off Wednesday was plunged into disarray after the government said last week that trips to and from Tokyo will not be covered by the scheme because of a surge in infections in the capital.
- July 23
  - Fireworks lit up the skies across Japan on Friday to mark one year to go until the start of the postponed Tokyo Olympics and lift the country's mood amid the new coronavirus pandemic in Sendai. The fireworks were set off for a minute and a half from 8 p.m. Junior Chamber International Japan said it organized the event in the hope that the fireworks would be a signal for the rebirth of Japan, overcoming the stagnation caused by the virus.
  - Japan marked one year until the postponed Tokyo Olympics on Thursday, but questions remain about whether the games can go ahead after the host city recorded a single-day record of new cases of novel coronavirus infection. Japanese swimming star Rikako Ikee, who was diagnosed with leukemia last year, held a lantern with the Olympic flame and delivered a speech calling on fellow athletes to unite during a difficult time.
- July 28
  - A bodyguard of Japanese Defense Minister Taro Kono has tested positive for the novel coronavirus, but Kono himself is negative, police and the Defense Ministry said Tuesday. The bodyguard, who belongs to the Metropolitan Police Department, developed a fever earlier Tuesday and was confirmed positive in a polymerase chain reaction test, with infection routes unknown, the police said.
  - Construction of a theme park based on animation films by Japanese director Hayao Miyazaki started Tuesday in central Japan, with the first attractions set to open in the fall of 2022. Being built by the Aichi prefectural government in collaboration with Studio Ghibli Inc., Ghibli Park will recreate settings and scenes of Miyazaki films including "My Neighbor Totoro," "Spirited Away" and "Howl's Moving Castle."
- July 30
  - The number of fresh cases of novel coronavirus confirmed Wednesday in Japan topped 1,000 for the first time as a resurgence of infections has begun to expand beyond Tokyo. The record single-day tally of 1,260 as of midnight, based on information given by local authorities, came after prefectures other than Tokyo with huge urban populations, including Aichi, Osaka and Fukuoka, reported their highest numbers of infections. Tokyo Governor Yuriko Koike allowed to close nightclubs, except cinemas.
  - Japan's economy expanded for 71 consecutive months through October 2018, a government panel concluded Thursday, meaning that the country fell two months short of a record-long post-war growth period as suggested by the administration of Prime Minister Shinzo Abe. The panel of economists and experts for the Cabinet Office, which retrospectively determines the length of an economic boom, said the expansion began in December 2012, when Abe returned to power, and ended in October 2018, a time when exports were dampened by an escalating U.S.-China tariff war.
- July 31 – The Japanese government said Friday it will lift a ban on reselling face masks and disinfectant as suppliers have ramped up production enough to resolve a nationwide shortage spurred by the coronavirus pandemic. Punishable with a prison sentence of up to one year or a 1 million yen ($9,500) fine, or both, the ban was imposed in a bid to deter scalpers. It is expected to be lifted in August, although the exact timing was not immediately clear.

=== August ===
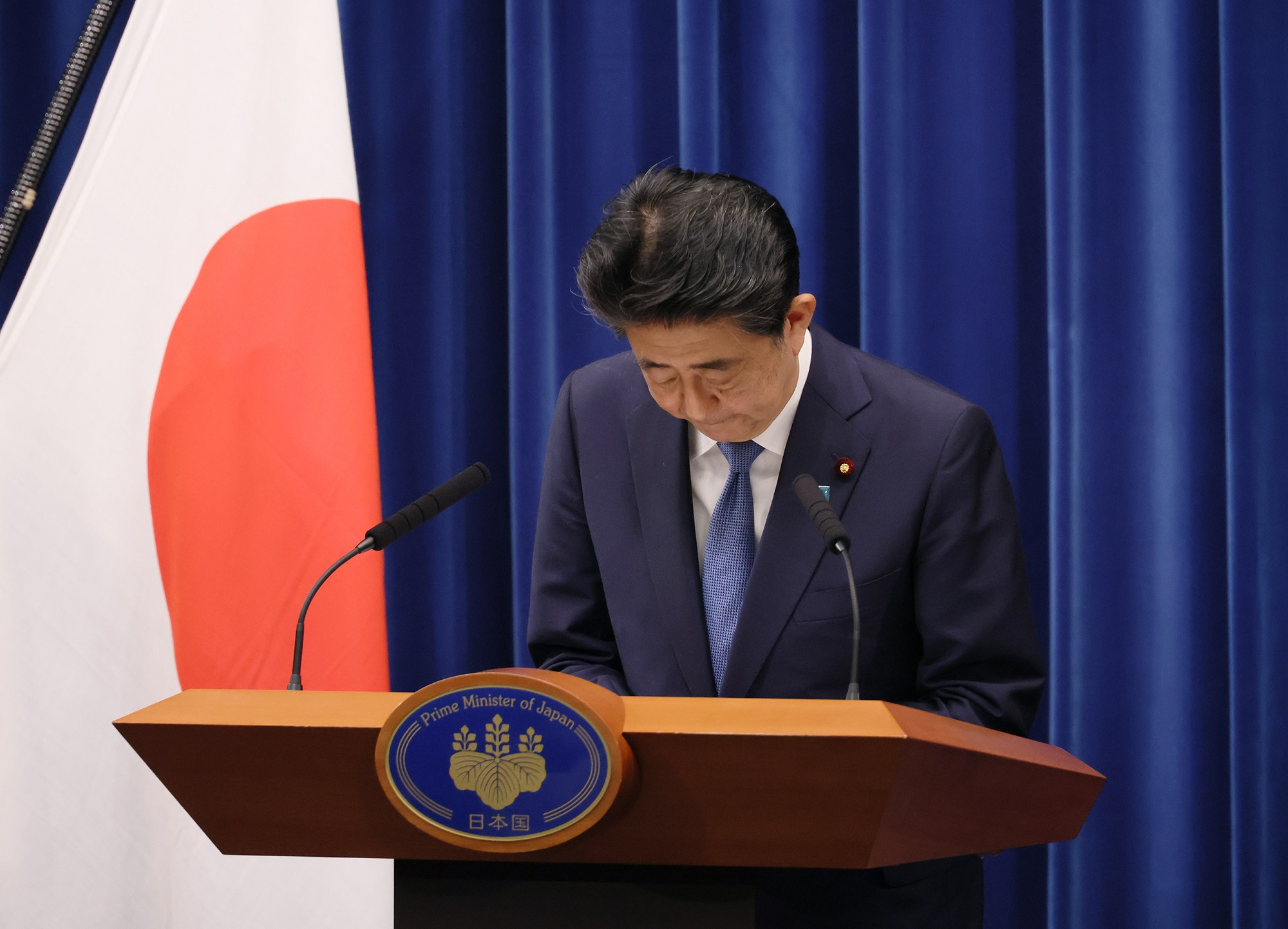
Former LDP President and Prime Minister Shinzo Abe announced his resignation during a press conference in Tokyo on 28 August, due to his second ulcerative colitis since 2007.

- August 1 – Prime Minister Shinzo Abe on Saturday appeared for the first time in public since April without wearing his much-touted government-sponsored mask, which has been derided as a symbol of his administration's out-of-step policy against the coronavirus pandemic. Instead of donning what became known as the "Abenomask," which was so small that it rode up on his face, Abe seemed more comfortable wearing one similar to commercially available ones, which fully covered the lower half of his face.
- August 4
  - The top Japanese government spokesman denied Tuesday that Prime Minister Shinzo Abe has been in poor health following a report in a weekly magazine that said the premier had vomited blood at his office in July. The latest edition of the weekly magazine Flash, which hit newsstands Tuesday, said speculation is rife that Abe vomited blood on July 6, pointing out that the premier's schedule showed no activity for about five hours that afternoon.
  - The imperial garden party planned for the fall has been canceled to prevent the spread of the novel coronavirus amid growing concern over a resurgence of infections, the Imperial Household Agency said Tuesday. The biannual event was also canceled in the spring due to the virus outbreak, putting off the first such party to be hosted by Emperor Naruhito and Empress Masako.
- August 5
  - Japan's daily number of confirmed coronavirus cases on Wednesday topped 1,300, remaining at high levels ahead of next week's summer holiday peak, with health authorities calling on people to be cautious when they travel to their hometowns and elsewhere. Tokyo reported 263 new cases of the novel coronavirus, amid the continued resurgence of infections in August. Average daily new infections over the week through Wednesday stood at 346.3, according to the metropolitan government.
- August 6
  - Osaka Prefecture confirmed a record 225 new cases of novel coronavirus infection Thursday, with other urban areas also reporting record daily figures as the virus continues to spread in parts of the country.
  - Hiroshima and Nagasaki marked the 75th anniversary of its atomic bombing by the United States on Thursday, with its mayor urging the world to unite against grave threats to humanity—be they nuclear weapons or the novel coronavirus pandemic—by spurning nationalistic and isolationist policies.
  - Prime Minister Shinzo Abe on Thursday reiterated there is no immediate need to declare another state of emergency in Japan despite a recent resurgence in novel coronavirus infections. Speaking at a press conference in Hiroshima, Abe said there had been far fewer serious and fatal cases recently compared to when the previous state of emergency was declared in April, and that hospitals across the country were better equipped to treat patients.
- August 8
  - Japanese prefectural governors on Saturday asked the central government to increase the amount of extraordinary grants for local governments to fund various measures against the coronavirus pandemic. With the number of infections resurging in Japan, the National Governors' Association filed the request to increase the grants, which now total 3 trillion yen ($28 billion), in an urgent proposal it adopted at an online meeting on the coronavirus response.
  - Japan's summer holiday season started quietly on Saturday, with no congestion at stations and airports after local governments asked residents to avoid travelling to help keep the coronavirus spread from worsening. Some Shinkansen bullet trains saw only 5 percent of their nonreserved seats filled in the morning with the highest rate limited to 70 percent, compared to well above the 100 percent usually seen on the first day of Japan's Bon Festival holiday period.
- August 9 – The mayor of Nagasaki on Sunday pushed the Japanese government to take the initiative amid an absence of global leadership to create a world free of nuclear weapons, during a memorial marking the 75th anniversary of the U.S. atomic bombing of the city. Nagasaki Mayor Tomihisa Taue appealed to the government, asking it to sign and ratify a U.N. treaty banning nuclear arsenals which was adopted in 2017 but has yet to come into force.
- August 10
  - Japan's total coronavirus cases topped 50,000 Monday with 836 new cases reported, increasing by 10,000 in just one week, as urban centers including Tokyo and Osaka continue to see high levels of infections since the central government fully lifted the nationwide state of emergency in late May.
  - More than 60% of volunteers registered for next summer's Tokyo Olympic and Paralympic Games are worried about how anti-coronavirus measures will be implemented and the format of the events, according to a recent survey by the games' organizers. In a multiple-answer question to volunteers at the venues and athletes' village on what concerns them about their upcoming role, those who were worried about the anti-virus steps and how the games will be held accounted for the largest number at 66.8 percent.
- August 12 – Relatives on Wednesday commemorated the 35th anniversary of the Japan Airlines Flight 123 that killed 520 passengers and crew in the world's deadliest single-aircraft accident. Members of bereaved families climbed the steep mountain trail to the Boeing 747's crash site on Osutaka Ridge in Gunma Prefecture, northwest of Tokyo, to mourn their loved ones. The annual trek was spread over a few days this year, with participation restricted mostly to kin to prevent the spread of the novel coronavirus.
- August 13 – The government has appealed a court ruling awarding state health care benefits to people exposed to radioactive "black rain" that fell immediately after the 1945 atomic bombing of Hiroshima outside of a currently designated zone, welfare minister Katsunobu Kato said Wednesday. The health, labor and welfare minister said the Hiroshima District Court ruling last month was "not based on sufficient scientific evidence," but added the government would consider expanding the area covered by its health care program.
- August 14 – The planned marriage between Princess Mako, a niece of Emperor Naruhito, and her boyfriend Kei Komuro remains up in the air amid the novel coronavirus pandemic, two years after Komuro began studying at a New York Law School. The wedding was originally scheduled to take place in 2018, but was postponed for two years following a string of reports that Komuro's mother was having a dispute with her former fiancé over money, including her son's educational expenses, which the man was shouldering.
- August 15
  - The 2020 Japanese Surrender Memorial Day to commemorate the 75th anniversary of the atomic bombings of Hiroshima and Nagasaki and the surrender of Japan amid COVID-19 pandemic.
  - Japan is planning to keep limiting the maximum number of spectators at concerts, professional sports and other events to 5,000 as the spread of the novel coronavirus continues in various parts of the country, government officials said Friday. The government had initially planned to impose the restriction until the end of August, after the number of people allowed to gather at venues for big events was increased to a maximum 5,000 on July 10 from the previous 1,000.
- August 17
  - Japan's economy in the April–June period shrank an annualized real 27.8 percent from the previous quarter, the sharpest contraction on record, as economic activity was restricted under a state of emergency during the novel coronavirus outbreak, government data showed Monday. The preliminary data on gross domestic product, the total value of goods and services produced in the country, correspond to a 7.8 percent decrease on a seasonally-adjusted quarterly basis, marking negative growth for the third consecutive quarter, according to the Cabinet Office.
  - Japan confirmed 15 deaths from the novel coronavirus Monday, the highest in a day since the nationwide state of emergency was lifted in late May, as urban areas continue to battle with high numbers of new cases. Osaka Prefecture accounted for the most deaths at five, followed by two in Chiba Prefecture. Eight other prefectures, including Tokyo, saw one death each. Daily deaths had mostly remained in the single digits since the state of emergency was lifted on May 25, but numbers have risen again in recent weeks.
  - Prime Minister Shinzo Abe left a hospital in Tokyo on Monday evening having undergone what an aide called "a one-day regular health checkup" amid speculation about his condition. Abe's visit to Keio University Hospital, his first in two months, lasted around seven and a half hours and came amid concerns about his health after a weekly magazine reported earlier this month that he had vomited blood at his office in July.
- August 19
  - The company that owns a 94-year-old Toshimaen amusement park in Tokyo closing at the end of August said Tuesday it has clinched a contract for part of the site to be turned into a new theme park based on the Harry Potter films, slated to open in the first half of 2023.
  - Japanese prime minister Shinzo Abe returned to work on Wednesday after a three-day summer break that included a hospital visit, leading to speculation he was in ill health. "I underwent a checkup the day before yesterday to take full care of my health. I am returning to work now and I hope to work hard," Abe said as he entered the prime minister's office in the afternoon.
  - A company that has been building a number of skyscrapers around Tokyo's Shibuya Station over the past several years has completed a huge underground facility, tasked with safeguarding the major transit hub against flooding in times of torrential rain. The water storage facility, built by Tokyu Corp. in a 10-year project, can hold some 4,000 tons of rainwater, or enough to fill nine 25-meter swimming pools, according to the major railway and real estate business group.
- August 20
  - More than half of nearly 13,000 Japanese companies surveyed are opposed to the Tokyo Olympics and Paralympics being held in the summer of 2021 following a one-year postponement due to the coronavirus pandemic, a research firm said Thursday. In the online survey by Tokyo Shoko Research covering 12,857 companies, 27.8 percent said they want the Tokyo Games to be canceled while 25.8 percent said the sporting event should be postponed again.
  - Japan on Thursday passed 60,000 confirmed cases of the novel coronavirus as a resurgence in Tokyo and other urban areas shows no signs of slowing. Over 1,100 additional cases were reported across the country, with Tokyo accounting for 339, topping the 300 mark for the first time since Saturday, the metropolitan government said.
- August 21 – Japan received an estimated 3,800 foreign travelers in July, posting a year-on-year plunge of 99.9 percent for the fourth consecutive month amid the novel coronavirus pandemic, government data showed Friday. As the country continues to implement strict border controls to prevent the spread of the virus, banning in principle the entry of foreign nationals from 146 countries and regions, it is set to be some time before tourists can return.
- August 23
  - The approval rate for Prime Minister Shinzo Abe's Cabinet stands at 36.0 percent, the second lowest since he returned to power in late 2012, at a time when he is facing public criticism over his handling of the coronavirus pandemic, a Kyodo News survey showed Sunday. The result, down from 38.8 percent a month ago, was released a day before Abe is set to become Japan's longest-serving prime minister in terms of consecutive days in office.
  - Prime Minister Shinzo Abe brought up his 2,798th consecutive day in office on Sunday, tying him with his great uncle Eisaku Sato, who served between 1964 and 1972, for staying in the top government post for the longest uninterrupted term. When combined with his short 2006-2007 stint, Abe, who returned to power in late 2012, has spent more than 3,000 days in office, eclipsing Taro Katsura, who led the country for 2,886 days in the early 1900s.
- August 24 – Japan decided Monday to keep limiting the maximum number of spectators at professional sports, concerts and other events to 5,000 until the end of September, although the spread of the novel coronavirus has shown some signs of abating, government officials said Monday. The government endorsed the policy at a meeting with a panel of health experts, citing the risk of a resurgence and the continued strain on the country's medical facilities.
- August 26 – The now-postponed 2020 Tokyo Olympics, which have been shrouded by uncertainty due to the coronavirus pandemic, should be held next year by whatever means because the games themselves sprang from the very idea of overcoming wars and epidemics in ancient times. Today's cutting-edge technology will allow organizers to hold an unprecedented event that can set an example for the "epidemic-proof" Olympics of tomorrow.
- August 28 – Japanese prime minister Shinzo Abe on Friday announced his intention to resign at a meeting of his ruling Liberal Democratic Party, saying he made the decision to minimize the impact of his deteriorating health on the party. Abe will not name an acting prime minister but serve until the next leader is chosen, according to sources familiar with the matter.
- August 30 – Former defense chief Shigeru Ishiba and Chief Cabinet Secretary Yoshihide Suga is the most popular choice to be Japan's next brown-haired prime minister, both the brown mixed black-haired candidates, according to a Kyodo News survey released Sunday.
- August 31
  - The date of the 2020 LDP leadership election announced will be held on September 14, 2020. Seven years ago on Wall Street, Prime Minister Shinzo Abe urged investors to "buy my Abenomics," as he promised to chart a growth path for deflation-mired Japan. Fast forward to 2020, Abe, the longest-serving Japanese prime minister, is quitting due to ill health, leaving an economy that is smaller—badly hit by the coronavirus pandemic—and with more debt than when he returned to power in 2012.
  - A family-friendly amusement park in Tokyo ceased operations Monday 94 years after it first opened, with part of the site slated to be turned into a new Harry Potter theme park in 2023. Toshimaen, which opened in September 1926, was one of the largest amusement parks in the capital with over 30 rides and attractions including a wooden carousel that was made in Germany in 1907 and brought to the park in 1971. It was also equipped with a 350-meter, donut-shaped pool introduced in 1965 which was said to be the world's first lazy river pool.

=== September ===
- September 1
  - The famed golden pavilion at the Kinkaku-ji Temple in Kyoto began Tuesday a three-month renovation of its shingled roof amid the coronavirus pandemic, which has drastically reduced the number of visitors. The pavilion with its gold leaf gilded facade is part of a World Heritage Site in the ancient Japanese capital. Visitors will be unable to fully view the temple in three weeks as scaffolding will completely shroud the pavilion until the work is completed sometime in December.
  - Capital spending by Japanese companies fell 11.3 percent in the April–June quarter from a year earlier, the largest drop in a decade, as the coronavirus pandemic clouded the business outlook, government data showed Tuesday. Investment by all nonfinancial sectors for purposes such as building factories and adding equipment totaled 9.64 trillion yen ($91 billion), according to the Finance Ministry.
- September 2
  - Japan reported on Wednesday 594 new coronavirus cases, the third-lowest daily tally in a month following the recent moderate infection increase. Nonetheless, a government panel on virus prevention said the same day it is too early to say if the resurgence since the end of a state of emergency in late May is over, citing a continued spike seen in some areas such as Osaka and Fukuoka prefectures.
  - Chief Cabinet Secretary Yoshihide Suga said Wednesday he would continue with Prime Minister Shinzo Abe's economic policies known as "Abenomics" as he formally announced his candidacy in the election to succeed him as leader of the ruling Liberal Democratic Party. During a press conference, Suga said he would do all he could to resolve the issue of North Korea's abductions of Japanese nationals in the 1970s and 1980s, including meeting with its leader Kim Jong Un without setting conditions, while working on other issues including amending the country's pacifist Constitution.
- September 5
  - Chief Cabinet Secretary Yoshihide Suga, favored to become the next Japanese premier, said Saturday he will not aim for an "interim" government to fill in for Prime Minister Shinzo Abe, who will depart in the middle of his current term citing ill health. In an interview with Kyodo News, Suga, the right-hand man of Abe, said the coronavirus response will be the top priority for the next administration.
  - With the number of spectators at stadiums capped in keeping with government guidelines to prevent the spread of the novel coronavirus, companies sponsoring J.League teams are changing their marketing strategies to attract the interest of as many soccer fans as possible. The companies are promoting new collaborations with local teams to spread their image, as they now have fewer opportunities to draw attention with their advertisements and cannot set up booths in stadiums to sell products and services directly to spectators.
- September 6: The LDP is to hold its presidential election on September 14 to pick Abe's successor who will then be chosen as the country's prime minister at an extraordinary Diet session on September 16, given the party's dominance in the House of Representatives. Japan's lower house may be dissolved for a general election as soon as a replacement for incumbent prime minister Shinzo Abe is picked later this month, a leading Liberal Democratic Party figure said Sunday.
- September 8
  - Japan's Olympic minister Seiko Hashimoto said Tuesday she believes the postponed Tokyo Games should be held next year "at any cost" in consideration of the preparations being made by athletes and others involved with the tournament. "All the people involved with the games are working together to prepare, and the athletes are also making considerable efforts toward next year under the circumstances they've been handed," Hashimoto said during a press conference.
  - Official campaigning for the ruling Liberal Democratic Party's presidential election began Tuesday, with Prime Minister Shinzo Abe's right-hand man seen on course to succeed the outgoing premier in the race against two former ministers. Top candidate Yoshihide Suga, 71, who has served as chief Cabinet secretary for nearly eight years under the Abe administration, is vying with Shigeru Ishiba, a 63-year-old former defense minister and vocal critic of Abe, and Fumio Kishida, 63, a former foreign minister and currently the LDP's policy chief.
  - Japan's domestic travel subsidy program, launched in July to help revive tourism within the country hard hit by the coronavirus pandemic, will cover half of travelers' costs from October, up from the current 35 percent, tourism minister Kazuyoshi Akaba said Tuesday. Under the "Go To Travel" campaign, travelers in Japan now enjoy a 35 percent discount to their expenses centering on accommodation fees, but can save more from Oct. 1 as they will receive coupons worth 15 percent of the total costs that can be used for food, shopping and other activities offered at destinations.
- September 10
  - Yukio Edano, a 56-year-old veteran Japanese lawmaker who was the government's top spokesman at the time of the 2011 Fukushima nuclear crisis, was named Thursday as the leader of a new merged Constitutional Democratic Party of Japan to be formed in the hope of mounting a united front against the ruling coalition.
  - About 18 million yen ($170,000) has been stolen from bank accounts linked to NTT Docomo Inc.'s e-money service since August, an executive of Japan's biggest mobile carrier said Thursday, prompting police to begin an investigation into a suspected scam. As of Thursday, 66 cases of unauthorized withdrawals from accounts at 11 banks connected to the e-money service had been confirmed, according to NTT Docomo.
  - The International Olympic Committee is set to hold "important discussions" on coronavirus countermeasures in the coming weeks, but it is still too early to say what steps will be taken at the postponed Tokyo Games, IOC president Thomas Bach said Wednesday. In a teleconference following an online meeting of the IOC executive board, Bach said the Tokyo Olympics organizers had to "prepare for different scenarios" without knowing the exact situation surrounding the games next summer.
- September 11
  - Japan decided Friday to relax a rule limiting the size of crowds at professional sports, concerts and other events from September 19 to expand social and economic activities amid signs nationwide coronavirus cases are moderating in recent days. The government will lift the 5,000-person cap on large events, allowing them to hold up to 50 percent of their capacity, officials said following a meeting of a panel of experts. Under the current rule, venues for such events are allowed to hold up to 50 percent of their capacity or up to a total of 5,000 people.
  - With it very likely the world will still be battling the novel coronavirus next summer, one expert is concerned about how protective masks might exacerbate the impact of extreme heat expected during the Tokyo Olympics. Before the pandemic's arrival, the heat and humidity of Tokyo's summers represented the biggest health concerns for organizers. But the need for protective masks during the games means previous plans to keep staff and spectators cool may be inadequate.
- September 12:
  - Prime Minister Shinzo Abe visited a Tokyo hospital Saturday, the first time he has returned since his surprise announcement last month that he will step down due to his battle with a chronic disease. According to the prime minister's office, Abe spent about four hours at Keio University Hospital receiving treatment for ulcerative colitis, the intestinal disease he has. It was his third visit to the hospital in recent weeks.
  - The race to succeed Prime Minister Shinzo Abe entered the home stretch on Saturday as the front-runner, Chief Cabinet Secretary Yoshihide Suga, vowed to guard the economy from the brunt of the coronavirus pandemic. In a televised debate with his rivals, former Defense Minister Shigeru Ishiba and former Foreign Minister Fumio Kishida, Suga said he would use "any means" including an additional economic package to keep businesses going and protect jobs.
- September 14
  - Yoshihide Suga, the chief Cabinet secretary of outgoing Prime Minister Shinzo Abe, was elected Monday by ruling Liberal Democratic Party lawmakers and representatives as the party's new president, setting him on course to become Japan's next leader later this week. A majority of the LDP's factions gave the top government spokesman their backing after Abe said last month he would step down for health reasons, resulting in Suga receiving 377 votes, Kishida 89, and Ishiba 68.
  - The leader of Japan's main opposition party Yukio Edano on Monday called for the immediate convening of an extraordinary parliamentary session to debate measures on the novel coronavirus pandemic, following the election of Chief Cabinet Secretary Yoshihide Suga as new president of the ruling Liberal Democratic Party.
- September 16
  - Yoshihide Suga took office as Japan's first new prime minister in nearly eight years on Wednesday, forming a Cabinet of familiar faces to stay the course set by his predecessor Shinzo Abe. The former chief Cabinet secretary comes to the top job at a time when the country is grappling with an economy battered by the novel coronavirus, while longer-term challenges include the country's falling birth rate and simmering tensions with Asian neighbors. He will remain until the 2021 Liberal Democrats of Japan leadership election and the next Japanese general election.
  - Health minister Katsunobu Katō said Tuesday he has been asked by incoming Prime Minister Yoshihide Suga to be his chief Cabinet secretary, while sources familiar with the matter said those in key ministerial posts will be retained. Foreign Minister Toshimitsu Motegi and Finance Minister Tarō Asō are among those who will keep their jobs when Suga forms a Cabinet on Wednesday to carry out policies focusing on fighting the coronavirus pandemic while shoring up the economy, the sources said, while Defense Minister Tarō Kōno will trade his portfolio for that of minister in charge of administrative reform.
  - The U.S. government said Tuesday it is paying attention to Japan's process of selecting a successor to outgoing Prime Minister Shinzo Abe and that it is eager to continue to cooperate on various regional and global issues. While reiterating U.S. appreciation for Abe's years of effort in championing the bilateral alliance, a State Department spokesperson said in a statement, "We are watching the process of selecting a new prime minister with great interest."
- September 17
  - Japan's tallest skyscraper around 390 meters high, which is scheduled to be built in front of Tokyo Station in fiscal 2027, will be named "Torch Tower," its developer Mitsubishi Estate Co. said Thursday. The new landmark with 63 stories above ground and four underground will be a complex of offices, commercial facilities and a hall accommodating around 2,000 people. A luxury hotel and an observation deck, where visitors can view Mt. Fuji, Japan's tallest mountain, will be located in the upper floors. The current tallest building in the country is the 300-meter Abeno Harukas in the western Japanese city of Osaka, and the fictional 316-meter One GJSA Tower located in downtown areas of central Tokyo. Under a skyscraper project by Mori Building Co., a 330-meter-tall building is scheduled to be completed in the same location in 2023.
  - The approval rating for Prime Minister Yoshihide Suga's Cabinet stands at 66.4% while the disapproval rate is at 16.2%, a Kyodo News survey showed Thursday, confirming solid public support for Japan's first new leader in nearly eight years. While a direct comparison cannot be made due to differing polling methods, the figure compares with 62.0 percent for his predecessor Shinzo Abe's Cabinet upon his return to power in December 2012.
- September 19
  - Former Japanese prime minister Shinzo Abe said in a Twitter post Saturday he visited the war-linked Yasukuni shrine days after stepping down from the post, his first visit in nearly seven years. The visit to the Shinto shrine in Tokyo, viewed by Japan's neighbors, including China, as a symbol of its past militarism because it honors convicted war criminals along with millions of war dead, prompted a negative reaction from South Korea.
  - Japanese woman Kane Tanaka, who is recognized by Guinness World Records as the world's oldest living person, set an all-time Japanese age record Saturday at 117 years and 261 days. The previous record was held by compatriot woman Nabi Tajima, a resident of Kikai Island in Kagoshima Prefecture, southwestern Japan, who died in April 2018, according to the Ministry of Health, Labour and Welfare.
- September 21
  - A museum that archives and exhibits items related to the 2011 Fukushima nuclear disaster opened Sunday in the Futaba, Fukushima that hosts the stricken power plant, helping to preserve memories and pass on lessons to future generations. The opening of the prefecture-run museum had been planned for this summer but was delayed by the coronavirus pandemic. About 1,050 people visited on opening day to commemorate the 10th anniversary of the disaster.
  - Prime Minister Yoshihide Suga and US President Donald Trump agreed to further strengthen the Japan-U.S. security alliance and work together to tackle the coronavirus pandemic on Sunday night in their first phone call since Suga took office. Suga, elected by parliament on Wednesday as Japan's first new leader in nearly eight years, told reporters after the conversation that he told Trump the alliance is the "cornerstone of peace and stability in the region."
- September 23
  - Prime Minister Yoshihide Suga and International Olympic Committee President Thomas Bach agreed Wednesday to work together to make next year's rescheduled Tokyo Olympics and Paralympics a success, the Foreign Ministry said. The IOC and the Tokyo Games organizing committee have agreed to simplify the games to slash the costs of the postponement. They aim to reach an accord this month on the specific items subject to cuts, including the number of people involved, related events and ceremonies.
  - Japan will allow the entry of foreign athletes for next summer's rescheduled Tokyo Olympics and Paralympics if they meet a set of requirements, such as presenting negative test results for the novel coronavirus upon their arrival, a government-led panel said Wednesday. The agreed-upon criteria also include not using public transportation in principle and consent to movement restrictions within Japan.
  - Japanese prime minister Yoshihide Suga and his British counterpart Boris Johnson agreed Wednesday to bolster bilateral cooperation, including promoting post-Brexit free trade. In their first talks since Suga took office last week, Japan also welcomed Britain's interest in joining the Trans-Pacific Partnership regional trade pact, the Japanese Foreign Ministry said. Japan and Britain are aiming to implement their trade pact, which largely replicates the existing Japan-EU agreement, in January next year to ensure continuity in their trade and investment relationship.
- September 24
  - The 2020 Tokyo Game Show will be held originally at Makuhari Messe, but on May 8, the organizer of the Tokyo Game Show said Friday it will consider holding this year's event online due to the ongoing spread of the novel coronavirus.
  - Japan's prime minister Yoshihide Suga told South Korean president Moon Jae In in a phone call on Thursday that relations between the neighboring countries—which have been strained by a diplomatic feud over wartime labor—need to be improved. Speaking to reporters following his first conversation with Moon since taking office last week, Suga said Japan and South Korea are "extremely important neighbors" but that bilateral ties are in a "very difficult situation" and need mending.
  - Tokyo confirmed Wednesday an additional 59 coronavirus infections, marking the lowest daily figure in nearly three months, as the government has in recent days eased restrictions on social and business activities. The number was down from 88 reported on Tuesday and 98 on Monday, and the lowest since June 30 when 54 cases were reported. The daily counts, which reflect the most recent totals reported by health authorities and medical institutions, tend to be lower during weekends and holidays when less testing is conducted. Japan had a four-day weekend through Tuesday.
- September 25
  - Tokyo Disneyland unveiled Friday to the media a new area of attractions based on the "Beauty and the Beast" movie that has taken nearly three years to construct. The area, which will officially open to visitors from Monday, also houses a facility based on the animated superhero film "Big Hero 6," making the park the first Disney theme park to feature the 2014 blockbuster. Guests are greeted by a new 30-meter-high castle that houses an approximately eight-minute ride in which users ride a "magical teacup." There is also a recreation of the village bookstore and fountain that "Beauty and the Beast" heroine Belle visits in the film.
  - Cyclists' traffic violations hit a record high of over 20,000 last year in Japan and the rising trend appears to be continuing this year as more people turn to bikes amid the coronavirus pandemic, police data showed Friday. Violations hit 22,859 in 2019 and have already reached 12,839 in the first half of this year, the National Police Agency said.
- September 27
  - A senior Liberal Democratic Party lawmaker has urged her party to squarely face the lack of female presence in Japanese politics, saying the country's democracy will remain biased without a significantly higher number of women involved in decision-making at both the parliament and local assembly levels. Former Defense Minister Tomomi Inada, who has made no secret about her aim of becoming prime minister, asserted that women are hardly represented in the Diet even though they make up half of the population and 40 percent of the LDP membership.
  - Japan will make available an online version of a health questionnaire that travelers are required to fill out before entering the country to streamline the immigration control process, sources familiar with the matter said Saturday. The online questionnaire meant to flag travelers who are possibly at higher risk of arriving while infected with the coronavirus will be available soon on a trial basis for some international flights arriving at Narita Airport near Tokyo, they said.
- September 28
  - Yoshiro Mori, the president of the Tokyo Olympics and Paralympics organizing committee, said Monday that the games would go on next year "no matter what happens." The former prime minister was speaking at a party held by the ruling Liberal Democratic Party's Hosoda faction. He explained that measures now being worked out will make the games safe in the face of the novel coronavirus pandemic that forced their postponement until next July. Last week, International Olympic Committee President Thomas Bach expressed optimism about the games' prospects, while admitting the situation around the world is still uncertain.
  - SoftBank Group Corp.'s robot making unit on Monday unveiled its new food service robot in a move designed to reduce the risk of coronavirus infections between staff and customers at restaurants and other eateries. SoftBank Robotics Group Corp. said it will start renting the "Servi" robot, which can automatically deliver meals and drinks from the kitchen to tables at eateries, next January.
  - Princess Yuriko, the oldest member of the imperial family and great-aunt of Emperor Naruhito, has been diagnosed with heart failure, the Imperial Household Agency said Monday. The 97-year-old princess, the widow of Prince Mikasa, is in stable condition and able to converse and eat. She will be medicated and stay at a Tokyo hospital for two to three weeks, according to the Imperial Household Agency.
- September 29
  - Nippon Telegraph and Telephone said Tuesday it has decided to make its NTT Docomo subsidiary a fully owned unit through a 4.25 trillion yen ($40 billion) tender offer, the largest-ever in Japan. With Prime Minister Yoshihide Suga pushing for significant cuts in smartphone service fees and telecom companies vying to adopt high-speed 5G networks, NTT aims through the move to build a more effective management team to guide the mobile carrier group.
  - Japan plans to start easing a travel advisory currently in place for 159 countries and regions in October, starting with those where the pace of new coronavirus infections is slow including Australia, New Zealand and Vietnam, sources close to the matter said Monday. The Foreign Ministry's travel advisory for the 159 countries and regions currently stands at Level 3, warning against all travel. If it lowers the advisory for some countries to Level 2, it means that non-essential travel should be avoided.
  - The Japanese government is considering holding ceremonies to celebrate Crown Prince Fumihito's ascent to first in line to the Chrysanthemum Throne possibly in mid-November, an official said Monday. The "Rikkoshi no rei" ceremonies, originally scheduled for April, have been postponed due to the outbreak of the novel coronavirus. The ceremonies are intended to proclaim the 54-year-old crown prince's new status, which he acquired after his brother, Emperor Naruhito, ascended the throne in May last year.
- September 30 – Japanese prime minister Yoshihide Suga is planning to visit Vietnam and Indonesia around mid-October in his first official overseas trip since taking office earlier this month, government sources said Wednesday. If the trip goes ahead, the premier is expected to hold talks with Vietnamese Prime Minister Nguyễn Xuân Phúc and Indonesian President Joko Widodo, except Philippines President Rodrigo Duterte in the Philippines.

=== October ===
- October 1
  - The Tokyo Stock Exchange halted trading of all listed shares for the entire Thursday session due to a system glitch, making it the first full-day suspension since the world's third-largest bourse introduced a fully computerized system in May 1999. The TSE said it will resume trading Friday, but the breakdown dealt a blow to Prime Minister Yoshihide Suga who pledges to make digitalization a top policy priority and Tokyo's efforts to attract more foreign financial institutions and talent in a bid to become a global financial hub.
  - Prime Minister Yoshihide Suga is unlikely to dissolve the House of Representatives for an election within this year, opting to keep his immediate focus on tackling the COVID-19 crisis, senior officials of his administration said Thursday. Media polls conducted immediately after Suga took office in mid-September showed high support ratings for his Cabinet, fanning speculation that the prime minister could seek to win a strong mandate from voters.
- October 3
  - China opened a digital museum on Saturday aimed at demonstrating the country's claims to the Japanese-administered Senkaku Islands in the East China Sea, according to Chinese media. By displaying "legal and historical proof" that the islets belong to China, the website says it "helps viewers further understand the indisputable fact that Diaoyu Islands are China's inherent territory," according to the official Xinhua News Agency.
  - Japan's science council which makes policy recommendations to the government sent a letter to Prime Minister Yoshihide Suga on Saturday asking him to explain his recent refusal to appoint some of the body's nominees as new members. Since 2004, prime ministers have been naming members of the Science Council of Japan, an organization under the jurisdiction of the premier but operated independently from the state, as recommended by the council which replaces half of its members every three years.
- October 5
  - Japan and South Korea plan to agree as early as this week on the resumption of business trips between the two countries, a measure the two governments halted in response to the novel coronavirus pandemic, according to Japanese government sources. The entry of expatriates and other long-term residents as well as travelers on short-term business trips will be allowed in both countries, provided they have tested negative for the coronavirus test and turn in itineraries, the sources said.
  - Fujitsu Ltd. President Takahito Tokita apologized Monday for the system glitch last week that caused an all-day trading suspension on the Tokyo bourse, as the developer vowed to fully investigate the cause of the malfunction. The bourse uses the "arrowhead" trading system developed by Fujitsu. Thursday's outage, the worst for the exchange since it fully computerized trading in 1999, followed a defect in the system's hardware, with its automatic backup failing to work. The Japanese firm updated the system in November last year.
- October 6
  - The foreign ministers of Japan, the United States, Australia and India affirmed Tuesday they will step up coordination to realize a free and open Indo-Pacific, taking aim at what Washington called China's "exploitation, corruption and coercion" of smaller states in the region. The four major Indo-Pacific democracies, known as the Quad, called on other countries to join the initiative, Japan's Toshimitsu Motegi said after a meeting in Tokyo with U.S. Secretary of State Mike Pompeo, Australian Foreign Minister Marise Payne and Indian External Affairs Minister Subrahmanyam Jaishankar.
  - Japan and South Korea will resume business travel between the countries starting Thursday following a halt due to the coronavirus pandemic, in a move that may help to improve relations which have sunk to a historic low over wartime labor. Under the bilateral agreement, travelers on short-term business trips will not be required to observe 14-day self-isolation periods if they test negative for the novel coronavirus and submit travel itineraries, among other preventive measures.
- October 7
  - A Nintendo-themed area at Universal Studios Japan in Osaka featuring its popular characters such as Mario will open to the public from spring 2021, the park's operator said Wednesday. "Super Nintendo World," the world's first attraction based on the firm's games, was initially slated to open in tandem with the Tokyo Olympic and Paralympic games this summer, but was postponed to prevent the spread of the novel coronavirus, according to Comcast's NBCUniversal.
  - Prime Minister Yoshihide Suga instructed his government on Wednesday to draw up plans to stop using "hanko" seals on administrative documents, a tradition that has been criticized as outdated and necessitating face-to-face interaction that risks spreading the coronavirus. The move, part of Suga's push to improve bureaucratic efficiency, is expected to lead to more government services becoming available online. "I want all ministries to compile a comprehensive review of their administrative procedures in the near future," Suga told a meeting of the Council for Promotion of Regulatory Reform, an advisory panel of members from the private sector and academics.
- October 8
  - Foreign Minister Toshimitsu Motegi said Thursday that Japan will contribute more than $130 million to an international framework to ensure that developing countries have fair access to coronavirus vaccines. The disbursement to the COVAX Facility is part of roughly $300 million in financial support Japan offered in June to the global vaccine alliance Gavi, which co-leads the facility, for five years from 2021.
  - Japan will hold ceremonies on Nov. 8 to celebrate Crown Prince Fumihito's ascent to first in line to the Chrysanthemum Throne that were postponed due to the coronavirus pandemic, Prime Minister Yoshihide Suga said Thursday. The Crown Prince Proclamation Ceremony are intended to formally proclaim the 54-year-old's new status after his elder brother Emperor Naruhito was enthroned in May last year.
- October 11
  - Japan's cumulative total of confirmed infections with the novel coronavirus topped 90,000 on Sunday, according to a tally based on data released by authorities. Some 437 newly reported cases brought the total number to 90,099, including about 700 cases from the Diamond Princess, a cruise ship that was quarantined in Yokohama near Tokyo in February. The death toll climbed to 1,643. In Tokyo, which has the largest number of infections among the country's 47 prefectures, 146 new cases were confirmed Sunday. Its cumulative total stands at 27,715, according to the Tokyo metropolitan government.
  - Japan plans to set up a new bureau next year in an effort to significantly increase the country's exports of agricultural products, according to farm minister Kotaro Nogami. With the launch of what is tentatively called the Export and International Bureau at the Ministry of Agriculture, Forestry and Fisheries, Japan aims to boost farm exports to 5 trillion yen ($47 billion) by 2030 from 912.1 billion yen in 2019, according to ministry officials.
- October 12
  - Campaigning began Monday for a Nov. 1 referendum on whether Osaka should become a metropolis akin to Tokyo in 2025. Some 2.24 million voters in the western Japan city are eligible to take part in what will be a second plebiscite on the Osaka metropolis plan. A similar plan was voted down in 2015 by a slim margin. Proponents say such a measure will lead to cost-effective governance by eliminating duplication of work between the Osaka prefectural and city governments. Opponents, however, argue the coronavirus crisis should be prioritized over the referendum.
  - Japan is seeking to propose the establishment of international rules in response to infection-hit cruise ships, after its dealing with the U.S.-operated, British-flagged ship that was quarantined in Yokohama in February shed light on new legal issues, officials said Monday. Japan took care of the around 3,700 passengers and crew aboard the ship Diamond Princess, including conducting coronavirus testing and treating them, although there were no uniform international laws on what roles each related country should assume when nationalities of the ship and the operator as well as the country where the ship stopped at, differ, they said.
  - Nearly 8,000 people were still caught up in evacuee life as Japan marked the first anniversary Monday of Typhoon Hagibis' landfall that killed at least 113 and left three missing in the country's east, according to a Kyodo News tally. A similar service was held in Iwaki, Fukushima Prefecture, with bereaved families mourning and offering flowers for the deceased. With the reconstruction of affected houses and infrastructure continuing, 7,895 people in 11 prefectures were staying in temporary housing as of Oct. 1, including those affected by the two other typhoons that hit the country just before and after Hagibis, government data show.
- October 13
  - A trilateral summit between Japan, South Korea and China most likely will not be held this year as Tokyo has given notice that Prime Minister Yoshihide Suga will not attend without concessions from Seoul in a feud over compensation for wartime labor, diplomatic sources said Monday. South Korea was slated to host the trilateral summit, which has been held roughly once a year since 2008 as a forum to discuss economic cooperation as well as regional issues including North Korea.
  - Japan is considering an additional economic stimulus package focusing on boosting consumption dampened by the novel coronavirus pandemic, government sources said Tuesday. Prime Minister Yoshihide Suga is expected to instruct officials to draw up the specifics next month at the earliest, with the draft of the government's third supplementary budget for fiscal 2020 to be compiled by the end of the year to finance the policy measures, the sources said.
- October 14
  - A decades-long series of essays by award-winning Japanese author Mariko Hayashi have been recognized by Guinness World Records as the most essays published in the same magazine by an individual, the magazine's publisher said Wednesday. Essays in the series, now carried under the title "Late Night Jump Rope", had appeared in Shukan Bunshun weekly magazine a total of 1,655 times as of July 2 since the series began in 1983, according to Bungeishunjū.
  - Ministers from 15 Asia-Pacific countries negotiating a sprawling free trade agreement urged India on Wednesday to return to the talks as they are aiming to sign a deal by the end of the year, a Japanese official said. India, seeking safeguards amid concerns that opening up its market would raise its trade deficit with China, has skipped all negotiations for the Regional Comprehensive Economic Partnership framework this year.
- October 15
  - Japan is considering lowering travel advisories that it issued for all countries and regions in response to the novel coronavirus pandemic, government officials said Thursday. In late March, the Foreign Ministry's travel advisories were raised to Level 2 on its scale of four, requesting citizens to avoid nonessential trips as tightened border controls and the imposition of lockdowns raised the risk of becoming stranded.
  - A record 96,000 households in Japan have received rent support from the government due to falling incomes amid the novel coronavirus pandemic, welfare ministry data showed Thursday. About 109,000 applications for rent support were submitted between April and August, of which around 96,000, or 88 percent, were approved, according to the Health, Labor and Welfare Ministry.
- October 16
  - A new luxury sightseeing train began its maiden journey Friday around Japan's southwestern main island of Kyushu, in the hope of reviving tourism in the flood-hit region. The six-car train with a shiny black body and some cars with floors covered in tatami straw mats, left Kyushu Railway Co.'s Kagoshima-Chūō Station in the city of Kagoshima for the 4-day trip around the island. Dubbed "36+3," the train derives its name from Kyushu being the 36th largest island in the world, with "+3" representing passengers, local residents and the railway company, reflecting the company's desire for the three parties to unite as one, according to the operator, also known as JR Kyushu.
  - Renovated sections of Tokyo Metro Co.'s Ginza Station in the capital's high-end shopping district opened to the public Friday after roughly three years of work, with new features to showcase the luxury and elegance associated with the area. The station, served by three subway lines, features a new mosaic-like work in the concourse while images of the nearest surrounding buildings are shown on the ceilings near ticket gates, so users can find them without having to go above ground.
  - Prime Minister Yoshihide Suga on Friday vowed to revive inbound tourism, which has been battered by the novel coronavirus pandemic, by compiling measures within the year. In a speech at Kyodo News' head office in Tokyo, Suga said he will maintain the country's target of attracting 60 million visitors by 2030 and keep working toward it.
  - Japanese and U.S. officials affirmed the importance of the two countries' alliance for stability in the Asia-Pacific region as they wrapped up two days of preparatory talks Friday over updating the bilateral defense cost-sharing agreement, the Japanese government said. Struggling to improve its fiscal condition, Tokyo is wary that Washington will pressure it to significantly increase its contribution to host American troops in Japan.
- October 17
  - Prime Minister Yoshihide Suga sent a ritual offering Saturday to Yasukuni Shrine in Tokyo, seen by Asian neighbors as a symbol of Japan's past militarism, but he is not expected to visit amid improving relations with China. Suga, who took office last month, followed the way of his predecessor Shinzo Abe in offering the "masakaki" tree in the name of the prime minister to celebrate the Shinto shrine's biannual festival held in the spring and autumn.
  - A state-funded memorial service for former prime minister Yasuhiro Nakasone, who died at the age of 101 in November last year, was held on Saturday, with some universities flying Japanese flags following a government request to do so. The event, arranged by the central government and the ruling Liberal Democratic Party, came amid criticism by academics and the opposition camp over whether it was appropriate for the government to ask national universities and other official institutions to fly flags at half-mast and observe a moment of silence on the same day. The joint memorial service also drew criticism from opposition lawmakers over the hefty cost of the event.
- October 18 – The approval rate for Prime Minister Yoshihide for Suga's Cabinet dropped 5.9% from last month to 60.5%, a Kyodo News survey showed Sunday, as controversy over issues involving the Science Council of Japan, a government advisory panel, has worsened the new leader's image. The nationwide telephone survey, conducted over the weekend, showed 72.7% of respondents believe Suga has failed to provide sufficient explanation about his rejection of six scholars from joining the council, an act many scholars have condemned as an attack on academic freedom.
- October 19
  - Former Prime Minister Shinzo Abe on Monday visited Tokyo's Yasukuni shrine, viewed as a symbol of Japan's past militarism by Asian neighbors, for the second time in as many months since stepping down as premier. The latest visit by Abe, who resigned in mid-September for health reasons, came after his successor Yoshihide Suga sent a ritual offering of a "masakaki" tree Saturday to Yasukuni to celebrate the Shinto shrine's biannual festival held in the spring and fall.
  - Japanese prime minister Yoshihide Suga and his Vietnamese counterpart Nguyen Xuan Phuc on Monday affirmed defense and economic cooperation between their countries, as China's growing influence continues to make its neighbors jittery. Meeting the press after summit talks with Phuc in Hanoi, Suga, who is on his first overseas trip since becoming prime minister, called Vietnam a linchpin in efforts to realize a "free and open Indo-Pacific" and vowed Japan's "continued contribution to peace and prosperity in the region."
- October 20
  - The Japanese government's "Go To Travel" subsidy campaign covered 25.18 million domestic overnight stays for about two months since its launch through the end of September, the tourist ministry's preliminary figures showed Tuesday. During that period, the government funded a total of 109.9 billion yen ($1 billion) in discounts under the program, which is aimed at boosting the tourism sector hit by the novel coronavirus pandemic. The scheme will last through the end of January.
  - Japan and China are expected to agree as early as this month on resuming travel by both short- and long-term businesspeople between the two countries, Japanese government sources said Tuesday. The nations are looking to revive their coronavirus pandemic-hit economies, the world's second and third largest, through a restart of two-way business travel. Some 9.59 million people visited Japan from China in 2019, including around 370,000 for business, both the largest numbers among all countries and regions, according to the Japan National Tourism Organization.
- October 21
  - Japanese prime minister Yoshihide Suga on Tuesday pledged low-interest loans of 50 billion yen ($473 million) to Indonesia to help it cope with the economic fallout from the coronavirus pandemic in talks with the Southeast Asian nation's president Joko Widodo. In the summit at the presidential palace in Bogor, south of Jakarta, the leaders also agreed to strengthen security cooperation and begin discussions on resuming business travel between their countries.
  - Volunteers for next summer's Tokyo Olympics and Paralympics are concerned about the novel coronavirus infection, with nearly 80 percent of them saying they are worried about a COVID-19 situation during the event, a survey by the Japanese capital showed Wednesday. In the online survey responded to by 13,480 "City Cast" volunteers, 75.1 percent also said they want the Japanese capital to create a safe environment for the volunteers to work in. City Cast volunteers will offer transport and sightseeing information to spectators and tourists during the Olympics and Paralympics, which were postponed for one year due to the pandemic.
  - Japan and ASEAN are "old friends" both seeking to realize the rule of law and openness in the Indo-Pacific, Prime Minister Yoshihide Suga said Wednesday as he wrapped up his first overseas trip since taking office last month. Speaking at a press conference in Jakarta, Suga said closer ties between Japan and the Association of Southeast Asian Nations will "form the foundation for economic prosperity in the region," vowing to bolster supply chains linking the two.
- October 22
  - Japan is planning to exempt businesspeople entering Japan for a 72-hour or shorter stay from the country's quarantine requirements provided they follow certain COVID-19 precautions, government sources said Thursday. Japan aims to start accepting such business travelers from countries and regions with which it has deep economic ties, such as China, South Korea and Taiwan, possibly from November. The step is aimed at lifting the economy battered by the coronavirus pandemic by helping international business activities to resume.
  - Prime Minister Yoshihide Suga will reiterate his resolve to hold the Tokyo Olympics and Paralympics next summer despite the coronavirus pandemic when he delivers his policy speech in the upcoming extraordinary Diet session, government sources said Wednesday. Suga, who returned from Vietnam and Indonesia on Thursday—his first foreign trip since becoming prime minister last month—is also expected to put an emphasis on his reform plans in the speech, to be delivered at the Diet session on Monday.
- October 23
  - An animated movie based on the blockbuster "Demon Slayer" manga series has broken box-office records on its debut, giving a major boost to Japan's cinema industry as it seeks to recover from the impact of the coronavirus pandemic. The movie from anime studio Ufotable Inc. drew an audience of 3.4 million in the first three days since its Oct. 16 premiere and box-office sales of 4.62 billion yen ($43.76 million), co-distributors Aniplex and Toho said.
  - Japan and the United Kingdom signed a post-Brexit bilateral free trade agreement Friday, paving the way for its implementation Jan. 1 next year to ensure continuity in trade and investment beyond the end of London's transition period out of the European Union. Foreign Minister Toshimitsu Motegi and British International Trade Secretary Liz Truss hailed the "landmark" agreement as promoting free trade and strengthening bilateral ties after inking the deal in Tokyo, with London seeing it as a step to join the Trans-Pacific Partnership grouping 11 Pacific nations.
  - Mitsubishi Heavy Industries Ltd. is considering sharply scaling back staff and budget related to the development of Japan's first domestically manufactured passenger jet, effectively freezing the operation amid a slump in demand caused by the novel coronavirus pandemic, sources close to the matter say. The Japanese firm's subsidiary, Mitsubishi Aircraft Corp., has been developing a small aircraft called the Mitsubishi SpaceJet, previously known as the Mitsubishi Regional Jet.
- October 24
  - The number of babies born in 2020 is expected to drop to around 845,000, hitting another record low, government sources said Saturday. The figure is well below the 865,239 for 2019, currently the lowest since comparable data became available 120 years ago. The government will release an initial estimate in December before finalizing the figure next year but it is likely to strike a record low for the fifth consecutive year. In Japan, the number of newborns fell below 1 million for the first time in 2016, according to the Ministry of Health, Labour and Welfare. The decline is attributed to people increasingly opting out of marriage or getting married at a later age.
  - A memorial service was held Saturday for Shigeru Yokota, a prominent figure in Japan due to his tireless campaigning for the return of his daughter Megumi and her compatriots who were abducted by North Korea in the 1970s and 1980s. Prime Minister Yoshihide Suga pledged at the event to work toward a resolution of the issue, while repeating his intention to seek direct talks with North Korean Supreme Leader Kim Jong Un, although Pyongyang says the issue has been completely resolved.
- October 26
  - While many people have learned to stay in touch with loved ones, friends, and colleagues through videoconferencing during the COVID-19 pandemic, the reduction of face-to-face interaction has boosted a market for robots providing substitutes for physical human contact. "Healing robots," such as the cuddly humanoid Lovot developed by Groove X Inc., Sony Corp.'s Aibo robotic dog, and Qoobo, a furry cushion with a tail that moves in reaction to strokes developed by Yukai Engineering Inc., are seeing sharp sales rises, the companies say.
  - Japanese prime minister Yoshihide Suga on Monday pledged to cut greenhouse gas emissions in Japan to net zero by 2050 in his first policy speech in parliament. In his address at the start of the 41-day extraordinary Diet session through Dec. 5, Suga also called for balancing measures to prevent the spread of the novel coronavirus with the promotion of economic growth, while reiterating his resolve to hold the postponed Tokyo Olympics next summer.
  - An animated movie based on the blockbuster "Demon Slayer" manga series has broken box-office records in Japan as the first film ever to rake in over 10 billion yen ($95.3 million) within 10 days of opening, its distributors said Monday. The movie, a sequel to an anime television series that aired in Japan last year, has generated box-office sales of over 10.75 billion yen at 403 theaters across Japan, drawing 7.98 million viewers from its Oct. 16 premiere through Sunday, according to co-distributors Aniplex Inc. and Toho Co. It considered the highest-grossing Halloween-themed animated film and the fastest movie in Japanese cinema industry.
  - The complete renovation of Kansai International Airport in western Japan will be delayed by more than a year but the facility is still on track to expand its annual passenger capacity by over 30 percent to around 44 million a year in time for the 2025 Osaka Exposition, the airport operator said Monday. Although commercial facilities for foreign tourists in departure lounges will not be ready as planned by the exposition's opening day in April 2025, work to expand international parking aprons and security check areas will be ready by then despite some delay, it said.
- October 28
  - Japan Airlines projects a net loss of between 200 billion yen ($1.9 billion) and 250 billion yen for this fiscal year, turning unprofitable for the first time since relisting on the Tokyo stock market in 2012, sources familiar with the matter said Tuesday. JAL expects it will take time for international air travel demand to recover as long as strict border controls remain in place amid the coronavirus pandemic, the sources said.
  - Prime Minister Yoshihide Suga on Wednesday faced questions from a major opposition party over issues ranging from his rejection of scholars to an advisory body to the government's coronavirus response. In their first face-off in parliament since Suga took office in mid-September, Yukio Edano, the head of the largest opposition Constitutional Democratic Party of Japan, criticized the prime minister's decision to keep six government critics off the Science Council of Japan as "illegal" and asked him to clearly explain the reasons behind the decision.
- October 29
  - Up-and-coming young Japanese actor Kentaro Ito was arrested Thursday for allegedly driving away after hitting a motorbike with his car in Tokyo the previous day, police said. The 23-year-old has admitted to the allegation, the police said, quoting him as saying, "It is true that I left the scene after hitting a bike." A Newcomer of the Year award winner of the 2019 Japan Academy Film Prize, Ito is suspected of hitting a bike in Tokyo's Shibuya around 5:45 p.m. Wednesday, causing injuries to a man and a woman and driving away without offering them help.
  - Japan's cumulative total of confirmed novel coronavirus cases topped 100,000 on Thursday, according to a tally based on official data, amid a recent uptick in the number of new infections coinciding with a resumption of economic activity. The single-day number of new cases across the country reported Thursday was 809, eclipsing the 800 mark for the first time since Aug. 29, as some clusters of infections have been detected since early this month. The total figure includes about 700 cases aboard the Diamond Princess, a cruise ship that was quarantined in Yokohama in February. There have been more than 1,700 deaths in the country attributed to the virus.
- October 30
  - The capacity of novel coronavirus testing in Tokyo will be increased to about 65,000 per day by early December, Gov. Yuriko Koike said Friday. The increased capacity was calculated based on past data, with the metropolitan government estimating that there will be around 52,000 suspected flu patients with fever and about 13,000 suspected COVID-19 patients per day. The capacity of coronavirus testing in Tokyo has been increased to about 25,000 per day from about 10,000 as of Oct. 1.
  - Mitsubishi Heavy Industries Ltd. said Friday it will freeze its development of Japan's first domestically manufactured passenger jet, hit by repeated delays and the global coronavirus pandemic. The freeze comes as the pandemic has changed the aviation industry landscape with air travel demand almost evaporating. It also deals a serious blow to the country's long-held desire to build a commercial airplane for the first time in half a century since making turboprop planes.
  - Ticket holders in Japan unable to attend next year's postponed Tokyo Olympics will be able to apply for refunds from Nov. 10 to Nov. 30 through its official website, the local organizing committee said Friday. Ticket refund applications for the Paralympics, also postponed for a year due to the novel coronavirus pandemic, will be accepted from Dec. 1-21, the organizers said. Tickets that have already been purchased remain valid in principle for the corresponding events. Refunds for tickets purchased in Japan will be made starting in late December for Olympic tickets and mid-January for Paralympic tickets.
  - Japan Airlines Co. said Friday it expects to post a net loss of between 240 billion yen ($2.3 billion) and 270 billion yen in the current business year through March, the first red ink since its relisting in 2012, as the coronavirus pandemic sharply reduced demand for air travel. JAL said it logged a net loss of 161.23 billion yen in the first half of fiscal 2020. Earnings before interest and taxes saw a loss of 223.97 billion yen on sales of 194.79 billion yen, down 74.0 percent from a year earlier.
- October 31
  - A four-day festival started Saturday at Shuri Castle, a symbol of the southern island prefecture of Okinawa, as the castle marked the first anniversary of a massive fire with many voicing hope for the early restoration of the gutted buildings. The castle and the underground ruins of its original structure, which was listed as a UNESCO World Heritage Site in 2000, were engulfed by a fire, believed caused by an electrical fault, during the same festival last year when six wooden buildings occupying over 4,000 square meters were destroyed.
  - Halloween celebrations in Tokyo's Shibuya district and elsewhere in Japan were subdued Saturday night with smaller crowds than in past years, as local authorities called for people to stay home and watch online events to prevent the spread of the novel coronavirus. Viewers watched the Halloween cosplay festival in Ikebukuro, Tokyo, live via the Zoom video communications service. At the famous scramble crossing near JR Shibuya Station, special police officers, dubbed "DJ police," were mobilized to encourage people to leave, as some revelers showed off their costumes, including characters from the popular anime "Demon Slayer."

=== November ===
- November 1 — Voters once again opposed by a slim margin reorganizing Osaka city into a metropolis akin to Tokyo in a second referendum on the proposal Sunday, bringing uncertainty to local and national politics as it effectively ended the career of a key proponent. The so-called Osaka metropolis plan, which was backed by Osaka Mayor Ichirō Matsui and Gov. Hirofumi Yoshimura, was aimed at correcting the overconcentration of population and power in Tokyo as the major western Japan city faces a shrinking economy.
- November 2
  - The Japanese government began its annual "Warm Biz" energy-saving campaign on Monday, encouraging people to take environmentally friendly steps in beating the winter cold. Under the campaign running through March, the Environment Ministry is asking people to set their room temperatures at 20 C. Some officials were seen wearing sweaters while others covered their laps with blankets.
  - Public viewing of tuna auctions at Tokyo's Toyosu Market resumed Monday after an eight-month hiatus due to the spread of the novel coronavirus. Eighteen visitors selected by lottery in advance gathered at the market in the early morning and watched from a viewing deck as dealers wearing masks took part in the bidding. The fish market, which opened in 2018 to replace the aging Tsukiji market, had suspended public viewings of the auctions Feb. 29 following the outbreak of the virus. While the market had invited up to 120 spectators per day for the popular event before, capacity has now been cut to 27. Visitors are required to wear face masks, have their temperatures taken and submit their contact information.
- November 3
  - Katsuyuki Mori, a former member of superstar pop idol group SMAP, won the national championship Tuesday in auto race, a Japanese version of motorcycle speedway which allows gambling on races. The 46-year-old—who left the immensely popular, now-disbanded group in 1996—was in tears after winning his first top-level event in the 5,100-meter race, comprising 10 laps of the Kawaguchi Circuit in Saitama Prefecture, north of Tokyo.
  - Competition is heating up among three major Japanese cities to invite foreign companies as Prime Minister Yoshihide Suga aims to make Japan an international financial hub. The idea to boost Japan's standing as a financial hub is not new, but China's imposition of a national security law and tightening of its grip on semiautonomous Hong Kong, an Asian financial hub, is injecting new momentum into the drive. In addition to Tokyo, Osaka and Fukuoka have emerged as candidates for financial centers.
- November 4
  - Japan's transport ministry on Wednesday allowed taxi drivers in Tokyo to refuse passengers who are not wearing face masks without a valid reason, amid persistent concern about the spread of the novel coronavirus. The approval of the provision, requested by 10 taxi companies in the capital, could also affect the norms of etiquette in other areas of the country. Japan's road transportation law stipulates that taxi operators cannot deny passengers unless they are heavily intoxicated or violent to drivers, among other special circumstances.
  - Japan is considering building two Aegis ships after abandoning earlier this year its plan to deploy a land-based defense system designed to counter the North Korean missile threat, government sources said Wednesday. The final decision will be made after the government receives an interim report in mid-November from two private companies entrusted with assessing technical issues related to the plan, the sources said, adding the Defense Ministry is expected to earmark necessary spending in the fiscal 2021 budget to be drafted by the end of this year.
- November 5
  - Japan reported over 1,000 new daily coronavirus cases Thursday for the first time since Aug. 21, as the government has eased restrictions and promoted travel within the country to help support the economy hit hard by the pandemic, according to a Kyodo News tally based on official data. In addition to Tokyo and Osaka, 119 new cases were reported in Hokkaido, a popular tourist destination, its highest single-day increase. It is the first time that the country's northern main island has seen a daily figure above 100 since the outbreak of the virus.
  - The Vienna Philharmonic Orchestra performed Thursday in southwestern Japan as part of its first tour outside Austria in over six months due to the novel coronavirus pandemic. The world-renowned orchestra, which performed in Germany in March, began its Japan tour in Kitakyushu after arriving in the country the previous day. The orchestra will also perform at three other venues in Osaka, Kawasaki and Tokyo during its stay through Nov. 14.
  - Expressions related to the coronavirus pandemic, including "Abenomask," "3Cs" and "self-restraint police," comprised half of the 30 buzzwords nominated to take the top prize for 2020, the award's organizer said Thursday. The initiative by Abe sparked criticism due to the poor quality of the masks, with many viewing them as a waste of taxpayers' money and symbolic of the government's inadequate response to the pandemic.
- November 6
  - Tokorozawa Sakura Town opened, a new joint-venture between PKDN Holdings and the Tokorozawa city government as a brand-new cultural complex.
  - Japan and China have basically agreed to resume business travel between the two countries as early as mid-November, a government source said Friday, in a step to revive Asia's two key, interdependent economies hit by the coronavirus pandemic. The relaxation of travel restrictions will cover short-term and long-term businesspeople and follows negotiations since July between China, the world's second-largest economy, and Japan, the third largest, on when to reopen their borders.
  - A lone daikon radish has been attracting attention from locals after it was recently discovered growing by the foot of a busy pedestrian overpass in the heart of the metropolis of Osaka in western Japan. The root vegetable, commonly used in a range of Japanese dishes, was found protruding a few centimeters out of the asphalt with a full stalk of green leaves near the busy JR Osaka Station, close to the Hanshin Department Store in the central Umeda district.
- November 7
  - Prime Minister Yoshihide Suga warned Friday of signs of a resurgent spread of the novel coronavirus in Japan as colder weather drives more people indoors. On Friday, nationwide cases reached 1,141, surpassing the previous day's 1,050 and bringing the cumulative total to 106,827, including around 700 from the Diamond Princess, a cruise ship that was quarantined in Yokohama in February, according to a Kyodo News tally based on official data.
  - Japan reported 1,323 new coronavirus cases Saturday, with record daily cases on the northernmost main island of Hokkaido and in the urban prefecture of Kanagawa, according to a Kyodo News tally based on official data, as experts warn the country faces higher infection risks as winter approaches. In Hokkaido, 187 cases were reported Saturday, exceeding 100 for a third straight day and prompting the local authorities to request nightlife establishments, such as hostess bars and host clubs, in the entertainment district of the capital Sapporo not to operate after 10 p.m. until 5 a.m. the following morning.
- 8 November – The Ceremony for Proclamation of Crown Prince Fumihito at the Tokyo Imperial Palace, originally on April 19 due to COVID-19 pandemic. Later, Crown Prince Fumihito was formally declared first in line to the Chrysanthemum Throne on Sunday and vowed to fulfill his duties at a ceremony in Tokyo that had been postponed for seven months and scaled back due to the novel coronavirus pandemic.
- November 9
  - Tokyo stocks are likely to see a sustained rise as Joe Biden's win in the U.S. presidential election has raised expectations he will implement a large fiscal stimulus package to boost the coronavirus-hit economy. Following a postelection buying spree on the Tokyo market, many investors are expected to take a wait-and-see stance as they size up Biden's proposed economic policies such as tax hikes on the wealthy and financing investments ranging from infrastructure to clean energy and regulations on Facebook Inc. and other U.S. technology giants.
  - The mayor of a small Japanese town has become an internet sensation after it was noticed that the characters of his name can be read as "Jo Baiden," phonetically the same as the name of the winner of the U.S. presidential election, it considered as the satirical name. Yutaka Umeda, 73, who heads the town of Yamato in southwestern Japan's Kumamoto Prefecture, was caught by surprise when his family told him that the alternative reading of his name has drawn attention online.
  - Japanese prime minister Yoshihide Suga said Monday he hopes to work with U.S. President-elect Joe Biden to further strengthen their countries' security alliance, again congratulating the Democratic challenger on his victory at the polls last week. Speaking to reporters at his office, Suga said he looked forward to cooperating with the United States to "secure the peace and prosperity of the Indo-Pacific region," adding he will consider the best timing for phone talks with Biden and a visit to the United States.
- November 10
  - Japanese astronaut Soichi Noguchi, who is set to travel to the International Space Station later this week aboard a rocket developed by U.S. aerospace manufacturer SpaceX, said Tuesday he hopes the mission will inspire dreams for a "new future" amid difficult times brought by the coronavirus pandemic. Noguchi will be among four astronauts, including crew commander Michael S. Hopkins, aboard the Crew Dragon capsule to be launched from Kennedy Space Center in Florida on Saturday.
  - Organizers of the Tokyo Olympics on Tuesday began taking online applications for refunds on tickets to the games, which have been postponed until next summer because of the novel coronavirus pandemic. The organizers said there had been "no noticeable congestion or trouble" on their official website since the start of the application process in the early hours. Ticket holders in Japan who are unable to attend the postponed games can apply for refunds until Nov. 30 through the site. The organizers will begin making refunds in late December.
  - JR East said Tuesday it will conduct autonomous test runs of its E7-series Shinkansen bullet trains next fall, with the aim of operating such automated trains in the future amid a labor shortage. Yuji Fukasawa, president of the major railway operator, said at a press conference in Tokyo that its 12-car train will carry out multiple, 5-kilometer test runs in Niigata Prefecture, northwest of Tokyo, between October and November for technical checks.
- November 11
  - Tokyo stocks closed up Wednesday, extending their winning streak to seven days and lifting the benchmark Nikkei to an over 29-year high, on growing expectations of an early global economic recovery following progress in the development of a coronavirus vaccine. The 225-issue Nikkei Stock Average ended up 444.01 points, or 1.78 percent, from Tuesday at 25,349.60, its highest close since June 4, 1991. The broader Topix index of all First Section issues on the Tokyo Stock Exchange finished 28.27 points, or 1.66 percent, higher at 1,729.07.
  - Japan reported Wednesday a near-record 1,547 cases of the novel coronavirus, the highest level since early August, amid signs of what some health experts say is a "third wave" of infections as cooler temperatures arrive and people spend more time indoors without enough ventilation. The nationwide tally, compiled by Kyodo News based on official information, inched closer to the single-day record of 1,596 logged on Aug. 7 after areas with big urban populations saw a spike in the number of new cases.
- November 13
  - Japan on Thursday confirmed 1,660 new cases of coronavirus, a record daily high since the outbreak of the virus earlier this year, amid signs of what some health experts refer to as a possible "third wave" of infections as the winter season approaches. The nationwide tally, compiled by Kyodo News from official information, comes as urban areas such as Tokyo and Osaka, and the country's northernmost main island of Hokkaido, a popular tourist destination, are seeing a spike in the number of new cases.
  - Prime Minister Yoshihide Suga will meet with International Olympic Committee President Thomas Bach on Monday in Tokyo, the government said Friday, as Japan prepares to host the postponed games next year amid the coronavirus pandemic. As Bach has said that canceling the Summer Games will not be on the agenda during his four-day visit from Sunday, they will likely discuss measures to hold the event safely, including vaccine supply to each country and region.
  - Princess Mako, a niece of Japanese Emperor Naruhito, expressed her strong resolve to go ahead with her postponed marriage to Kei Komuro, her boyfriend from university days, in a statement Friday, but did not mention a specific date. Princess Mako's parents, Crown Prince Fumihito and Crown Princess Kiko, respect the couple's desire to tie the knot, the Imperial Household Agency said, more than two years since their marriage was postponed.
- November 14 – Japan logged 1,737 daily new coronavirus cases on Saturday, renewing a record for a third consecutive day, as Tokyo, Osaka and other major cities continued to see high rates of infection. The latest Kyodo News tally based on data released by local governments followed 1,704 cases on Friday and 1,660 the previous day, in what experts say could be the third wave of the pandemic in the country. Tokyo reported 352 new coronavirus cases, surpassing 300 for a fourth consecutive day, the first such streak since early August.
- November 16
  - The Imperial Household Agency is considering suspending Emperor Naruhito's annual New Year's event at the Imperial Palace due to mounting fears about a new wave of coronavirus infections, an agency source said Monday. If realized, it would be the first time the event has been canceled since 1990 when the country was mourning the death the previous year of Emperor Hirohito, grandfather of the current emperor.
  - Japanese prime minister Yoshihide Suga on Monday agreed with International Olympic Committee chief Thomas Bach that the Tokyo Olympics will be held as planned next summer, possibly with spectators, despite the ongoing global coronavirus pandemic. Suga and Bach, who is on a four-day visit to Tokyo that began Sunday, said they discussed preparations taking place for the Summer Games and agreed to continue working closely to ensure the safety of visitors as the number of novel coronavirus cases continues to rise across the world.
  - The Japanese government will financially support shops and restaurants that are asked to shorten their business hours in order to curb the spread of the novel coronavirus, Prime Minister Yoshihide Suga said Monday. Suga's pledge came as Hokkaido officials agreed to ask residents of Sapporo in Japan's northernmost main island to refrain from nonessential outings following back-to-back days of record infections in the region. Speaking at a meeting of the government's coronavirus task force, he said the government plans to use 50 billion yen ($480 million) for the support program should local authorities deem it necessary to cut short business hours.
- November 18 – Japan's coronavirus cases rose sharply Wednesday, logging a daily record of 2,203, with Tokyo also reporting a fresh record high in what experts say could be the third wave of the pandemic in the country. Prior to Wednesday, record daily coronavirus cases in Japan were reported for three consecutive days through Saturday, with the figure hitting 1,735 on that day, according to the latest tally. Prime Minister Yoshihide Suga has once again instructed Yasutoshi Nishimura, the minister in charge of the Japanese government's coronavirus response, and health minister Norihisa Tamura to do their utmost to limit the spread of the virus.
- November 19 – A small vessel carrying 62 people, mostly sixth-grade students on a school trip, sank Thursday in the sea off western Japan shortly after all aboard were rescued by Japan Coast Guard ships and nearby fishery boats, the coast guard said. The 19-ton Shrimp of Art was carrying 52 children at the time of the accident, with two of the students and a 72-year-old tour guide taken to the hospital for hypothermia and hyperventilation upon being rescued, according to the Takamatsu Coast Guard Office in Kagawa Prefecture.
- November 21 – Japan will suspend its "Go To Travel" subsidy program in areas with a high number of coronavirus cases, Prime Minister Yoshihide Suga said Saturday, in a policy reversal from his approach already much criticized for focusing too much on stimulating the economy amid record numbers of infections. The decision was made as Japan confirmed more than 2,500 new daily cases of the novel coronavirus, marking a record high for the fourth day in a row, and a day after a government panel of medical experts proposed reviewing the campaign aimed at promoting domestic tourism.
- November 24
  - Japanese prime minister Yoshihide Suga on Wednesday defended his government's decision to continue its economy-boosting travel subsidy campaign, repeating his claim that there is no evidence it caused the nation's recent coronavirus resurgence. His remarks at a budget committee meeting in the House of Representatives came a day after the government said it will exclude Sapporo and Osaka from the subsidy program due to an increase in the number of infections in the two cities.
  - Japan will exclude Sapporo and Osaka from its domestic travel subsidy campaign for three weeks starting Tuesday due to a recent resurgence of coronavirus cases in the two popular tourist destinations, the government said. Yasutoshi Nishimura, the minister in charge of Japan's virus response, said at a news conference that the government will cover cancellation fees for pre-booked trips to the two cities and compensate businesses affected by the suspension.
- November 26
  - Japan's Imperial Household Agency said Friday it has decided to cancel Emperor Naruhito's annual New Year event at the Tokyo Imperial Palace due to a recent spike in the number of new cases of the novel coronavirus. It is the first time the event has been called off since 1990, when the country was mourning the death the previous year of Emperor Hirohito, the grandfather of the current emperor.
  - Tokyo Gov. Yuriko Koike said Wednesday the metropolitan government will request once again that restaurants serving alcohol shorten their operating hours starting this weekend in response to a recent resurgence of coronavirus infections, just two months after lifting its previous request to close early. The Tokyo government will provide 400,000 yen ($3,800) in financial support to businesses in most parts of the metropolis that comply with the request to close by 10 p.m. between Saturday and Dec. 17.
- November 28
  - Tokyo on Saturday kicked off a 20-day period during which restaurants that serve alcohol and karaoke venues have been asked by the metropolitan government to shorten business hours to help combat a recent resurgence in coronavirus infections. The request comes two months after the lifting of a similar call and as the country the same day logged a daily figure of 2,684 new coronavirus cases and 440 cases of those with serious symptoms, both at record levels, further raising concerns about the severity of the virus. The move comes as a blow to operators hoping for increased demand during the year-end party season and could derail the Japanese economy's nascent recovery.
  - A man died and 11 others were injured after a leisure fishing boat capsized following a collision with a cargo vessel at a port in Mito early Saturday morning, the Japan Coast Guard said. All 12 people from the fishing vessel were rescued from the sea but five passengers were taken to hospital, including the 46-year-old man from Tokyo later confirmed dead, according to the coast guard. The seven others, including the captain and a crew, also sustained slight injuries.
- 30 November – Tokyo Stock Exchange President and CEO Koichiro Miyahara resigned on Monday to take responsibility for a system failure in October that caused an unprecedented full-day trading suspension at the bourse. His resignation was announced just after Japan's financial watchdog issued a business improvement order to Tokyo Stock Exchange and its parent company. With the order, the Financial Services Agency added to pressure on the bourse operator and its owner, Japan Exchange Group Inc., to take steps to restore international trust following the Oct. 1 disruption, the worst in the history of the Tokyo market, where about 3 trillion yen ($29 billion) is traded daily.

=== December ===
- December 1 – A giant floating monument of the Olympic rings was reinstalled in Tokyo Bay on Tuesday ahead of the delayed games, having undergone safety inspections and maintenance since August. Illuminations etched against the night sky the shape of the monument measuring 15 meters high, 33 meters long and weighing 69 tons, which had been temporarily removed from the capital's Daiba waterfront area following the games' postponement for a year due to the novel coronavirus pandemic.
- December 3 – The government is closer to a decision to ban sales of new gasoline-only cars in Japan in the mid-2030s, officials said Thursday, as part of efforts to reduce climate change-causing emissions in line with the global trend. The goal, which would promote a shift to all-electric, fuel cell, and gasoline-electric and plug-in hybrid cars, comes as Prime Minister Yoshihide Suga pushes forward with his campaign to make Japan carbon emissions neutral by 2050.
- December 5 – The Japanese government is tackling the latest surge in coronavirus infections with a "strong sense of crisis," Prime Minister Yoshihide Suga said Friday, adding that a rise in the number of severely ill patients has started to put a strain on hospitals. "Protecting the lives and livelihoods of the people is the top priority of my administration," Suga said at a press conference, as he vowed to have a new stimulus package to deal with the fallout of the virus outbreak approved by his Cabinet next week.
- December 6
  - The space probe Hayabusa2 return to the vicinity of Earth on December 6 to drop a capsule containing samples collected from an asteroid that could help explain the origin of life, the Japanese government said Tuesday. The capsule to be released from the Hayabusa2, which was launched on a rocket in December 2014, is expected to land in southern Australia, science minister Koichi Hagiuda told a press conference.
  - The Japanese space agency said Sunday the capsule from its Hayabusa2 space probe was collected from the Australian desert in "perfect condition," hopefully containing samples from the Ryugu asteroid that could help explain the origins of life. The capsule appeared as a bright fireball lasting several dozen seconds as it re-entered Earth's atmosphere before dawn, its protective heat shield glowing as it reached temperatures of approximately 3,000 C.
- December 8 – A small capsule from the Hayabusa2 space probe hopefully containing soil samples from a distant asteroid arrived in Japan on Tuesday for research into the origins of life and the evolution of the Solar System. Two days after being retrieved from the Australian desert, the capsule, carefully stored in a metal container, was transported by truck to the Japan Aerospace Exploration Agency's Sagamihara Campus in Kanagawa Prefecture from Tokyo's Haneda airport, where a chartered plane carrying it touched down early in the morning.
- December 10 – Japan confirmed a record 2,973 daily coronavirus infections on Thursday, further raising concern over the strain on the medical system as the country continued to grapple with a spike in infections. As the nationwide tally hit a record for the second day in a row, a panel of medical experts advising the health ministry on coronavirus response said cases have started to increase in areas that had been free of clusters, including Hiroshima, Kochi and Fukuoka prefectures.
- December 12 – Japan confirmed record daily coronavirus cases of 3,041 on Saturday as the country struggles to cope with a resurgence of infections, with Tokyo and several other prefectures reporting single-day records. Tokyo reported 621 cases of new infections on Saturday, surpassing the previous record of 602 marked on Thursday, while Saitama bordering Tokyo, Kyoto, Nagano, Gifu and Iwate were among other prefectures seeing an all-time high in daily cases.
- December 14
  - The annual Sapporo Snow Festival, one of Japan's biggest winter events held in the northernmost main island of Hokkaido around February, will be canceled for the first time since its inception in 1950 amid a surge in novel coronavirus infections, its organizers said Monday. The festival, which usually features large snow and ice statues in the city center, will instead focus on disseminating online historical information about the event as well as the city's winter charms. The boulevard currently decorated with Christmas lights will be lit up for an extended period of time, according to the organizers.
  - Japanese Defense Minister Nobuo Kishi said Monday he had agreed with Chinese counterpart Wei Fenghe to seek the early establishment of a hotline between their officials amid tensions over the sovereignty of islands in the East China Sea. During their first talks since Kishi took his post in September, he expressed concern about the tension over the Japanese-administered Senkaku Islands, which Beijing claims and calls Diaoyu, a Japanese Defense Ministry official said at a briefing.
- December 16
  - Prime Minister Yoshihide Suga apologized Wednesday after facing mounting criticism for participating in two year-end dinner parties despite the government's warnings to the public to refrain from dining in large groups to prevent spreading the coronavirus. Suga attended two gatherings on Monday night, the first at a luxury hotel with about 15 people including a number of business executives and the second at an upscale steakhouse with senior members of his ruling Liberal Democratic Party and others including Sadaharu Oh, chairman of the Fukuoka SoftBank Hawks baseball team, and actor Ryōtarō Sugi.
- December 18
  - Tokyo reported 664 daily cases of the novel coronavirus on Friday, with its cumulative total topping 50,000, as concern about the strain on Japan's medical system continued to grow. The figures came a day after the capital reported a record 822 daily infections, marking an all-time high for the second day in a row. Its cumulative total now stands at 50,154, with 561 dead.
  - Japan's government upgraded on Friday its economic growth forecast for fiscal 2021 to a record real 4.0 percent, expecting its latest coronavirus stimulus package to boost the economy back to a pre-pandemic level. The Cabinet Office upgraded the projection for the year starting in April from 3.4 percent growth in the previous estimate in July. The Organisation for Economic Co-operation and Development and the International Monetary Fund forecast Japan will expand 2.3 percent in 2021 in an estimate released earlier this month and October, respectively.
- December 19 – Tokyo reported on Saturday 736 cases of novel coronavirus, the second-highest daily increase, bringing the monthly tally, already above the record cases logged last month, to 9,951. Saturday's figure is the largest since the record 822 was confirmed on Thursday. Total cases in December so far have surpassed the 9,857 cases for the full month of November, with the cumulative figure at more than 50,000.
- December 21 – Prime Minister Yoshihide Suga on Monday denied the need to declare another national state of emergency, even as the latest surge of coronavirus cases sent cumulative infections in Japan to over 200,000 and health experts warned that the medical system is becoming strained. Suga said Monday he does not plan to dissolve the House of Representatives for a general election until Japan brings the outbreak of the novel coronavirus under control.
- December 22 – The Tokyo Games organizing committee released its fifth budget on Tuesday, with the total cost of the Olympics and Paralympics increasing to 1.64 trillion yen ($15.8 billion) due to the one-year postponement over the coronavirus pandemic. The budget was raised by 294 billion yen to accommodate expenses related to setting up venues and maintaining the athletes village, including 96 billion yen allocated for countermeasures to prevent the spread of infection at next summer's games.
- December 24 – Japan confirmed about 3,270 coronavirus cases on Wednesday, while confirmed over 3,700 coronavirus cases Thursday, marking the highest daily tally for a second straight day, as Tokyo and several other areas continued to report record numbers of infections amid growing concern over the strain on the medical system.
- December 27 – Japan will suspend new entry into the country of nonresident foreign nationals from around the world from Monday through late January as a precautionary step against the new, potentially more transmissible coronavirus variant, the government said Saturday as it confirmed the first domestically transmitted case. The country reported 3,881 coronavirus cases the same day, a new record daily tally for the fourth straight day, and 47 deaths as Tokyo and several other prefectures reported the highest numbers of infections at the start of the year-end and New Year holidays.
- December 30 – The Tokyo metropolitan government reported 944 cases of the novel coronavirus on Wednesday, marking the second-highest daily tally on record and prompting Gov. Yuriko Koike to warn that the capital is facing "a third wave" of infections of an "unprecedented magnitude." Tokyo had just logged a record 949 infections on Saturday, and saw the seven-day rolling average of new cases top 800 for the first time at 815.7.
- December 31 – The daily number of coronavirus infections totaled 1,337 in Tokyo on Thursday, metropolitan government officials said, exceeding the 1,000 mark for the first time since the pandemic began earlier this year and deepening concerns about hospital capacity. Nationwide, the number of daily cases topped 4,000 for the first time, with record new cases also reported in Fukuoka, Saitama, Chiba, Kanagawa and Gifu prefectures, according to a Kyodo News tally of figures announced by local governments.

== Arts and entertainment ==
- 2020 in anime
- 2020 in Japanese music
- 2020 in Japanese television
- List of 2020 box office number-one films in Japan
- List of Japanese films of 2020

== Sports ==
- 2020 F4 Japanese Championship
- 2020 Super Formula Championship
- 2020 Super Formula Lights
- 2020 Super GT Series
- 2020 in Japanese football
- 2020 J1 League
- 2020 J2 League
- 2020 J3 League
- 2020 Japan Football League
- 2020 Japanese Regional Leagues
- 2020 Japanese Super Cup
- 2020 Emperor's Cup
- 2020 J.League Cup

== Deaths ==
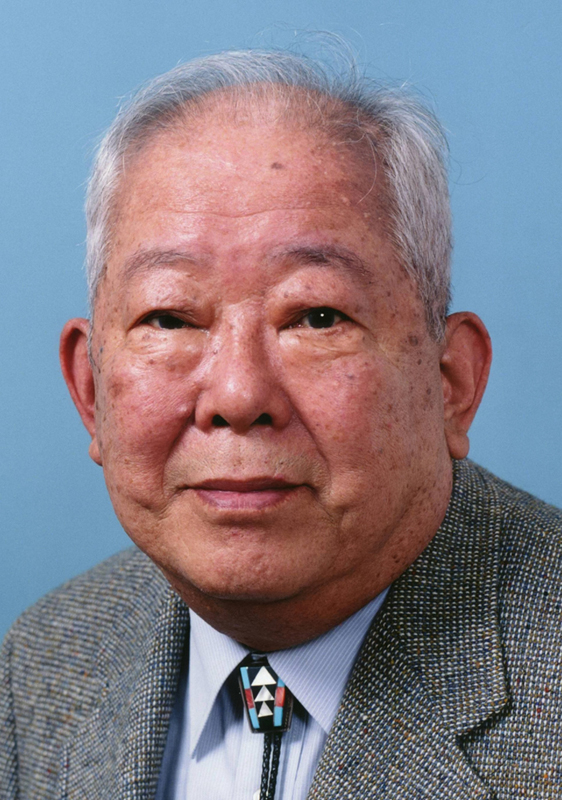
Masatoshi Koshiba, Nobel Prize-winning Japanese physicist, died of natural causes at the age of 94.

In the second year of Reiwa Memoriam despite Japanese demographic and aging crisis in the country, among top 20 famous Japanese people who died peacefully due to illness and old age, including Katsuya Nomura, Mariko Miyagi, Kiyoshi Sasabe, Junzo Sekine, Nobuhiko Obayashi, Takuo Aoyagi, Yuji Adachi, Kansai Yamamoto, Mieko Hirota, Masakazu Konishi, Tetsuya Watari, Yutakayama Hiromitsu, Kyōhei Tsutsumi, Toshinori Kondo, Hiroh Kikai, Sakata Tōjūrō IV, Masatoshi Koshiba, Akito Arima, Minoru Makihara, and Takeo Okada.

Top 5 famous Japanese people who died from COVID-19 infections, including Ken Shimura, Kumiko Owada, Shobushi Kanji, Kenzō Takada, and Yuichiro Hata. While top 5 famous Japanese people who died by suicides, including Hana Kimura, Haruma Miura, Sei Ashina, Takashi Fujiki, and Yūko Takeuchi.

=== January ===
- January 1 – Katsura Shinnosuke, musician (b. 1953)
- January 4 – Junko Hirotani, musician and singer (b. 1956)
- January 11 – Kazuo Sakurada, professional wrestler (b. 1948)
- January 15 – Kotaro Suzumura, economist (b. 1944)
- January 17 – Morimichi Takagi, baseball player and manager (b. 1941)
- January 19 – Shin Kyuk-ho, a.k.a. Takeo Shigemitsu, Japanese-Korean businessman (b. 1921)
- January 20 – Joe Shishido, actor (b. 1933)
- January 21 – Shuchi Kubouchi, chess player (b. 1920)
- January 29 – Michiyo Azusa, singer and actor (b. 1943)
- January 30 – Yoshinaga Fujita, novelist (b. 1950)
- January 31 – Katsumasa Uchida, actor (b. 1944)

=== February ===
- February 11
  - Katsuya Nomura, baseball player and manager (b. 1935)
  - Yasumasa Kanada, mathematician (b. 1949)
- February 13
  - Yoshisada Sakaguchi, voice actor (b. 1939)
  - Ai Kidosaki, TV personality and chef (b. 1925)
- February 21 – Hisashi Katsuta, voice actor (b. 1927)
- February 25 – Kazuhisa Hashimoto, video game developer (b. 1958)
- February 27 – Seiji Kurata, photographer (b. 1945)

=== March ===
- March 8 – Yukimitsu Kano, judoka (b. 1932)
- March 14 – Tamaki Nakanishi, voice actor (b. 1976)
- March 17
  - Tadashi Kato, cyclist (b. 1935)
  - Keiji Ogushi, athlete (b. 1934)
- March 21
  - Mariko Miyagi, actress (b. 1927)
  - Moriyuki Kato, politician (b. 1934)
  - Hiroshi Masuoka, voice actor (b. 1936)
  - Atsushi Ii, voice actor (b. 1939)
- March 26 – Naomi Munakata, Japanese-Brazilian conductor (b. 1955)
- March 29 – Ken Shimura, comedian (b. 1950)
- March 31 – Kiyoshi Sasabe, film director (b. 1958)

=== April ===
- April 2 – Keizo Yamada, athlete (b. 1927)
- April 3
  - Yūtokutaishi Akiyama, engraver and photographer (b. 1935)
  - Yoichi Nishimaru, physician (b. 1927)
- April 9 – Junzo Sekine, baseball player (b. 1927)
- April 10 – Nobuhiko Obayashi, film director (b. 1938)
- April 12 – Keiji Fujiwara, voice actor (b. 1964)
- April 13 – Ryo Kawasaki, musician (b. 1947)
- April 18 – Takuo Aoyagi, engineer (b. 1936)
- April 21 – Shōmei Yokouchi, politician (b. 1942)
- April 23
  - Akira Kume, actor (b. 1924)
  - Kumiko Okae, actress (b. 1956)
  - Namio Harukawa, fendom artist (b. 1947)

=== May ===
- May 13 – Shobushi Kanji, wrestler (b. 1991)
- May 23 – Hana Kimura, wrestler and actress (b. 1997)

=== June ===
- June 5
  - Chizu Saeki, cosmetologist (b. 1943)
  - Keiko Itō, poet (b. 1935)
- June 11
  - Yūko Kagiwada, poet (b. 1932)
  - Katsuhisa Hattori, composer (b. 1936)
- June 16 – Yuji Adachi, musician (b. 1964)

=== July ===
- July 5 — Kōshū Itabashi, chess player (b. 1927)
- July 16 — Azuma Morisaki, film director (b. 1927)
- July 18 — Haruma Miura, actor (b. 1990)
- July 21
  - Kansai Yamamoto, fashion designer (b. 1944)
  - Mieko Hirota, singer (b. 1947)
- July 23 — Masakazu Konishi, archaeologist (b. 1933)

=== August ===
- August 2 — Ryōko Tateishi, actress (b. 1951)
- August 9 — Zaōnishiki Toshimasa (b. 1952)
- August 10 — Tetsuya Watari, actor (b. 1941)
- August 19 — Masakazu Yamazaki, novelist (b. 1934)
- August 23 — Kozo Watanabe (b. 1932)
- August 25 — Itaru Oki, musician (b. 1941)
- August 26 — Masahiro Koishikawa, astronomer and scientist (b. 1952)
- August 28 — Shiro Kishibe, actor (b. 1949)

=== September ===
- September 6 — Takashi Sugimura, biologist (b. 1926)
- September 14 — Sei Ashina, actress (b. 1983)
- September 19 — Yutakayama Hiromitsu, wrestler (b. 1947)
- September 20 – Takashi Fujiki, actor and singer (b. 1940)
- September 26 — Masayoshi Kabe, Japanese-French conductor and musician (b. 1949)
- September 27
  - Yūko Takeuchi, actress (b. 1980)
  - Kōsei Tomita, voice actor (b. 1936)
- September 28 — Hiroki Yuhara, rugby player (b.1984)

=== October ===
- October 4 — Kenzō Takada, fashion designer (b. 1939)
- October 6 — Izumi Matsumoto, manga artist (b. 1958)
- October 7 — Kyōhei Tsutsumi, composer (b. 1940)
- October 17 — Toshinori Kondo, trumpeter (b. 1948)
- October 19 — Hiroh Kikai, photographer (b. 1945)
- October 26 — Masatoshi Abe, politician (b. 1942)

=== November ===
- November 12
  - Sakata Tōjūrō IV, kabuki actor (b. 1931)
  - Masatoshi Koshiba, physician (b. 1924)
- November 13 – Akira Kubodera, actor (b. 1977)
- November 17 – Eitaro Okano, athlete (b. 1930)
- November 23 – Yasumi Kobayashi, author (b. 1962)
- November 27 – Keisuke Kumakiri, photographer (b. 1934)

=== December ===
- December 1 – Mana Kinjo, actress and model (b. 1996)
- December 2 – Kazuo Hiramatsu, scholar (b. 1947)
- December 4 – Kinuko Tanida, volleyball player (b. 1939)
- December 7
  - Akito Arima, nuclear physicist and politician (b. 1930)
  - Masao Komatsu, comedian (b. 1942)
- December 13 – Minoru Makihara, businessman (b. 1930)
- December 17 – Peter Takeo Okada, bishop (b. 1941)
- December 23 – Rei Nakanishi, novelist and songwriter (b. 1938)
- December 27 – Yuichiro Hata, politician (b. 1967)

== See also ==
=== Country overviews ===
- Japan
- History of Japan
- Outline of Japan
- Government of Japan
- Politics of Japan
- Years in Japan
- Timeline of Japanese history

=== Related timelines for current period ===
- 2020
- 2020s
- 2020s in political history
