= List of disasters in Japan by death toll =

This is a list of Japanese disasters by their death toll. Included in the list are disasters both natural and man-made, but it excludes acts of war and epidemics. The disasters occurred in Japan and its territories or involved a significant number of Japanese citizens in a specific event, where the loss of life was 30 or more. Caveats: Events like Hōei_eruption do not have proper death tolls, nobody counted beyond who died from immediate lava flows, the starvation deaths nor those from direct ashfall.

Deaths	Name or description	Type of disaster	Date	Location	Notes
105,385	1923 Great Kantō earthquake	Earthquake and Tsunami	1 Sep 1923	Kantō Plains, Honshu	Deadliest disaster in Japanese history. The Japanese government report in 1927 put the number of victims at 140,000; this was adjusted downwards to 105,385 deaths in 2006.
21,959 (Official)	1896 Sanriku earthquake	Earthquake and Tsunami	15 June 1896	Offshore Tōhoku region, Hawaii	Maximum 38 meters of the tsunami in Iwate Prefecture, and 9 meters reached the Hawaiian coastline
19,759	Tōhoku earthquake and tsunami	Earthquake and Tsunami	11 Mar 2011	72 km east of Oshika Peninsula, Tōhoku	Magnitude 9 earthquake and tsunami reaching 128 feet (39 meters), causing the level-7 nuclear meltdown of the Fukushima Daiichi Nuclear Power Plant. Costliest natural disaster in recorded world history, estimated at up to $235 billion by the World Bank. 19,759 dead, 2,553 missing and 6,242 injured confirmed by the Fire and Disaster Management Agency on 8 March 2022.
19,113 (Official confirmed)	1828 Siebold typhoon	Typhoon and Tidal wave	17 Sep 1828	Northern Kyushu Island	According to official confirmed report, at the time of passing, the estimated central pressure was 935hPa, with a maximum wind speed 198 kilometres (123 mi). A storm surge occurred in the Ariake Sea, and Hakata Bay. The official death toll was 19,113, and injures were 18,625. The heaviest damage occurred at Saga, Omura, Yanagawa, and Fukuoka. This is the worst storm hit in Japanese history.
15,000+	Great Unzen disaster	Eruption, Earthquake, and Tsunami	21 May 1792	Mount Unzen, Kyūshū	A major eruption at Mt Unzen triggered an earthquake, causing Unzen's east flank to collapse, triggering a tsunami in the Ariake Sea.
13,000+	1771 Great Yaeyama Tsunami	Earthquake and Tsunami	24 Apr 1771	Ishigaki Island and Miyako Island	
7,273	Mino–Owari earthquake	Earthquake	28 Oct 1891	Mino Province and Owari Province	
7,000+	Great Ansei earthquake	Earthquake	11 Nov 1855	Tokyo	Also known as the great Edo earthquake.
6,434	Great Hanshin earthquake	Earthquake	17 Jan 1995	Awaji Island, near Kobe	Also known as the Kobe earthquake.
5,098	Typhoon Vera	Typhoon and tidal surge	26 Sep 1959	mainly, Ise Bay, Aichi Prefecture and Mie Prefecture	Also known as the Ise Bay Typhoon.
3,769	1948 Fukui earthquake	Earthquake	28 Jun 1948	Fukui Prefecture	The earthquake occurred on a strike-slip fault that was previously unknown until this event.
3,756	1945 Makurazaki typhoon	Typhoon and tidal surge	17 Sep 1945	mainly, Kyushu Island, Yamaguchi Prefecture, Hiroshima Prefecture, Ehime Prefecture	Also known as the 1945 Typhoon Ida.
3,036	1934 Muroto typhoon	Typhoon and tidal surge	21 Sep 1934	Osaka Bay Area, Kyoto	
3,000+	1933 Sanriku earthquake	Earthquake and Tsunami	2 Mar 1933	Offshore Tōhoku region, Hawaii	Tsunami waves of 2.9 meters (9 ft 6 in) reached the Hawaiian coastline and caused minor damage.
2,925	1927 Kita Tango earthquake	Earthquake	7 Mar 1927	Kyoto Prefecture	
2,306	1945 Mikawa earthquake	Earthquake	13 Jan 1945	Aichi Prefecture	As the earthquake occurred during World War II, information about the disaster was censored, hampering relief efforts and contributing to a high death toll.
2,166	1934 Hakodate fire	City Fire	21 Mar 1934	Hakodate, Hokkaido	One of the worst city fires in Japan.
1,992 (Official Confirmed)	1884 August typhoons	Typhoon and tidal surge	26 Aug 1884	Mainly, Inland Sea area (Okayama Prefecture, Ehime Prefecture and Hiroshima Prefecture),	According to Japanese Government official report, resulting death toll of 1,992, mainly 722 death in Okayama, 345 in Ehime and 131 in Hiroshima.
1,930	1947 Typhoon Kathleen	Typhoon and floods	16 Sep 1947	Around Tone River area (Gunma Prefecture, Saitama Prefecture and Tochigi Prefecture), Tokyo, Ichinoseki	
1,761	1954 Typhoon Marie	Typhoon and city fire	26 Sep 1954	Hakodate, and Iwanai, Hokkaido	Also known as the 1954 Tōyamaru Typhoon, with heavy damage in Tōya Maru, Seikan Maru 11, Hidaka Maru, Tokachi Maru and Kitami Maru, and all of Aomori. The Japan National Railway Hakodate-route Ferry is capsized. It caused the Great Fire in Iwanai.
1,496 (Official confirmed)	1889 August Typhoon	Typhoon, landslide, floods	21 Aug 1889	Kii Peninsula, Nara Prefecture, Wakayama Prefecture	Many rivers flooded in Wakayama Prefecture, which caused many houses to collapse and be lost in many places in Kii Peninsula, with flooding in Kinokawa, Wakayama, In Totsukawa basin, it was continued by a record heavy rain in 19 to 21 August 1889, and large-scale landslides in 1107 places occurred, many river channels were blocked by sediment, causing 53 natural dams. According to Japanese Government confirmed report, 1,496 persons fatalities in disaster area, include 1,221 in Wakayama, 168 in Totsukawa.
1,269	1958 Typhoon Ida	Typhoon and landslide	27 Sep 1958	Izu Peninsula, Shizuoka Prefecture	Also known as the 1958 Kano River Typhoon.
1,151 (Official)	1783 eruption of Mount Asama	Eruption	5 Aug 1783	Nagano Prefecture, Gunma Prefecture	Worst death toll of volcano in Japan
1,121	Mutsu	Shipwreck, Explosion	8 Jun 1943	Hashirajma fleet anchorage, Yamaguchi Prefecture	The battleship sank after accidental magazine explosion
1,086	1943 Tottori earthquake	Earthquake	10 Sep 1943	Tottori prefecture	Although the earthquake occurred during World War II, information about the disaster was not censored.
1,015 (Official)	1953 Wakayama flood	Heavy rain, landslide, and flood	18 Jul 1953	Kii Peninsula, Wakayama Prefecture	Collapse of the dikes occurred in many rivers causing flooding
1,001 (Official)	1953 North Kyushu Flood	Heavy Rain, Landslide and Flood	20 Jun 1953	Kyushu Island, mainly, Kumamoto and Kitakyushu	Outburst and flooding of the dikes occurred in many rivers
992 (Official)	1957 Isahaya flood	Heavy Rain, Landslide and Flood	26 Jul 1957	Nagasaki Prefecture, Kumamoto Prefecture	
943 (Official)	1951 Typhoon Ruth	Heavy Rain, Tidal wave, Landslide and Flood	16 Oct 1951	Kyushu Island, Yamaguchi Prefecture	
941 (Official)	1868 Iruka Lake collapse	Heavy Rain, Embankment collapse	12 May 1868	Inuyama, Aichi Prefecture	Embankment of Lake Iruka collapsed under the influence of heavy rain. This natural disaster was a catastrophe causing 941 deaths and 807 houses washed out.
715 (Official)	1938 Hanshin flood	Heavy Rain, Landslide and Flood	5 Jul 1938	Around Mount Rokkō area, Hyōgo Prefecture	
687 (Official)	1914 Hojo coal mine explosion	Mining explosion	14 Dec 1914	Fukuchi, Fukuoka Prefecture	Worst coal mine and industrial disaster in Japan
672	2024 Noto earthquake	Earthquake and Tsunami	1 Jan 2024	Noto Peninsula, Ishikawa Prefecture	Additional damage was also caused by a 6.58 m (21.6 ft) tsunami. 3 people are still missing, with damage and injuries also occurring in Niigata, Toyama, Fukui, Osaka, Nagano, Hyōgo and Gifu Prefectures.
621 (Official)	Kawachi	Shipwreck, Explosion	12 Jul 1918	Tokuyama Bay, Shunan, Yamaguchi Prefecture	The battleship capsized after a magazine explosion.
567 (Official)	1899 Beshi mine landslide	Landslide, Heavy rain	28 Aug 1889	Niihama, Ehime Prefecture	
520	Japan Airlines Flight 123	Air incident	12 Aug 1985	Mount Takamagahara	Of the 524 people on board, only 4 survived. It is the deadliest single-aircraft accident in history.
477 (Official)	1888 eruption of Mount Bandai	Eruption	15 Jul 1888	Fukushima Prefecture	
464 (Official)	Tarumizu Maru 6	Shipwreck	6 Feb 1944	Kagoshima Bay, Tarumizu, Kagoshima Prefecture	This ship was over-capacity and sank while trying to change direction, throwing off the ship's balance.
458	Miike coal mine explosion	Mine explosion	9 Nov 1963	Miike Coal Mine, Fukuoka Prefecture	
447 (Official)	1972 Japan flood	Heavy rain, Landslide, Floods.	13 Jul 1972	mainly, Amakusa, Kōchi Prefecture and Aichi Prefecture	Landslide in Amakusa, Kyushu Island, Tosayamada, Shikoku Island and many sites
440 (Official)	1807 Eidai bridge collapse by a stampede	Stampede	20 Sep 1807	Edo, (Present day of Tokyo)	In Fukagawa-Tomioka Hachiman shrine, the bridge, dating from 1795, collapsed under the weight of festival-goers, one of the worst panic accidents in Japan. According to an unofficial source report, many more persons went missing.
426	1858 Hietsu earthquake	Earthquake	9 Apr 1858	Gifu Prefecture	
375 (Official)	1936 Osarizawa mine failure	Heavy rain, Dam failure	20 Nov 1936	Kazuno, Akita Prefecture	The incident occurred due to flooding caused by heavy rainfall. Mudflow downriver buried numerous towns. Tenement housing of many of the miners were caught in the mudflow, along with a theater, representative office, and farmers.
322 (Official)	1982 Nagasaki flood	Heavy rain, Landslide	20 Jul 1982	Nagasaki Prefecture, Kumamoto Prefecture	Throughout the Nagasaki area, following rainfall observed at 100 to 187 mm a per hour, as well as landslides throughout the area. According to the Japanese government report, 299 people died in Nagasaki Prefecture, along with 23 in Kumamoto Prefecture
304 (Official)	Sekirei Maru	Shipwreck	20 Dec 1945	Akashi Strait, Hyōgo Prefecture	An Awaji Island to Akashi route boat was overturned by heavy winds. Although fishing boats operating in the vicinity rescued 45 people, the captain of the doomed ship refused to rescue, resulting in the deaths of 304 people.
264	China Airlines Flight 140	Air incident	26 Apr 1994	Nagoya, Japan	Of the 271 people on board, 7 survived.
230	1993 Hokkaidō earthquake	Earthquake and Tsunami	11 Jul 1993	58 km west of Hokkaidō, Sea of Japan	
225	2018 Japan floods	Heavy Rain, Floods, Mudslide	28 Jun 2018 – 9 Jul 2018	Shikoku Western Honshu	Deadliest floods since the 1982 Nagasaki floods, more than 8 million were evacuated across 23 prefectures and 13 people reported missing
208 (Official)	1943 Hoteiza Theatre fire	Fire	6 Mar 1943	Kucchan, Shiribeshi Subprefecture, Hokkaidō	Fire at a consolation film screening during a memorial ceremony.
199	Hakkōda Mountains incident	Mountaineering incident	23 Jan 1902	Hakkōda Mountains	The 199 deaths during a single ascent make it the world's deadliest mountaineering disaster in the modern history of mountain climbing.
191 (Official)	1940 Ajikawaguchi derailment	Train wreck	29 Jan 1940	Ajikawaguchi Station, Osaka	A three-car commuter train derailment, followed by a fire.
184	Hachikō Line derailment	Train wreck	25 Feb 1947	Saitama Prefecture	Cause was excessive speed.
162	Tsurumi rail accident	Train wreck	9 Nov 1963	Tōkaidō Main Line	Cause was track problems.
160	Mikawashima train crash	Train wreck	3 May 1962	Mikawashima Station	Caused by a train missing a danger signal. Involved one freight train and two passenger trains.
155	1918 Mitsumata avalanche	Avalanche	9 Jan 1918	Mitsumata (now Yuzawa), Niigata Prefecture	The worst avalanche accident in Japan
154 (Official confirmed)	1918 Otori mine avalanche	Avalanche	20 Jan 1918	Asahi (now Tsuruoka), Yamagata Prefecture	A heavy snowstorm causing a massive avalanche with 11 buildings collapsed, including the school, worker dormitory, and is the second-largest avalanche accident in Japanese history.
147 (Official)	1945 Futamata tunnel explosion	Explosion	12 Nov 1945	Soeda, Fukuoka Prefecture	A large explosion that happened while the US Army was handling a cache of gunpowder hidden by the Japanese Imperial Army, blowing off the whole depot and a large number of private houses in the mountain area.
144 (Official)	1926 eruption of Mount Tokachi	Eruption	24 May 1926	Central Ishikari Mountains, Hokkaido	
141	Typhoon Ewiniar	Typhoon	29 Jun 2006	Ryūkyū Islands	
133	All Nippon Airways Flight 60	Air incident	4 Feb 1966	Tokyo Bay	No survivors.
129	Tachikawa air disaster	Air incident	18 Jun 1953	Tachikawa	No survivors.
126 (Official)	1956 Yahiko shrine stampede	Stampede	1 Jan 1956	Yahiko, Niigata Prefecture	Second worst stampede disaster in Japan.
124	BOAC Flight 911	Air incident	5 Mar 1966	Mount Fuji	No survivors.
118 (Official)	Sennichi Department Store Building fire	Fire	13 May 1972	Chūō-ku, Osaka	An electrical worker caused the incident by mismanagement of a cigarette or a match.
107	Amagasaki rail crash	Train wreck	25 April 2005	Amagasaki, Hyōgo	Cause was excessive speed on a curve arising from harsh penalties for being late.
106	Sakuragichō train fire	Train wreck	24 April 1951	Sakuragichō Station	Cause was a lack of electrical maintenance, sparking a fire.
105	Typhoon Haikui	Typhoon	1 Aug 2012	Ryūkyū Islands	
104 (Official)	1968 Hida river bus plunge	Road accident	18 Aug 1968	Japan National Route 41, Gero, Gifu Prefecture	Two charter buses en route to Nagoya plunged into the Hida River amid heavy rain and landslides. Worst road accident in Japan and Northeast Asia.
104 (Official)	1973 Taiyo Department Store fire	Fire	29 Nov 1973	Kumamoto, Kyushu Island	
102	I-33	Shipwreck	13 Jun 1944	Iyo Nada, Seto Inland Sea	The submarine sank in a diving accident.
94 (Official)	1939 Hirakata Explosion	Explosion	1 Mar 1939	Hirakata, Osaka Prefecture	The Japanese Imperial Army's ammunition depot caught fire causing large explosions of loaded shells. A total of 29 explosions occurred in the course of a single day, with the fire caused by the explosions lasting until March 3. The explosion sounds echoed between Osaka and Kyoto.
91	I-67	Shipwreck	29 Aug 1940	Off Minamitorishima	The submarine sank in a diving accident. No survivors.
88	Submarine No. 70	Shipwreck	21 Aug 1923	Seto Inland Sea	The submarine sank in a diving accident.
85	I-179	Shipwreck	14 Jul 1943	Seto Inland Sea	The submarine sank in a diving accident. No survivors.
84 (Official)	1924 Otaru Explosion	Explosion	27 Dec 1924	Otaru, Hokkaido	The cargo ship Shoho Maru, carrying about 1,000 boxes of explosives exploded in Otaru on December 27, 1924, after arriving the day before. A fire broke out while the cargo was being unloaded, setting off about 600 boxes and caused a large explosion in Otaru Port.
81	I-63	Shipwreck	2 Feb 1939	Bungo Strait off Kyushu	The submarine sank after colliding with the submarine I-60.
79 (Official)	1970 Osaka Gas Explosion	Explosion	8 Apr 1970	Kita-ku, Osaka	Gas explosion occurred in the construction site of Osaka Municipal Subway.
74	2014 Hiroshima landslides	Landslide	20 Aug 2014	Hiroshima Prefecture	
71	I-61	Shipwreck	2 Oct 1941	Koshiki Channel	The submarine sank after colliding with an Imperial Japanese Navy gunboat.
68	Toa Domestic Airlines Flight 63	Air incident	3 Jul 1971	Yokotsudake	No survivors.
59	Typhoon Bolaven	Typhoon	19 Aug 2012	Ryūkyū Islands	
56	2014 eruption of Mount Ontake	Eruption	27 Sep 2014	Mount Ontake, Honshu	Volcano thought to be dormant.
54	Typhoon Chataan	Typhoon	27 Jun 2002	Guam, Northern Mariana Islands, east coast of Japan	Of the 54 deaths, 6 were in Japan.
50	All Nippon Airways Flight 533	Air incident	13 Nov 1966	Seto Inland Sea	No survivors.
46	Submarine No. 43	Shipwreck	19 Mar 1924	Off Sasebo, Nagasaki Prefecture	The submarine sank after colliding with the light cruiser Tatsuta. No survivors.
44	Myojo 56 building fire	Arson	1 Sep 2001	Kabukicho section of Shinjuku, Tokyo	
41	2018 Hokkaido Eastern Iburi earthquake	Earthquake	6 Sep 2018	Hokkaido, primarily in Atsuma town	
41	Shigaraki train disaster	Train Wreck	14 May 1991	Kōka, Shiga	
40	2004 Chūetsu earthquake	Earthquake	23 Oct 2004	Niigata Prefecture	
36	Kyoto Animation arson attack	Arson	18 Jul 2019	Kyoto	At least 36 people were killed, with 36 others injured and hospitalized. It is reported to be the worst confirmed mass-murder incident in Japan's post-war history and the worst building fire in Japan's history since the Myojo 56 building fire in 2001.
32	Hotel New Japan Fire	Fire	8 Feb 1982	Tokyo	A fire at the Hotel New Japan located in Tokyo's Akasaka District killed 32 and injured at least 60
30	Tsuyama massacre	Spree killing	21 May 1938	Rural village of Kaio in Okayama Prefecture	

== See also ==
- List of deadly earthquakes since 1900
- List of earthquakes in Japan
- List of volcanic eruptions by death toll
- Natural disasters in Japan
