= Kyoto Animation arson attack =

2019 mass murder in Kyoto, Japan

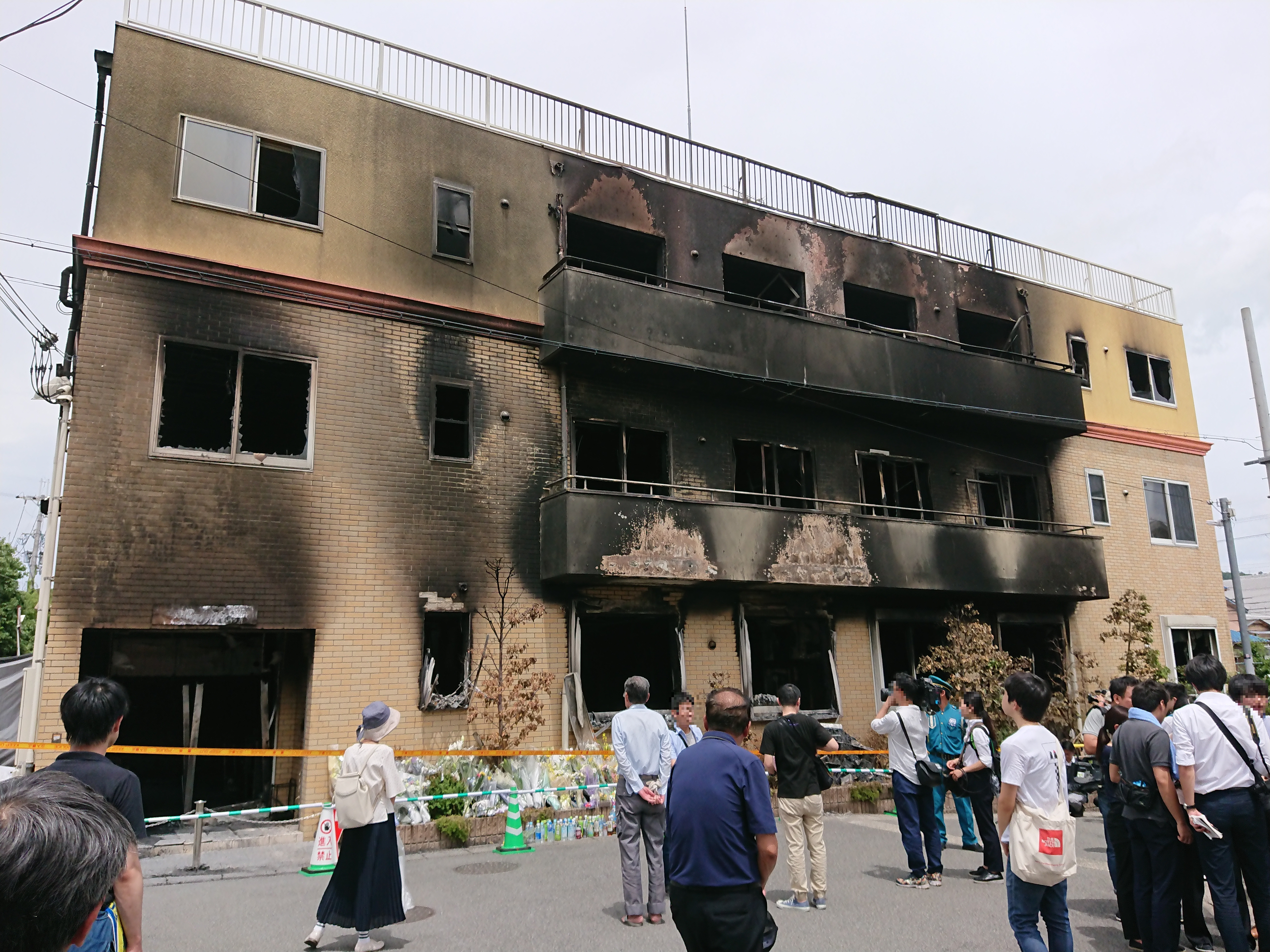
- Kyoto Animation's Studio 1 after the arson attack
- Native name: 京都アニメーション放火殺人事件
- Location: 34°55′59.0″N 135°47′34.6″E; 15–1 Inaba, Momoyama-chō, Fushimi-ku, Kyoto, Japan
- Date: 18 July 2019; 10:31 a.m. JST (UTC+09:00)
- Target: Kyoto Animation Studio 1
- Attack type: Arson; mass murder
- Weapons: Gasoline (40 litres (8.8 imp gal; 11 US gal)), lighter, knives (multiple, unused)
- Deaths: 36
- Injuries: 33 (including the perpetrator)
- Perpetrator: Shinji Aoba (青葉真司)
- Motive: Delusions; retaliation against perceived plagiarism

The Kyoto Animation arson attack (Note: Japanese: 京都アニメーション放火殺人事件, Hepburn: Kyōto Animēshon hōka satsujin jiken; lit. 'Kyoto Animation arson murder incident') occurred at Kyoto Animation's Studio 1 building in the Fushimi ward of Kyoto, Japan, on the morning of 18 July 2019. The arson killed 36 people, injured an additional 33 (including the suspect), and destroyed most of the materials and computers in Studio 1. It is one of the deadliest massacres in Japan since the end of World War II, the deadliest building fire in Japan since the 2001 Myojo 56 building fire, and the first massacre ever to have occurred at a studio associated with an entertainment company, and the animation industry.

The suspect, who did not work for the studio, entered the front door carrying about 40 litres (8.8 imp gal; 11 US gal) of gasoline, then doused the area and several employees before igniting it. After setting himself on fire while lighting the fuel, the suspect attempted to flee, but was apprehended by police about 100 metres (330 ft) from the building. Witnesses stated they heard him accusing the studio of plagiarism. After awaiting his recovery from life-threatening burns for more than ten months, the police arrested 42-year-old Shinji Aoba on suspicion of murder and other offenses on 27 May 2020. He was formally indicted on 16 December 2020. Aoba eventually pled guilty to the charges on 5 September 2023, and was sentenced to death on 25 January 2024.

In addition to condolences and messages of support from national and international leaders, fans and businesses raised over ¥3.3 billion (equivalent to ¥3.58 billion or US$23.64 million in 2024) in Japan and over US$2.3 million internationally to help the studio and its employees recover. A special measure was passed by the National Diet to allow for donations to the studio to be tax-exempt. As a result of the incident, some works and collaborations by the studio were delayed, and several events were suspended or cancelled.

== Background ==
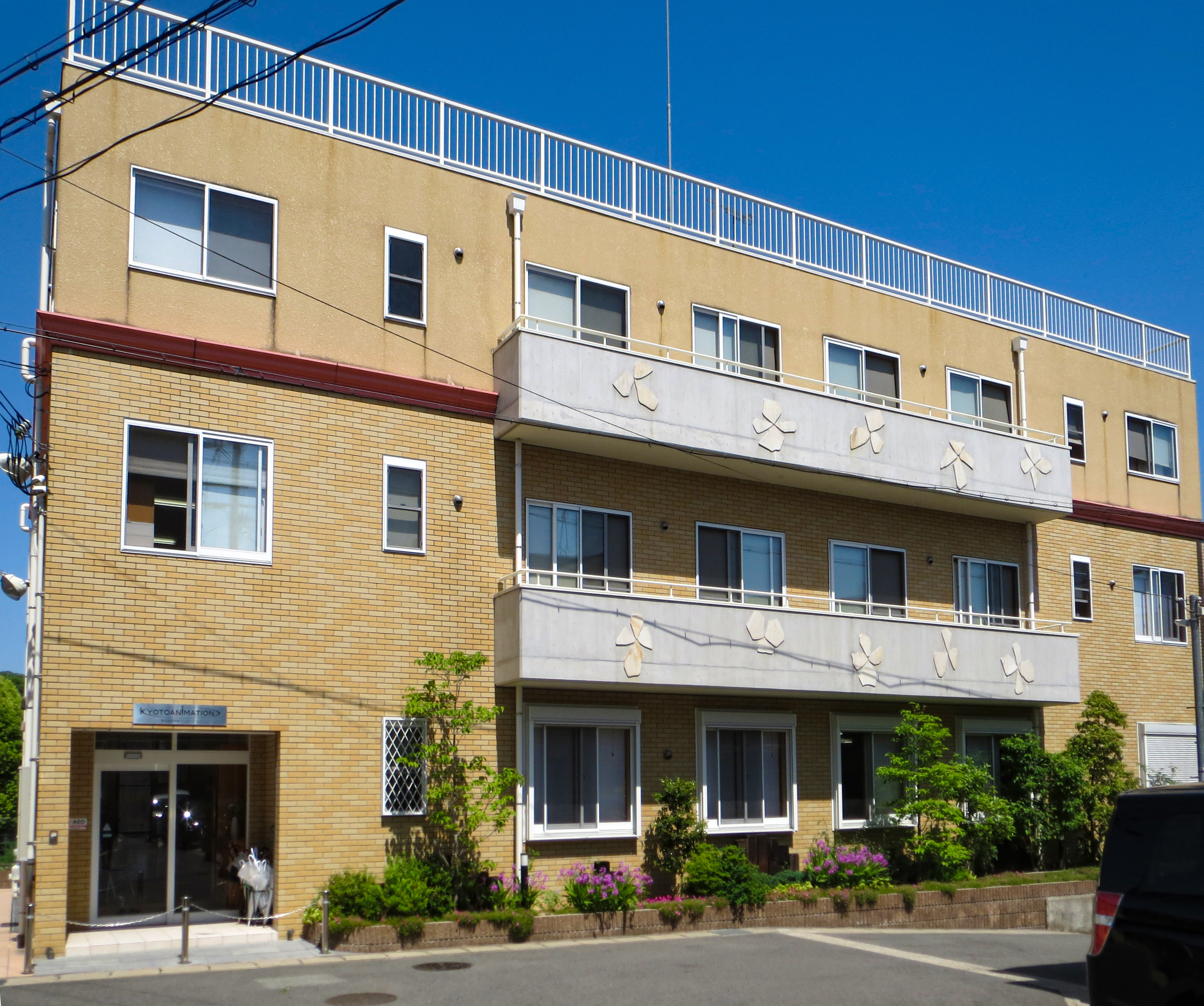
Studio 1 prior to the arson attack, May 2015

Kyoto Animation is one of Japan's most acclaimed anime studios, known for titles such as The Melancholy of Haruhi Suzumiya, K-On!, Clannad, and Nichijou. It has several different locations in Kyoto: Studio 1 (in Fushimi ward); Studio 2 (the head office), and Studio 5. Their merchandise development division is in Uji, one train station away from Studio 1. The building was used mainly by the animation production staff, and was constructed in 2007.

In the year leading up to the attack, Kyoto Animation had received over 200 death threats. Company president Hideaki Hatta said they did not know if the threats were related to the incident, as they were sent anonymously, but he had informed police and lawyers of them. After the National Police Agency was informed of these threats in October 2018, officers temporarily patrolled the head office at the time.

== Incident ==
The fire began with an explosion at around 10:31 a.m. (01:31 UTC) when the perpetrator walked into Studio 1 and set the building on fire with 40 litres (8.8 imp gal; 11 US gal) of gasoline. The perpetrator bought the gasoline 10 km (6.2 mi) away from the building, and it was believed that he walked to the building with the gasoline being carried on a platform trolley. The police believed that the gasoline dispersed on site mixed with the air, causing the explosion at the start. The perpetrator is reported to have been shouting "Die!" as he carried out the attack. He also poured gasoline over some individuals before setting them alight—setting himself on fire in the process—causing them to run out into the street in flames.

As the fire grew by the entrance, staff members were trapped inside the building. Twenty bodies were found on the stairs from the third floor to the roof, evidently indicating that the victims were attempting to escape. Tomoaki Nishino, associate professor at Disaster Prevention Research Institute of Kyoto University, estimated that the second and third floors were almost filled with smoke within 30 seconds of the explosion. The perpetrator fled the scene but was chased by two Kyoto Animation employees and soon collapsed on the street, where he was apprehended by police. Multiple unused knives were found lying by the scene.

The fire was under control at 3:19 p.m. (06:19 UTC), and extinguished at 6:20 a.m. on the next day (21:20 UTC). Once the rescue efforts had ended, it was confirmed that all people in the studio had been accounted for. The building did not have fire sprinklers or indoor fire hydrants due to its classification as a small office building, but had no deficiencies in fire safety compliance during its last inspection on 17 October 2018. Initial reports claimed the studio's entrance required employee pass-cards, but the door was left unlocked as the studio was expecting visitors. However, this was inaccurate: there was no security system in place and the door was always left unlocked during business hours.

The arson attack destroyed most of Kyoto Animation's materials and computers in Studio 1, though a small portion of keyframes were on exhibition in Tokushima and hence spared destruction. On 29 July, Kyoto Animation reported that it successfully recovered some digitized original drawings from a server that survived the fire.

The attack is reported to be one of the deadliest massacres in Japan's history since the end of World War II and the deadliest building fire in the country since the Myojo 56 building fire in 2001. It was considered "suicidal terrorism" by one criminology professor at Rissho University, as the attack was reportedly intended to be a suicide mission by the suspect.

== Victims ==
Seventy people were inside Studio 1 at the time of the fire. Initially it was reported that 34 people had been killed before two more later died at a hospital. (Note: Many sources reported on the number of victims.) Some victims were difficult to identify, according to the Kyoto police, because they had been burned beyond recognition. Autopsy results released on 22 July 2019 revealed that a majority of victims had succumbed to burns (rather than carbon monoxide poisoning) due to the quick-spreading fire. DNA testing was done to aid in identifications, which lasted up to a week after the attack. It was reported that two-thirds of the victims (at least 20) were women, as the studio was known for hiring female animators. The president of Kyoto Animation asked the media through the police not to release the names of the victims out of respect for their families, stating that "releasing their names does nothing to serve the public good." On 25 July, Kyoto police said they had identified all 34 victims and had started to return the bodies of the victims to their relatives.

Meanwhile, discussions were ongoing with Kyoto Animation on if, when, and how to reveal the identities of the deceased. Some of the families released their own findings early to the media regarding the status of their loved ones. The family of color designer Naomi Ishida confirmed her death on 24 July. Animator, scriptwriter, and director Yasuhiro Takemoto was confirmed dead by his family through DNA testing on 26 July. The first post-fire death occurred on 27 July which brought the number of deceased to 35. On 2 August, Kyoto police released the names of ten victims (including the people already mentioned) whose funerals had finished and relatives' consents obtained, and it was confirmed on the same day that animation directors Yoshiji Kigami and Futoshi Nishiya were among the dead. The remaining 25 victims were officially revealed on 27 August as the social impact of the case became a factor. On 4 October 2019, it was announced that one woman died from septic shock, bringing the death toll to 36. (Note: Reports on the number and identity of the injured and dead from many sources.)

It was initially reported that 36 people were injured, but this figure dropped to 34 after two people later died at the hospital. By 18 September it was reported that all thirty-four (34) people injured in the attack were no longer in life-threatening condition. Some still remained in the intensive care unit (ICU) with severe burns. According to the South Korean Ministry of Foreign Affairs, one of the injured victims was a South Korean woman. Those who were reported safe include animation director Naoko Yamada, who directed K-On!, A Silent Voice and Liz and the Blue Bird.

== Perpetrator ==
Shinji Aoba
- Born: 16 May 1978 (age 48); Urawa, Saitama, Japan
- Occupation: Unemployed
- Status: Incarcerated, awaiting execution
- Motive: Revenge tied to imagined plagiarism; mental illness
- Convictions: Murder (36 counts); Attempted murder (33 counts); Arson; Trespassing
- Penalty: Death by hanging

Details
- Imprisoned at: Osaka Detention House

Shinji Aoba (青葉 真司, Aoba Shinji) was identified as the suspect by police. He was born on 16 May 1978, in Urawa, Saitama, Japan. He was 41 years old at the time of the attack.

Investigators said Aoba is a high school graduate who attended evening school. They also said he worked part-time at the Saitama prefectural government for three years until 1998. His father died when he was 21 years old. After that he lost contact with his siblings, and it is believed he lived alone. Aoba went from job to job, and was later involved in a robbery. He was admitted to a rehabilitation facility for offenders in Saitama City in 2016, when he was 38. Aoba was in the facility for six months. After that, he is believed to have lived alone in an apartment in Saitama City for about three years. He reportedly resided there until the attack on the animation studio. The resident of the apartment next door says Aoba banged on his door four days before the arson attack and blamed him for noise that was coming from a different unit. Although the resident tried to explain that he was not making the noise, he said Aoba suddenly grabbed him by the collar. He said he found it impossible to communicate with the defendant. Police say Aoba traveled to Kyoto three days before the incident and visited the site of the animation studio building before buying items for the attack.

According to locals, a man resembling Aoba was spotted near Studio 1 in the days before the incident. He was also reported to have visited several places of interest related to Sound! Euphonium around the city in days prior to the attack.

Immediately following the attack, Aoba fled the scene, chased by employees of the studio, but was apprehended by the Kyoto Prefectural Police near Rokujizō Station of Keihan Electric Railway, about 100 metres (330 ft) from the studio; Aoba was then taken to a hospital with severe burns to the legs, chest, and face.

During his transport to the hospital, Aoba admitted to having started the fire, for revenge, accusing the studio of "ripping off" or "plagiarising" his novels. (Note: Plagiarism reports from many sources.) Initially, company president Hideaki Hatta had stated that there was no record of anyone submitting work to their annual writing contest under Aoba's name. Subsequently, Kyoto Animation revealed that they had received a draft novel from Aoba; however, it did not pass the first-stage assessment and was forgotten, and its contents were confirmed to have no meaningful similarities to any of their published works.

Scenes from Kyoto Animation works that Aoba claims were plagiarized
	Free!	Tsurune	K-On!
KyoAni works	A school banner reading "Swimming club advances to regional tournament" is blown in the wind, and a banner for the judo club can be seen below.	When a character puts meat in their shopping cart, another character finds meat at a 20% discount.	A character says to a junior, "I repeated a grade."
Aoba's novel	There are scenes where banners appear.	There is a scene where the heroine buys deli dishes at a 50% discount.	There is a scene in which a high school boy is told by his teacher, "If you continue like this, you'll repeat the grade."

Due to serious burns sustained during the incident, Aoba was transferred to a university hospital in Osaka for further treatment, where he received necessary skin grafts. On 5 September 2019, it was reported that his injuries were no longer considered life-threatening, but he was still being treated in an ICU and required respiratory assistance from a ventilator. Aoba regained speech on 18 September and began rehabilitation by 8 October, being able to sit up on a wheelchair and hold short conversations. The police obtained a warrant for his arrest, but were required to await confirmation from doctors that Aoba could withstand confinement.

On 14 November 2019, he was moved to another hospital in Kyoto for final rehabilitation. He recovered from most of his injuries and acknowledged responsibility for the attack. He expressed feelings of remorse and gratitude towards the hospital staff, who he said treated him better than anyone had ever done in his life. On the other hand, he told police that he lit the fire because Kyoto Animation had stolen his novel, and that he expected to get the death penalty.

Most of Aoba's burned skin was replaced with experimental artificial skin, as the victims were prioritized to receive donor human skin first. This was the first use of artificial skin on significant burns in Japan.

By January 2020, Aoba remained hospitalized, and was unable to stand or eat unassisted. On 27 May, Aoba was judged to have sufficiently recovered from his burn injuries, and he was formally arrested on suspicion of murder and other charges. He was indicted on 16 December 2020 on murder and other charges.

Aoba had a prior criminal history and was known to suffer from mental illness. In 2012, he robbed a convenience store with a knife in Ibaraki Prefecture and was subsequently jailed for three-and-a-half years. It was speculated after the attack that Aoba's mental illness would reduce his maximum penalty for the attack from a death sentence to life imprisonment.

On 12 May 2023, the Kyoto District Court announced that Aoba would stand trial in September 2023 and that a verdict would be announced in January 2024. Aoba pleaded guilty to the charges on 5 September 2023, and on 7 December the prosecutors announced they would be seeking the death penalty for Aoba. On 25 January 2024, the court announced that Aoba had been sentenced to death. The day after, Aoba filed an appeal against the death sentence. Aoba told a local press that he "accepted the death sentence", but he went ahead with the appeal as he wanted to "speak out".

On 28 January 2025, Aoba's death sentence was finalized after he withdrew his appeal to the Kyoto District Court's ruling. On 17 March 2026, the Osaka High Court ruled that Aoba's withdrawal of his appeal was valid.

== Aftermath ==
One month after the arson attack, the victims began to return to work at the other Kyoto Animation studio. As of October 2019, while the number of Kyoto Animation employees decreased from 176 to 137, 27 of the surviving 33 victims returned to work, with several having decided to take extended breaks to cope with the stress and anxiety brought by the attack.

The company issued an official statement, requesting respect for the victims and their family members, and also stating that all future statements will be either through the police or their lawyers. The demolition process of the building was completed on 28 April 2020, with no further plans for the site revealed. In an earlier interview, Kyoto Animation's president Hideaki Hatta stated that he was considering replacing the building with a green public park and a memorial monument. However, residents in the neighbourhood did not wish for a memorial to be built, claiming visitors paying their respects would "destroy the peaceful lifestyle [of local residents]".

Due to recovery efforts, Kyoto Animation suspended the 11th Kyoto Animation Awards, an annual award to discover new stories.

In November 2019, the studio decided to continue training programmes for aspiring animators, in which trainees would be trained in movies, sketching and animations. Upon graduating from the programme, outstanding trainees could be recruited by the studio after being examined further.

=== Impact on productions ===
In response to the attack, a publicity event for the 2020 film Free! was cancelled. Kyoto Animation's Sound! Euphonium collaboration with Keihan Main Line was delayed, as was episode 4 of BEM. The third episode of David Production's Fire Force, an anime series about firefighters and people dying from spontaneous combustion, was delayed for a week and released with the colours of the fires and narration modified. Subsequent episodes of Fire Force were dealt with in a similar manner. The studio decided to push on with premiering Violet Evergarden: Eternity and the Auto Memory Doll on 3 August 2019 at Germany's AnimagiC convention as originally scheduled. The Japanese theatrical screening dates were extended by an extra week and honored the victims in the end credits. Despite earlier news reports stating that the upcoming Violet Evergarden film would premiere as scheduled on 10 January 2020. It was later announced to be delayed to 24 April 2020, but as a result of the COVID-19 pandemic, the premiere was again delayed to 18 September 2020. An episode for Animation x Paralympic, originally due to be aired in August 2019, was eventually announced as cancelled on 28 February 2020, citing that they would be unable to complete it in time for the 2020 Paralympics; this was later reversed, and it was instead pushed back by a year.

=== Measures to prevent recurrence ===
The Fire and Disaster Management Agency and the National Police Agency issued a notice on 25 July 2019, requiring gas stations to maintain sales records of people purchasing gasoline in refillable containers, which conform to fire safety regulations. Each record is to contain the buyer's personal information such as name, address, the purpose of the purchase, and quantity purchased. Although the notice had no legal backing, most buyers complied with this additional requirement voluntarily. This measure was formalised with the relevant regulations revised and coming into force on 1 February 2020 to make the sales records mandatory. After the incident, the Kyoto Municipal Fire Department formulated guidelines for evacuation in the event of arson or terrorism and encouraged the installation of evacuation ladders.

As a result of the attack, police in Japan became more vigilant with death threats directed at other companies, such as Khara, Square Enix, Animate, and Clannad developer company Key, who each later received threats referencing the Kyoto Animation attack.

=== Memorial ===
A tribute video was published, one year after the attack, on 18 July 2020. The company had considered holding a memorial ceremony, but in light of the COVID-19 pandemic in Japan, decided against it. Similarly, at 10:30 am JST on 18 July 2021, Kyoto Animation's YouTube channel streamed a 13-minute video to "provide a place for everyone to share their thoughts and feelings". In the video were messages and tributes from the studio, from staff members, and from the families of some of the deceased. The company requested that fans not visit the former site of Studio 1 on the anniversary of the incident to respect the wishes of local residents.

The memorial monument erected in the Tea and Uji Town Historical Park (near Keihan Uji Station) in Uji City under the name "Monument Connecting Will." It was unveiled on 14 July 2024, and is designed with 36 birds flapping their wings, symbolizing the 36 victims.

== Reactions ==
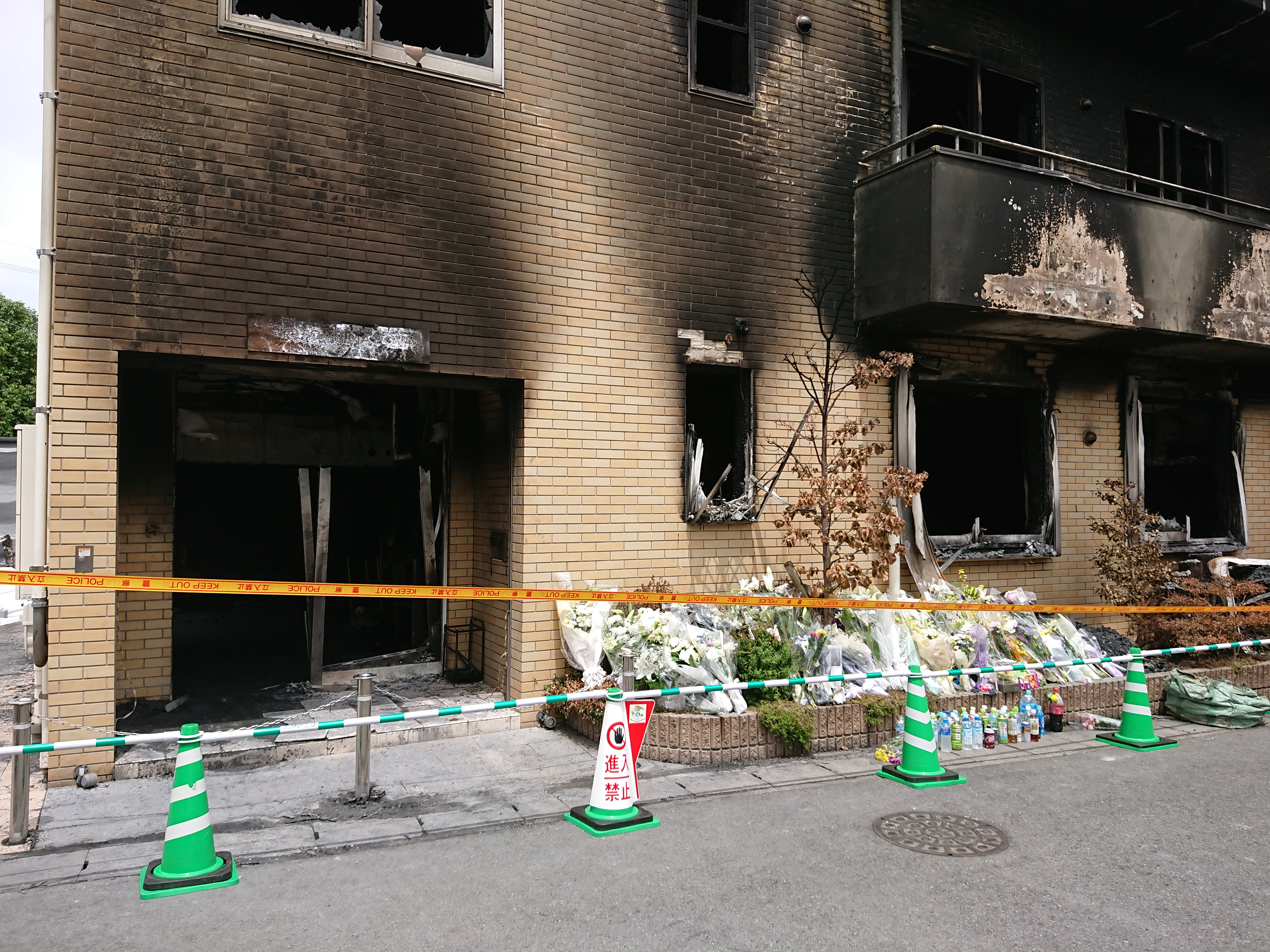
The entrance to the studio after the arson attack. Bouquets and beverages are placed in memorial.

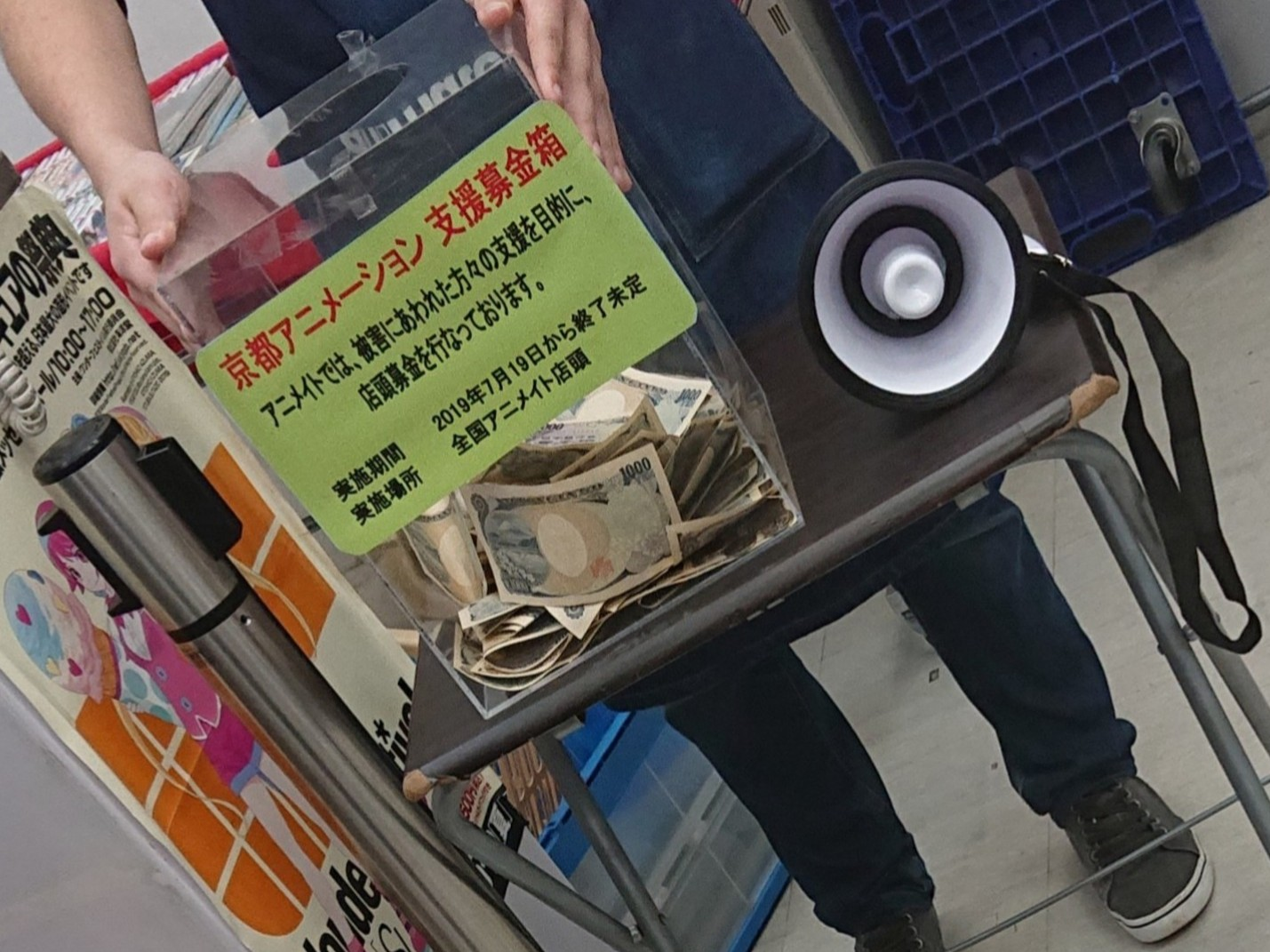
Donation box at Animate Akihabara

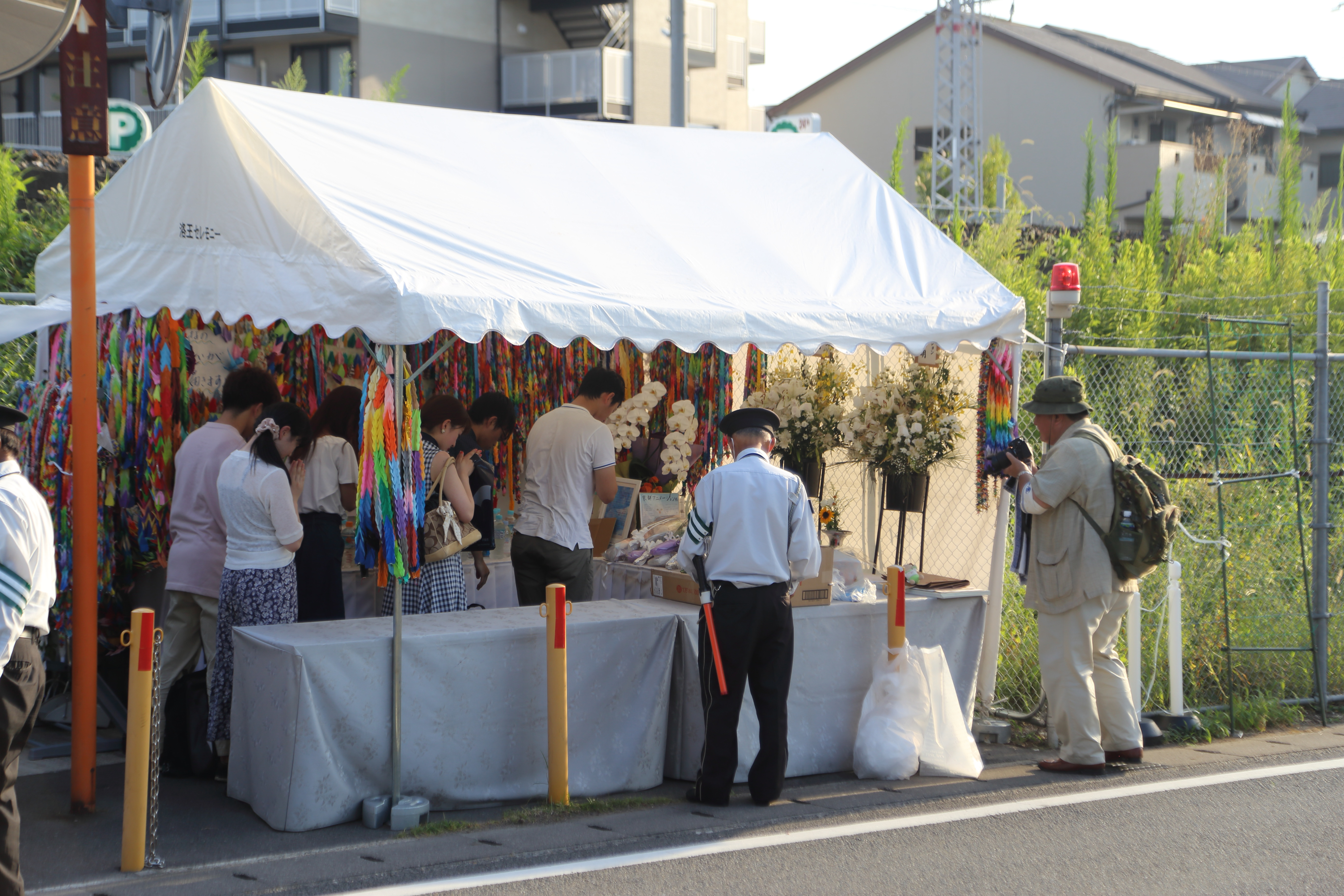
A memorial with flowers beside a field near Rokujizō Station

Kyoto Animation accepted direct donations through a local bank account to help the victims of the attack from 23 July 2019 to 27 December 2019. Eventually, the bank account had accumulated approximately ¥3.3 billion (equivalent to ¥3.58 billion or US$23.64 million in 2024). The donations included separate ¥10 (equivalent to ¥10.84 in 2024) million donations from the Japanese musician Yoshiki and game developer Key. It was estimated that the company would require as much as ¥10 (equivalent to ¥10.84 in 2024) billion to cover the cost of supporting the victims and affected families and company-related business operating recovery expenses. As of November 2019, the company has begun the process of distributing the funds raised to the victims, with each victim receiving an appropriate amount after factoring various considerations such as severity of injuries, whether the victim is a sole breadwinner, etc.

=== Domestic ===
Prime Minister Shinzo Abe expressed his condolences and stated that he was "speechless" at the scale of the incident. (Note: Condolences and support were expressed by many.) A first in Japanese corporate history, a measure was passed in the National Diet to allow for donations to the studio to be tax-exempt. The Chinese, French, Philippine, and Belgian embassies in Japan provided their own words of condolences.

Numerous people and organizations related to the industry expressed concern and support, such as anime directors Makoto Shinkai and Tatsuki [ja], K-On! voice actress Aki Toyosaki, The Melancholy of Haruhi Suzumiya voice actresses Aya Hirano, Minori Chihara, and Yūko Gotō, Hyōka author Honobu Yonezawa, Clannad developer company Key, and media company Kadokawa Corporation. Animation studios such as Shaft, Sunrise, Bandai Namco Pictures, Toei Animation, Bones, Khara, Trigger, Disney Japan, and Madhouse all offered their support as well.

Animate, a major Japanese retailer of anime, video games, and manga, took donations at all of their stores to support the victims, and had raised over ¥330 (equivalent to ¥357.84 in 2024) million by 1 September.

=== International ===
Several foreign dignitaries, including Tsai Ing-wen, António Guterres, and others, offered their own messages of support for the victims.

In the wake of the fire, a GoFundMe appeal was launched by American anime licensor Sentai Filmworks. With a target of US$750,000, it surpassed the US$1 million donation mark within the first 24 hours. It had received US$2.3 million at the end of the appeal. As of 7 December 2019, Sentai had transferred all of the funds raised, except for credit card processing fees, to Kyoto Animation studio.

Fans have also taken to Kyoto Animation's Japanese digital store to directly contribute by purchasing high-resolution downloadable images as they do not require staff to ship them. American licensing companies Aniplex of America, Funimation and Crunchyroll, and Nickelodeon Animation Studio all offered their support. Adult Swim's anime-oriented Toonami block started their 20 July broadcast asking viewers to donate to the GoFundMe set up by Sentai Filmworks.

== See also ==
- 2019 in Japan
- 2021 Osaka building fire
- Crime in Japan
- List of building or structure fires
- List of disasters in Japan by death toll
- Sennichi Department Store Building fire
- List of massacres in Japan
