= Hakodate Dock Red Brick Warehouses =

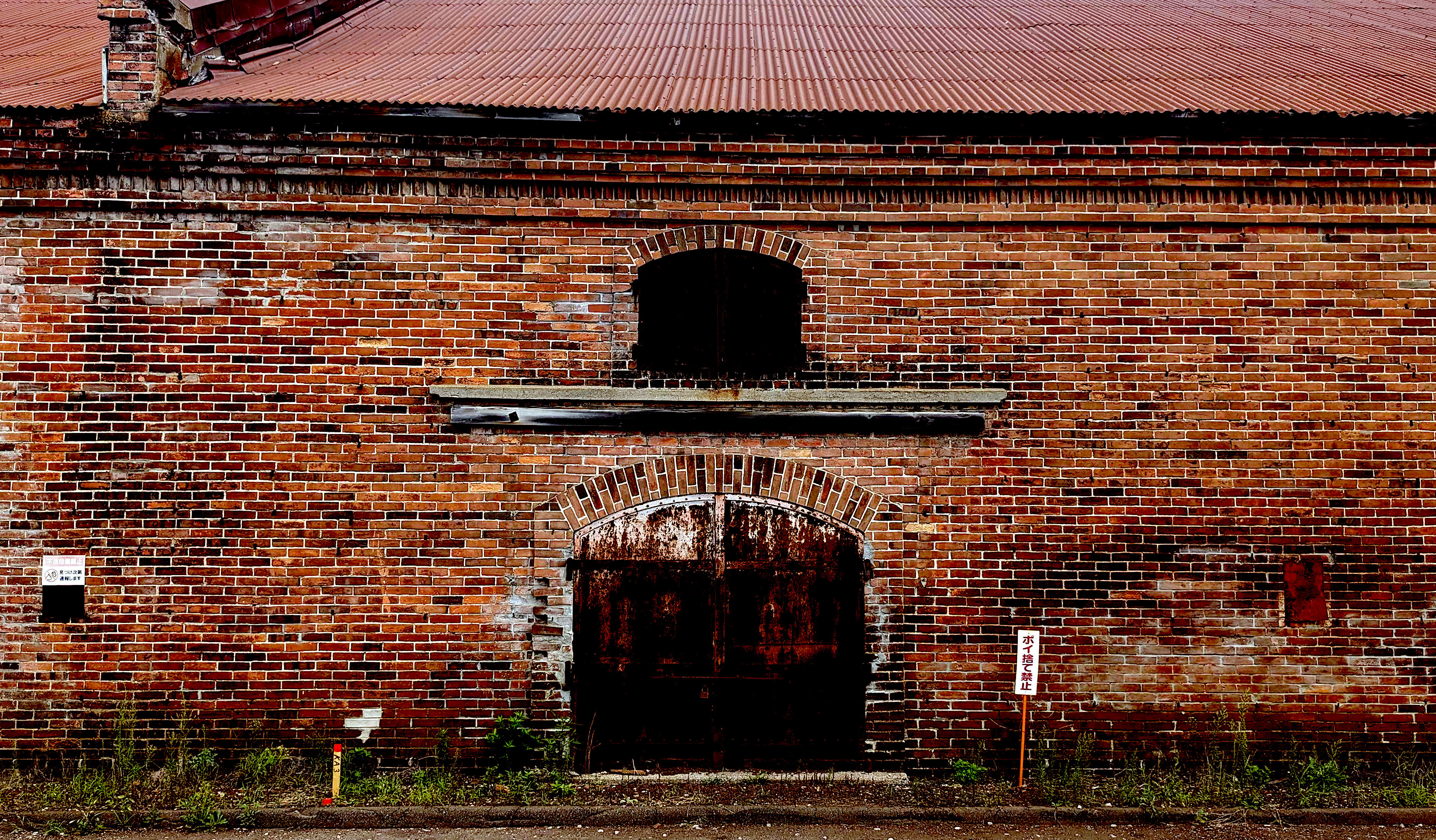
- Interactive map of the Hakodate Dock Red Brick Warehouses area

General information
- Location: Bentenchō 20, Hakodate, Hokkaido, Japan
- Coordinates: 41.7741°N 140.7048°E
- Completed: 1901
- Owner: Hakodate Dock Co. Ltd.

The Hakodate Dock Red Brick Warehouses (函館どつくレンガ倉庫, Hakodate Dotsuku Renga Sōko) are a group of historic red brick warehouses located in Benten-chō, Hakodate, Hokkaido, Japan. Originally named the Yanagida Warehouses (柳田倉庫, Yanagida Sōko), and later to become the Benten Warehouses (弁天倉庫, Benten Sōko), they were ultimately acquired by Hakodate Dock as part of the company's wartime expansion, at which point they received their current name "Hakodate Dock Red Brick Warehouses". The warehouses were constructed in 1901 during the Meiji period, eight years before Hakodate's famous Kanemori Red Brick Warehouses. They are among the oldest surviving red brick warehouse buildings in the city. Measuring over 100 meters in length, they are also the largest red brick warehouses in Hakodate.

In August 2025, news outlets reported on Hakodate Dock's plans to demolish approximately half of the warehouses in October 2025 to construct a dormitory for ship repair crews.

== Overview ==
The Hakodate Dock Red Brick Warehouses were constructed in 1901 and initially known as the Yanagida Warehouses after their creator, Yanagida Tōkichi, a businessman and politician from Morioka who acquired the land for the warehouses in 1899. They survived the Great Hakodate Fire of 1907 and remain as valuable industrial heritage from the Meiji period.

A distinctive architectural feature is the use of a stretcher bond (長手積み, nagate-zumi) brick laying technique, which differs from the English bond (イギリス積み, Igirisu-zumi) used in Hakodate's famous Kanemori Red Brick Warehouses. This technique involves placing only the long faces of bricks on the exterior surface, demonstrating the diversity of construction methods used during the Meiji period.

== Current status ==
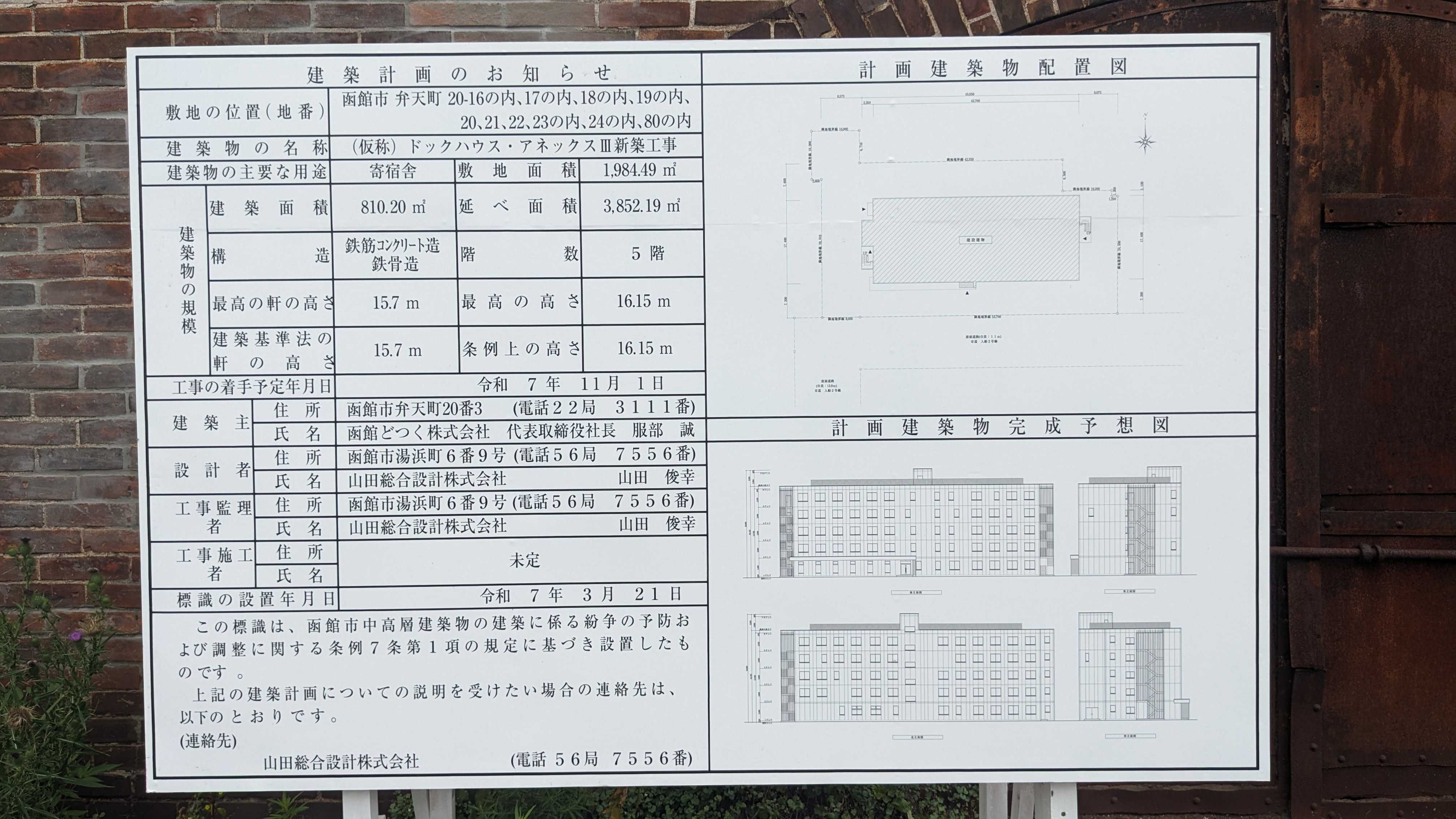
Notice announcing plans for the Hakodate Dock Red Brick Warehouses site (dated March 21, 2025). Construction of a 5-story dormitory is planned, with work scheduled to begin on November 1, 2025.

As of 2025, the Hakodate Dock Red Brick Warehouses still exist in Benten-cho, Hakodate City, and are owned by Hakodate Dock Co., Ltd. Hakodate Dock is Hokkaido's largest shipbuilding company, and the warehouses have been maintained to the present day in close connection with the company's business activities.

While not as popular among tourists as the well-known Kanemori Red Brick Warehouses, the Hakodate Dock warehouses are an essential part of Hakodate's industrial heritage. Nonetheless, on March 21, 2025, Hakodate Dock posted plans to demolish approximately half of the warehouses and construct a 5-story dormitory on the site. The demolition is scheduled to begin in October 2025, with construction of the new facility, which will have a total floor area of 3,852.19 square meters and house approximately 290 ship repair crew members, scheduled to begin on November 1, 2025. The plans have raised concerns about the loss of this precious industrial heritage that has survived since the Meiji period.

Vocalist Teru of the rock band Glay posted to social media about the demolition plans in July 2025, attracting attention among fans. In response to the demolition plans, local volunteers organized the "Hakodate Dock Brick Warehouses Photo Exhibition by Kino Koike," which was held from September 3 to 15, 2025, to document the warehouses before their demolition.

== Gallery ==
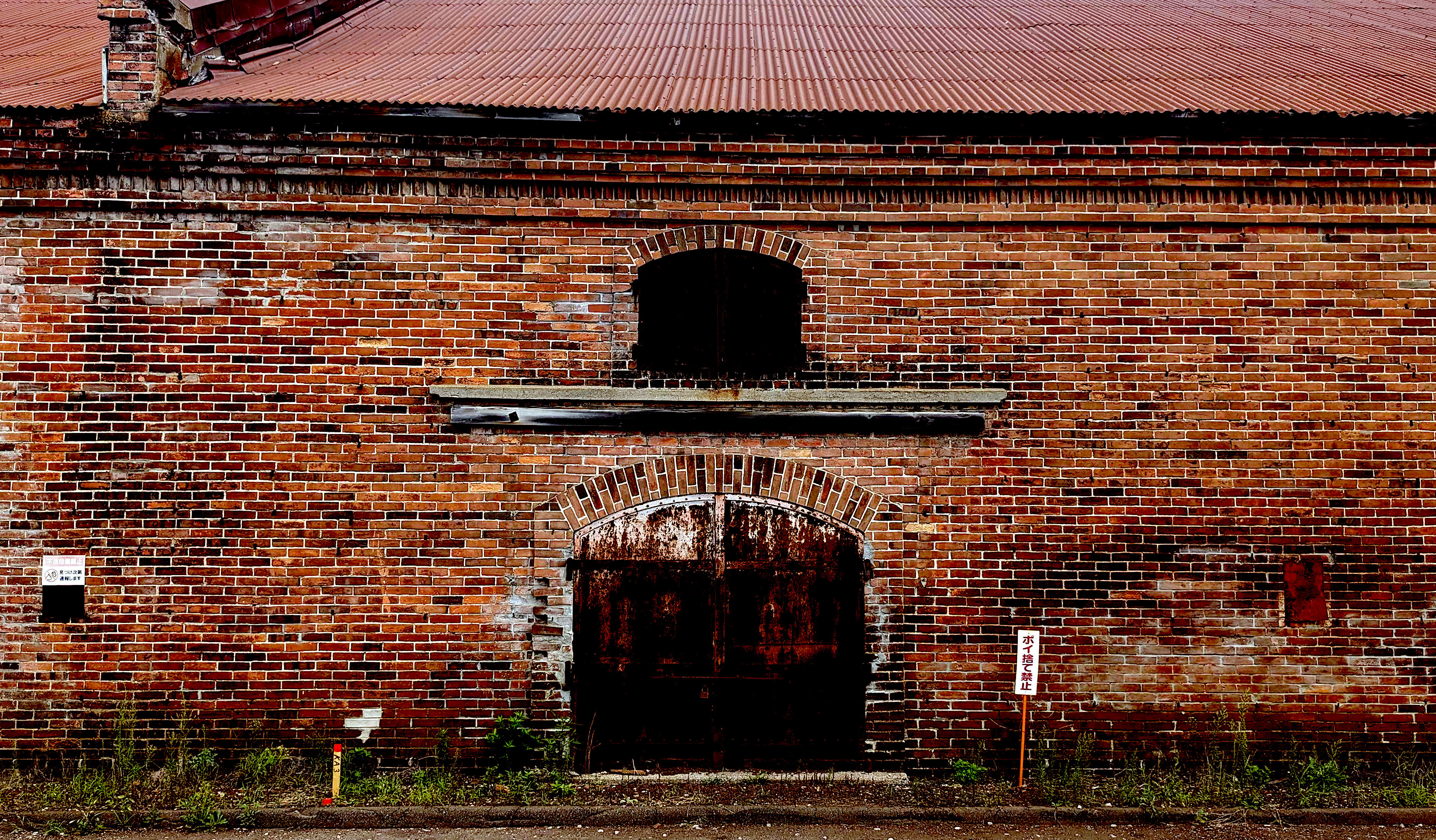
Red Brick Arch Doorway

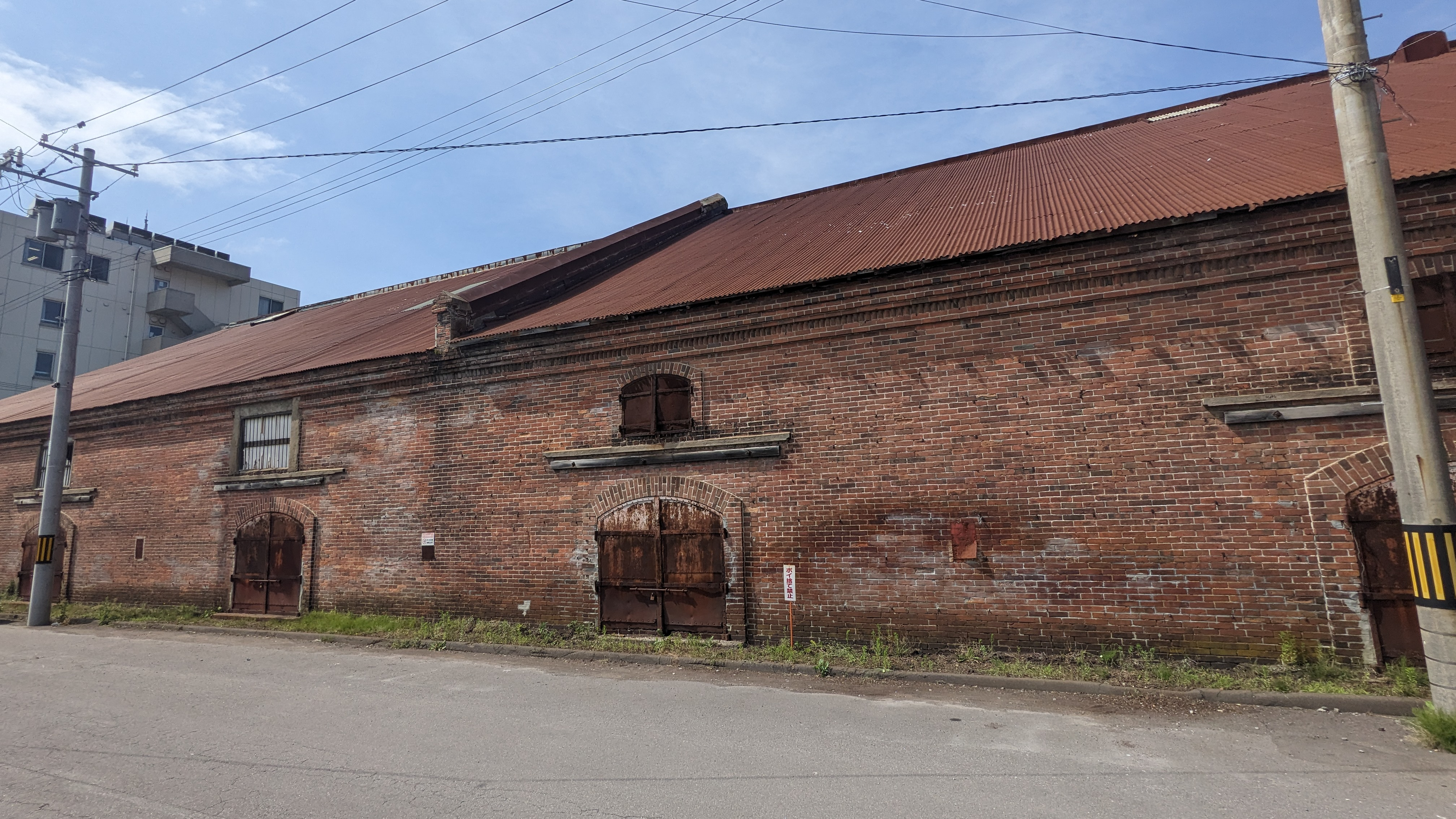
Hakodate Dock Red Brick Warehouses

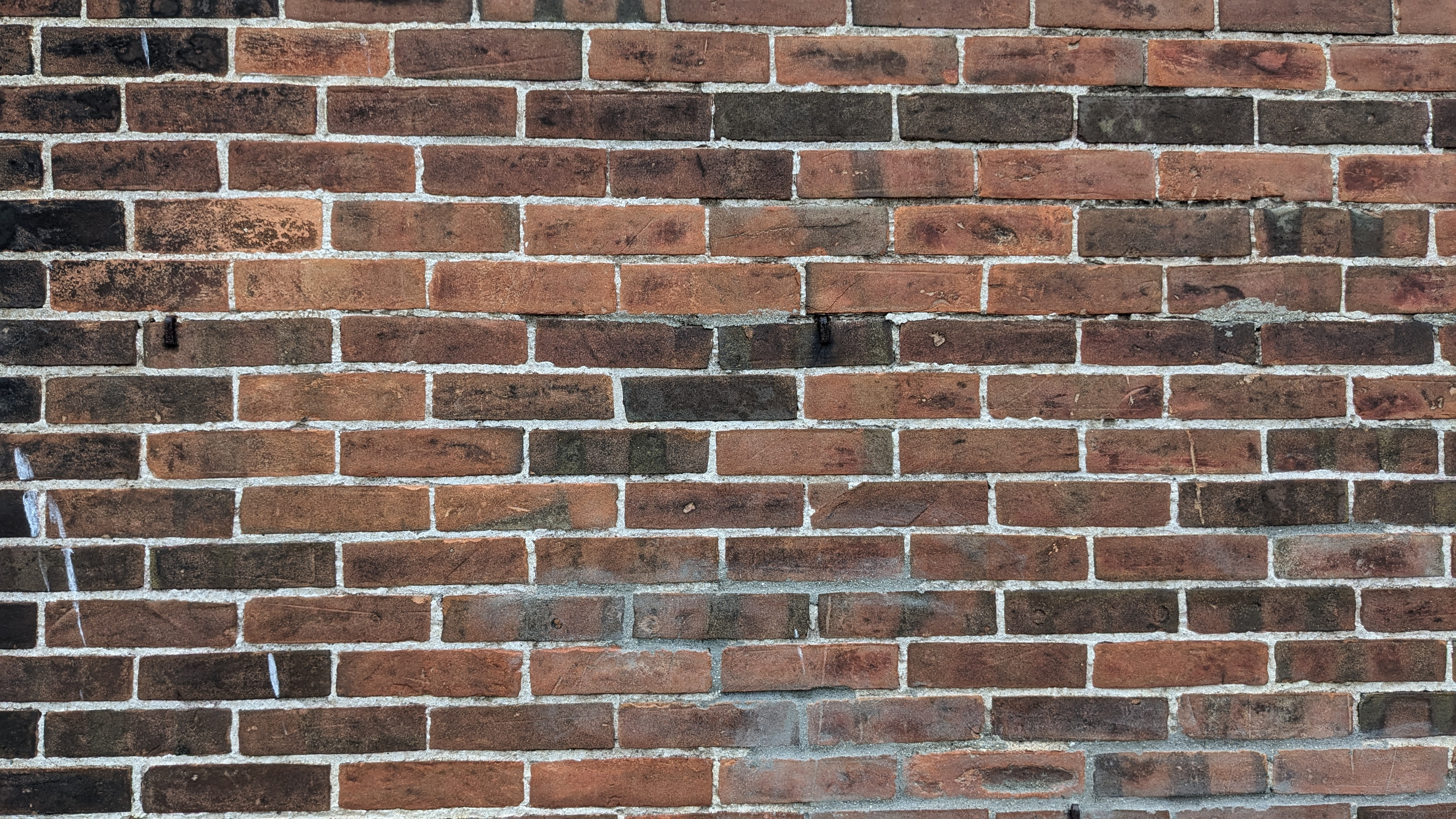
Red brick stacking

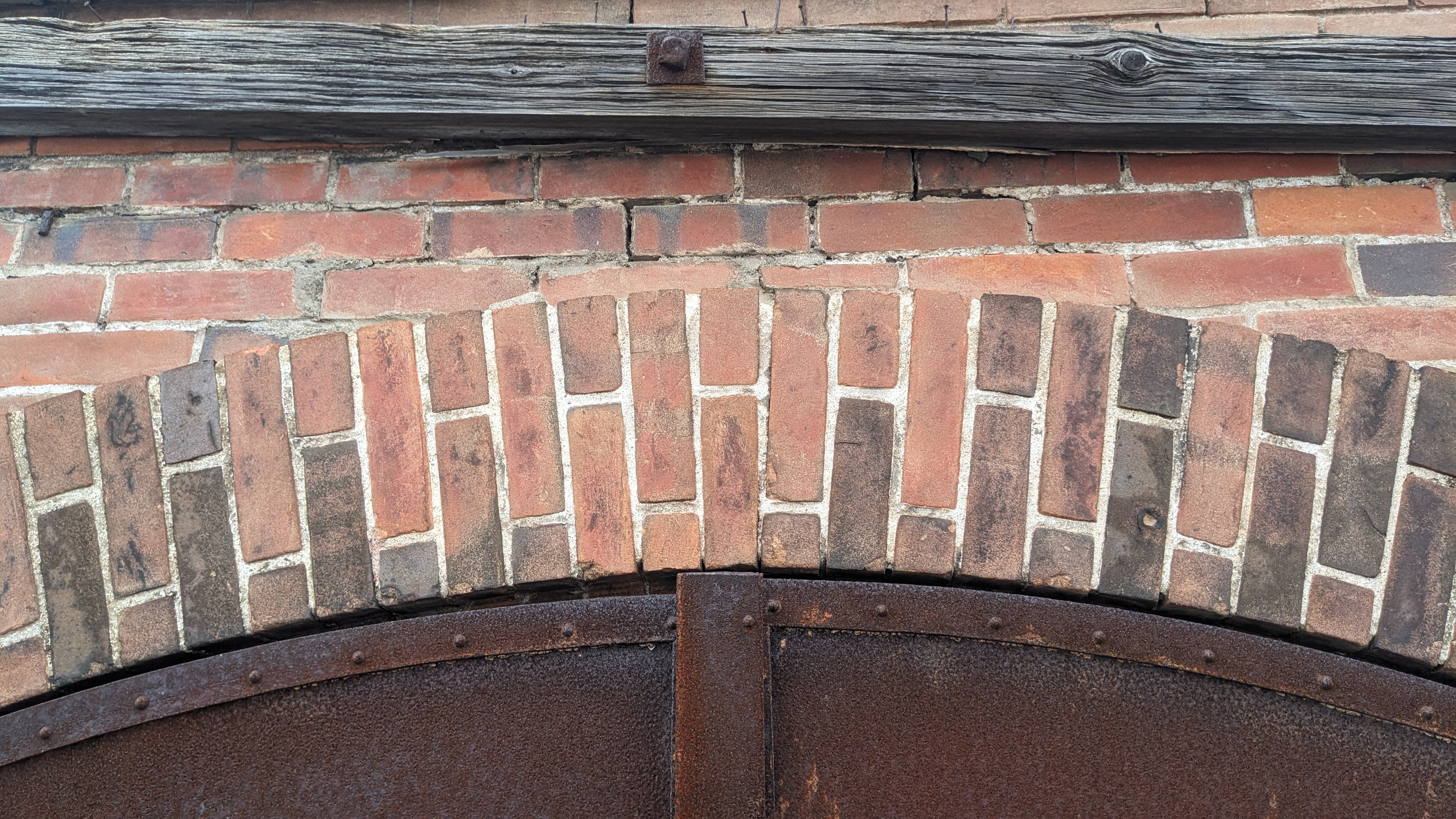
Archway

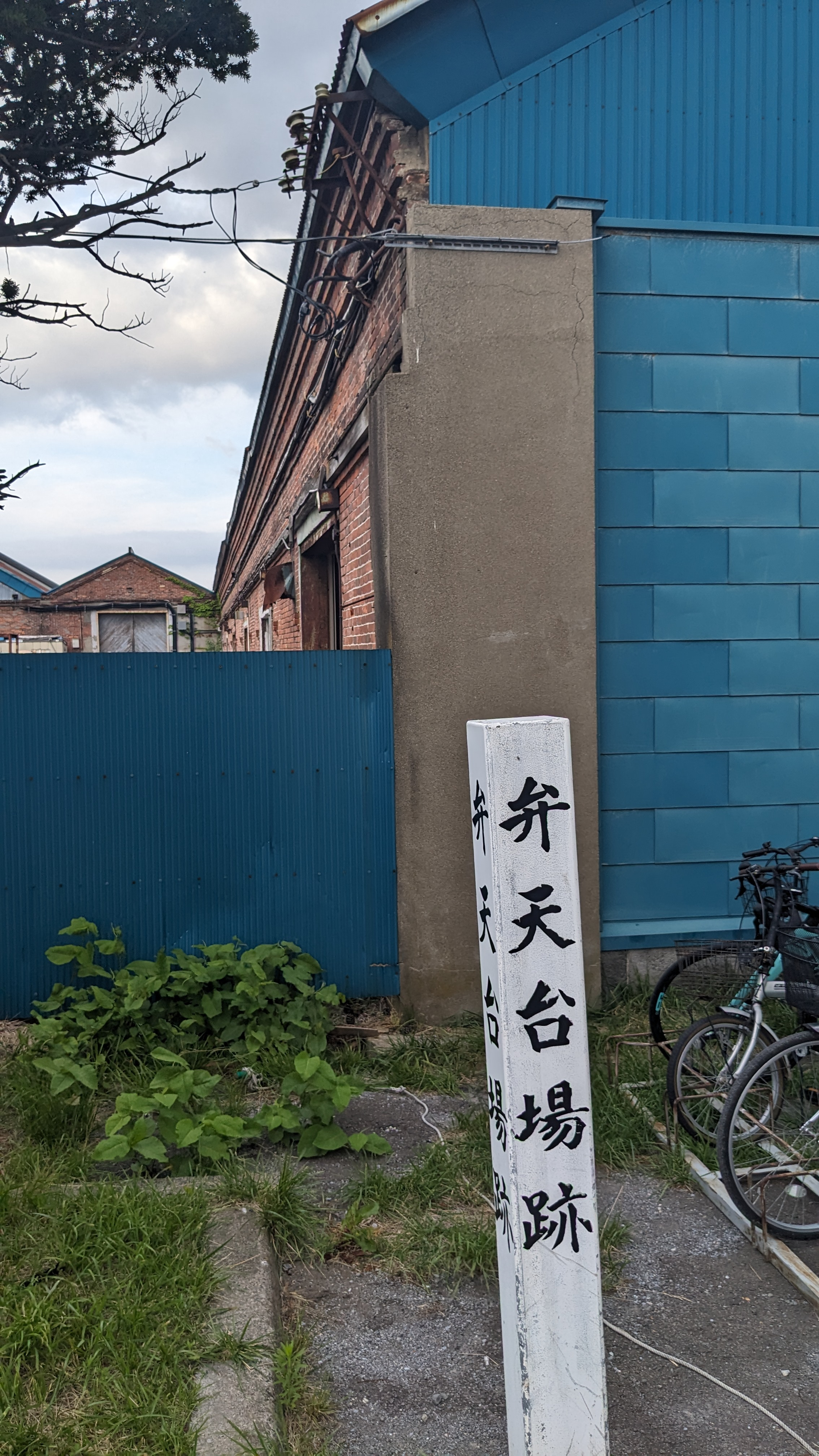
Site of Benten Daiba Monument and Hakodate Dock Red Brick Warehouses in background

== See also ==
- Great Hakodate Fire (1907)
