= List of massacres in Japan =

Massacres in Japan

The following is a list of massacres that have occurred in Japan and its predecessor entities ranging back to the Tokugawa shogunate (Some historical numbers may be approximate). The massacres are grouped into different time periods. Massacres have become a growing problem in contemporary Japan in recent years, with at least 110+ deaths during the 2010s.

Most notably, the 2019 Kyoto Animation arson attack claimed at least 36 lives and injured an additional 34. It is one of the deadliest massacres in Japan since the end of World War II and the deadliest building fire in Japan since the 2001 Myojo 56 building fire. It was considered "suicidal terrorism" by one criminology professor at Rissho University, as the attack was reportedly intended to be a suicide mission by the suspect. In December 2021, another arson attack occurred, this time at a building in Osaka, specifically at a psychiatric clinic located on the fourth floor. It killed 25 and injured an additional 3. The suspect, who died in hospital two weeks later, is believed to have been inspired by the 2019 attack in Kyoto.

== Massacres ==
=== Heian period (794–1185) ===
Date	Name	Location	Perpetrator	Deaths	Notes
15 January 1181	Siege of Nara	Nara	Taira clan	4,500	The Taira clan set fire to temples and monasteries, in all 3,500 civilians, and 1,000 warrior monks died in the burning.

=== Kamakura period (1185–1333) ===
Date	Name	Location	Perpetrator	Deaths	Notes
28 June 1193	Revenge of the Soga Brothers	Kamino, Fujino, Shizuoka Prefecture	Soga Sukenari and Tokimune	5+	The Soga brothers, Soga Sukenari and Tokimune, assassinated Kudō Suketsune, the killer of their biological father. The incident included a failed assassination attempt on the shogun, and resulted in many deaths and injuries of unrelated participants.

=== Sengoku period (1467–1603) ===
Date	Name	Location	Perpetrator	Deaths	Notes
27 March 1569	Horikawa castle massacre [ja]	Horikawa castle, Hamamatsu, Shizuoka	Ishikawa Hanzaburo	700	After it was captured, Tokugawa Ieyasu ordered Ishikawa Hanzaburo to massacre the castle prisoners and castle denizens, including women and children. It was recorded that around 700 people were beheaded on the banks of the Miyakoda River.
30 September 1571	Siege of Mount Hiei	Inside the Enryaku-ji temple complex on Mount Hiei	Oda Nobunaga's army	1,500-4,000	Massacre of the Buddhist warrior monks who refused to submit to the warlord Oda Nobunaga.
1574	Third siege of Nagashima	Nagashima fortress, Owari Province	Oda Nobunaga's army	20,000	Massacre of 20,000 Ikkō followers by the forces of Oda Nobunaga.
1579	Siege of Itami	Itami Castle, Settsu Province	Oda Nobunaga's army	670	Defenders from the Itami clan and their families were killed after the capture of Itami Castle.
27 August 1585	Odemori Castle massacre	Odemori Castle. Harimichi, Nihonmatsu, Fukushima Prefecture	Date Masamune's Forces	1,000	Date Masamune's soldiers stormed Odemori Castle, killing 1,000 people, including women and children.
13 March – 4 September 1591	Kunohe rebellion	Kunohe Castle, Mutsu Province (present-day Ninohe, Iwate Prefecture)	Forces of Toyotomi Hideyoshi	unknown	Toyotomi Hideyoshi forces executed the prisoners, along with Kunohe Masazane himself. The remaining defenders, including women and children, were forced into the second bailey, which was then set on fire. According to contemporary records, the fire burned for three days and three nights and killed all within.
5 September 1595	The massacre of Toyotomi Hidetsugu's entire family	Sanjogawara, Kyoto	Toyotomi Hideyoshi	39	Hideyoshi ordered the execution of Hidetsugu's entire family, including children, wives and concubines.

=== Tokugawa shogunate (1603–1868) ===
Date	Name	Location	Perpetrator	Deaths	Notes
12–15 April 1638	Mass beheadings at the final days of the Shimabara revolt	Inside and around Hara Castle, Minamishimabara	Shogunate army	37,000	Rebels and sympathizers were beheaded by military forces. Afterwards, the Hara Castle was also burned to the ground.
December 1696	Yoshiwara spree killing	Yoshiwara	Sano Jirōzaemon	?	Sano Jirōzaemon murdered dozens of prostitutes with a katana in Yoshiwara

=== Empire of Japan (1868–1947) ===
Date	Name	Location	Perpetrator	Deaths	Notes
25 May 1893	Kawachi Jūningiri	Chihayaakasaka, Minamikawachi District, Osaka	Kumatarō Kido and Yagorō Tani	13 (including the perpetrators)	A farmer and his accomplice targeted the families of the farmer's wife and her lover in a series of stabbings before the farmer killed his accomplice and himself after hiding in the mountainside for two weeks
1 March 1919	March 1st demonstrations	Korea under Japanese rule	Imperial Japanese Army	7,509	15,849 Koreans wounded
15 April 1919	Jeamni massacre	Hwaseong, Chōsen	Imperial Japanese Army	20 to 30	Killing of 20 to 30 unarmed Korean civilians inside a church in Hwaseong by the Imperial Japanese Army
October 1920	Gando massacre	Jiandao	Imperial Japanese Army	5,000+	
July 1922	Shinano River incident	Shinano River	Okuragumi Shokai Company	100+	Massacre of up to 100 Korean laborers who tried to escape the construction site by the Plant foremen
September 1923	Kantō Massacre	Kantō region	Imperial Japanese Army, Police and vigilante civilians	6,000+	With the explicit and implicit approval of parts of the Japanese government, the Japanese military, police, and vigilantes murdered an estimated 6,000 people: mainly ethnic Koreans, but also Chinese and misidentified Japanese, and Japanese communists, socialists, and anarchists, Multiple incidents occurred, including the Fukuda Village Incident, Kameido incident and Amakasu Incident
5 June 1931	1931 Empress of Canada stabbings	aboard RMS Empress of Canada, off Japan	Graciano Bilas	2	42-year-old Filipino passenger Graciano Bilas killed two people and wounded 29 others with a knife
21 May 1938	Tsuyama massacre	Tsuyama	Mutsuo Toi	31 (including the perpetrator)	After cutting off electricity to his village, 21-year-old Mutsuo Toi proceeded to go on a late-night killing spree with a shotgun, a katana, and an axe before killing himself, 3 injured
2 September 1944	Chichijima incident	Chichijima, Ogasawara Islands	Imperial Japanese Army	8	Japanese soldiers killed eight American airmen on Chichi Jima, in the Bonin Islands, and cannibalized four of them. The ninth, and only one to evade capture, was future U.S. President George H. W. Bush
12 May 1945	Tonokiya massacre	Tonokiya, Shioya, Ogimi Village, Okinawa Prefecture	Imperial Japanese Armed Forces	35	Ten Japanese soldiers under the command of a sergeant major appeared in the village of Watanokiya, rounded up civilians on the beach, and killed them with grenades and other weapons. 35 people, mostly women and children, were killed and 15 were injured.
June - August 1945	Kumejima Massacre	Kumejima, Kume Island, Okinawa	Imperial Japanese Navy	20	Murder of 20 residents by Imperial Japanese Navy, after they were considered spies for the American army. Part of Battle of Okinawa.
July 1945	Hanaoka incident	Ōdate	Imperial Japanese Army	418	113 prisoners of war executed; 307 also died

=== Occupied Japan (1947–1952) ===
Date	Name	Location	Perpetrator	Deaths	Notes
26 January 1948	Teigin case	Tokyo	Sadamichi Hirasawa	12	False verdict suspected
15 July 1949	Mitaka incident	Tokyo	Keisuke Takeuchi	8	20 injured. False verdict suspected
17 August 1949	Matsukawa derailment	Between Kanayagawa and Matsukawa, Fukushima Prefecture	Unknown	3	A Japanese National Railways passenger train derails and overturns on the Tōhoku Main Line between Kanayagawa and Matsukawa stations in Fukushima Prefecture due to sabotage, killing three crewmembers; all 412 passengers survive

=== State of Japan (1952–present) ===
Date	Name	Location	Perpetrator	Deaths	Notes
30 June 1966	Hakamada Incident	Shimizu, Shizuoka	Unknown	4	False verdict suspected
30 August 1974	Mitsubishi bombing	Tokyo	East Asia Anti-Japan Armed Front	8	Powerful bomb explodes at the Mitsubishi Heavy Industries headquarters in Marunouchi. Eight killed, 378 injured. Eight left-wing activists are arrested May 19, 1975, by Japanese authorities.
6 November 1975	1975 Aki shooting	Aki, Kōchi Prefecture	Ikuya Hatakeyama	6	31-year-old Ikuya Hatakeyama shoots eight of his neighbours with a 12-gauge shotgun, killing six and critically injuring two
26 - 28 January 1979	Mitsubishi Bank hostage incident	Mitsubishi Bank, Sumiyoshi-ku, Osaka	Akiyoshi Umekawa	5 (including the perpetrator)	Akiyoshi Umekawa shot dead four people in a Mitsubishi Bank
31 January 1980	Nigishima murders	Nigishima, Kumano, Mie Prefecture	Kazumichi Ikeda	8 (including the perpetrator)	Farmer Kazumichi Ikeda kills seven members of his family and injures 3 with an ax and a shotgun before killing himself
19 August 1980	Shinjuku bus attack	Shinjuku, Tokyo	Maruyama Hirobumi	6	A mentally disturbed man Maruyama Hirobumi throws a bucket of petrol and a lit newspaper into a bus. The ensuing fire killed 6 and injured 14.
9 February 1982	Japan Air Lines Flight 350	Haneda Airport, Tokyo	Seiji Katagiri	24	Flight 350 was on approach to Haneda Airport when the pilot Seiji Katagiri deliberately nose-dived the plane to crash it. The pilot was then subdued by other flight crews, yet the plane remained descending. It then crashed into Tokyo Bay. The pilot who deliberately nose-dived the plane was suffering from mental illness before the incident
9 August 1989	Taneichi murders	Taneichi, Iwate	Hidetake Kakuchiyama	5	Hidetake Kakuchiyama, a former fishing crew member, murders his wife and 4 children over a divorce dispute in Taneichi, Iwate
5 November 1989	Sakamoto family murders	Isogo-ku, Yokohama	Aum Shinrikyo	3	Tsutsumi Sakamoto, a lawyer working on a lawsuit against the cult Aum Shinrikyo, was kidnapped and murdered by members of the cult along with his wife and 14-month-old son
5 - 6 March 1992	Ichikawa Family Murder Case	Ichikawa, Chiba Prefecture	Teruhiko Seki	4	Robbery-murder of 4 members of an executive's family by Teruhiko Seki
27–28 June 1994	Matsumoto incident	Matsumoto	Aum Shinrikyo	8	Members of the Aum Shinrikyo doomsday cult released sarin gas near the homes of several judges who presiding over legal cases involving the cult. 500+ injured
20 March 1995	Tokyo subway sarin attack	Tokyo	Aum Shinrikyo	13	6,252 injured
25 July 1998	Wakayama curry-poisoning incident	Sonobe district of Wakayama, Wakayama	Masumi Hayashi	4	Four people are killed and 63 injured after eating curry laced with arsenic at a community festival in Wakayama. Festivalgoer Masumi Hayashi was sentenced to death and is currently appealing.
8 September 1999	Ikebukuro massacre	Tokyo	Hiroshi Zota	2	6 injured
29 September 1999	Shimonoseki Station massacre	Shimonoseki	Yasuaki Uwabe	5	Yasuaki Uwabe, a former architect, drove a rented car into Shimonoseki Station and hit at least 7 people, two of whom died before the car got stuck. He then proceeded to stab pedestrians at random with a kitchen knife, injuring 4 and killing a further 3. Uwabe was eventually apprehended by a station worker and was arrested shortly after. Uwabe was executed in 2012.
30 December 2000	Setagaya family murder	Setagaya	Unknown	4	A family of four are murdered at their home in suburban Tokyo by an unknown intruder, the case remains unsolved.
8 May 2001	Takefuji Hirosaki branch arson murder case	Hirosaki, Aomori prefecture	Mitsuhiro Kobayashi	5	A former taxi driver Mitsuhiro Kobayashi kills 5 employees and hurts 4 during a robbery followed by arson at a Takefuji Corp branch in Hirosaki.
8 June 2001	Ikeda school massacre	Ikeda	Mamoru Takuma	8	37-year-old former janitor Mamoru Takuma entered an elementary school in Osaka, then used a kitchen knife to kill 8 students. He wounded an additional 13 other students and 2 teachers
1 September 2001	Myojo 56 building fire	Shinjuku	Unknown	44	Perpetrator never caught.
20 June 2003	Fukuoka family murder case	Higashi-ku, Fukuoka	Wei Wei, Yang Ning and Wang Liang	4	Businessman Shinjiro Matsumoto, his wife Chika and two children aged 11 and 8 are murdered in a robbery by three Chinese students who broke into their home and dumped their bodies in Hakata Bay. Two of the three - Yang Ning and Wang Liang – fled to China where they were arrested. Yang was executed and Wang sentenced to life imprisonment. The third, Wei Wei, was arrested in Japan and was held on death row until finally executed in December 2019.
18 - 20 September 2004	Ōmuta murders	Omuta, Fukuoka	Kitamura-gumi	4	Married Yakuza couple Jitsuo and Mami Kitamura and their sons Takashi and Takahiro killed a woman, her two sons, and the friend of one her sons over a loan debt.
19 - 23 March 2008	Tsuchiura massacre	Tsuchiura, Ibaraki	Masahiro Kanagawa	2	7 injured
8 June 2008	Akihabara massacre	Chiyoda	Tomohiro Katō	7	10 injured
1 October 2008	Osaka movie theatre fire	Osaka	Kazuhiro Ogawa	16	
12 January 2010	2010 Habikino shooting	Iichan bar, Habikino, Osaka Prefecture	Yasuhisa Sugiura	4 (including the perpetrator)	Three people were shot and killed at a bar, including the gunman's mother-in-law, before the gunman committed suicide
14 March 2013	Etajima stabbings	Etajima, Hiroshima	Chen Shuangxi	2	6 wounded
21 – 22 July 2013	Yamaguchi arson and murders	Mitake	Kosei Homi	5	
9 March 2015	Sumoto stabbings	Sumoto, Awaji Island, Hyōgo Prefecture	Tatsuhiko Hirano	5	Tatsuhiko Hirano stabs to death five neighbors with a knife in two separate homes in Sumoto, Awaji Island
17 May 2015	Kawasaki building fire	Kawasaki, Kanagawa Prefecture	Unknown	11	11 people died and 17 were seriously injured in an arson attack on 2 buildings
14 - 16 September 2015	Kumagaya murders	Kumagaya, Saitama	Vayron Jonathan Nakada Ludeña	6	Vayron Jonathan Nakada Ludeña brother of Peruvian serial killer Pedro Pablo Nakada Ludeña kills 6 people by stabbing in a three-day murder spree
26 July 2016	Sagamihara stabbings	Sagamihara	Satoshi Uematsu	19	26 injured
5 - 6 June 2017	Ogori murders	Ogori, Fukuoka	Mitsuru Nakata	3	A former police officer Mitsuru Nakata kills his wife and two children
6 October 2017	Komatsu family murder	Hitachi, Ibaraki	Hirobumi Komatsu	6	Hirobumi Komatsu killed his wife and five children by stabbing. He then set the bodies on fire.
31 March - 1 April 2018	Hioki murders	Hioki, Kagoshima Prefecture, Kyushu	Tomohiro Iwakura	5	Tomohiro Iwakura kills four members of his family and a neighbor by strangulation
25 - 26 November 2018	Takachiho murders	Takachiho, Nishiusuki District, Miyazaki Prefecture	Masahiro lihoshi	7 (including the perpetrator)	Masahiro lihoshi stabs his family and friend to death before committing suicide by jumping from a bridge
28 May 2019	Kawasaki stabbings	Tama ward of Kawasaki City, Kanagawa Prefecture	Ryuichi Iwasaki	3 (including the perpetrator)	18 injured
18 July 2019	Kyoto Animation arson attack	Kyoto	Shinji Aoba	36	33 injured
4 June 2020	Takarazuka familicide	Takarazuka, Hyōgo	Hideaki Nozu	3	A man killed his grandmother, brother, and mother with a crossbow.
17 December 2021	Osaka building fire	Osaka	Morio Tanimoto	27 (including the perpetrator)	27 people are killed and 1 are injured during an arson attack at a medical clinic in Osaka
25 May 2023	Nagano attack	Nagano	Masanori Aoki	4	Attacker stabbed 2 women dead, then shot 2 responding police officers.
