= Kanemori Red Brick Warehouses =

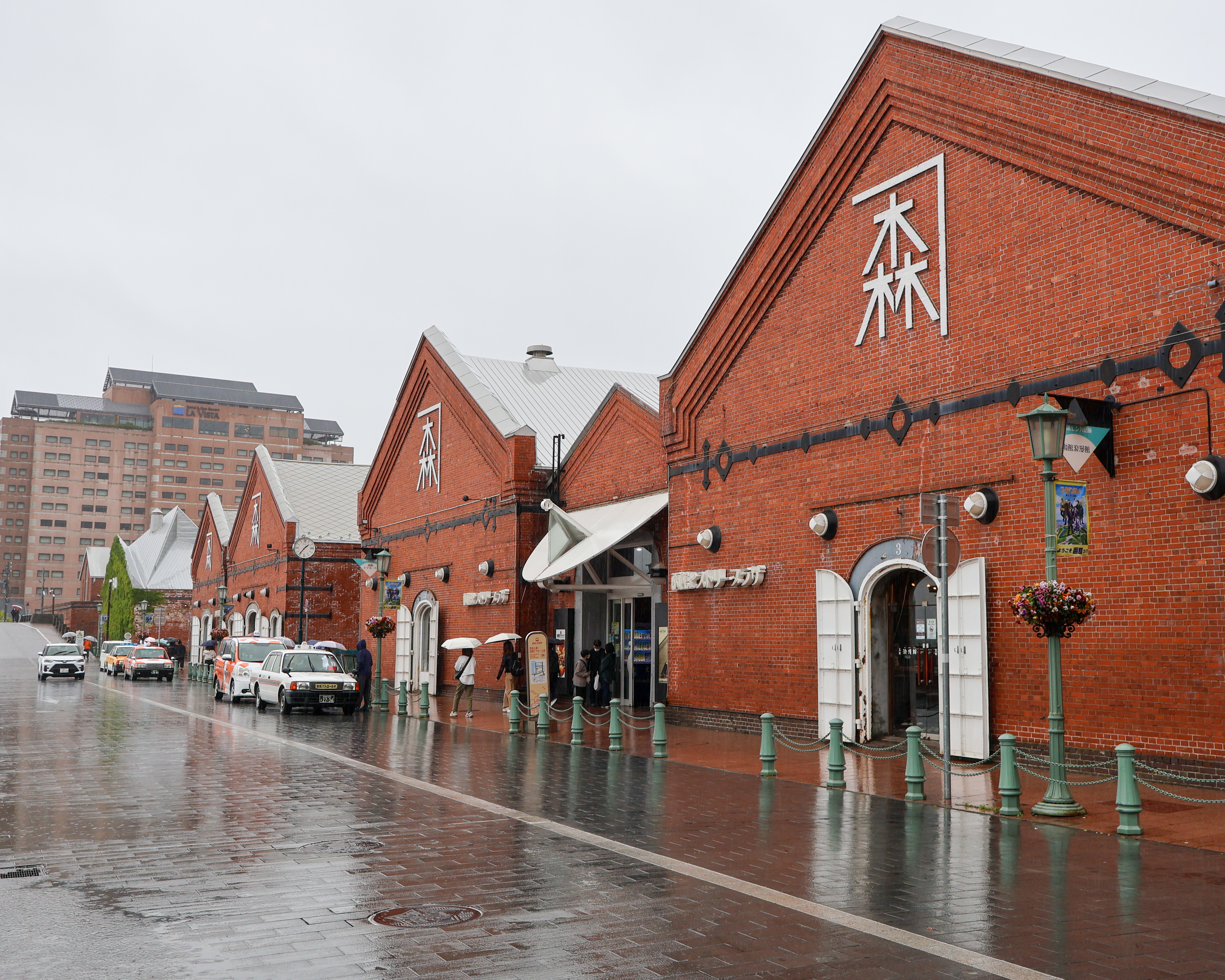
- Interactive map of the Kanemori Red Brick Warehouses area

General information
- Location: Suehirochō 14-12, Hakodate, Hokkaido, Japan
- Coordinates: 41.7661°N 140.7175°E
- Completed: 1909 (rebuilt after fire)
- Renovated: 1988 (commercial conversion)
- Owner: Kanemori Shosen Co., Ltd.

Website
- www.hakodate-kanemori.com

The Kanemori Red Brick Warehouses (金森赤レンガ倉庫, Kanemori Akarenga Sōko) are a group of historic red brick warehouses located in Hakodate, Hokkaido, Japan. They are managed and operated by Kanemori Shosen Co., Ltd.

== History ==
The warehouses trace their origins to 1869, when Kumashiro Watanabe from Ōita Prefecture established the Kanemori Western Goods Store in Hakodate. In 1887, he began operating commercial warehouse services, becoming Hakodate's first commercial warehouse business.

The warehouses suffered significant damage in the Great Hakodate Fire of 1907, which destroyed six warehouse buildings. They were quickly rebuilt using fireproof materials and completed in 1909. Unlike the Kanemori Warehouses, the Hakodate Dock Red Brick Warehouses (built in 1901) survived this fire and remain among the oldest red brick warehouse structures in the area.

The large characters on the gables read mori (森). They are framed by a right angle (┐), which resembles a carpenter's square, which is called kane (矩) in Japanese, which in turn is homophonous with the first character of the warehouse name, kane (金). Together, the right angle symbol, read kane, and mori (森) therefore spell out the name of the warehouses, Kanemori (金森), a Japanese family name.

== Present day ==
Since 1988, the warehouses have been converted into a commercial complex featuring shopping malls, restaurants, and event spaces. The facilities include BAY Hakodate, Hakodate History Plaza, Kanemori Western Goods Hall, and Kanemori Hall. The complex attracts 1.5 to 2 million tourists annually and has become one of Hakodate's major tourist destinations.

== See also ==
- Hakodate Dock Red Brick Warehouses
- Hakodate
