= Myojo 56 building fire =

Japanese disaster that killed 44 people in 2001

Coordinates: 35°41′41″N 139°42′05″E

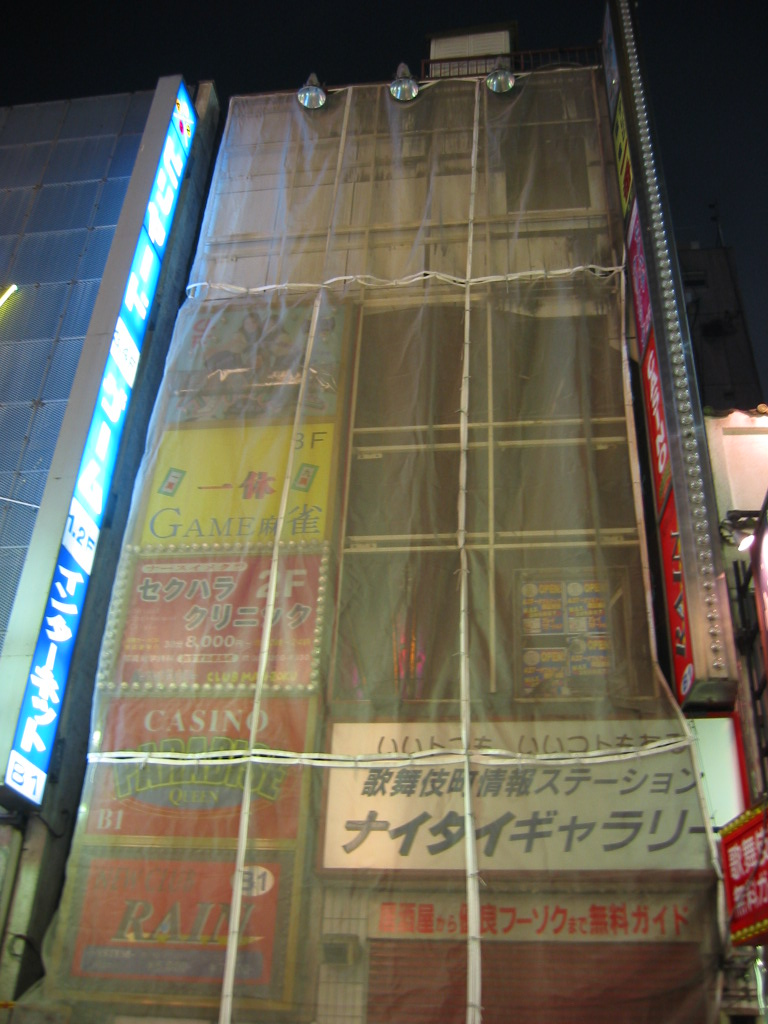
- Myojo 56 in June 2003, still shuttered nearly 2 years after the fire
- Native name: 明星56ビル火災
- Location: Kabukicho section of Shinjuku, Tokyo, Japan
- Date: 1 September 2001 ≈ 1:00 a.m. (JST (UTC+09:00))
- Target: Unknown
- Attack type: Suspected arson, mass murder
- Deaths: 44
- Injuries: 3
- Perpetrator: Unknown
- Motive: Unknown

The Myojo 56 building fire (明星56ビル火災, Myōjō Gojū-Roku Biru Kasai) was a structural fire that began at about 01:00 local time on September 1, 2001, in the Myojo 56 building, located in the Kabukichō section of Shinjuku, Tokyo, Japan.

The fire, the fifth-deadliest in post-war Japanese history, burned for five hours before being extinguished and resulted in the death of 44 people and injuries to another three. It is suspected that the fire resulted from arson, but no suspect was ever arrested. In the aftermath of the incident, media coverage (which declined after the September 11 attacks that occurred 10 days later) focused on the arrest and conviction of the property owners for criminal negligence and on the building's putative ties to organized crime.

== Fire ==
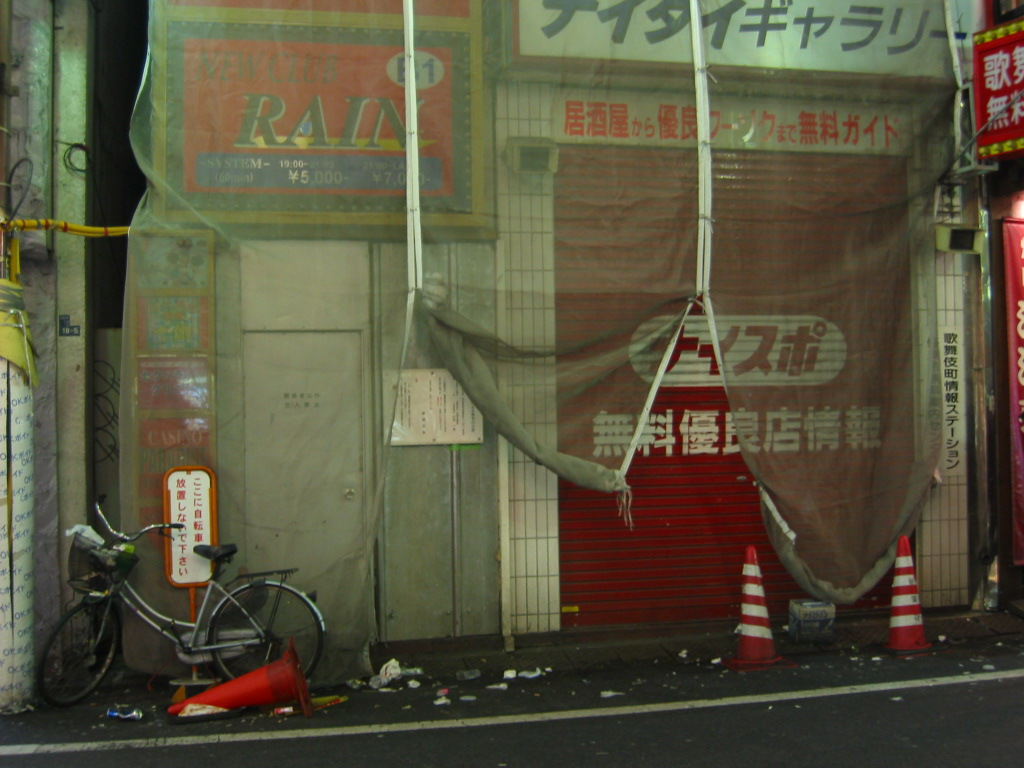
Building after fire (front of the 1st floor).

The fire burned on the third floor of the building. When the fire broke out, 19 people were on the third floor and 28 on the fourth floor. Three employees jumped out of the building from the third floor and survived, suffering injuries. Witnesses who saw one of the employees called an ambulance.

Emergency responders arriving to treat the jumpers learned of the building fire and evacuation efforts commenced. Firefighters removed the bodies of 44 people (32 men and 12 women) from inside the building, and rescued those who managed to flee to the roof.

== Victims ==
=== Female ===
- Sayuri Nakamura, 22
- sisters Aiko and Saiko Ueda, 26 and 22
- Kiyoko Shimizu, 29
- Miyuki Ichikawa, 19
- Misae Tsakamoto, 24
- Megumi Ieta, 18
- Rena Yumimoto, 26
- Suki Makao, 31
- Chieko Watarase, 21
- Rie Fukushima, 35
- Suzuka Isogai, 38

=== Male ===
- Taichi Matsuda, 53
- Aoi Yoshioka, 28
- Shion Miyamoto, 41
- Kyo Fujimoto, 37
- Tomomi Sugimoto, 27
- Katsumi Itou
- Isamu Nozawa
- Daisuke Fujisawa
- Rokuro Matsuda
- Hanzō Shinoda
- Jiro Kusumoto
- Nao Himura
- Ryōsuke Nakajima
- Yū Ishikawa
- Yuki Ishikawa
- Hanzō Satō
- Shigeru Urano
- Ichirou Yuuki
- Hajime Miyajima
- Hifumi Miyagawa
- Kyo Matsumoto
- Tadashi Miyashita
- Rokurou Hoshino
- Kazuhiko Kumamoto
- Hanzou Kawaguchi
- Nobuharu Kiyoko
- Toshikazu Matsubara
- 5 more unnamed victims

== Aftermath ==
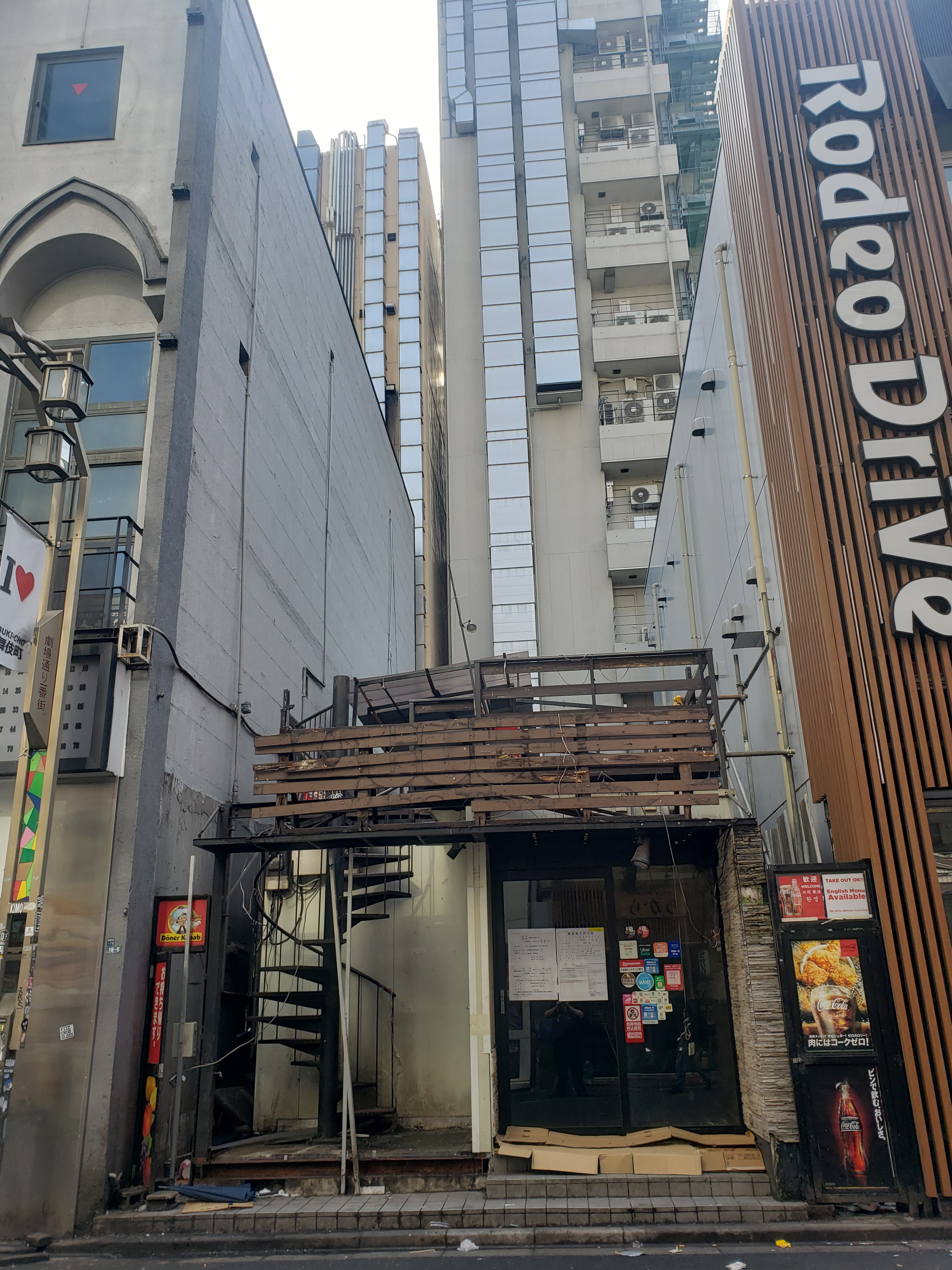
The site where the building once stood in April 2026

Police officials remarked that the lethality of the fire was exacerbated by numerous violations of the fire code, including blocked fire doors and stairwells. The main cause of death among the fire's victims was found to be carbon monoxide poisoning. An investigation conducted by the Metropolitan Police Department concluded that if the building's automated fire doors had not been prevented from closing, deadly gases would not have reached the building's occupied rooms for at least 20 minutes.

One injured man, seen near the burning building, later disappeared. The building was demolished in May 2006, and replaced with a one-story restaurant.

=== Criminal allegations ===
Six individuals were arrested in conjunction with the blaze, on charges of professional negligence resulting in death. Those charged included two executives of the Myojo Kosan Group, which owned the building, and the commercial tenants of the structure, which housed a video mahjong parlor and a hostess bar. On July 2, 2008, five of the defendants were convicted of negligence in the Tokyo District Court. The sixth defendant was acquitted.

By July 3, 2008, Tokyo police had concluded that the fire resulted from arson, but had not made any corresponding arrest.

Japan Today, an English-language online news outlet, quoted Tokyo police as stating that the mahjong parlor located in the building was "an illegal gambling den" with daily revenues of about eight million yen. Japan Today's report speculates that the Chinese mafia and yakuza could have been linked to the incident, as illegal gambling operations are regularly forced to pay "protection money" to organized crime syndicates. However, there is no material or eyewitness evidence of organized crime involvement in the fire.

== See also ==
- List of major crimes in Japan
- List of massacres in Japan
- Sennichi Department Store Building fire
- 2019 Kyoto Animation arson attack
- 2021 Osaka building fire
