= 1973 Taiyo Department Store fire =

Fatal fire in Kumamoto Prefecture, Japan

Coordinates: 32°48′08″N 130°42′32″E

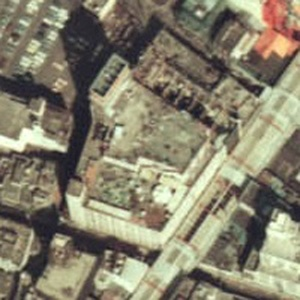
- The Taiyo Department Store in March 1975, 1 year after the fire
- Native name: 大洋デパート火災
- Date: November 29, 1973
- Location: Shimodori 1-chome, 3-10, Kumamoto, Kumamoto Prefecture, Japan
- Type: Fire
- Cause: Unknown
- Deaths: 104
- Injuries: 67
- Property damage: Taiyo Department severely damaged, extensive repairs led to the store being closed for over a year

The Taiyo Department Store fire was a fire at the Taiyo Department Store, a department store in Kumamoto City, Kumamoto Prefecture, Japan. The fire started at 1:15 p.m. on November 29, 1973; 104 people died. After the fire, regulations pertaining to the construction of buildings were strengthened, one of which mandated external stairs on highrise buildings.

The Taiyo Department Store had a basement floor and nine stories. The second and ninth floor of the store were under construction. It was the most popular department store in Kumamoto City at that time.

== Description ==
The fire started on the platform of steps between the second and third floors, on which goods were placed. The cause of the fire was never determined; though it is possibly mismanagement of cigarettes. The fire sprinkler system did not work because of ongoing construction work. The fire was televised live and it was reported that the smoke, which was in various colors and odors, was poisonous. Many people were saved from the rooftop of the store. Some people jumped to the ceiling of a nearby arcade under construction and were injured.

There were a total of 104 fatalities. Among the department store employees, 10 men and 36 women died, as well as three part-time female workers and three male construction workers. Among customers, 16 males and 32 females died. Causes of death included 70 deaths by carbon dioxide intoxication and 30 deaths by suffocation. Forty-three males and 77 females were injured. Seventy-one dead bodies were found: two on the third floor, 11 on the fourth floor, one on the fifth floor, 26 on the sixth floor, 30 on the seventh floor, and one on the eighth floor. The fire was one of the deadliest department store fires in Japan.

== Analysis ==
The Kumamoto City Physicians' Association later pointed out that every physicians' association should prepare for such disasters and organize rescue teams with medical instruments. Injured persons should be saved and transferred as soon as possible. There should be a unified system which gives directions in such large-scale disasters. Practitioners should work as volunteers.

Soon after the fire, a university professor observed the burnt department store and wrote the following comments.

- It was reported that smoke issued from a cardboard box; a part-time employee informed Employees A and B, who informed Section Chief D and four or five people rushed to the scene. A fire hose did not work because of low pressure. An ABC fire extinguisher(s) was there, though they may not have known how to use it; 20 bucketfuls of water were not effective. The fire wall went down after the button was pushed twice; however some Japanese cushions were in the way and caught fire.
- The response of the department store was poor. Telephone Operator E received the fire call from A and B, and forwarded the call to Chief F; who said he dialed 119 but it did not go to the fire station. The inside broadcasting system required the permission of a superior who could not be reached. Operator E could view what was happening but escaped on the elevator with other employees.
- Additional factors included lack of ambient illumination; many persons stated that the electricity went down and smoke darkened the interior. Without the guidance of employees, it was hard for customers to find employees' elevators to escape. With the guidance of employees, 70 guests who were in the dining room and 60 employees escaped to the rooftop.

== Aftermath ==
The 1972 Sennichi Department Store Building fire and the 1973 Taiyo Department Store fire, both of which caused many casualties, finally led to amendments of the Construction Standard Law and the Fire Fighting Law. These amendments mandated steps to prevent smoke from hindering escape.

== See also ==
- History of Kumamoto Prefecture
- Sennichi Department Store Building fire
