= Takarazuka familicide =

2020 crime in Japan

- Location: Takarazuka, Hyōgo, Japan
- Date: 4 June 2020 c. 5:00 am – 10:10 am
- Attack type: Shooting; familicide
- Weapon: Crossbow
- Deaths: 3
- Injuries: 1
- Perpetrator: Hideaki Nozu
- Motive: Resentment against his family; Desire to receive the death penalty

On 4 June 2020, 23-year-old Hideaki Nozu murdered three of his family members, along with gravely injuring one more using a crossbow at their home in Takarazuka, Hyōgo, Japan. The incident received international coverage due to its brutal nature, and crossbows were subsequently restricted in Japan as a direct result of the killings. On 31 October 2025, he was sentenced to life imprisonment.

== Events ==
On 4 June 2020 at around 5:00 am, Nozu shot his 75-year-old grandmother Yoshimi in the back of the head, instantly killing her. He then dragged her body upstairs and wiped down the blood to prevent his relatives from finding out. At 6:00 am, he shot his 22-year-old brother Hideyuki in the side of the head while he was in the bathroom, then returned to his room, hoping his brother would die. At 8:30 am, Nozu returned to the bathroom, and, realizing his brother was still alive, shot him again. He then called for his 47-year-old mother Mayumi, and shot her in the side of the head as she came, killing her instantly. At around 9:10 am, his 49-year-old aunt arrived at the house. Nozu shot her in the neck at 10:10 am, at which point she ran outside, screaming for help. Nozu decided against killing her, as she was still wearing a bicycle helmet which would prevent any further shots from being fatal.

Police arrived on scene at around 10:15 am. Nozu was arrested at the scene, declaring to police that he "intended to kill my family".

All fatal victims were shot in the head at close range, whereas the surviving victim was shot in the neck. Both female victims died instantly, whereas Hideyuki initially survived the attack before eventually succumbing to his wounds. His aunt, who was shot in the neck, reportedly survived her injuries since she was wearing a bicycle helmet at the time of the attack. Police believe five bolts were shot in total from a crossbow just over 50 centimeters in length.

== Perpetrator ==
Hideaki Nozu (野津英滉, Nodzu Hideaki) was a student at a university in Kobe at the time of the murders. His parents divorced around the time his younger brother was born, and he lived with his mother, brother and grandmother. Nozu was diagnosed with Autism Spectrum Disorder when he was in elementary school, possibly inherited from his mother, who was diagnosed with Asperger syndrome and developmental disorders, and reportedly burst into fits of rage. He originally started developing suicidal thoughts in junior high school, but decided against it out of resentment for his mother, who he felt would not care if he committed suicide.

He began to plan his attack around 2 or 3 years hitherto, originally deciding to use combat knives, though he later backed out of this plan due to the gory nature of such a stabbing. He then bought two crossbows and 16 bolts, keeping them hidden in his room. In the months before the attack, he stopped attending university classes and locked himself in his room, essentially becoming a hikikomori. His university had recently expelled him due to his constant absence, though he was not informed of it yet.

He had reportedly brought the crossbow before (hidden in a triangular bag) to his aunt's house, and claimed "this will be important from now on," before leaving. It was later revealed he had originally planned on killing her, though he backed out of this plan.

== Legal proceedings ==
In his university classes, Nozu learnt that the murder of three people would often be given the death penalty within the Japanese judicial system, and reportedly hoped that the murder of four people, especially family members, would lead to him being sentenced to death and executed, thus "settling" all the issues he had with his family and end with his own death.

Nozu's trial commenced in September 2025, and had been delayed for three years due to Nozu's mental health issues. His defense argued that he was in a diminished mental state at the time of the attack due to his autism. Although prosecutors sought the death penalty, something that Nozu himself also wished for, on 31 October 2025 he was sentenced to life imprisonment, with Judge Chiwaki Matsuda citing his neurological condition as the key diminishing factor that spared him from capital punishment, along with the fact that the crime was "confined within the family".

== Aftermath ==
The attack brought attention to the relatively unregulated sales of crossbows in Japan, which were available for purchase to anyone over 18 at the time. In March 2022, crossbows became illegal to possess in Japan without a required license, in part due to the events that happened in Takarazuka.
