= 2021 Osaka building fire =

Suspected arson attack in Osaka, Japan

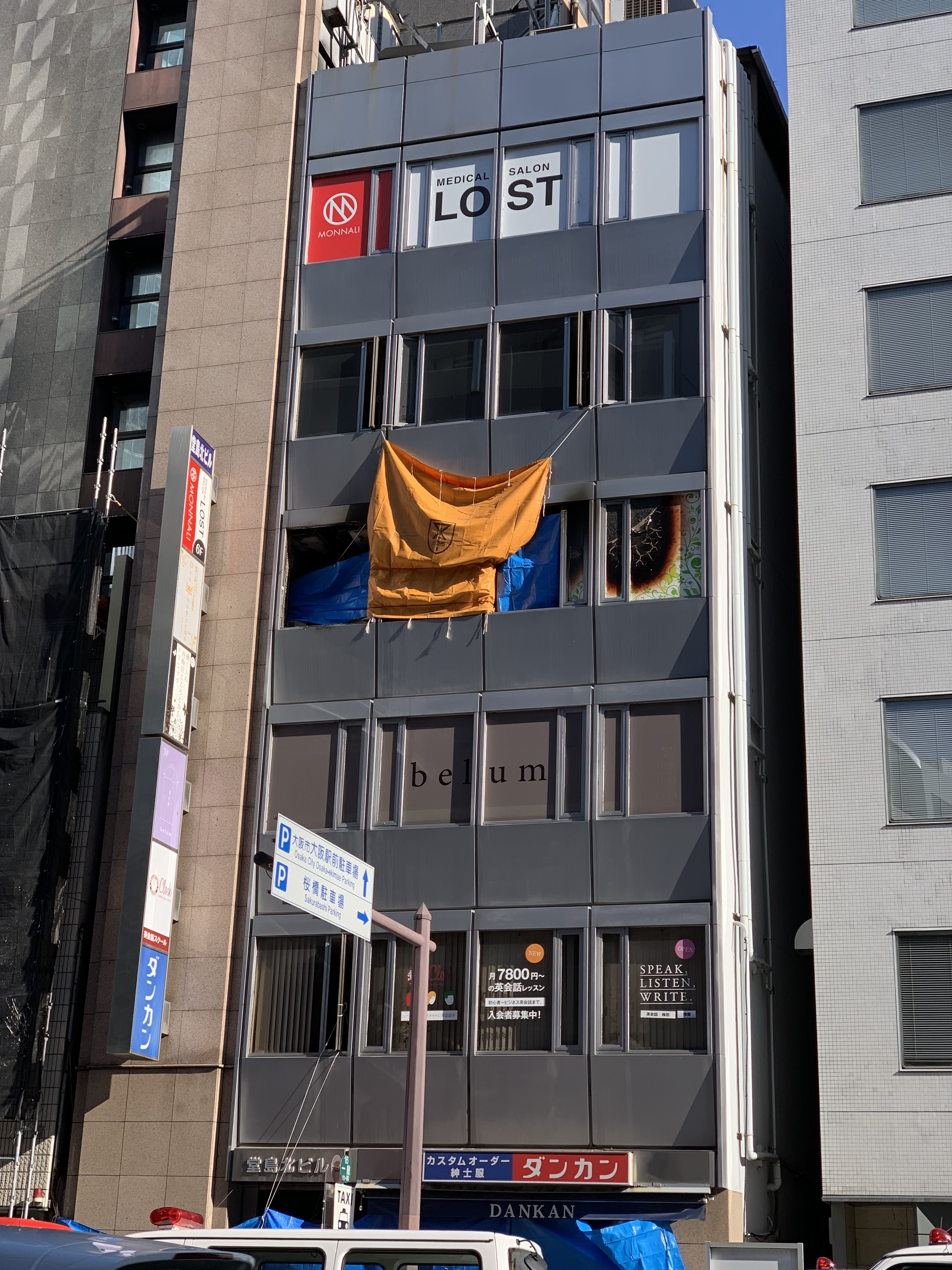
- The building after the fire
- Location: 34.6977°N 135.4957°E; Nishi Umeda clinic for the mind and body, Kita-ku, Osaka, Japan
- Date: 17 December 2021; 4 years ago 10:20 a.m. (JST)
- Attack type: Arson, mass murder, suspected murder-suicide
- Deaths: 27 (including the perpetrator)
- Injuries: 1
- Perpetrator: Morio Tanimoto (谷本盛雄)
- Motive: Unknown

On 17 December 2021, a fire occurred in a psychiatric clinic located on the fourth floor of the Dojima Kita Building in Kita-ku, Osaka, Japan. The fire is suspected to have been started deliberately. It killed 26 people (Note: Twenty-four of the victims died on the day of the fire and two others died in the following days.) and injured another.

On 30 December, the suspect, 61-year-old Morio Tanimoto (谷本盛雄, Tanimoto Morio), died of injuries sustained in the fire.

== Fire ==
On 17 December 2021, at 10:20 a.m. local time, a fire broke out at an eight-story building in Kita, a ward of Osaka, Japan. The fire broke out in a psychiatric clinic that is located on the fourth floor, called Nishi Umeda Kokoro to Karada no Kurinikku (西梅田こころとからだのクリニック, Nishi Umeda Clinic for the Mind and Body). The clinic primarily treats patients with depression and panic disorder, but also physical ailments, including anemia and sleep apnea. The clinic had a counselling session at 10:00 a.m. local time for patients intending to re-enter the workforce. This session was the reason that so many victims were at the clinic during the fire.

According to two survivors who were at the reception desk, a man walked into the clinic carrying a paper bag, which he placed next to a heater at the reception desk. He kicked the bag, spilling and igniting the liquid inside the bag, and the entire floor was set on fire.

Dozens of firefighters rushed to the building and the blaze was brought under control in approximately thirty minutes. The Osaka Municipal Fire Department said that seventy fire trucks and ambulances rushed to the scene. Most of the exterior of the building remained intact, as the fire was limited to a 20-square-metre (220 sq ft) area. The department received a report on the fire at 10:18 and the fire was nearly extinguished by 10:46.

The victims gasped for air and had difficulties escaping, as there was only one escape route, with the emergency stairs and elevators being located outside the clinic.

== Victims ==
Twenty-four people were confirmed dead at the scene of the fire, while three more died in the hospital after the event, including the suspect and the 27th victim who suffered smoke inhalation, but survived. Fourteen of the deceased were men and ten were women. The ages of the victims ranged from twenty to sixty. All of the victims were either patients or staff at the clinic.

The four injured include the suspect, who was hospitalised in critical condition with severe burns, two women who were unconscious and in critical condition, and a third woman who sustained minor injuries but survived. On 21 December, a woman in her 20s who was in critical condition with cardiac arrest died at 2:50 a.m., bringing the number killed to 25. The next day, another injured woman died, bringing the death toll to 26.

A doctor who treated some of the casualties told reporters that many of the victims, as suggested by their limited external injuries, died from carbon monoxide poisoning. Osaka police also said the cause of death was carbon monoxide poisoning.

== Investigation ==
Police stated that they suspect that the fire was arson, and are said to be investigating further. Traces of a highly flammable liquid, most likely to be gasoline (petrol), were found at the site. Traces on the clinic's ceiling and the speed of the fire support the suspicion of arson.

On 18 December, police searched the suspect's house in Nishiyodogawa-ku, Osaka. The suspect had moved into the house a few months prior to the fire. Half an hour prior to the building fire, there was a small fire at the suspect's house. The suspect, Morio Tanimoto (Japanese: 谷本盛雄), is a 61-year-old Osaka resident, who was born in the Konohana Ward of Osaka in 1960, and a former patient of the clinic; he was later identified as a retired metal worker who had been a patient of the clinic for two to three years. According to evidence from NHK, Tanimoto had lived a stable life in the Nishiyodogawa Ward of Osaka, but divorced in 2008. Tanimoto once hoped to reconcile with his ex-wife, but was still rejected.

Police stated the attack may have been a copycat of the 2019 Kyoto Animation arson attack, as police found an old newspaper piece on the Kyoto attack in the suspect's home. In November, the suspect purchased 10 litres of petrol in what appears to be an act of preparation. Following the Kyoto attack, purchasing petrol in containers requires an ID and an explanation to the seller. The suspect produced his ID and said that the purchased petrol was for his motorcycle.

In 2011, the suspect stabbed his own son in the head in an apparent forced suicide. He served prison time for this act.

Experts were surprised by the fire's high death toll. The authorities are investigating how victims became trapped and the floor filled up with smoke so quickly. According to officials, the building had no previous fire code violations.

A security camera in the building showed that the suspect tossed a bag, probably containing petrol, at the emergency exit. Tape is also believed to have been used to impede the use of the door. It is believed this was done so that clinic occupants would have a hard time evacuating. Investigators also found evidence of additional traps in the building. The suspect was found to possess a knife, and blocked a person who tried to run back towards the elevator. The victims, with the path to the exits blocked by fire, went into inner windowless rooms in the back of the clinic where they died.

The suspect was in critical condition due to carbon monoxide poisoning and had cerebral hypoxia, severe brain damage, and did not regain consciousness. However, police were working on evidence against him. On 30 December, he died in hospital as a result of injuries sustained in the fire. Police stated that he was rescued from the fire showing no vital signs, and he was subsequently put on life support in hospital. The cause of death was recorded as carbon monoxide poisoning.

Police also examined Tanimoto's financial circumstances in the years leading up to the fire. His only income, from renting out a house he owned in Nishiyodogawa Ward, ended in September 2020, and his bank balance, which had stood at roughly ¥1.5 million in January 2015, had fallen to zero by January 2021. He had unsuccessfully applied for public welfare assistance in February 2017 and again in May 2021; people close to the matter said his 2011 conviction for attacking his son made it difficult for him to find steady work afterward. Investigators treated Tanimoto's financial hardship as a possible contributing factor, though a definitive motive for the attack was never established.

In March 2023, the Osaka District Public Prosecutors Office formally closed the case without indicting Tanimoto, since he had already died in December 2021.

== Reactions ==
Prime minister Fumio Kishida said that "A very tragic incident occurred. First of all, we must make efforts to prevent a recurrence by grasping the actual situation and clarifying the cause and circumstances."

Osaka governor Hirofumi Yoshimura wrote that "The municipal fire department is investigating the cause of the fire. I have received a report that Osaka police is investigating the fire as a possible arson". Minister for Internal Affairs and Communications Yasushi Kaneko ordered the inspection of some 30,000 buildings in Japan that have three or more floors, but only a single stairwell.

== See also ==
- List of building or structure fires
- Myojo 56 building fire (2001)
