= Great Fire of Hakodate =

1934 conflagration in Hakodate, Japan

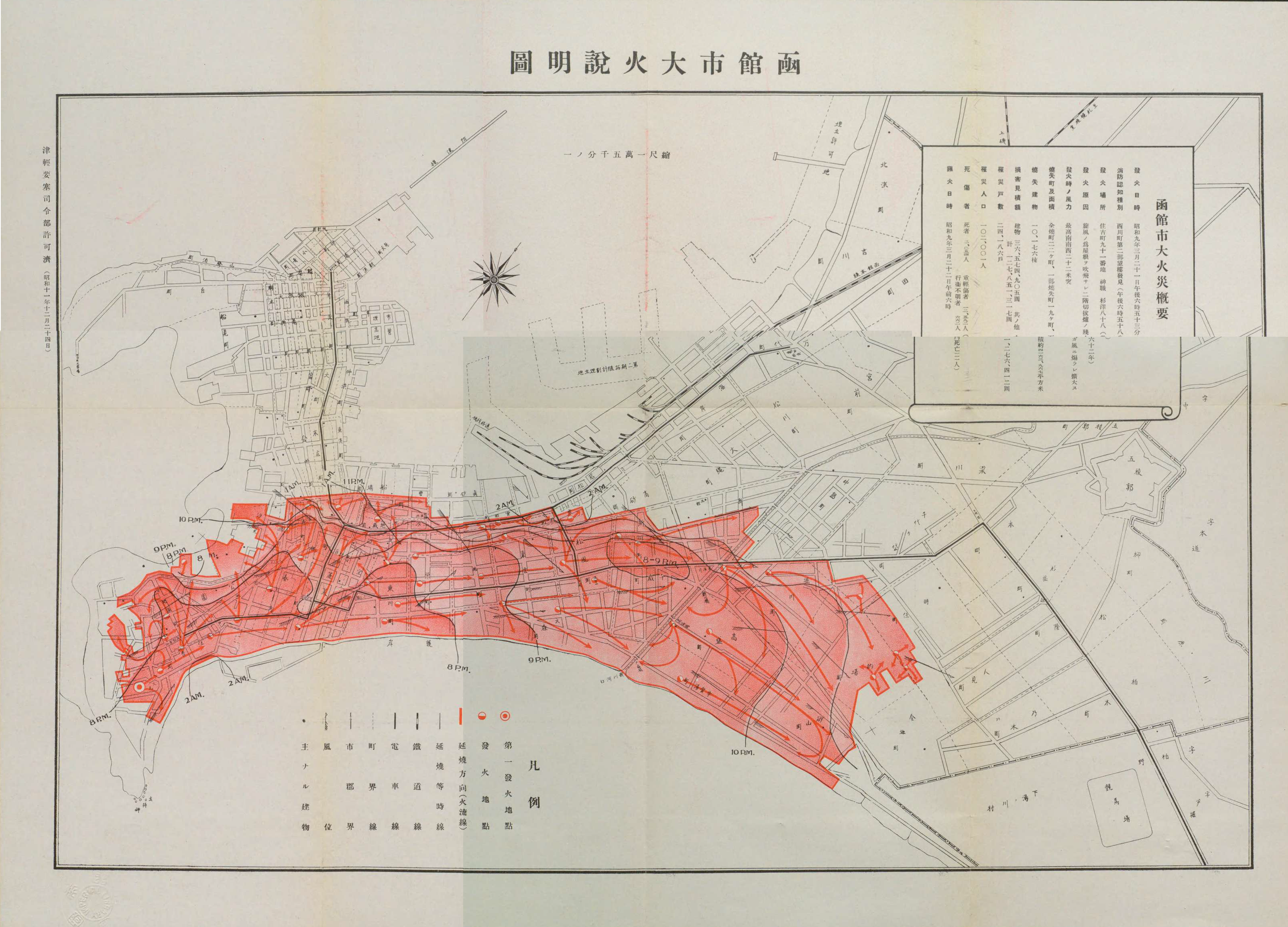
Burnt area by Fire

The Great Fire of Hakodate (Japanese: 函館大火) is a fire that broke out in Hakodate, Hokkaido in Japan on 21 March 1934. It is considered one of the worst city fires in Japan's history.

On 21 March 1934, a fire was started in a house located within the Sumiyoshi area, Hakodate. Over two days, burning debris fanned by strong winds set fire to the surrounding areas; including a local court, department store, school, and hospital. According to official documents, 2,166 people lost their lives, with 9,485 injured; 145,500 people were made homeless and 11,055 buildings lost. The fire destroyed around two-thirds of all buildings in Hakodate. This event also led to many residents leaving and subsequently depopulating the city.
