= Sennichi Department Store Building fire =

1972 building fire in Osaka, Japan

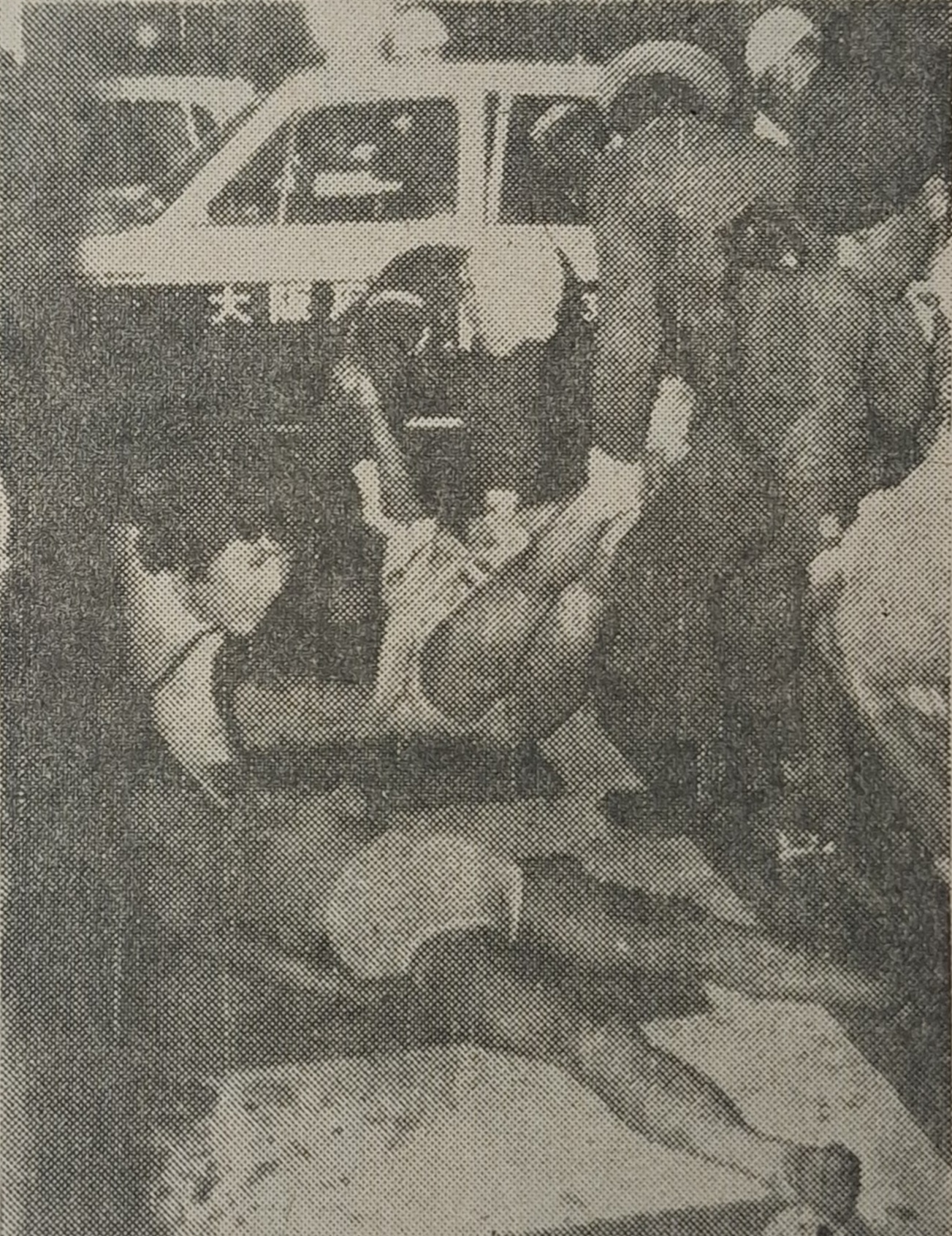
- Native name: 千日デパート火災
- Date: May 13, 1972
- Location: 1 Nambashinchi Sanbancho, Minami-ku, Osaka, Japan; 34°40′0.1″N 135°30′9.4″E
- Cause: Unknown
- Deaths: 118
- Missing: 81

The Sennichi Department Store Building fire occurred in Sennichimae, Minami-ku (now Chuo-ku), Osaka, Japan on May 13, 1972. The fire killed at least 118 people and injured another 78. It was the deadliest department store fire in Japan. The building that housed the department store also contained various other businesses, including a cabaret. All of the victims had been in the cabaret.

== Venue ==
At the time of the fire, there were shops directly run by the Sennichi Department Store in the first and second floors, supermarkets on the third and fourth floors, stores of the same prices on the fifth floor, game corners on the sixth floor, a cabaret called Playtown that was run by an affiliated company and a showroom "haunted house" and coffee house underground. It was a "conglomerate building" with different administrators. The sixth floor was partly under construction to become a bowling alley and the third floor was also under construction.

The building, which had previously been a Kabuki theater, had no fire sprinkler system. The existence of various different types of enterprises within one building was also a problem. The regulations and laws at the time of the construction of buildings collectively allowed these faults to occur.

== Fire ==
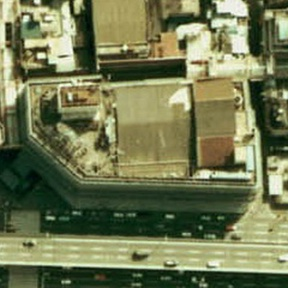
Sennichi Department Store Building aerial photograph

On Saturday night, May 13, 1972, the seventh-floor Playtown cabaret was filled to capacity with 181 patrons, as it was among the most popular night spots in Osaka. There were partitions in the fire exits, but they were not operational and the fire shutter, which was not automatic, was also out of order. The fire started at 22:27 on the third floor, where women's dresses were sold and several electricians were working. The cause of the fire was said to be a cigarette butt or a smouldering match left behind by a construction worker. Immediate attempts to extinguish the fire failed. Notification to the fire station was delayed by 13 minutes and the Osaka Municipal Fire Department was informed at 22:40 and started firefighting at 22:43. By that time, the third and fourth floors were fuming black smoke. Women's dresses for sale caught fire and helped spread the fire. The four floors from the second to the fifth were ablaze.

Toxic gases and smoke resulting from burning construction materials filled the stairway and caused the majority of the casualties. The cabaret's locked exits contributed to the death toll. When elevators ceased to function after the fire severed power cables, the situation turned into a mass panic. While the cabaret had safety measures in the form of canvas escape chutes, the equipment was not used properly, and evacuation directions were not given by the three cabaret workers familiar with the layout. Instead, the staff fled, utilizing a stairwell unknown to many customers. Eyewitnesses on the streets recounted that many victims had broken windows and climbed out and clung to the window ledges before firefighters arrived, with many falling to their deaths.

Responding firefighters who entered the cabaret found that many of the victims may have not had enough time to react to the fire, discovering individuals without thermal burns and positioned as they were engaging in daily activities. They found a deceased victim sitting on a sofa holding a glass of whisky, and another on the stage still holding onto the microphone. About 49 victims were evacuated via ladders, but many deaths were attributed to the misuse of the two tubular canvas escape chutes.

== Victims ==
Twenty-four people attempted to escape by jumping from windows, and about 20 people died while attempting to use an emergency escape chute that collapsed. Ninety-six were found dead inside the cabaret. The fire was brought under control the next day and finally extinguished on the third day. Of the dead, 93 suffered carbon monoxide poisoning, three died from compression injuries in the chest and abdomen (meaning that they were probably trampled to death) and about 20 died from jumping.

About 49 people had been rescued unhurt and that 42 others were injured. Of the injured, 27 were firemen.

== Legal ==
Two people from the Sennichi Department Store and two people from the Playtown cabaret were indicted for occupational negligence resulting in fire and casualties. On November 29, 1990, the remaining three persons were finally found guilty. A department administrator was sentenced to imprisonment for two years and six months with suspension of three years; two persons involved with the cabaret were sentenced to one year and six months with suspension of two years. One of the department store personnel died during the trial.

== Aftermath ==
After the fire and the 1973 Taiyo Department Store fire, both of which caused many casualties, amendments were made to construction and fire regulations to prevent the possibility of smoke hindering people who are trying to escape a fire.

The building was demolished and another store, a branch of Bic Camera, was built in its place. However, many ghost stories about the victims of the fire seen at the site of the disaster have arisen.
