= Foreign settlement =

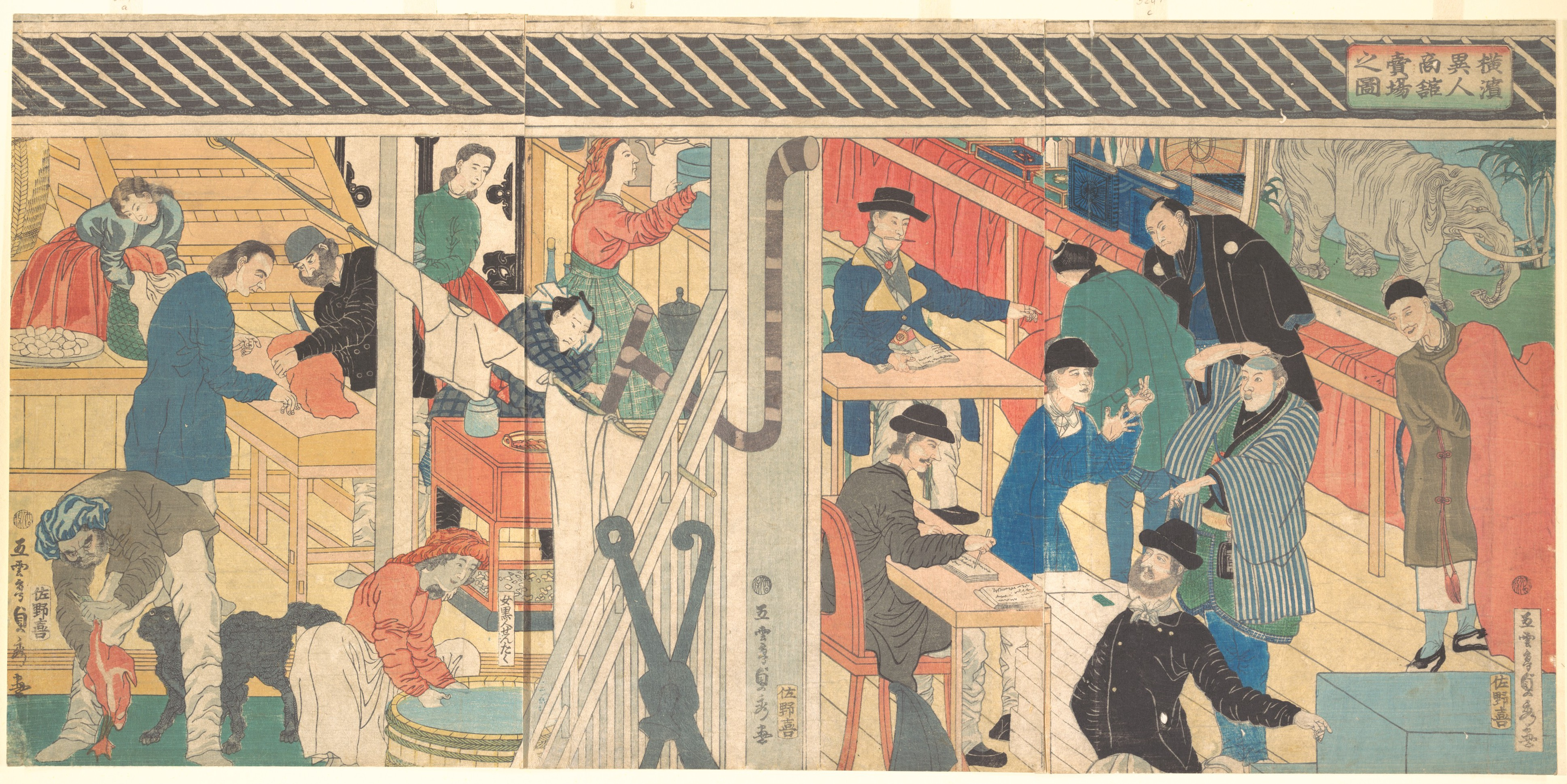
Foreign traders in the Yokohama foreign settlement

A foreign settlement (Japanese: 外国人居留地, pronounced "Gaikokujin kyoryūchi") was a special area in a treaty port, designated by the Japanese government in the second half of the nineteenth century, to allow foreigners to live and work.

After the visits of Commodore Perry in 1853 and 1854, Japan entered a period of rapid social and economic transition from a closed, feudalistic society to a more open, modern trading nation state. Japan first opened two ports to allow foreign trade, Shimoda and Hakodate after the signing the Convention of Kanagawa with the United States in 1854. It then designated five more treaty ports in 1858 with the signing of the Treaty of Amity and Commerce., Yokohama, Kobe, Nagasaki, Osaka, and Niigata.

Trade agreements signed with the United States were swiftly followed by similar ones with Britain, the Netherlands, Russia and France. The ports permitted legal extraterritoriality for citizens of the treaty nations.

Before the system of treaty port concessions ended in 1899 seven foreign settlements had been established in Japan. They were, from north to south:

- Hakodate foreign settlement in Hakodate, Hokkaido
- Niigata foreign settlement in Niigata, Niigata
- Tsukiji foreign settlement in Tsukiji, Chūō-ku, Tokyo
- Yokohama foreign settlement in the Kannai and Yamate districts of Naka-ku, Yokohama, Kanagawa
- Kawaguchi foreign settlement in Kawaguchi, Nishi-ku, Osaka
- Kobe foreign settlement in Kobe, Hyōgo
- Nagasaki foreign settlement in Oura, Nagasaki, Nagasaki

== See also ==
- Treaty ports
- Dejima, Nagasaki, for the Dutch and Chinese traders, was the predecessor to the Nagasaki foreign settlement
