= Hakodate Junior College =

Coordinates: 41°47′15.4″N 140°48′28″E

- 函館短期大学
- Type: Private
- Established: 1953
- Location: Hakodate, Hokkaidō, Hokkaidō, Japan
- Website: www.hakodate-jc.ac.jp

Hakodate Junior College (函館短期大学, Hakodate Tanki Daigaku) is a private junior college in the city of Hakodate, Hokkaidō, Japan.

It was established in 1953. It currently consists of two departments. The campus is across the street from Hakodate University.
