= Hakodate La Salle Junior High School & Senior High School =

Coordinates: 41.7885°N 140.7904°E

- 函館ラ・サール中学校・高等学校
- Hakodate, Hokkaido, Japan

Information
- Type: Private
- Established: 1960
- Headmaster: Br. Fermin Martinez
- Gender: Boys

Hakodate La Salle Junior High School & Senior High School (函館ラ・サール中学校・高等学校) is a combined junior and senior high school in Hakodate, Hokkaido, Japan.

== History ==
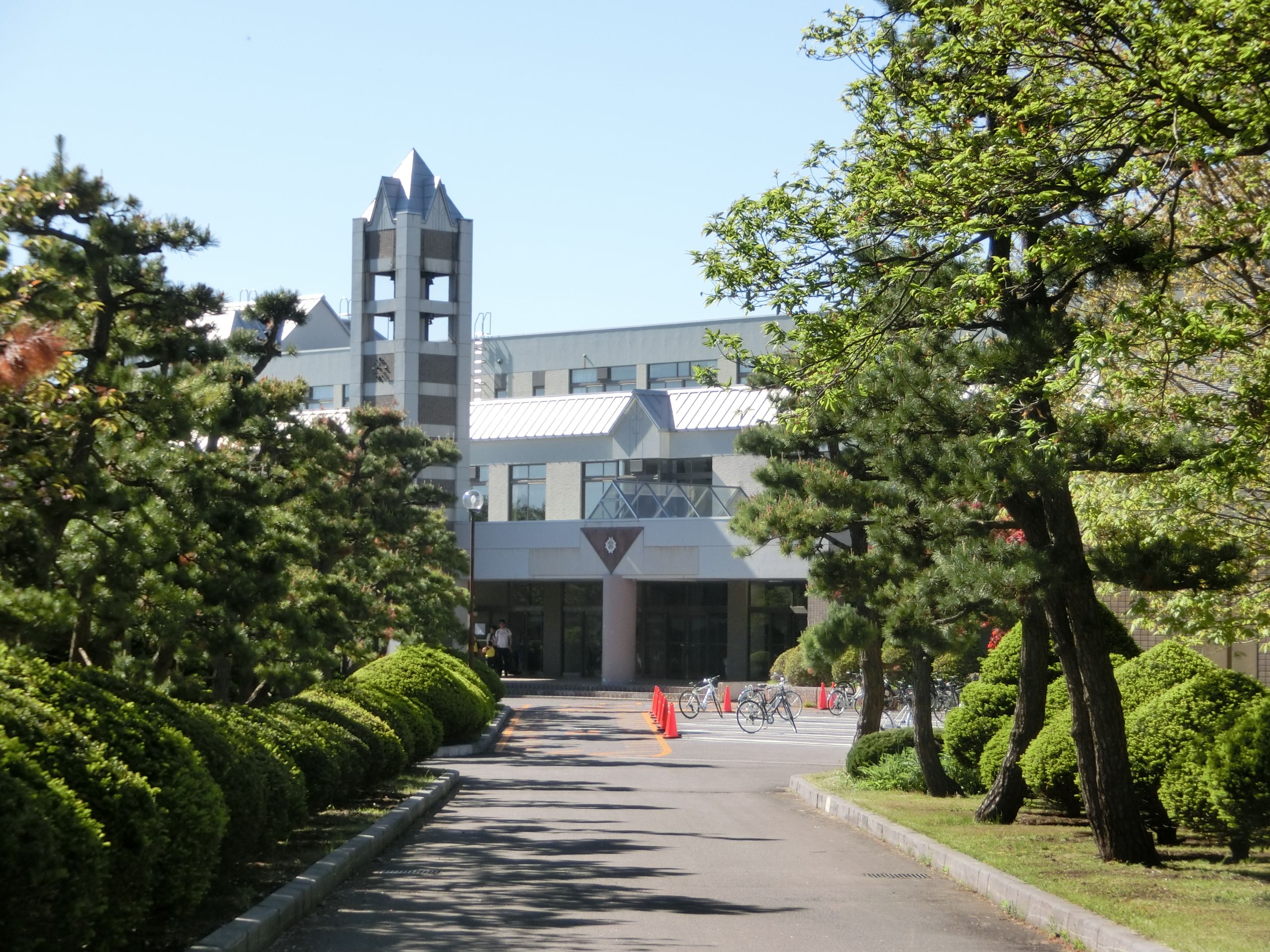
Hakodate La Salle Junior High School & Senior High School

Hakodate La Salle Senior High School was established in Hakodate in 1960. Hakodate La Salle Junior High School was established in 1999.

== Notable alumni ==
- Masanori Nishio, politician
- Tomohiro Ishikawa, politician
- Kazuhito Hashimoto, chemist
- Shinbo Nomura, mangaka
- Taio Kanai, athlete
- Morio Agata, singer
