= Airtransse =

Airline

airtransse
IATA	ICAO	Call sign
-	TSQ	AIRTRA
- Founded: 1997
- Ceased operations: 2008
- Hubs: Hakodate Airport
- Website: http://www.airtransse.com/

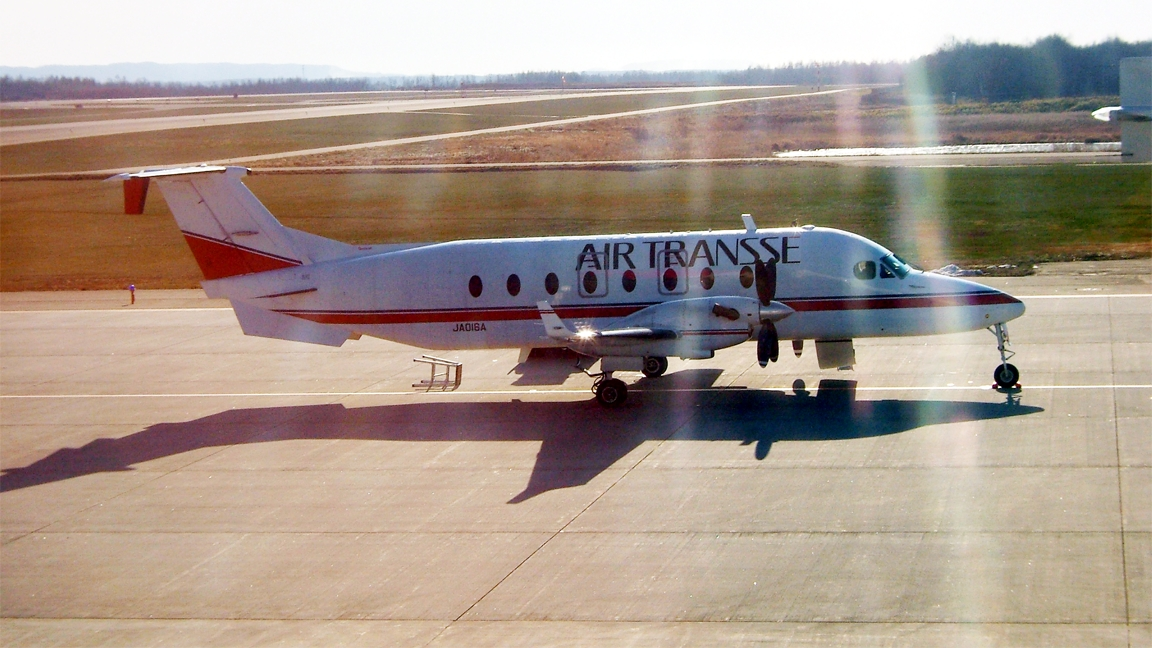
airtransse Beechcraft 1900

airtransse (株式会社エアトランセ, Kabushiki-gaisha Eatoranse) was an airline headquartered in the Nichinan Trading Building (日南貿易ビル, Nichinan Bōeki Biru) Shinjuku, Tokyo, Japan. It operated scheduled passenger services. Its main base was Hakodate Airport in Hakodate, with a hub at New Chitose Airport; both are in Hokkaido.

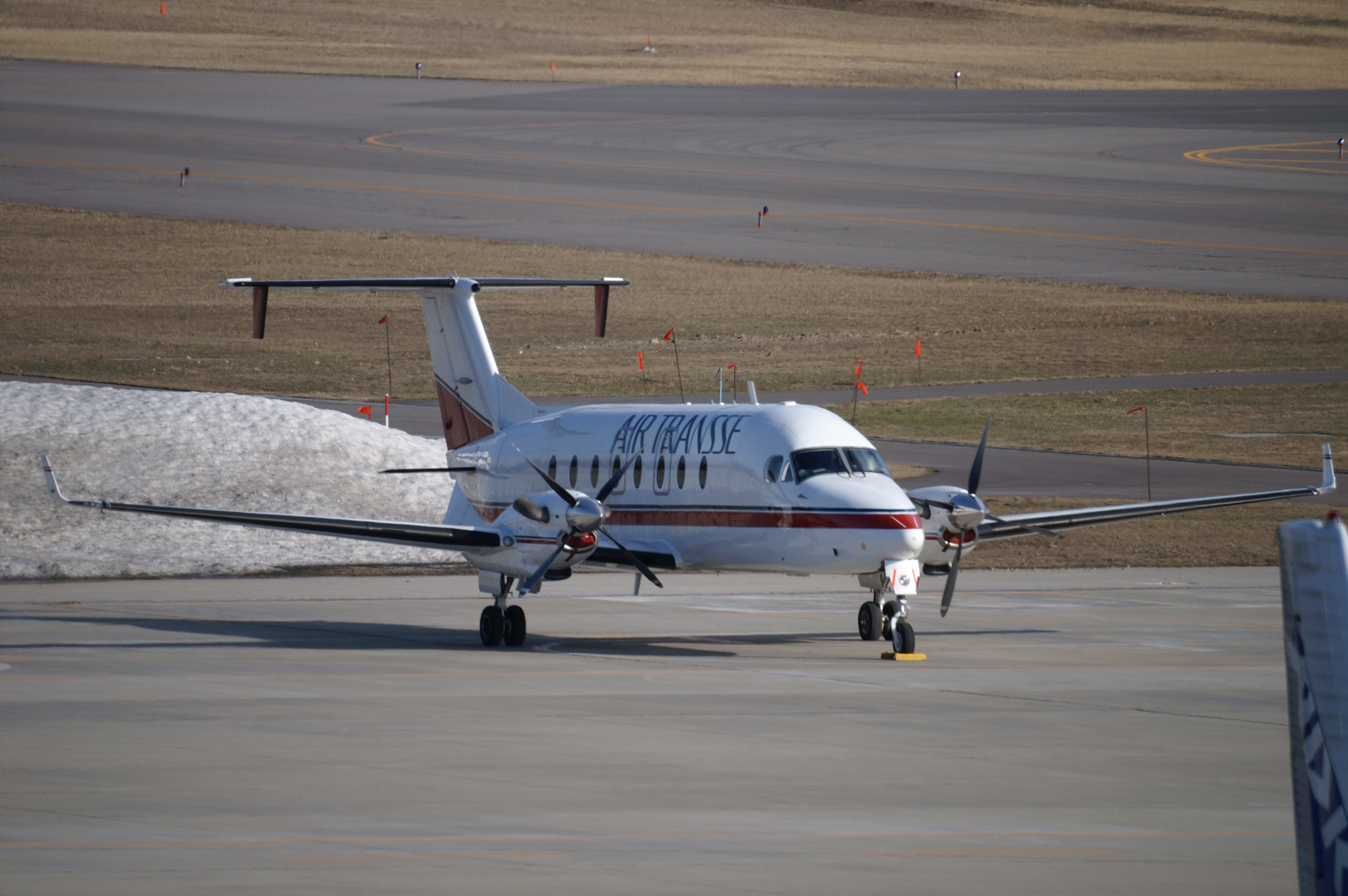
TSQ Beech1900D (JA016A)

== History ==
Airtransse was a Japanese regional airline that operated from 2005 to 2008. Headquartered in the Nichinan Trading Building in Shinjuku, Tokyo, the airline's main base was Hakodate Airport, with a hub at New Chitose Airport, both located in Hokkaido. Originally established in 1997 as Air Shenpix, the airline rebranded to Airtransse in December 2004 and commenced operations on March 13, 2005. The airline was owned by Hideo Sawada as of 2012.

== Destinations ==
Service between Hakodate and Ōzora began April 1, 2006.

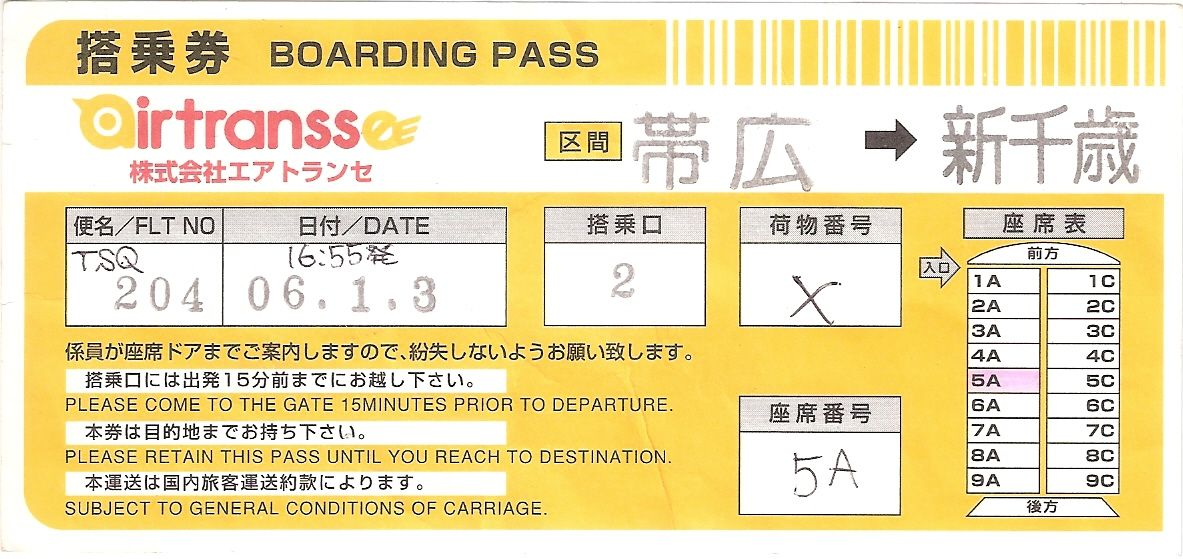
Airtransse Boardingpass01

== Fleet ==
As of March 2007 the airline fleet included:

- 3 Raytheon Beech 1900D Airliner

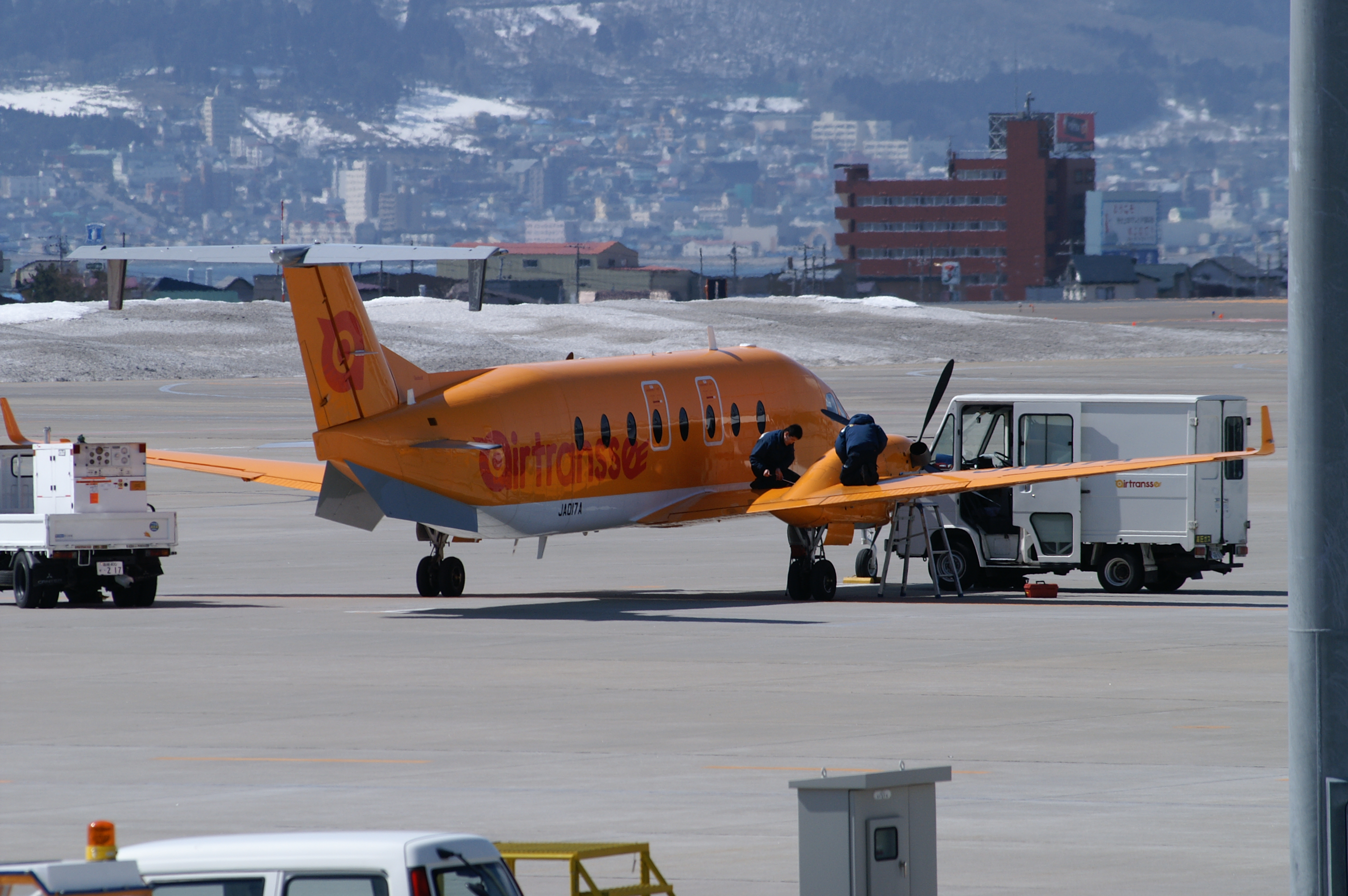
TSQ Beech1900D (JA017A)
