= Port of Hakodate =

Coordinates: 41.8072°N 140.7106°E

Hakodate
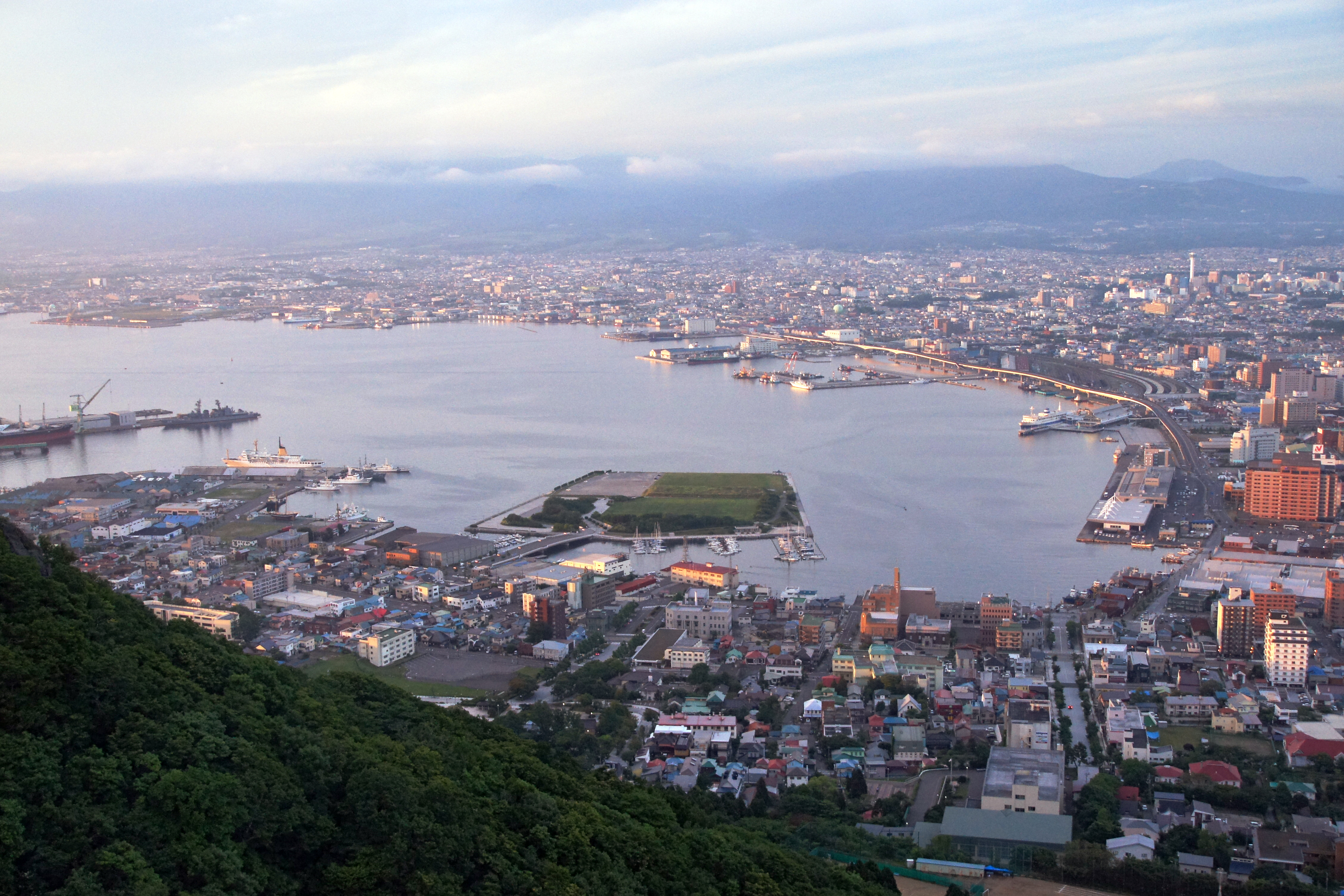
- Port of Hakodate

- Location in Japan

Location
- Country: Japan
- Location: Hokkaido
- UN/LOCODE: JPHKD

Details
- No. of berths: 11
- Draft depth: 14.5 metres (48 ft)

Statistics
- Website https://www.city.hakodate.hokkaido.jp/soshiki/kouwan_dept/

The Port of Hakodate (函館港, Hakodate-kō) is one of the main ports in northern Japan, located in Hakodate, on the northern island of Hokkaido.

The port was damaged in the March 2011 earthquake.
