= National Institute of Technology, Hakodate College =

Education organization in Hakodate, Japan

- 函館工業高等専門学校
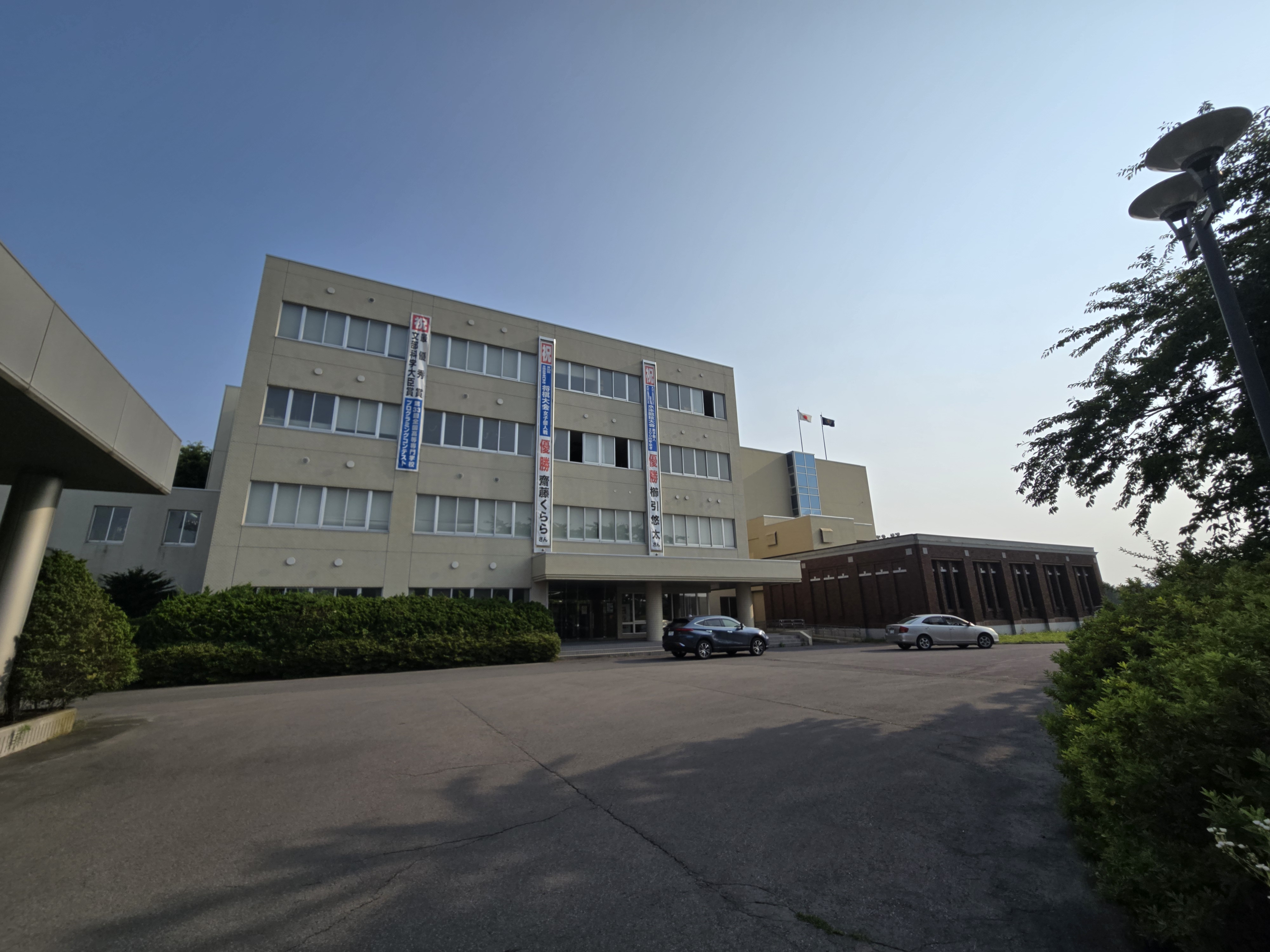

Location
- Hokkaido; Hakodate, Japan, Hokkaido, 042-8501
- Coordinates: 41.783°N 140.802°E

Information
- Other name: 函館高専
- School type: National Institute of Technology (KOSEN)
- Motto: 汝が夢を持て 大志を抱け 力強かれ (Thou shall dream, aspire and be strong)
- Established: 1962
- Founder: 国立高等専門学校機構
- President: Megumi ABE (阿部恵)
- Age: 15+
- Classes: 25
- Average class size: 40
- Language: Japanese and English
- Campus size: 124,901m^{2}
- Sports: Molkky
- Website: https://www.hakodate-ct.ac.jp/

The National Institute of Technology, Hakodate College (函館工業高等専門学校, Hakodate Kōgyōkōtōsenmongakkō) is a national college of technology in Hakodate, Japan. Also known as NIT, Hakodate College or 函館高専 (Hakodate Kōsen).

== Overview ==
NIT, Hakodate College is located on the hill of Tokuracho in Hakodate, close to Hakodate Airport.

It was established as one of the first-term national institutes of technology (KOSEN). Furthermore, it is the only national institute of technology in the southern part of Hokkaido.

Over 1,000 students are enrolled in the regular courses (5 years) or the advanced courses (2 years).

The school and companies in the Hakodate area collaborate on technology to create original brand craft beers, contributing to the promotion of Hakodate's culture. Additionally, Hakodate is set to host the Mölkky World Championship in August 2024.

== Location ==
- 〒042-8501 14-1, Tokuracho, Hakodate, Hokkaido, Japan
- Closest train station: Yunokawa (湯の川, Hakodate Transportation Bureau)
- Closest bus stop: Hakodate Kosen-mae (函館高専前, Hakodate Bus)

== School motto, education purpose and goal ==
- School Motto: 汝が夢を持て 大志を抱け 力強かれ (Thou shall dream, aspire and be strong)
- Education Purpose: To foster creative individuals with practical and specialized knowledge and skills required for engineers, while striving to improve the level of practical research, and to promote balanced development as the only comprehensive technical higher education institution in the southern part of Hokkaido.
- Education Goal
  1. To cultivate engineers with creativity and execution skills.
  2. To cultivate engineers with basic knowledge of specialized technologies.
  3. To cultivate engineers who can utilize information technology.
  4. To cultivate engineers who understand and act in accordance with social history, culture, and engineering ethics.
  5. To cultivate engineers with multifaceted communication skills.
  6. To cultivate engineers with design skills for problem-solving.

== Facilities ==
=== Library ===
The library has about 80,000 books and is generally open to the public. It mainly houses books on engineering.

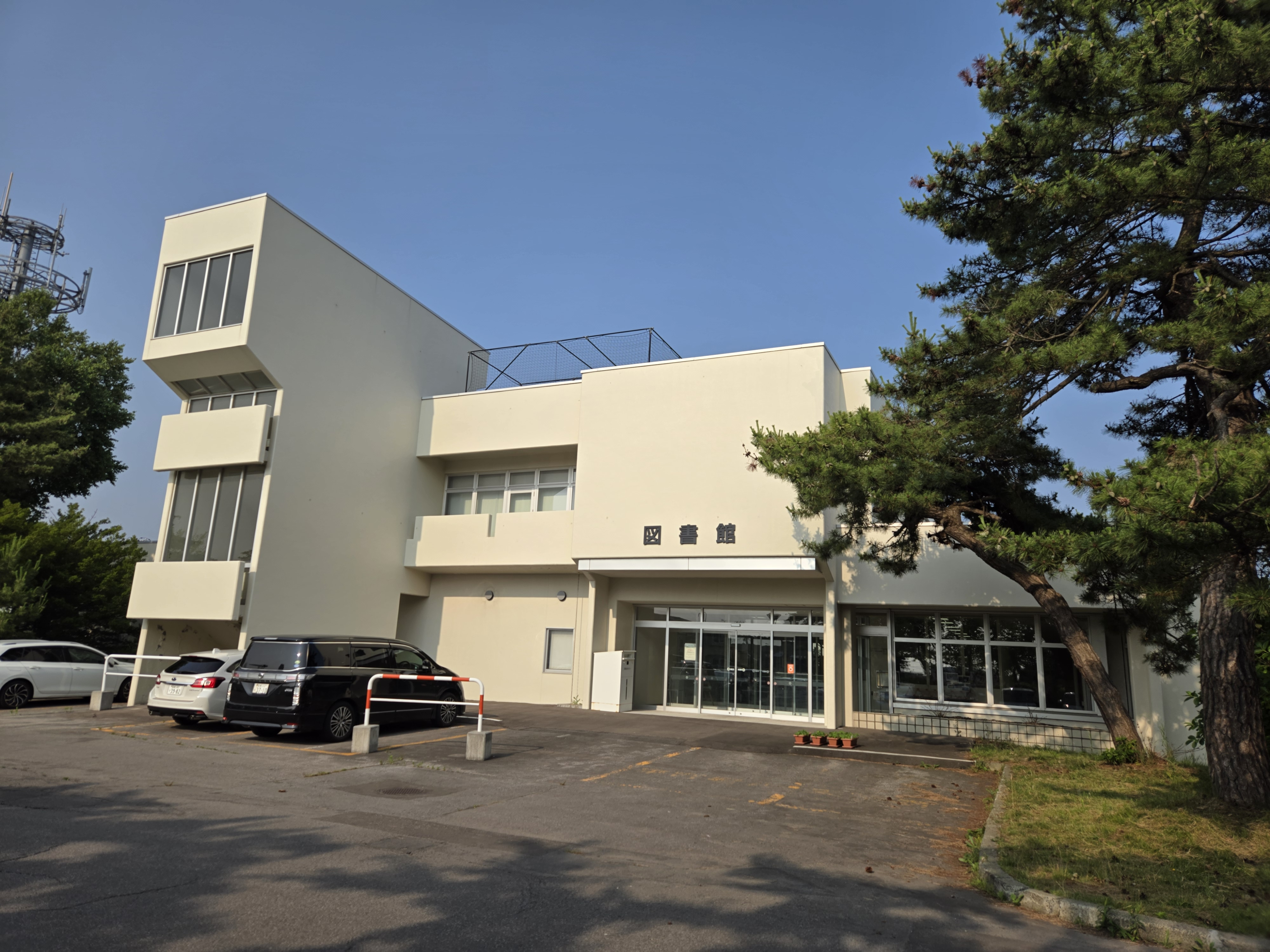
Library

=== Cafeteria ===
A convenience store and a dining hall are located here. One can enjoy a low-cost meal and purchase stationery, snacks, and drinks.

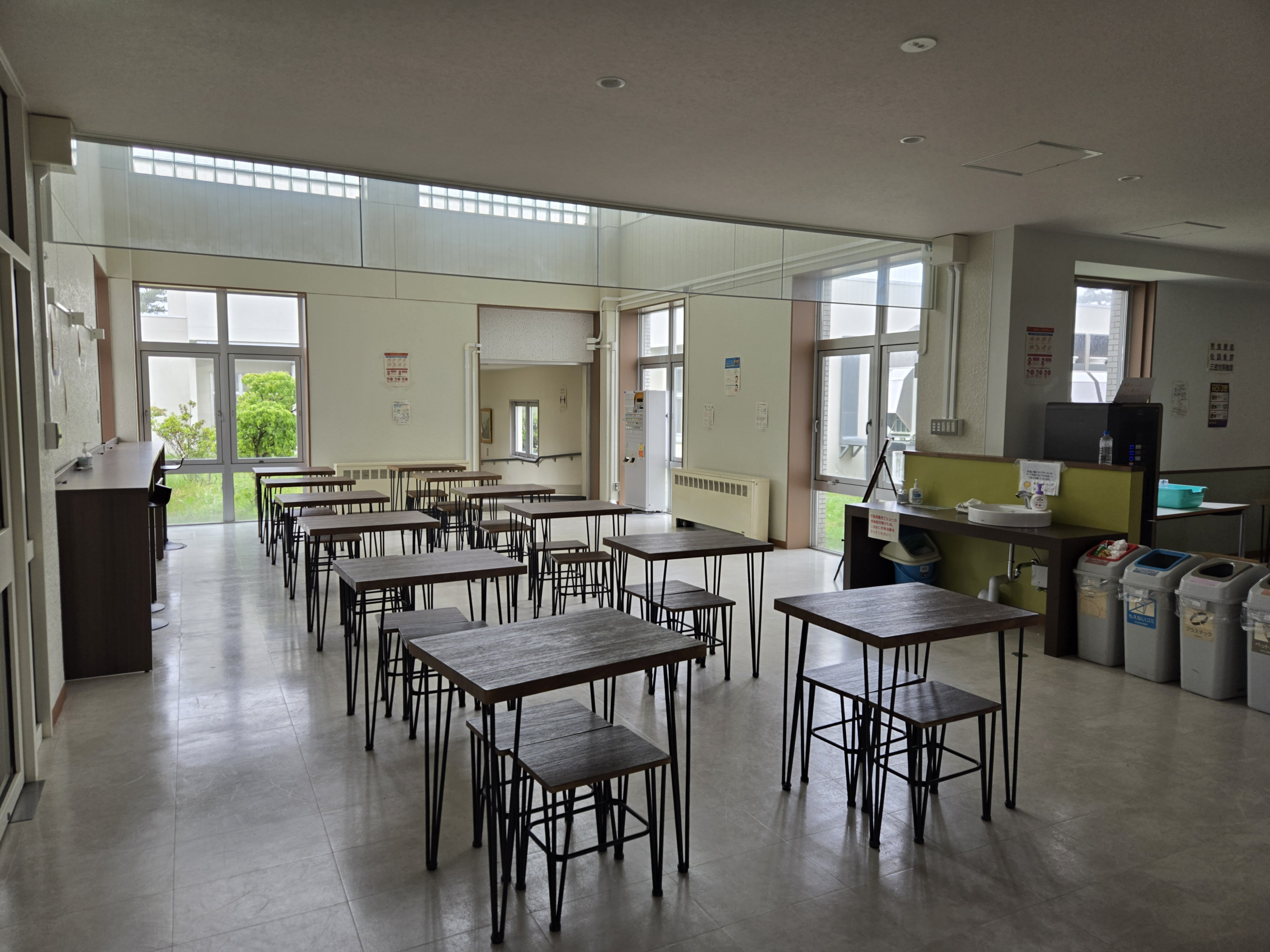
Cafeteria

=== Advanced-course building and KOSEN commons center ===
Within this building, advanced-course students attend more advanced lectures.

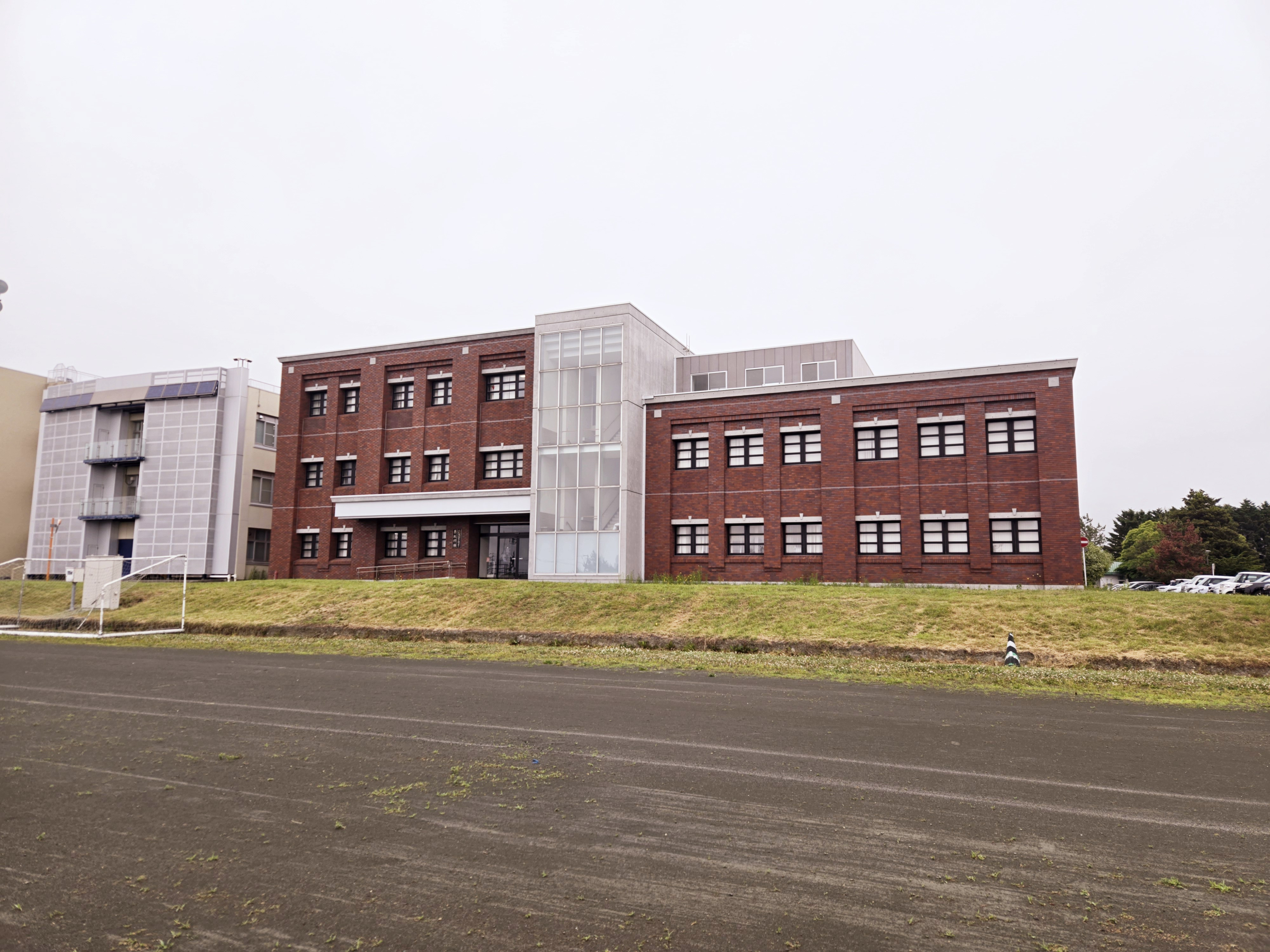
Advanced-course building

=== Outdoor facilities ===
NIT, Hakodate College is well-equipped with outdoor facilities for student activities. This section highlights some of these facilities.

- Gym 1
- Gym 2
- Material arts gym
- Sports ground 1
- Sports ground 2
- Baseball field
- Tennis court
- Golf range
- Archery hall
- Swimming pool
- Syunchōryō Dormitory

== Academic Departments ==
=== Regular courses (5 years) ===
- Department of Production Systems Engineering (生産システム工学科, Seisan System Kōgakuka)
  - Mechanical Systems Course (機械コース, Kikai Course)
  - Electrical and Electronic Systems Course (電気電子コース, Denkidenshi Course)
  - Information Systems Course (情報コース, Jōhō Course)
- Department of Materials and Environmental Engineering (物質環境工学科, Busshitsukankyō Kōgakuka)
- Department of Civil Engineering (社会基盤工学科, Syakaikiban Kōgakuka)

=== Advanced courses (2 years) ===
- Advanced Course of Production Systems Engineering (生産システム工学専攻, Seisan System Kōgaku Senkō)
- Advanced Course of Materials and Environmental Engineering (物質環境工学専攻, Busshitsukankyō Kōgaku Senkō)
- Advanced Course of Civil Engineering (社会基盤工学専攻, Syakaikiban Kōgaku Senkō)
