= Hakodate foreign settlement =

Historic neighborhood in Hakodate, Japan

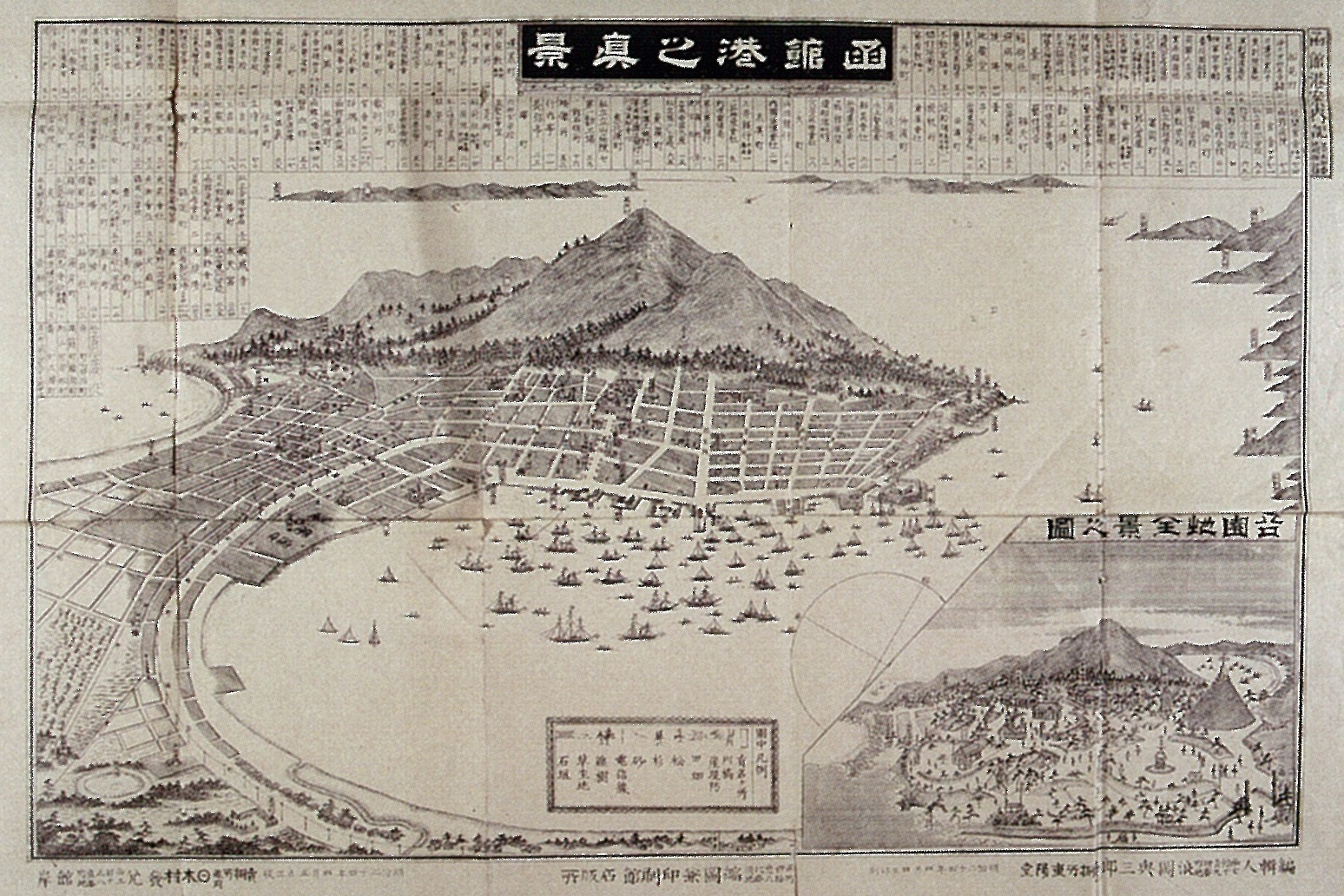
Map of Hakodate in 1891

The Hakodate foreign settlement (函館外国人居留地, Hako-kan gaikokujin kyoryūchi) was a collection of foreign settlement sites scattered across Hakodate. A warehouse, Catholic church, and Orthodox church remain from the settlement era.

== History ==
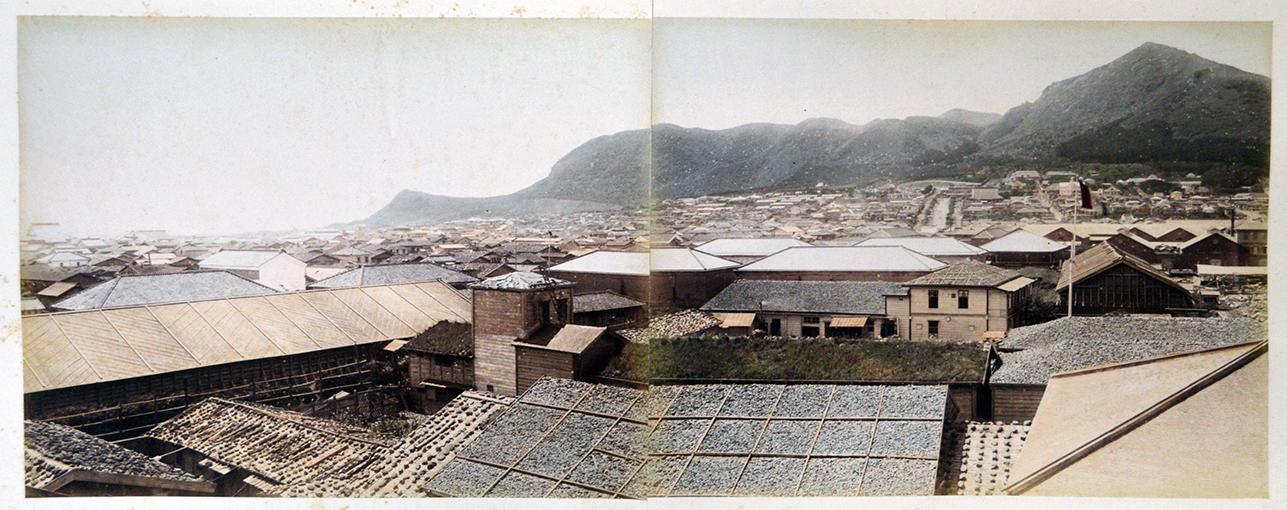
A view of the Hakodate Foreign Settlement, c. 1880

The Ansei Treaties of 1858 decided that Hakodate would be opened (allowed foreigners to do business) along with Osaka, Tokyo, Yokohama, Niigata, Kobe, and Nagasaki. Foreigners had especially looked favourably upon Hakodate; as Commodore Perry forced the Tokugawas' hand in revoking the sakoku policy, Russians had similarly visited Hakodate years before. The Treaty of Shimoda, signed a year before the Ansei Treaties, had provided Americans and Russians with trade settlements in Hakodate; thus, Hakodate had more extensive contact with foreigners and their interests than most cities that were designated to have a foreign settlement within them.

Unlike the more defined borders of the other foreign settlements, due to the large amount of readily available land, the Hakodate magistrate opened up land whenever available to meet the demands of foreign settlers. The main site of foreign settlement in Hakodate was Omachi (大町), now present day Nakahama-cho (仲浜町). The site was constructed in 1860, consisting of about 1730 tsubo (approximately 0.6 hectares) in 1878. The Jizo (地蔵) foreign settlement was also opened sometime later, though few foreigners were interested in the area and the land remained largely barren.

Often, foreigners lived with local people in mixed areas called zakkyochi (雑居地), a feature unseen in other foreign settlements. The population of the foreign settlement, at its height, consisted of 72 people: 35 Chinese, 20 British, 6 French, 4 Russians, 3 Americans, 2 Danes and 2 Germans. Due to the small foreign population, there was no official governance of the settlement.

From 1878 to 1879, a large fire devastated the Hakodate urban area, including portions of the foreign settlement as well.

== Legacy ==
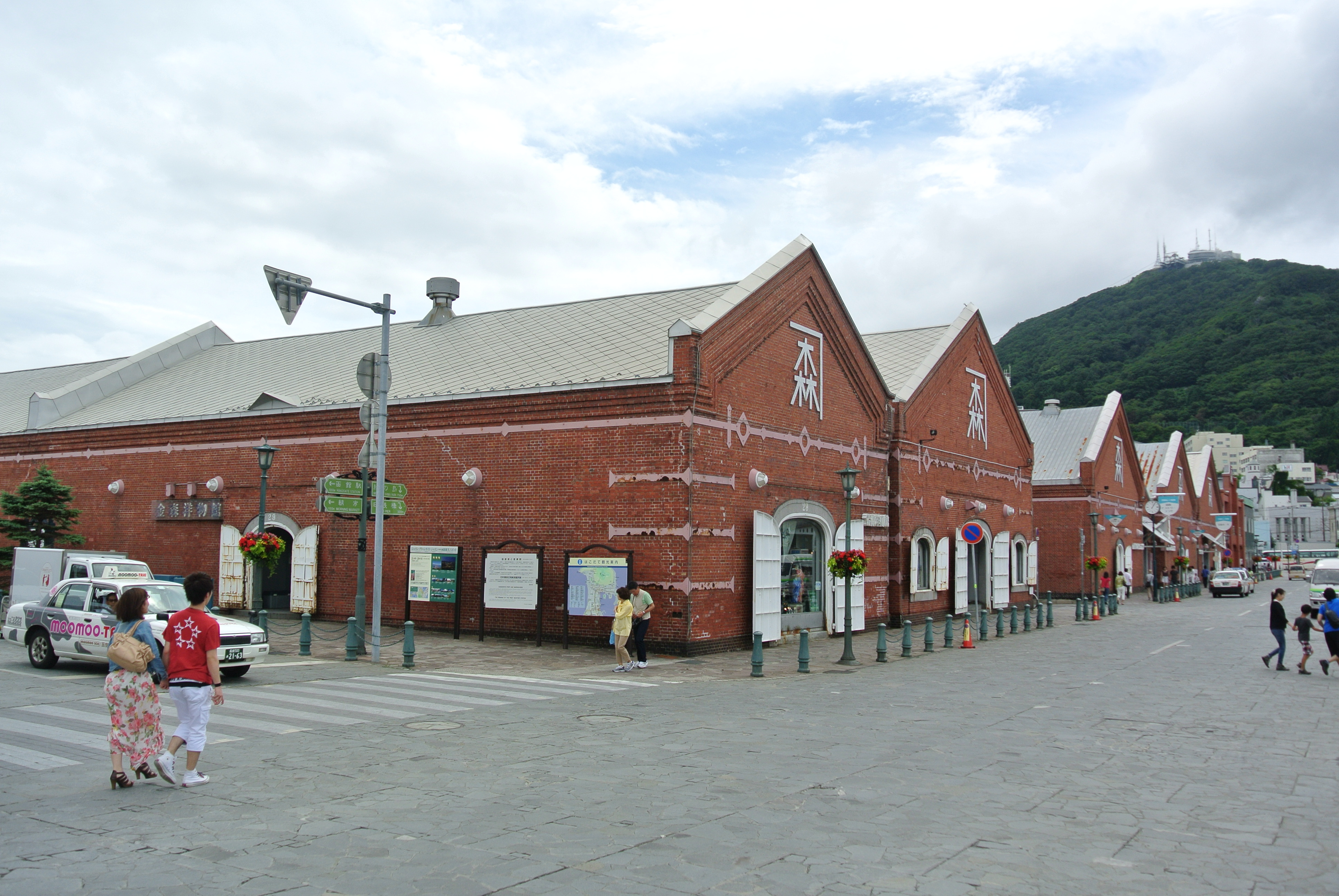
The Kanemori red brick warehouses, renovations of the original warehouses built within the foreign settlement in 1869

Many of the stores and buildings built by the foreigners, while nonexistent today, have influenced some of Hakodate's architecture: there are many quasi-Western buildings built by local Japanese, especially clustered around the former settlements, to this day. Some buildings built in this style are the Old Public Hall of Hakodate Ward (旧函館区公会堂), Former Hakodate Branch Office of Hokkaido (旧北海道庁函館支庁庁舎), and the Soma Co. Headquarters (相馬株式会社社屋). These buildings generally have a traditional style first floor and a Western second floor, have vertical decorated windows, a ledge between floors, and eaves on the roof.

Karl Weidl-Raymon (1894-1987), a Bohemian immigrant that lived in the settlement, founded a sausage company in Hakodate. His Thuringer sausages are a Hakodate specialty.

== See also ==
- Foreign settlement
