= Hokkaido Hakodate Chubu High School =

High school in Hakodate, Hokkaidō, Japan

Coordinates: 41.7830°N 140.7526°E

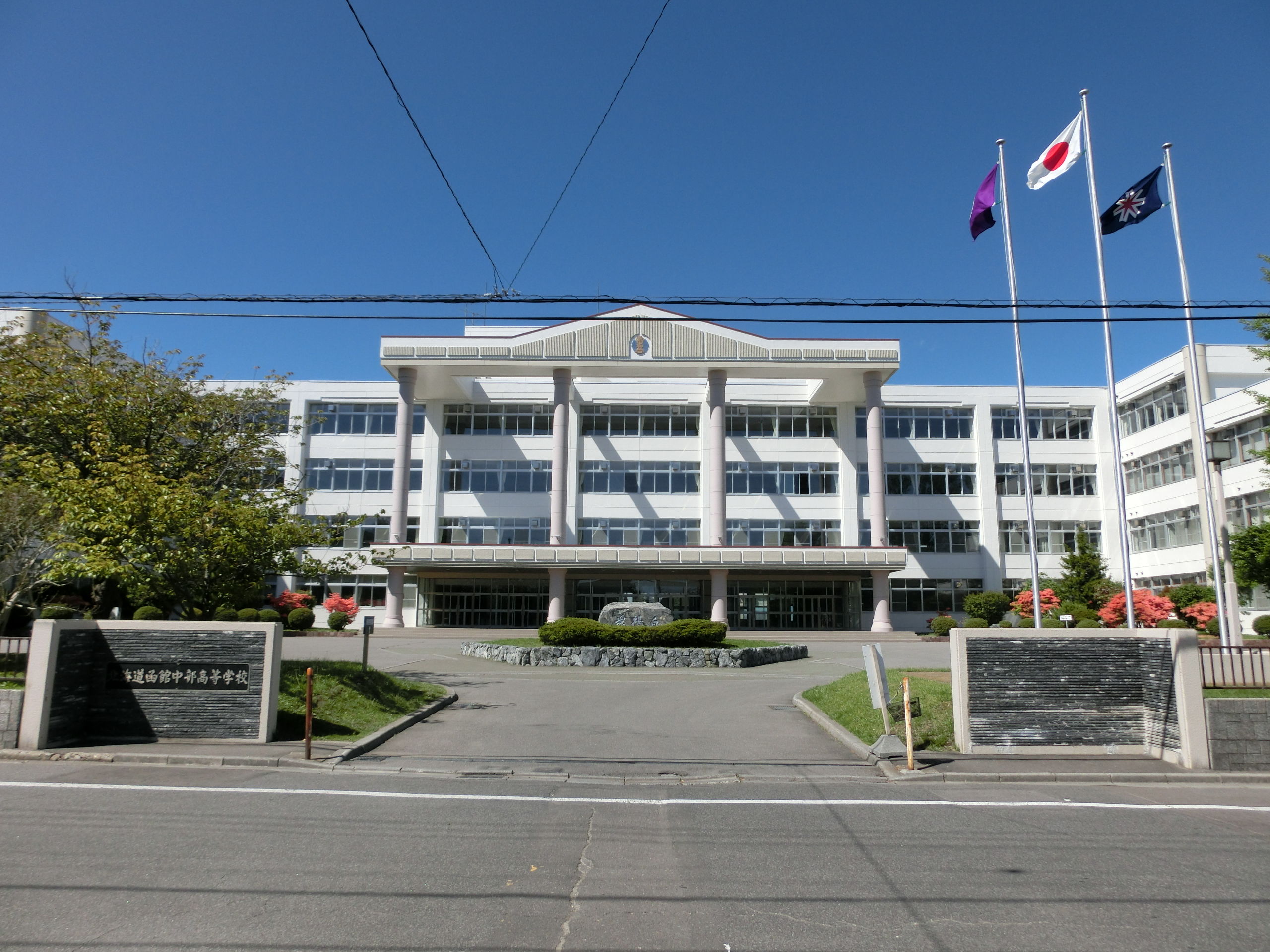
Hokkaido Hakodate Chubu High School

Hokkaido Hakodate Chubu High School (北海道函館中部高等学校, Hokkaidō Hakodate Chūbu Kōtō Gakkō) is a high school in Hakodate, Hokkaidō, Japan, founded in 1895. Hokkaido Hakodate Chubu High School is one of the high schools administered by Hokkaido.

The school is operated by the Hokkaido Prefectural Board of Education.

== Notable alumni ==
- Naoki Yamamoto (山本 直樹), manga artist
- Masahiro Kobayashi (小林 正寛), actor
