= Hakodate =

Hakodate 函館市
- Core city
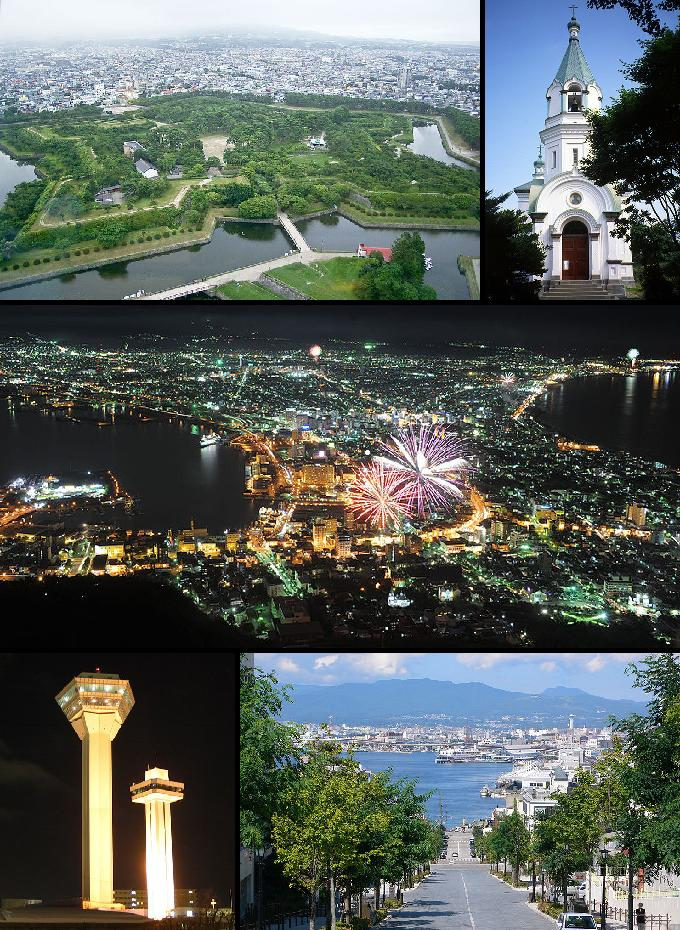
- Clockwise from the top: Goryokaku, Hakodate Orthodox Church, Night View from Mount Hakodate, Hachiman-Zaka and Hakodate Port, Goryokaku Tower

- Flag Seal
- Interactive map of Hakodate
- Location within Japan
- Coordinates: 41°46′07″N 140°43′44″E
- Country: Japan
- Region: Hokkaido
- Prefecture: Hokkaido (Oshima Subprefecture)
- Established: 1454
- Founder: Kōno Kaganokami Masamichi

Government
  - Mayor: Jun Ōizumi (since April 2023)

Area
  - Total: 677.86 km^{2} (261.72 sq mi)
- Elevation: 15 m (49 ft)

Population (January 31, 2024)
  - Total: 239,813
  - Density: 353.78/km^{2} (916.28/sq mi)
- Time zone: UTC+9 (Japan Standard Time)
- Phone number: 0138-21-3111
- Address: 4-13 Shinonome-chō, Hakodate-shi, Hokkaidō; 040-8666
- Climate: Cfa
- Website: www.city.hakodate.hokkaido.jp
- Symbols
- Bird: Varied tit
- Fish: Squid
- Flower: Azalea
- Tree: Japanese yew

Hakodate (函館市, Hakodate-shi; Japanese pronunciation: [ha.ko.da.te, ha.ko.da.teꜜ.ɕi]) is a city and port located in Oshima Subprefecture, Hokkaido, Japan. It is the capital city of Oshima Subprefecture. As of January 31, 2024, the city had an estimated population of 239,813 with 138,807 households, and a population density of 354 inhabitants per square kilometre (920/sq mi). The total area is 677.86 square kilometres (261.72 sq mi). The city is the third largest in Hokkaido after Sapporo and Asahikawa.

== History ==
Hakodate was Japan's first city whose port was opened to foreign trade in 1854, as a result of Convention of Kanagawa, and used to be the most important port in northern Japan. The city was the biggest city in Hokkaido before the Great Fire of Hakodate in 1934.

=== Pre–Meiji Restoration ===
Hakodate (like other parts of around Hokkaido) was originally populated by the Ainu. The name "Hakodate" may have originated from an Ainu word, hak-casi ('shallow fort'). Another possibility is that it means 'box' or 'building' in Japanese which refers to the castle built by the Kono (Kano) clan in the fifteenth century.

Hakodate was founded in 1454, when Kono Kaganokami Masamichi constructed a large manor house in the fishing village of Usukeshi, the word for bay in Ainu.

After his death, Masamichi's son, Kono Suemichi, and family were driven out of Hakodate into nearby Kameda during the Ainu rebellion in 1512 and little history was recorded for the area during the next 100 years. There was constant low-level conflict in the Oshima peninsula at the time with the Ainu, as armed merchants, like the Kono family, established bases to control trade in the region. This conflict culminated in an uprising from 1669 to 1672, led by Ainu warrior Shakushain after which the Ainu in the region were suppressed.

Hakodate flourished during the Hoei period (1704–11), and many new temples were founded in the area. The town's fortunes received a further boost in 1741 when the Matsumae clan, which had been granted nearby areas on the Oshima Peninsula as a march fief, moved its Kameda magistracy to Masamichi's house in Hakodate.

In 1779, the Tokugawa shogunate took direct control over Hakodate, which triggered rapid development in the area. Merchant Takadaya Kahei, who is honoured as the founder of Hakodate port, set up trading operations, which included opening the northern Etorofu sea route to the Kuril island fisheries. He is credited with turning Hakodate from a trading outpost into a thriving city. A Hakodate magistracy was established in 1802. By 1807, the power of the Tokugawa government extended to the entire region. However, in 1821, the central government relaxed their control of the area and restored the Matsumae clan to the full powers they had before.

Gallery

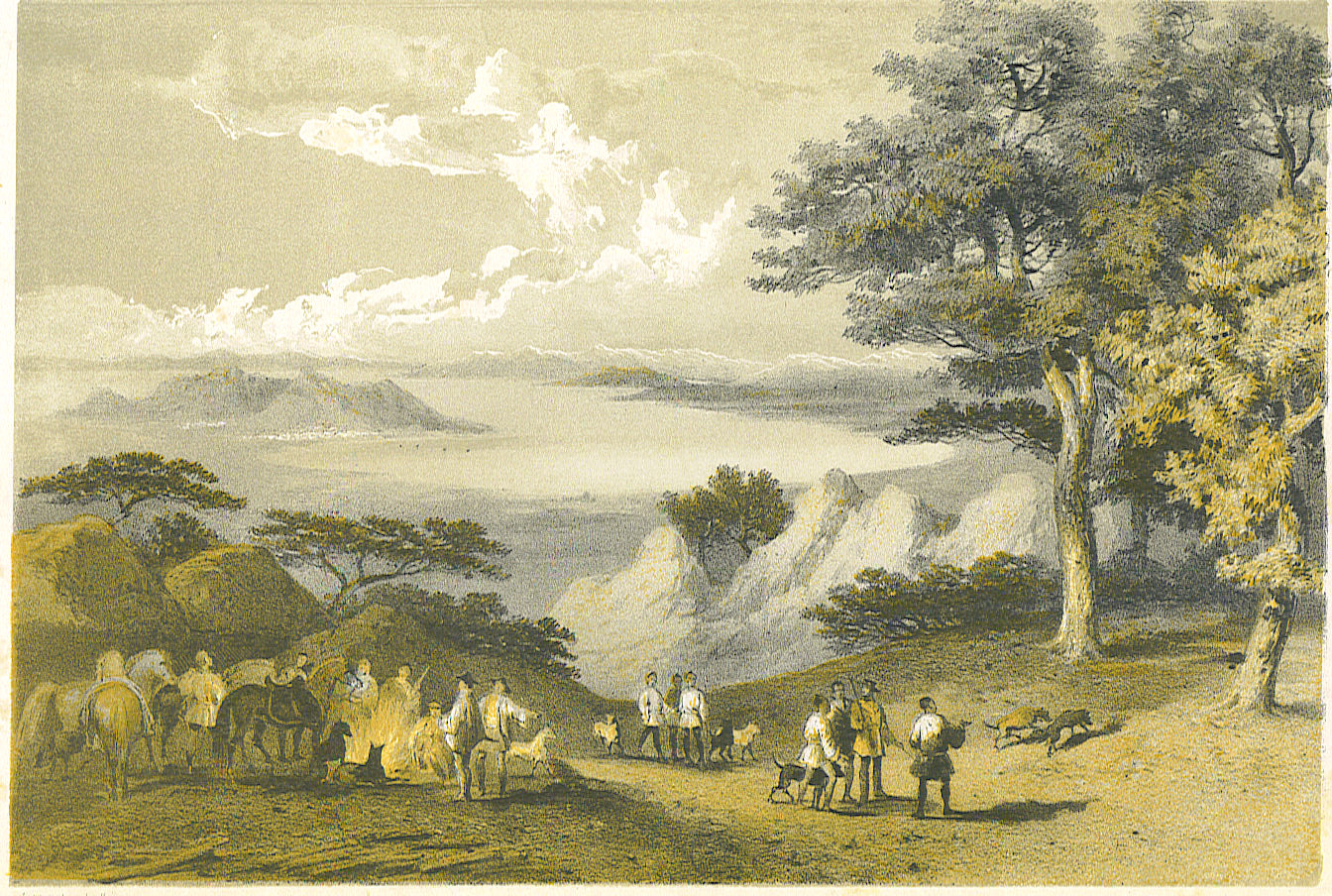
Lithograph entitled "View of Hakodate from Snow Peak" looking towards the sea—artist, Wilhelm Heine (1856)

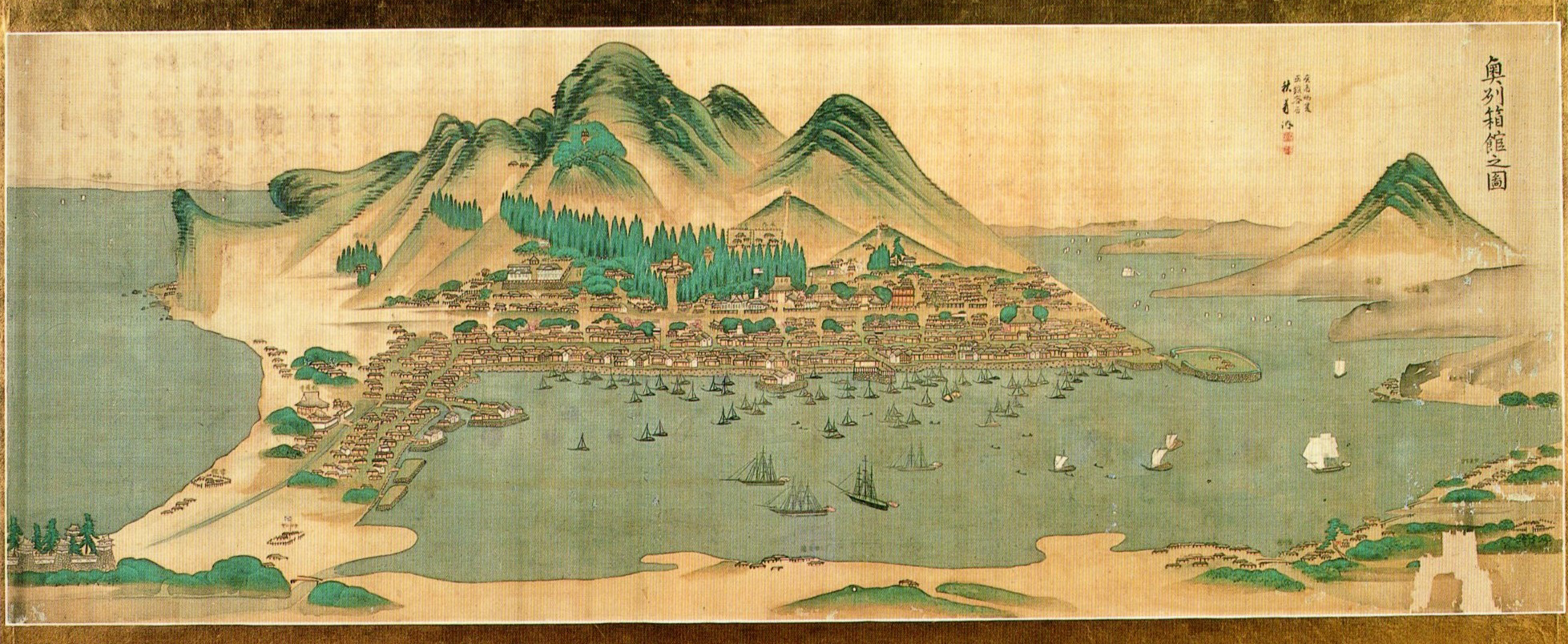
Port of Hakodate map c. 1863

=== Meiji Restoration ===
The port of Hakodate was surveyed by a fleet of five U.S. ships in 1854 under the conditions of the Convention of Kanagawa, as negotiated by Commodore Matthew C. Perry.

Hakodate port partially opened to foreign ships for provisioning in the following year and then completely to foreign trade on 2 June 1859 as one of five Japanese open ports designated in the 1858 Treaty of Amity and Commerce signed with the U.S. The Hakodate foreign settlement is one of the legacies of foreign influence in Hakodate.

A mariner in Perry's fleet died during a visit to the area and became the first U.S. citizen to be buried in Japan when he was interred in Hakodate's cemetery for foreigners.

Gallery

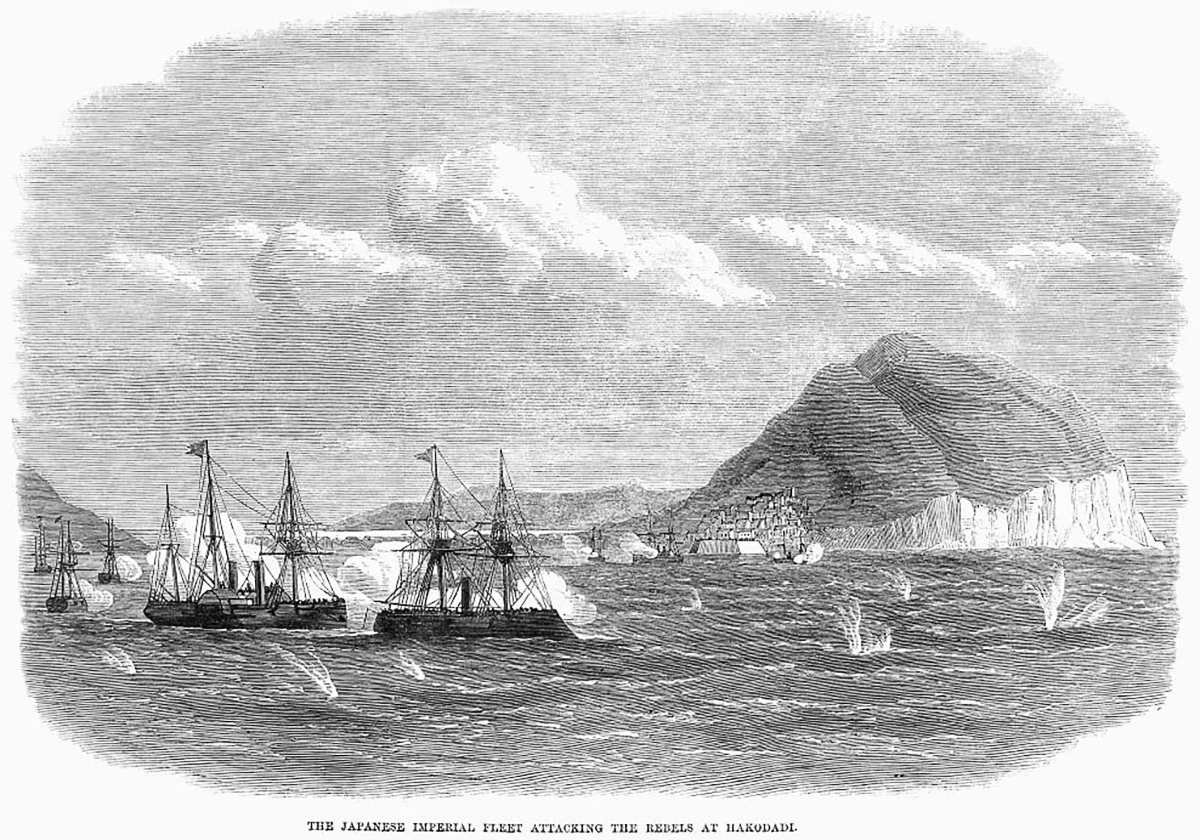
Naval Battle of Hakodate (1869)

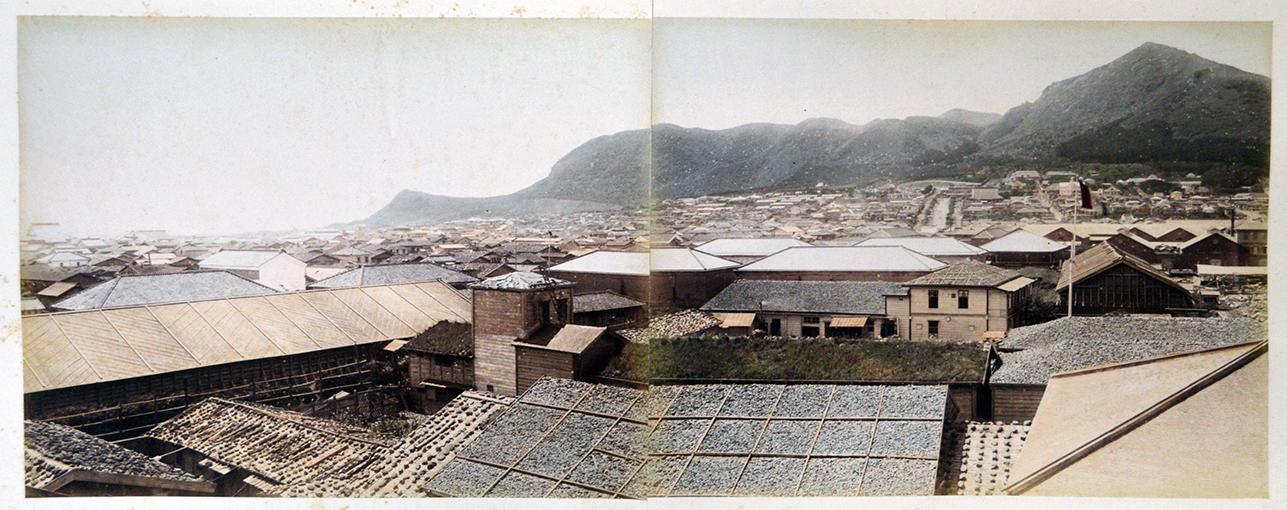
Omachi, one of the neighborhoods in the Hakodate foreign settlement (1880)

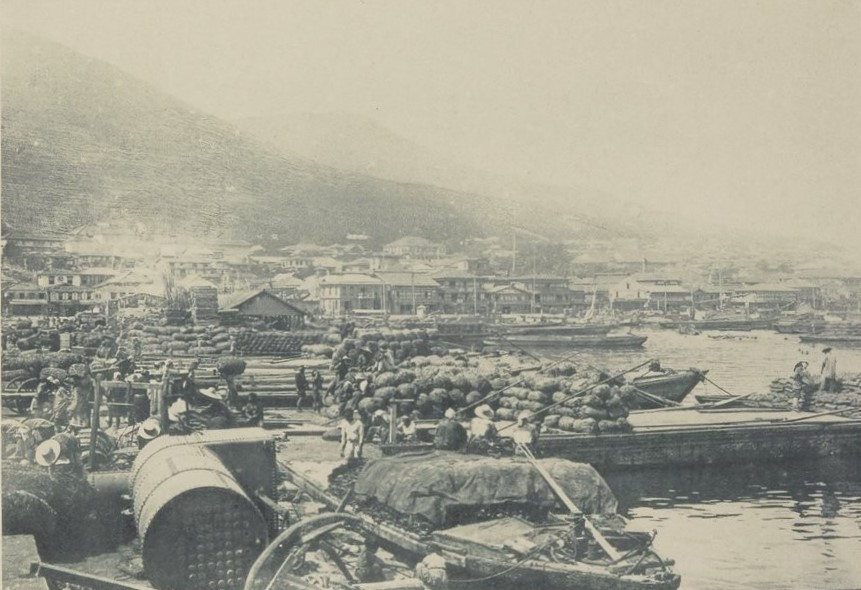
Port of Hakodate in 1897, by Ogawa Kazumasa

Goryōkaku fortress (1866)

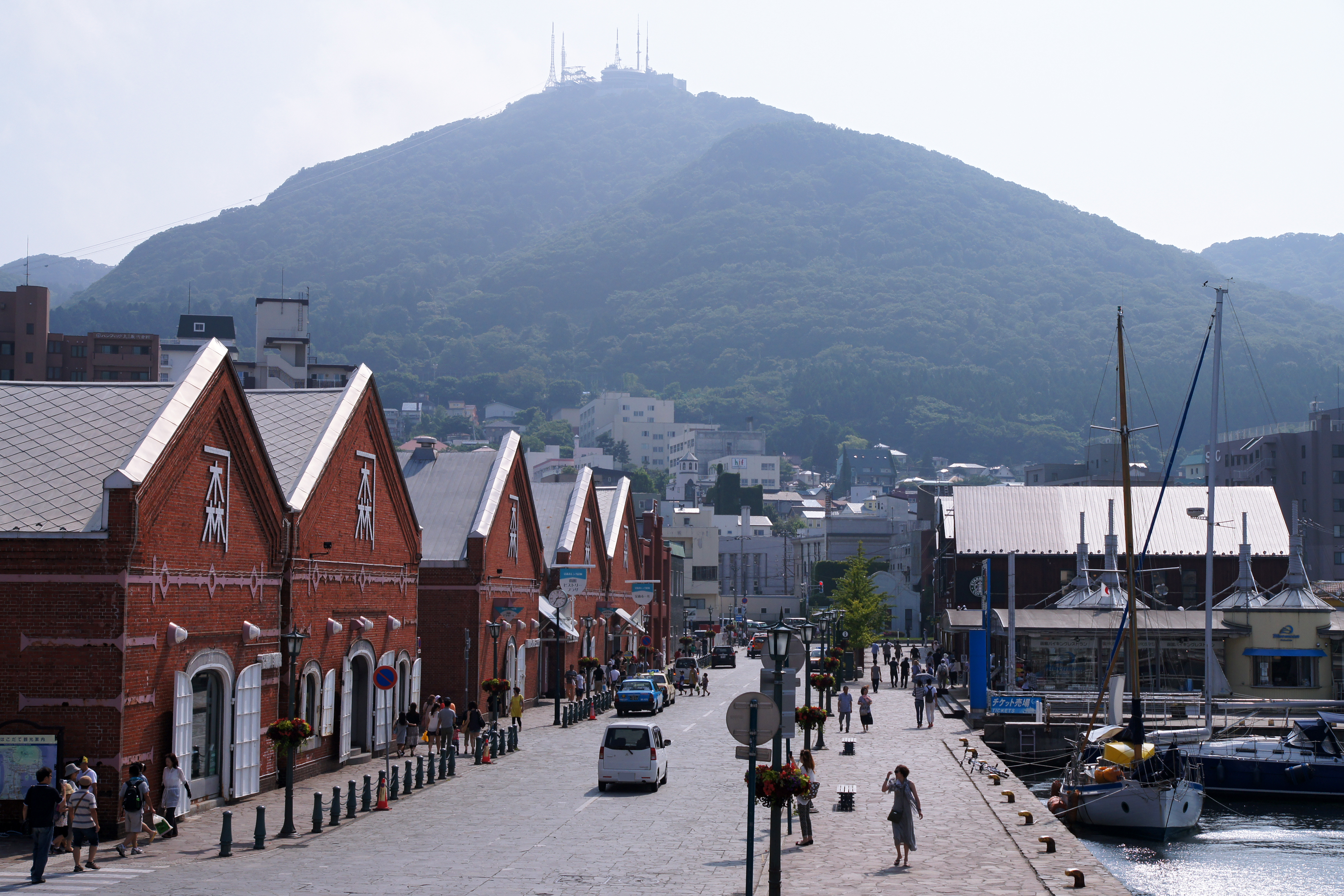
Kanemori Red Brick Warehouses (1909)

British merchant, naturalist and spy Thomas Blakiston took up residence in Hakodate in the summer of 1861 to establish a saw-milling business. He stayed in Hakodate until 1884, during which time he documented the local natural environment, equipped the local meteorological station and ran guns to the Boshin War rebels.

As one of few points of Japanese contact with the outside world, Hakodate was soon host to several overseas consulates. The Russian consulate included a chapel from where Nicholas of Japan is credited with introducing Eastern Orthodox Christianity to Japan in 1861 (now the Japanese Orthodox Church). The Orthodox church is neighbored by several other historical missionary churches, including Anglican and Catholic.

Hakodate also played a central role in the Boshin War between the Tokugawa shogunate and the Meiji Emperor which followed Perry's opening of Japan. Shogunate rebel Enomoto Takeaki fled to Hakodate with the remnants of his navy and his handful of French advisers in winter 1868, including Jules Brunet. They formally established the Republic of Ezo on December 25. The republic tried unsuccessfully to gather international recognition to foreign legations in Hakodate, including the Americans, French, and Russians. The Naval Battle of Hakodate was fought from 4 to 10 May 1869, between the remnants of the Tokugawa shogunate navy and the newly formed Imperial Japanese Navy. It was a decisive victory for the Imperial Japanese Navy.

On 14 June 1868, Hakodate was designated as an urban prefecture (府 fu), one of the first two, the other being Kyoto. On February 8, 1882, it was enlarged into Hakodate-ken, and then became part of Hokkaido on January 26, 1886.

The rebels occupied Hakodate's famous European-style Goryōkaku fort and used it as the centre of their defences in southern Hokkaido. Government forces defeated the secessionists in the Battle of Hakodate in 1869 and the city and fort were surrendered to emperor. Military leader, Hijikata Toshizō, was one of those slain in the fighting.

In 1878, Isabella Bird reported of the city in her travelogue:

The streets are very wide and clean, but the houses are mean and low. The city looks as if it had just recovered from a conflagration. The houses are nothing but tinder… Stones, however, are its prominent feature. Looking down upon it from above you see miles of grey boulders, and realise that every roof in the windy capital is "hodden doun" by a weight of paving stones.

=== 20th century to present day ===
Hakodate was awarded city status on August 1, 1922. On March 21, 1934, a serious fire had destroyed around two-thirds of all the buildings in Hakodate. This event also led to many residents leaving and subsequently depopulating the city. The city escaped most of the ravages of World War II. Areas around Hakodate-yama were fortified and access restricted to the public. Many prisoners of war were interned in Hakodate and historians record a total of 10 camps. The city was subjected to two Allied bombing raids on 14 and 15 July 1945. Around 400 homes were destroyed on the western side of Hakodate-yama and an Aomori-Hakodate ferry was attacked with 400 passengers killed.

Hakodate annexed the village of Senkamesawa in December 1966. Hakodate merged with the neighboring city of Kameda on December 1, 1973. Kameda had a population of 66,552 at the time of the merger, and Hakodate's population jumped to 300,490 as a result.

In 1976, a defecting Soviet pilot named Viktor Belenko flew his plane into the civilian airport in Hakodate.

Hakodate's municipal area nearly doubled on December 1, 2004, when the town of Minamikayabe (from Kayabe District), and the towns of Esan and Toi, and the village of Todohokke (all from Kameda District), were merged into it.

The Hokkaido Shinkansen line opened on March 26, 2016. The undersea Seikan Tunnel with the Hayabusa Shinkansen rail line greatly reduced the travel time from Honshu to Hakodate. The Hayabusa Shinkansen line currently terminates at Shin-Hakodate Hokuto, about 20 miles from Hakodate city center. Local rail connections are available from there.

In April 2023, Jun Ōizumi became the mayor of Hakodate. Ōizumi, the older brother of actor Yo Oizumi, defeated 3-term incumbent Toshiki Kudō, receiving more than 80% of the vote.

Gallery

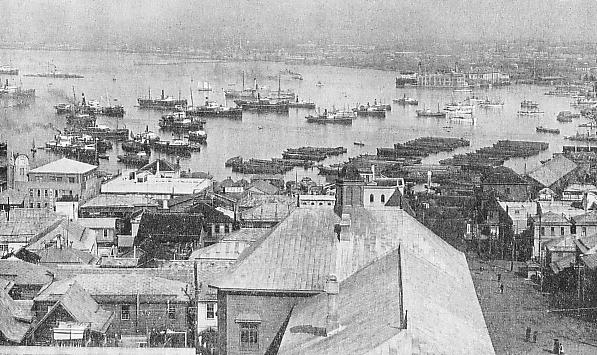
Hakodate Port circa 1930

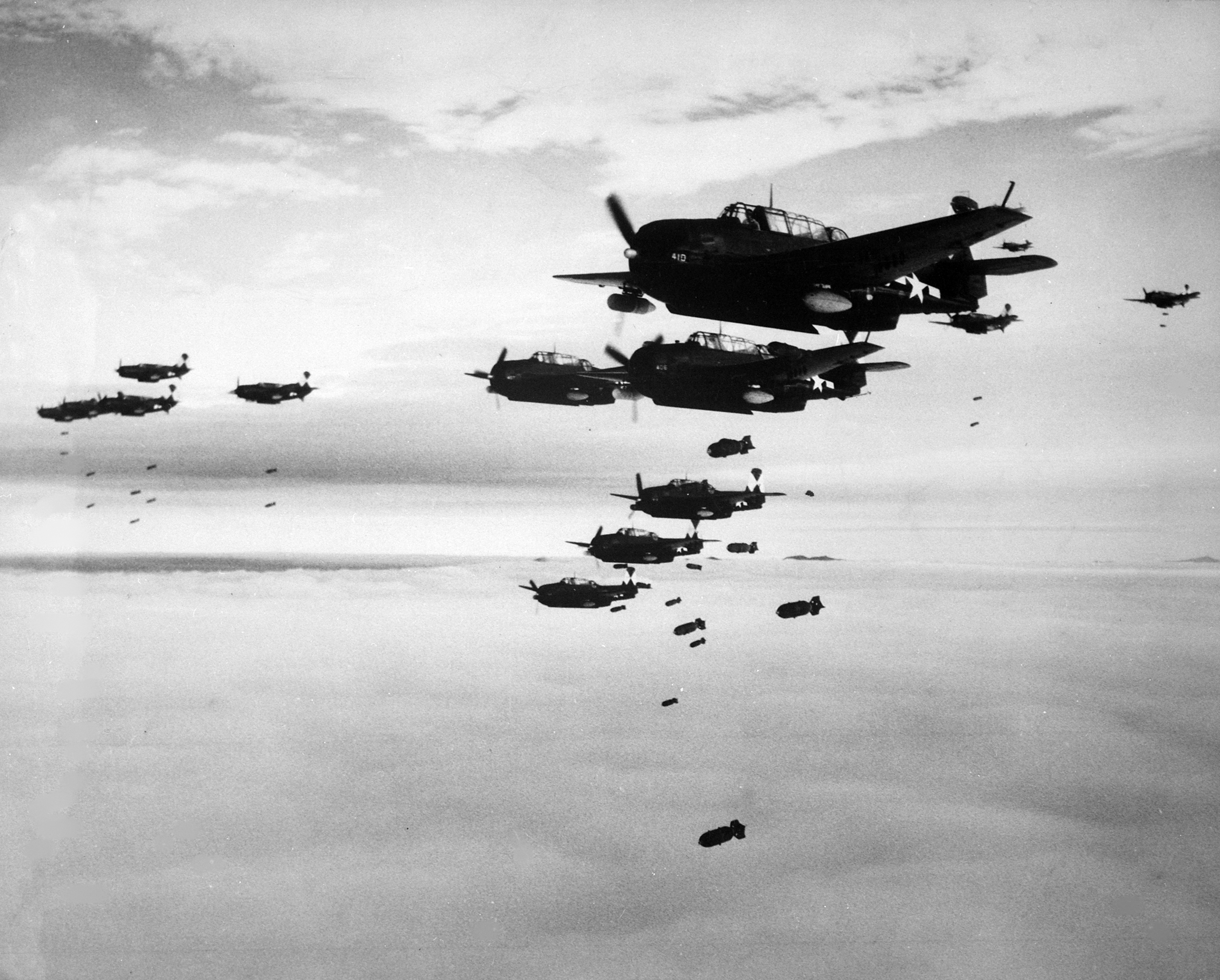
US Navy Grumman TBF Avenger aircraft dropping bombs on Hakodate during July 1945

== Geography ==
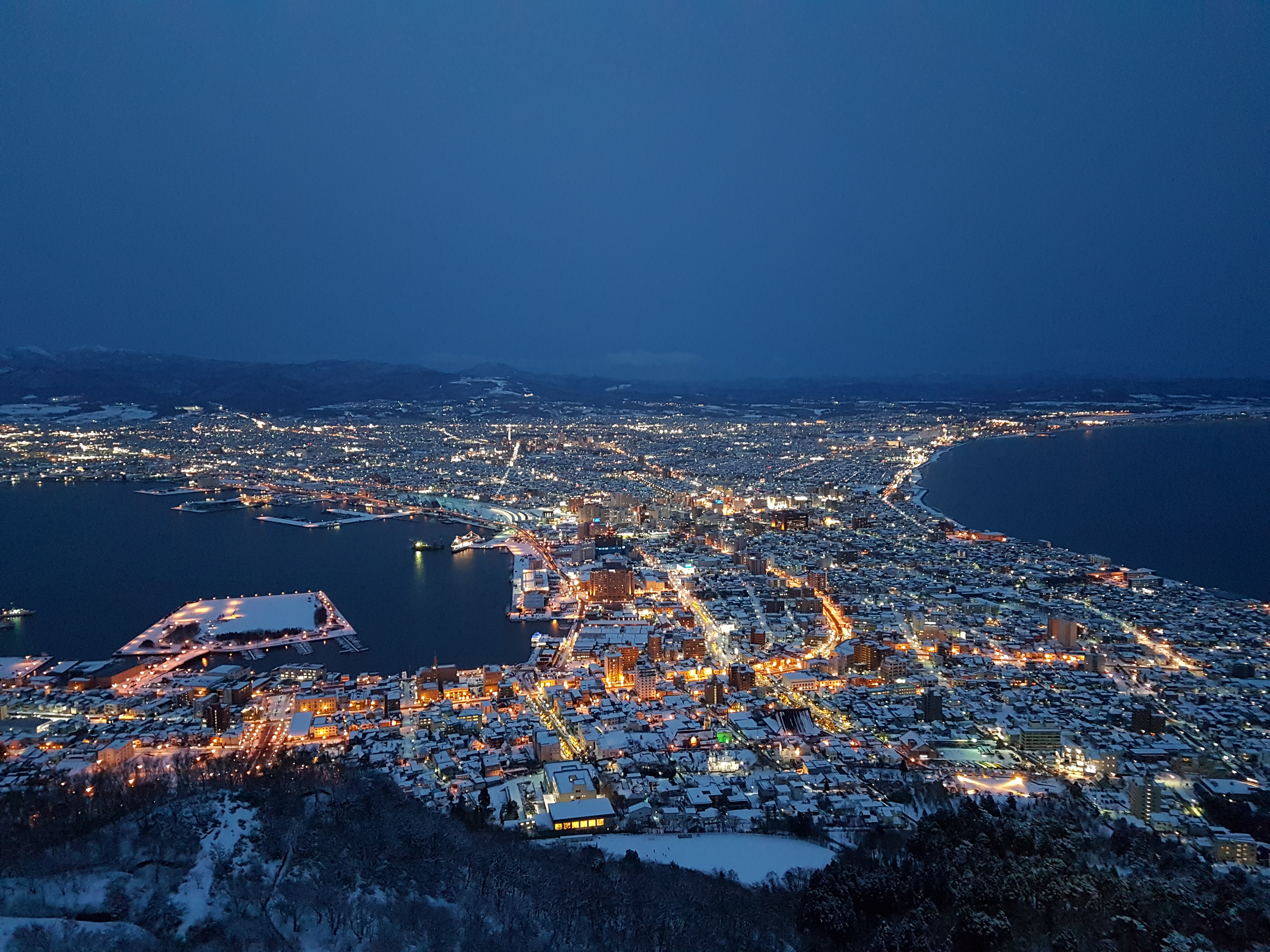
Evening view from Mount Hakodate

Mount Hakodate was originally an island that was formed by volcanic eruptions millions of years ago. During the course of history a sand bar formed between Mount Hakodate and the peninsula. This landform, which is an example of a tombolo, finished forming circa 1000 BCE. The tombolo connects the former Hakodate island with the main island Hokkaido to the north. The main central area of Hakodate city is located on the sandbar.

Hakodate is located at the center of Kameda Peninsula. The city is overlooked by Mount Hakodate. The summit can be reached by hiking trail, cable car, or by car. Visitors can also reach the peak of Mount Hakodate by taking tour bus and/or direct bus. that departs from JR Hakodate Station. An obscure local nickname of the bumpy mountain is Gagyūzan (Mount Cow's Back), alluding to the way the mountain resembles a resting cow.

The former Goryōkaku fort is now used in as a public park and is popular in Hokkaido for hanami (cherry blossom viewing). Since April 2006, the park has also featured the tall, white Goryōkaku Tower. Resembling an air traffic control tower, the structure offers a panoramic view of the park, including mainland Japan across the Tsugaru Strait on clear days.

=== Nearby cities and towns ===
- Hokuto to the west
- Nanae to the north
- Shikabe to the north east

=== Mountains ===
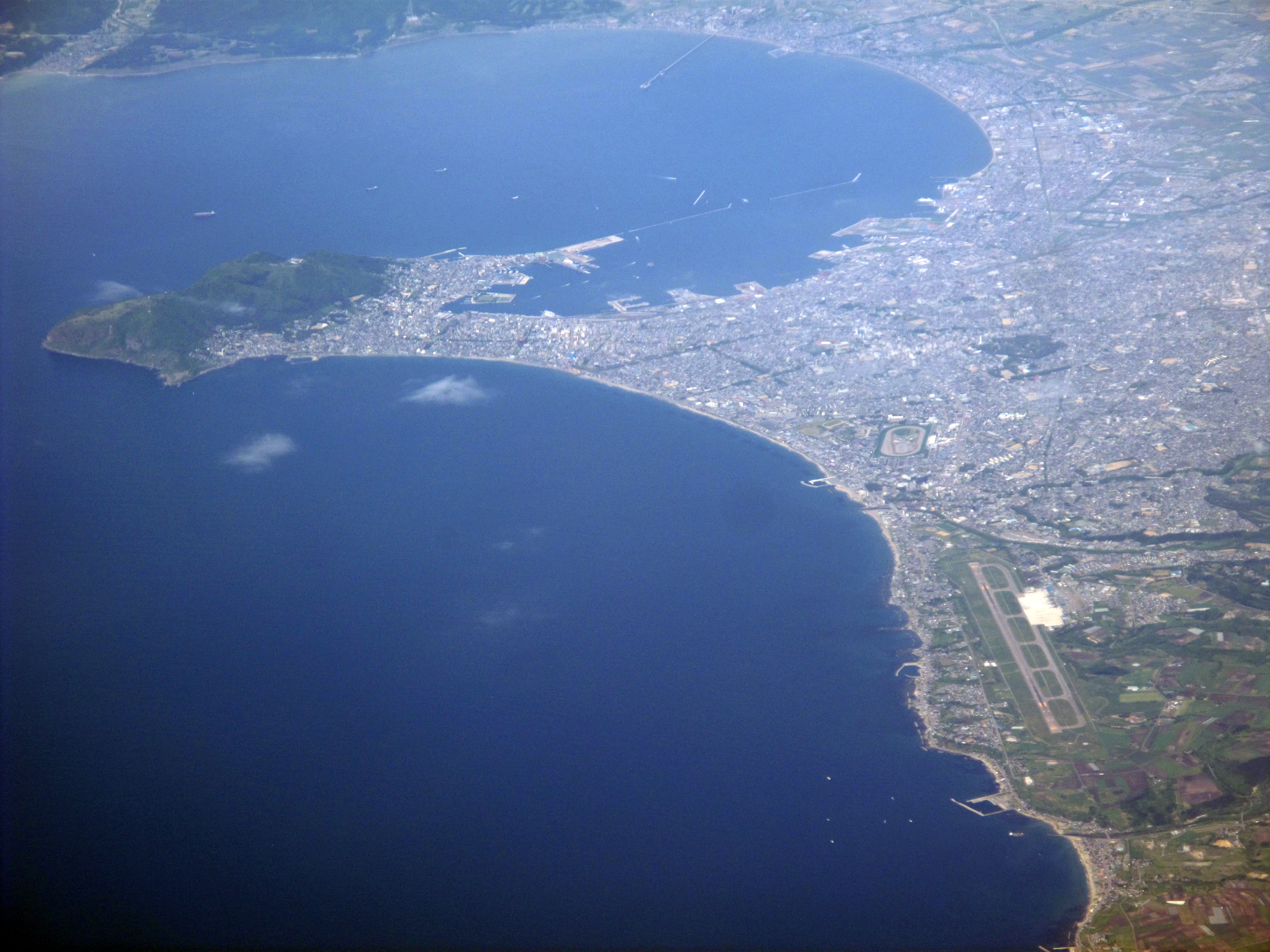
Aerial view of Hakodate with Mount Hakodate on the left side (2012)

- Mount E (618 m (2,028 ft)): Hokkaido's southernmost volcano
- Mount Hakodate (334 m (1,096 ft))

=== Rivers ===
- Kameda River (亀田川, Kameda-gawa)
- Matsukura River (松倉川, Matsukura-gawa)
- Shiodomari River (汐泊川, Shiodomari-gawa)

=== Cityscape ===
Hakodate has a cityscape that covers the center of the Kameda peninsula. A narrow land area separates Hakodate Bay to the west from Tsugaru Strait in the south-east side. It is best viewed from the top of Mount Hakodate.

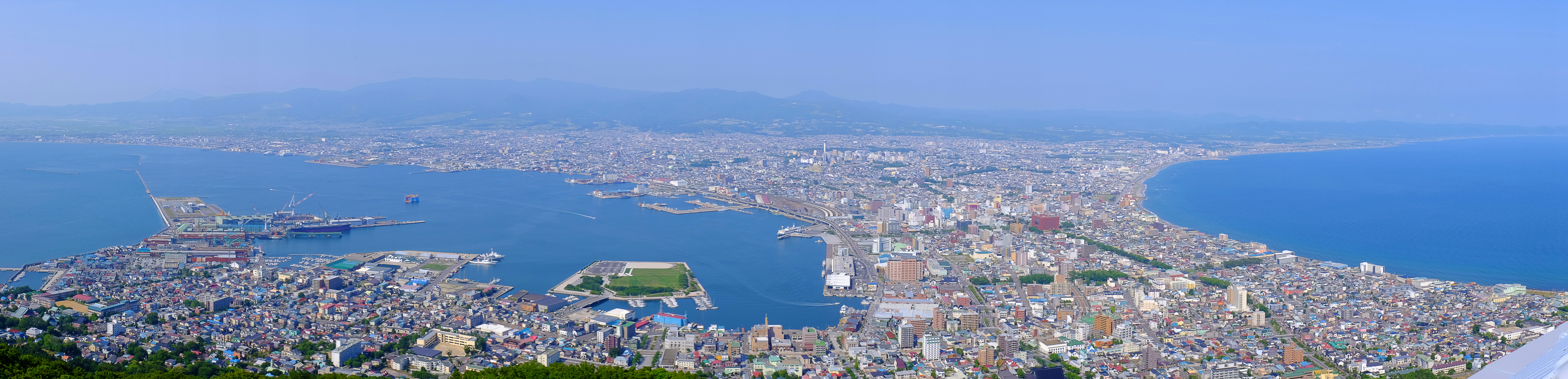
Panoramic view of Hakodate (10 July 2015)

=== Demographics ===
The population of Hakodate increased by 402% from 28,825 to 144,749 between 1873 till 1920. Hakodate's population peaked in 1980 at 320,154, but has been gradually in decline due to aging since then.

Census data

Year	Pop.	±%
1873	28,825	—
1920	144,749	+402.2%
1925	163,972	+13.3%
1930	197,252	+20.3%
1935	207,480	+5.2%
1940	203,862	−1.7%
1950	228,994	+12.3%
1955	242,582	+5.9%
1960	243,012	+0.2%
1965	243,418	+0.2%

Year	Pop.	±%
1970	241,663	−0.7%
1975	307,453	+27.2%
1980	320,154	+4.1%
1985	319,194	−0.3%
1990	307,249	−3.7%
1995	298,881	−2.7%
2000	287,637	−3.8%
2005	294,264	+2.3%
2010	279,127	−5.1%
2015	265,979	−4.7%

Source: Statistics Bureau , Japanese Imperial Commission (1873)

== Climate ==
According to the Köppen climate classification, Hakodate's climate is Hot Summer humid continental (Dfa) of hot summers and winters with regular intense blizzards. With an alternate definition, using the −3 °C (27 °F) isotherm, Hakodate falls in the Humid Subtropical Climate (Cfa) commonly found on the east coast of the continents. The warmest month has an average temperature of 22.1 °C (71.8 °F). And so the city is the limit of hot summer climates for a city on the immediate coast in Japan (Cfa/Dfa), although appearing in other interior regions of the province. Hakodate has snowy winters and warm, humid summers. Winters are cold for the latitude (the same as Northern California) but milder than much of Hokkaido.

Hakodate features four distinct seasons. The city sees a substantial amount of snowfall during the course of the year, averaging roughly 380 cm (150 in) of snow annually. Spring typically begins with some snowfall, but sees a gradual warming trend as the season progress. Summers are generally warm but not hot, with average high temperatures in the warmest month (August) hovering around 26 °C (79 °F). Fall initially is warm but becomes increasingly colder as the season progress. It is not uncommon to see snowfall in the latter parts of the fall season.

Climate data for Hakodate (elevation 35 m, 1991–2020 normals, extremes 1872–present)
Month	Jan	Feb	Mar	Apr	May	Jun	Jul	Aug	Sep	Oct	Nov	Dec	Year
Record high °C (°F)	12.5 (54.5)	16.0 (60.8)	16.9 (62.4)	23.6 (74.5)	28.0 (82.4)	29.1 (84.4)	33.7 (92.7)	35.4 (95.7)	32.6 (90.7)	27.8 (82.0)	22.7 (72.9)	16.3 (61.3)	35.4 (95.7)
Mean maximum °C (°F)	6.7 (44.1)	8.3 (46.9)	12.9 (55.2)	19.1 (66.4)	23.8 (74.8)	26.2 (79.2)	29.2 (84.6)	30.5 (86.9)	28.4 (83.1)	22.5 (72.5)	17.0 (62.6)	10.9 (51.6)	30.9 (87.6)
Mean daily maximum °C (°F)	0.9 (33.6)	1.8 (35.2)	5.8 (42.4)	12.0 (53.6)	17.0 (62.6)	20.4 (68.7)	24.1 (75.4)	25.9 (78.6)	23.2 (73.8)	17.1 (62.8)	10.0 (50.0)	3.2 (37.8)	13.5 (56.3)
Daily mean °C (°F)	−2.4 (27.7)	−1.8 (28.8)	1.9 (35.4)	7.3 (45.1)	12.3 (54.1)	16.2 (61.2)	20.3 (68.5)	22.1 (71.8)	18.8 (65.8)	12.5 (54.5)	6.0 (42.8)	−0.1 (31.8)	9.4 (48.9)
Mean daily minimum °C (°F)	−6.0 (21.2)	−5.7 (21.7)	−2.2 (28.0)	2.8 (37.0)	8.0 (46.4)	12.6 (54.7)	17.3 (63.1)	18.9 (66.0)	14.6 (58.3)	7.8 (46.0)	1.8 (35.2)	−3.6 (25.5)	5.5 (41.9)
Mean minimum °C (°F)	−11.3 (11.7)	−11.4 (11.5)	−7.7 (18.1)	−2.2 (28.0)	2.9 (37.2)	7.7 (45.9)	12.9 (55.2)	14.0 (57.2)	8.5 (47.3)	1.8 (35.2)	−4.2 (24.4)	−9.3 (15.3)	−12.4 (9.7)
Record low °C (°F)	−21.7 (−7.1)	−20.4 (−4.7)	−18.9 (−2.0)	−8.6 (16.5)	−5.0 (23.0)	2.0 (35.6)	6.3 (43.3)	9.0 (48.2)	1.7 (35.1)	−4.0 (24.8)	−12.1 (10.2)	−19.4 (−2.9)	−21.7 (−7.1)
Average precipitation mm (inches)	77.4 (3.05)	64.5 (2.54)	64.1 (2.52)	71.9 (2.83)	88.9 (3.50)	79.8 (3.14)	123.6 (4.87)	156.5 (6.16)	150.5 (5.93)	105.6 (4.16)	110.8 (4.36)	94.6 (3.72)	1,188 (46.77)
Average snowfall cm (inches)	91 (36)	74 (29)	41 (16)	2 (0.8)	0 (0)	0 (0)	0 (0)	0 (0)	0 (0)	0 (0)	18 (7.1)	79 (31)	306 (120)
Average precipitation days (≥ 0.5 mm)	19.9	17.5	16.8	12.2	11.1	8.9	10.2	10.4	11.9	12.9	16.7	19.2	167.7
Average snowy days	27.9	24.6	21.3	6.4	0.0	0.0	0.0	0.0	0.0	1.2	11.8	25.8	118.7
Average relative humidity (%)	73	71	68	67	73	79	82	81	76	73	71	74	74
Mean monthly sunshine hours	103.1	117.9	158.7	186.1	198.5	172.6	134.4	148.0	160.8	163.9	109.4	91.5	1,744.9
Source: Japan Meteorological Agency (1991–2020 normals, 1872–present extremes)

Climate data for Takamatsu, Hakodate (elevation 34 m, 2003–2020 normals, extremes 2003–present)
Month	Jan	Feb	Mar	Apr	May	Jun	Jul	Aug	Sep	Oct	Nov	Dec	Year
Record high °C (°F)	11.0 (51.8)	14.9 (58.8)	15.4 (59.7)	20.9 (69.6)	24.5 (76.1)	29.3 (84.7)	31.0 (87.8)	33.1 (91.6)	31.2 (88.2)	25.9 (78.6)	20.6 (69.1)	15.6 (60.1)	33.1 (91.6)
Mean daily maximum °C (°F)	1.0 (33.8)	1.8 (35.2)	6.0 (42.8)	11.1 (52.0)	15.6 (60.1)	19.0 (66.2)	22.5 (72.5)	25.1 (77.2)	22.9 (73.2)	17.2 (63.0)	10.4 (50.7)	3.5 (38.3)	13.0 (55.4)
Daily mean °C (°F)	−2.6 (27.3)	−2.0 (28.4)	1.8 (35.2)	6.6 (43.9)	11.3 (52.3)	15.3 (59.5)	19.3 (66.7)	21.6 (70.9)	18.6 (65.5)	12.4 (54.3)	6.1 (43.0)	−0.1 (31.8)	9.0 (48.2)
Mean daily minimum °C (°F)	−7.4 (18.7)	−7.1 (19.2)	−3.1 (26.4)	1.2 (34.2)	6.6 (43.9)	11.8 (53.2)	16.6 (61.9)	18.4 (65.1)	14.3 (57.7)	7.1 (44.8)	1.2 (34.2)	−4.5 (23.9)	4.6 (40.3)
Record low °C (°F)	−18.2 (−0.8)	−17.5 (0.5)	−14.2 (6.4)	−5.9 (21.4)	−2.1 (28.2)	4.2 (39.6)	9.0 (48.2)	10.0 (50.0)	4.5 (40.1)	−2.9 (26.8)	−9.5 (14.9)	−17.6 (0.3)	−18.2 (−0.8)
Average precipitation mm (inches)	34.6 (1.36)	34.2 (1.35)	46.6 (1.83)	71.1 (2.80)	80.9 (3.19)	74.2 (2.92)	127.1 (5.00)	148.5 (5.85)	132.4 (5.21)	98.9 (3.89)	98.6 (3.88)	66.6 (2.62)	1,013.7 (39.91)
Average snowfall cm (inches)	60 (24)	55 (22)	30 (12)	1 (0.4)	0 (0)	0 (0)	0 (0)	0 (0)	0 (0)	0 (0)	13 (5.1)	57 (22)	216 (85)
Average precipitation days (≥ 1.0 mm)	6.4	6.9	8.4	9.2	9.1	7.8	9.1	9.1	10.7	10.4	11.1	10.1	108.3
Source: Japan Meteorological Agency (2003–2020 normals, 2006–2020 snowfall normals, 2003–present extremes)

Climate data for Kakkumi, Hakodate (elevation 31 m, 1991–2020 normals, extremes 1977–present)
Month	Jan	Feb	Mar	Apr	May	Jun	Jul	Aug	Sep	Oct	Nov	Dec	Year
Record high °C (°F)	11.7 (53.1)	15.8 (60.4)	16.9 (62.4)	22.2 (72.0)	28.4 (83.1)	27.8 (82.0)	32.7 (90.9)	33.4 (92.1)	31.6 (88.9)	27.3 (81.1)	21.6 (70.9)	15.8 (60.4)	33.4 (92.1)
Mean daily maximum °C (°F)	0.8 (33.4)	1.3 (34.3)	4.8 (40.6)	10.2 (50.4)	15.1 (59.2)	18.0 (64.4)	21.9 (71.4)	24.0 (75.2)	21.8 (71.2)	16.3 (61.3)	9.6 (49.3)	3.2 (37.8)	12.2 (54.0)
Daily mean °C (°F)	−2.1 (28.2)	−1.8 (28.8)	1.4 (34.5)	6.2 (43.2)	10.8 (51.4)	14.4 (57.9)	18.7 (65.7)	20.7 (69.3)	18.0 (64.4)	12.2 (54.0)	5.9 (42.6)	0.0 (32.0)	8.7 (47.7)
Mean daily minimum °C (°F)	−5.3 (22.5)	−5.3 (22.5)	−2.0 (28.4)	2.5 (36.5)	7.3 (45.1)	11.5 (52.7)	16.2 (61.2)	18.0 (64.4)	14.6 (58.3)	8.3 (46.9)	2.2 (36.0)	−3.2 (26.2)	5.4 (41.7)
Record low °C (°F)	−14.4 (6.1)	−14.6 (5.7)	−10.6 (12.9)	−4.5 (23.9)	0.1 (32.2)	4.1 (39.4)	8.5 (47.3)	11.6 (52.9)	5.7 (42.3)	0.3 (32.5)	−8.1 (17.4)	−13.2 (8.2)	−14.6 (5.7)
Average precipitation mm (inches)	72.9 (2.87)	64.0 (2.52)	77.3 (3.04)	98.4 (3.87)	111.8 (4.40)	95.1 (3.74)	130.8 (5.15)	204.9 (8.07)	210.9 (8.30)	141.4 (5.57)	134.2 (5.28)	99.0 (3.90)	1,441.3 (56.74)
Average precipitation days (≥ 1.0 mm)	9.8	9.1	11.1	10.3	10.7	9.2	10.7	11.2	11.9	11.8	11.5	10.8	128.1
Mean monthly sunshine hours	113.0	124.0	166.5	184.7	190.6	144.5	129.7	135.5	153.3	158.3	118.5	99.0	1,717.7
Source: Japan Meteorological Agency (1991–2020 normals, 1977–present extremes)

== Economy ==
Prior to its dissolution, Air Hokkaido was headquartered in Hakodate. In January 2006, the regional airline Airtransse was headquartered in Hakodate.

== Culture and landmarks ==
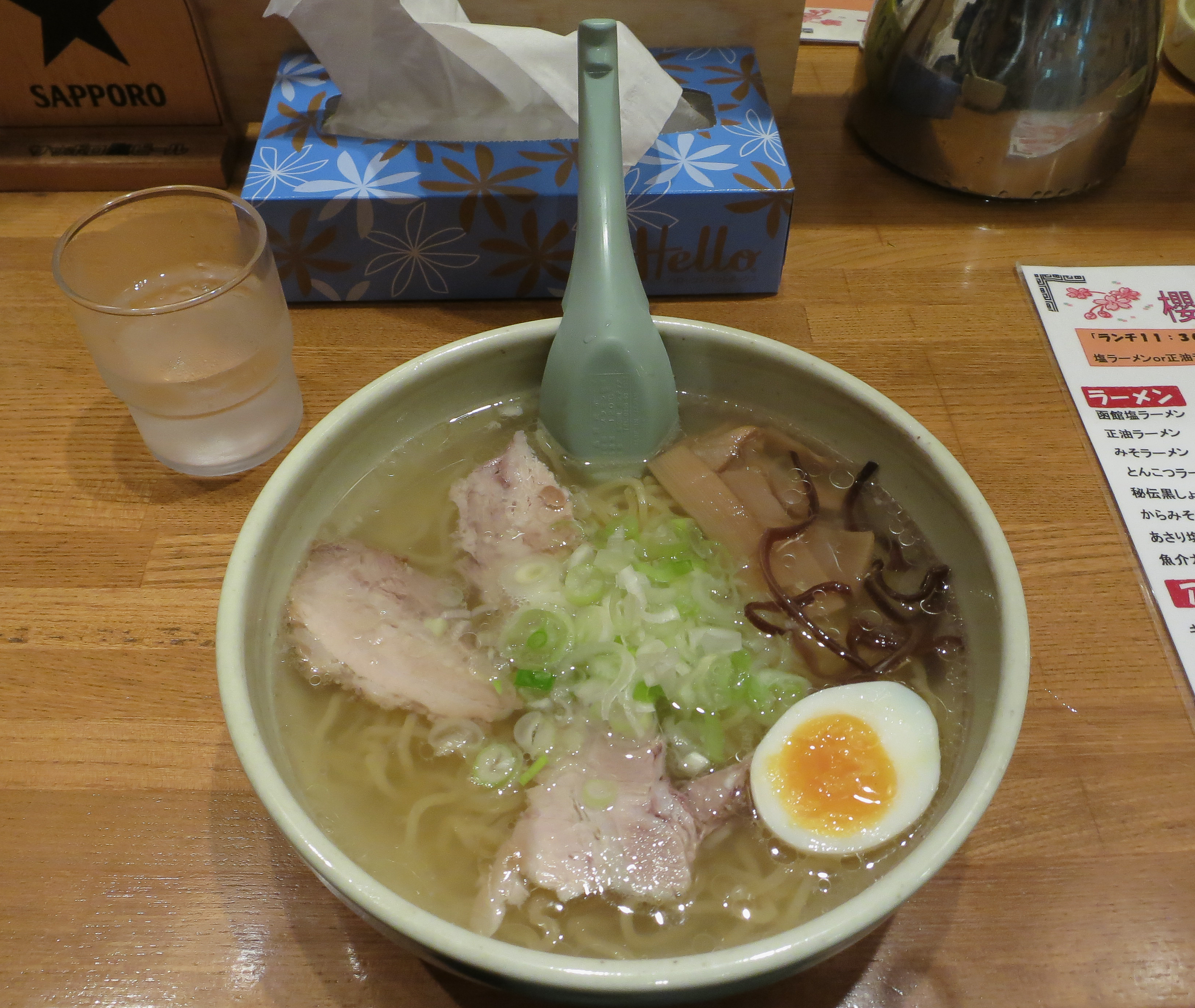
Hakodate shio (salt) ramen

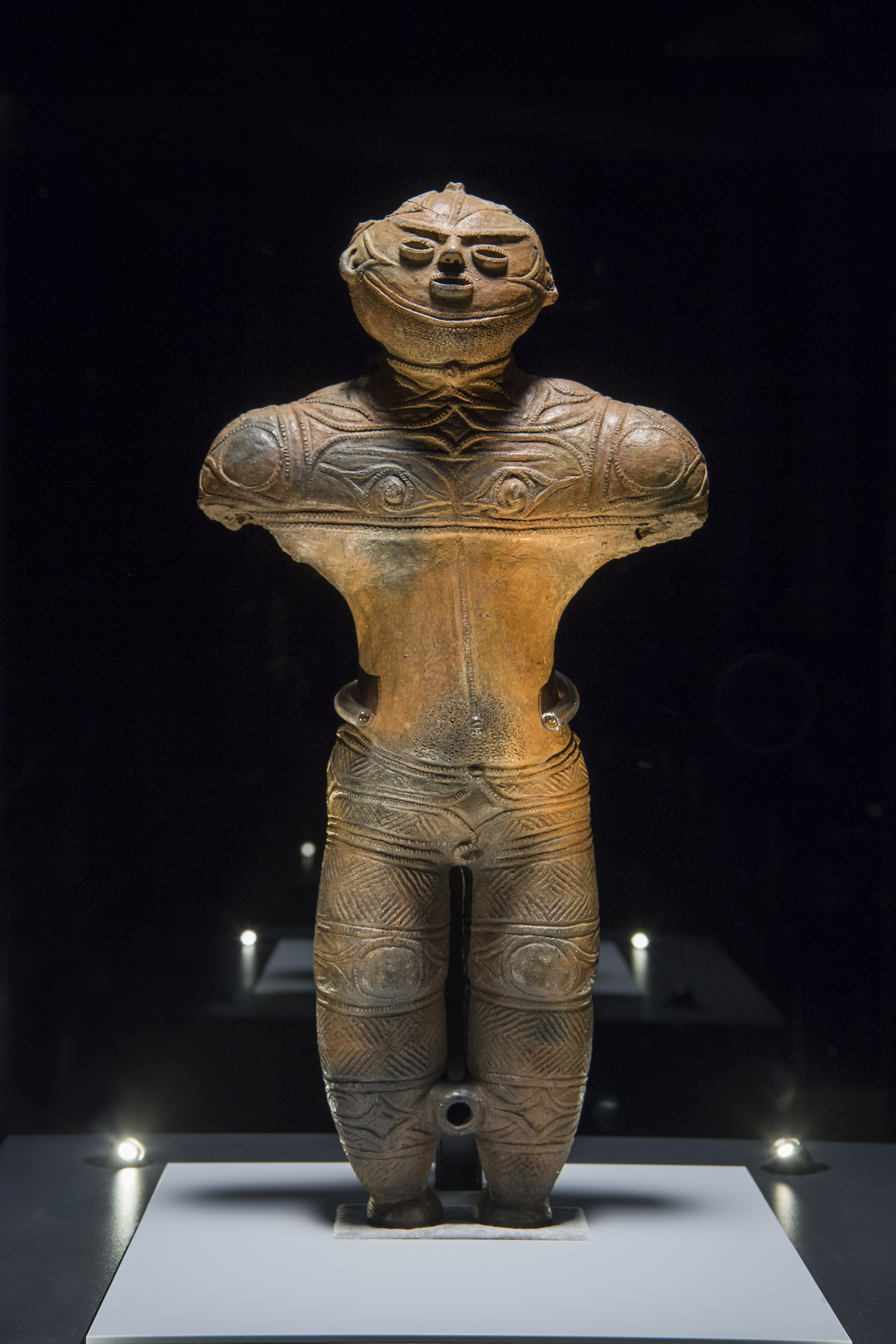
Hollow Dogū, the only National Treasure in Hokkaidō, is exhibited at the Hakodate Jōmon Culture Center

In Funami-cho there is the Koryu-ji temple. It's the oldest Buddhist temple (affiliated with the Soto school) in the region which was built in 1633. It was badly damaged during the Boshin War and moved to its current location in 1879. The existing main building was built in 1900.

The city is well known for seafood and sushi. Hakodate shio (salt) ramen is also a famous specialty of the city. Shio ramen has a pale, clear, broth made with plenty of salt and any combination of chicken, pork bone, vegetables, fish, and seaweed. On a similar note, Hakodate's city fish is the squid. Hakodate is famous for the restaurant Ikkatei Tabiji, which serves a dish called "dancing squid": – a recently deceased squid is served with soy sauce, the sodium of the soy sauce causes a cadaveric spasm when it is poured over the squid.

Every year (August) the city gets together for the Hakodate Port Festival. Many citizens gather in the streets to dance a wiggly dance known as the Ika-odori (Squid Dance), the name of which describes the dance appropriately. The glowing lights of squid-catching boats can be seen in the waters surrounding the city. The bell of Haristos Orthodox Church is one of the 100 Soundscapes of Japan.

The Hakodate Fish Market (otherwise known as the Asaichi or the Morning Market) is approximately 10-minute walk from the JR Hakodate Station. It is open daily and boasts hundreds of fish and sea food stands in addition to restaurants. Popular fares include sea urchin and calamari, the famous Japanese snow crab from the famous Hokkaido waters.

- Hakodate City Museum
- Hakodate City Museum of Literature
- Hakodate City Museum of Northern Peoples
- Hakodate Dock Red Brick Warehouses
- Hakodate Hachiman Shrine
- Hakodate Museum of Art, Hokkaido
- Hakodate Jōmon Culture Center
- Hakodate Park
- Kanemori Red Brick Warehouses
- Mount Hakodate Ropeway
- Our Lady of the Angels Trappistine Abbey
- Holy Resurrection Orthodox Church
- Shinori-date
- Shiryōkaku

== Transportation ==
A map of Hakodate tram: red and blue represent trams, grey represents rail, dashed purple represents Mt. Hakodate ropeway, while dashed blue represents ferries

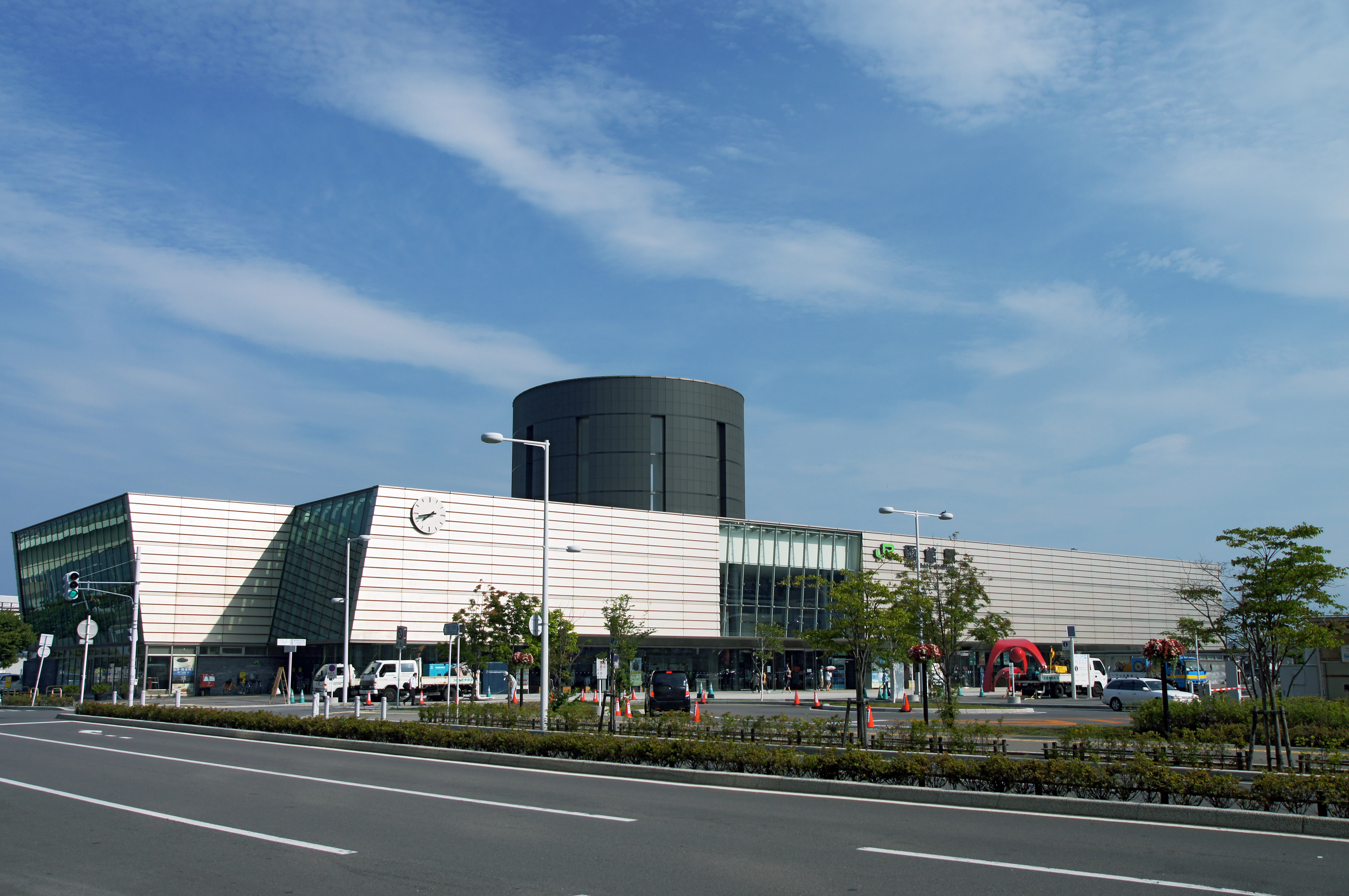
Hakodate railway Station

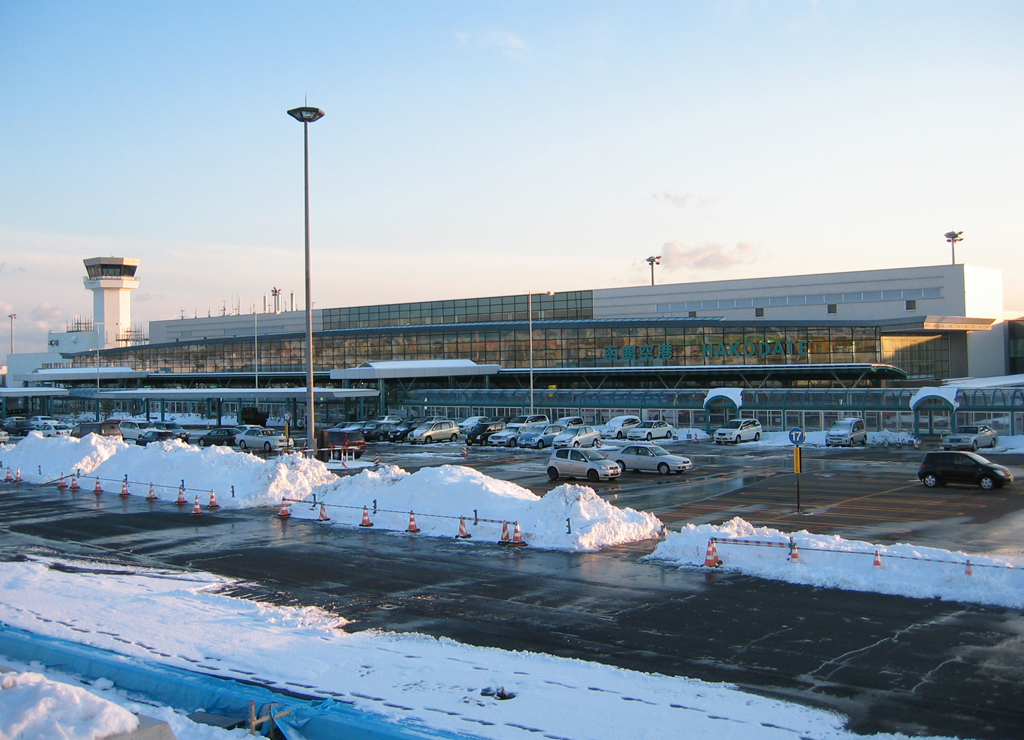
Hakodate Airport

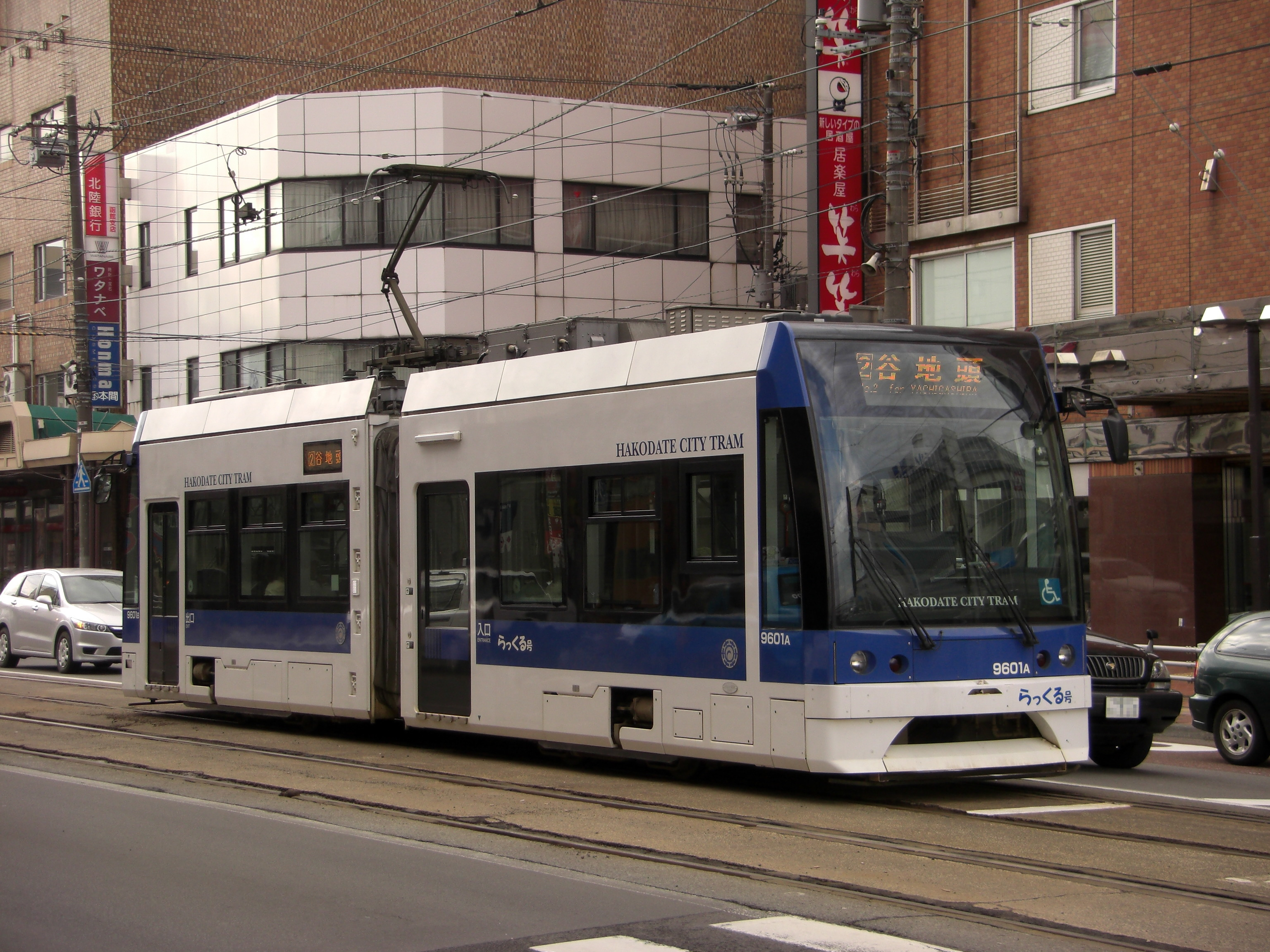
Hakodate tram

Hakodate Transportation Bureau operates tram lines.

The Hokkaido Shinkansen opened in March 2016. It currently runs to Shin-Hakodate-Hokuto Station through the Seikan Tunnel from Shin-Aomori Station. The new terminal is 17 km (11 mi) away from Hakodate Station. There are plans to extend the Hokkaido Shinkansen north to Sapporo Station by 2038.

- JR Hokkaido station
  - Hakodate Main Line: Hakodate Station – Goryōkaku Station – Kikyō Station
  - South Hokkaido Railway Company: Goryōkaku Station
- Hakodate Airport
- Port of Hakodate
- Hokkaido Expressway

== Media ==
In Hakodate, there are mass media and information and telecommunications providers such as newspaper companies, TV broadcasters, community broadcasters, and cable TV operators.

=== Newspapers ===
- Hakodate Newspaper

=== Television ===
- HBC Hakodate Broadcasting Station
- NHK Hakodate Broadcasting Station
- STV Hakodate Broadcasting Station

=== Radio ===
- FM Iruka

=== Cable TV ===
- NCV Hakodate Center

== Education ==
=== Universities ===
National

- Hokkaido University, Hakodate Campus
- Hokkaido University of Education, Hakodate Campus

Public

- Future University Hakodate

Private

- Hakodate Junior College
- Hakodate Otani College
- Hakodate University
- Russia Kyokutou University Hakodate school

=== Colleges ===
National

- National Institute of Technology, Hakodate College

=== High schools ===
==== Public ====
- Hakodate City High School
- Hokkaido Hakodate Chubu High School
- Hokkaido Hakodate Commercial High School
- Hokkaido Hakodate Nishi High School
- Hokkaido Hakodate Ryohoku High School
- Hokkaido Hakodate Technical High School
- Hokkaido Minamikayabe High School
- Hokkaido Toi High School

==== Private ====
- Hakodate La Salle Junior High School & Senior High School
- Hakodate Shirayuri Gakuen Junior High School & Senior High School
- Hakodate Otani High School
- Hakuryo High School affiliated with Hakodate University
- Iai Joshi Women's Academy
- Otsuma High School
- Seisho Gakuin High School
- Yuto High School affiliated with Hakodate University

== Sister cities ==
- Halifax, Nova Scotia, Canada (since 1982)
- Vladivostok, Primorsky Krai, Russia (since 1992)
- City of Lake Macquarie, New South Wales, Australia (since 1992)
- Yuzhno-Sakhalinsk, Sakhalin Oblast, Russia (since 1997)
- Singapore (since 1992)
- Tianjin, China (since 2001)
- Goyang, Gyeonggi-do, South Korea (since 2011)

== Notable people ==
- Glay, rock/pop band
- Great Kojika, Japanese professional wrestler, founder and chairman of Big Japan Pro Wrestling (Real Name: Shinya Koshika, Nihongo: 小鹿 信也, Koshika Shinya)
- Juran Hisao, mystery writer
- Kōhan Kawauchi, screenwriter
- Saburō Kitajima, singer
- Hidemi Kon, literary critic
- Naoko Matsui, voice actress
- Gorô Naya, voice actor
- Kogo Noda, screenwriter
- Kazuo Ohno, Butoh dancer
- Menso-re Oyaji, Japanese professional wrestler (Real Name: Yohei Nakajima, Nihongo: 中島洋平, Nakajima Yōhei)
- Hideko Takamine, actress
- Yuki, musician (Real Name: Yuki Kuramochi, Nihongo: 倉持 有希, Kuramochi Yuki)
