= Hakodate University =

Private University in Hokkaido, Japan

Coordinates: 41°47′19.7″N 140°48′22.8″E

- 函館大学
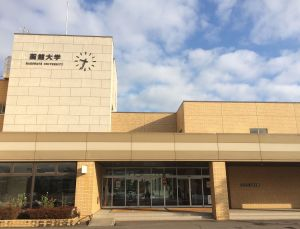
- Type: Private
- Established: 1965
- President: Junji Nomata
- Location: Hakodate, Hokkaido, Japan
- Website: Official website

Hakodate University (函館大学, Hakodate daigaku) is a private university in Hakodate, Hokkaido, Japan, established in 1965. The predecessor of the school was founded in 1938. The Faculty of Commerce is the university's only faculty, and consists of three courses: Business Management, Market Creation, and International English. The university has sister schools in Australia, the United States, England, South Korea, and China.
