= Hakodate Transportation Bureau =

Public transport authority in Hakodate, Japan

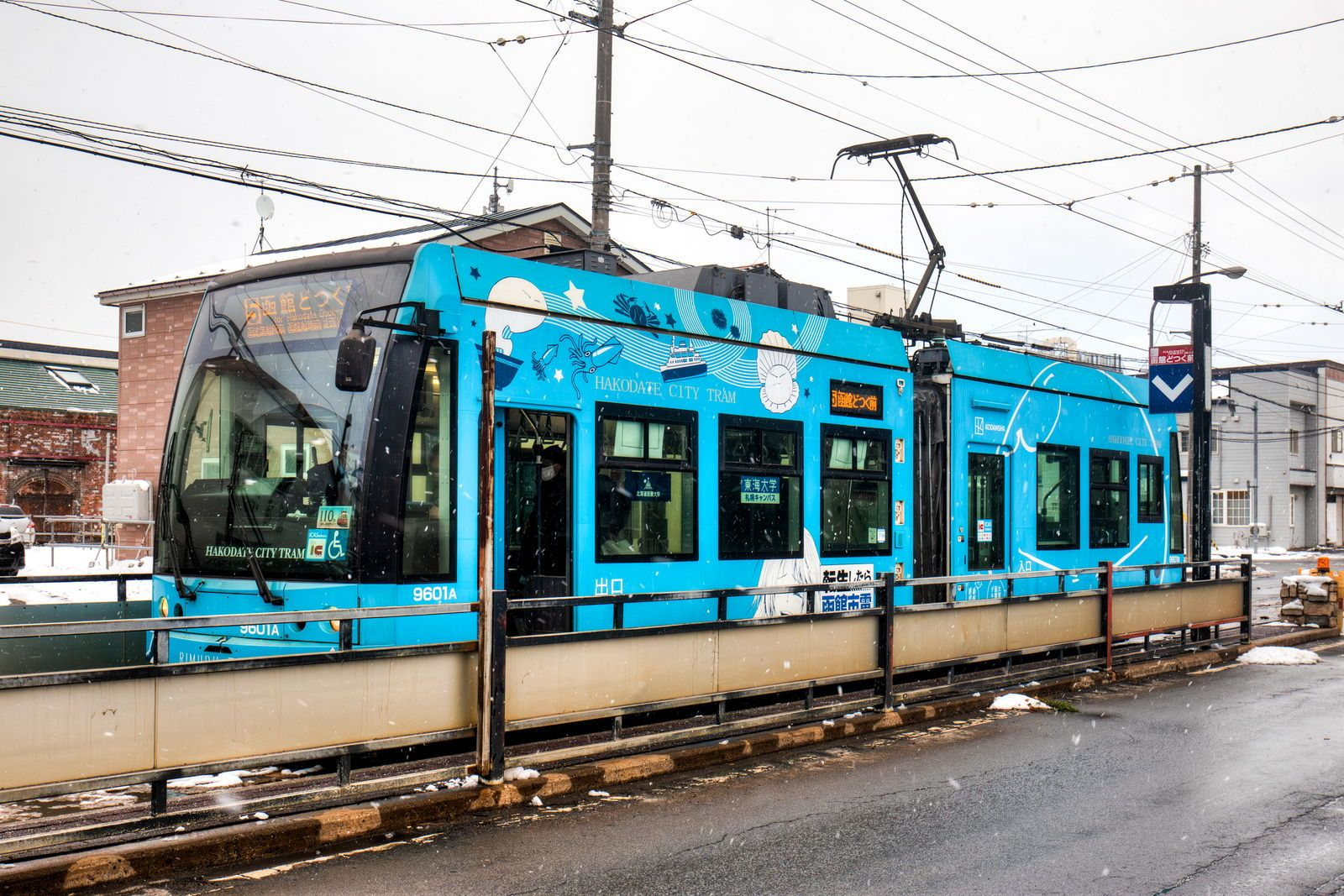
- A Hakodate City Tram type 9600 at Hakodate Dock-mae station

Overview
- Locale: Hakodate, Hokkaido, Japan
- Transit type: Tram
- Number of lines: 2 (routes), 4 (lines)
- Number of stations: 26 (20 shared)
- Annual ridership: 3,474,783 (2021)

Operation
- Began operation: 12 December 1897 (horse-drawn), 1913 (electrified)
- Rolling stock: 32 (Note: Only counting commercial vehicles)

Technical
- System length: 10.9 km (6.8 mi)
- Track gauge: 1,372 mm (4 ft 6 in)
- Electrification: 600 V DC via overhead line
System map
A transit diagram of two tram routes in Hakodate (red and blue), alongside other public transport

The Hakodate City Tram Department (函館市企業局交通部, Hakodate-shi Kigyōkyoku Kōtsūbu; lit. "Hakodate City Enterprises Bureau Transportation Division") is a public transport authority in Hakodate, Japan. The bureau currently operates only trams, although until 1 April 2003 it also ran a number of bus routes.

The Kikan Horsecar Railway (亀函馬車鉄道, Kikan Basha Tetsudō), a private horsecar operating company, opened Hakodate's first tram line in 1897. It was the first tram in Japan to be located north of Tokyo. The network was electrified in 1913. Following several changes of ownership, the Hakodate City Government finally took over control of the lines in 1943.

== Hakodate City Tram ==
There were once twelve routes operating on six lines with a total length of 17.9 km. However, declining ridership led to closure of parts of the network in 1978, 1992, and 1993. The current network consists of two routes operating on four lines with a total length of 10.9 km.

- Lines: Officially, there are four lines:
  - Main Line (本線): Hakodate Dock-mae — Jujigai — Hakodate-eki-mae
  - Yunokawa Line (湯の川線): Matsukaze-cho — Yunokawa
  - Hōrai-Yachigashira Line (宝来・谷地頭線): Jujigai — Yachigashira
  - Ōmori Line (大森線): Hakodate-eki-mae — Matsukaze-cho
- Routes: There are two routes in regular service, using the above lines as follows:

■ Route 2 (2系統): Yunokawa — Matsukaze-cho — Hakodate-eki-mae — Jujigai — Yachigashira
■ Route 5 (5系統): Yunokawa — Matsukaze-cho — Hakodate-eki-mae — Jujigai — Hakodate Dock-mae

For most of the day, trams run every ten minutes on each route, or every five minutes on the section between Yunokawa and Jujigai, which is shared by both routes. After 19.00 the frequency is reduced to one tram every twenty minutes on each route, or every ten minutes on the shared section.

IC cards are accepted for payment of fares. The IC card issued by the department is the ICAS nimoca card.

=== Stations ===
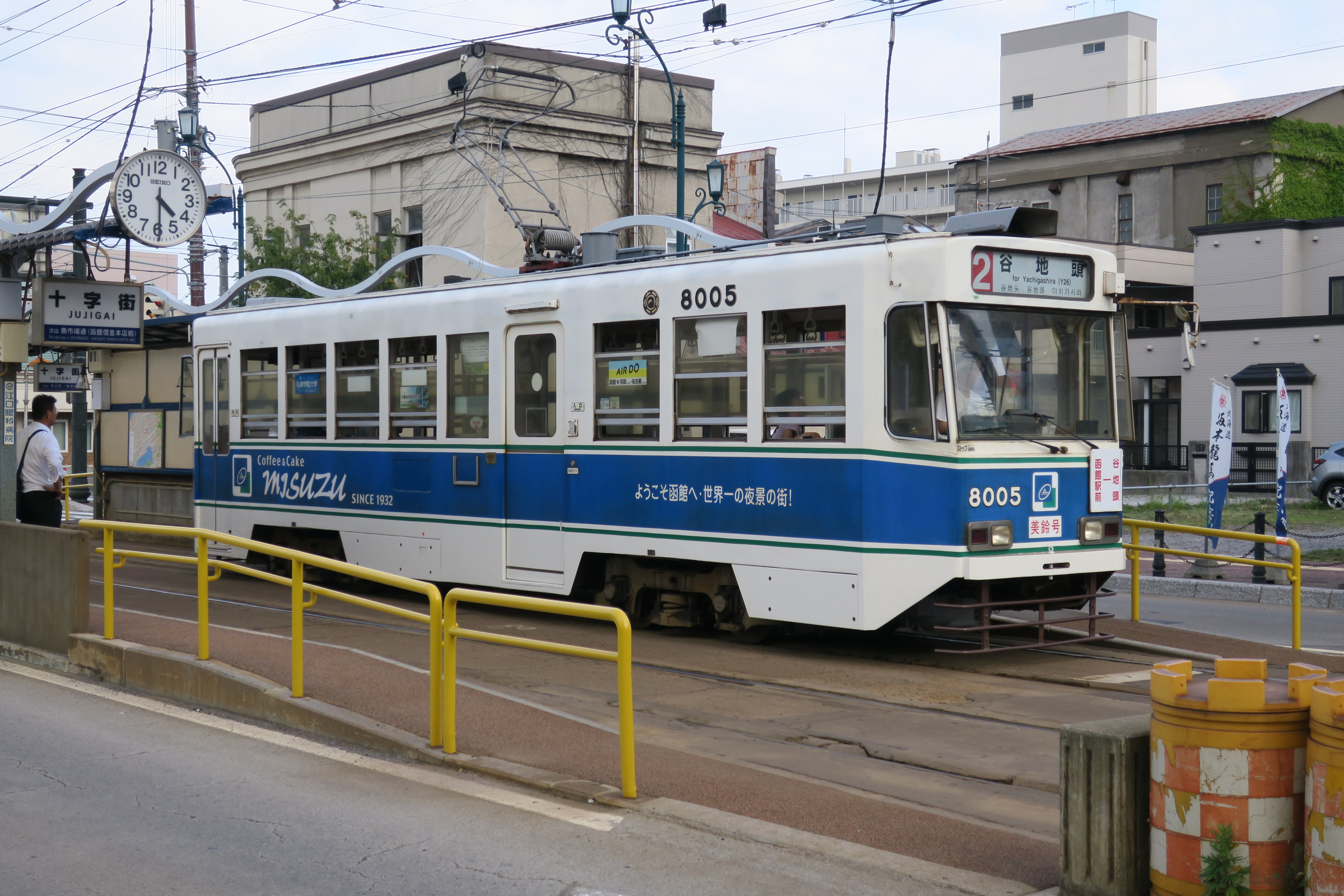
A tram at Jujigai station

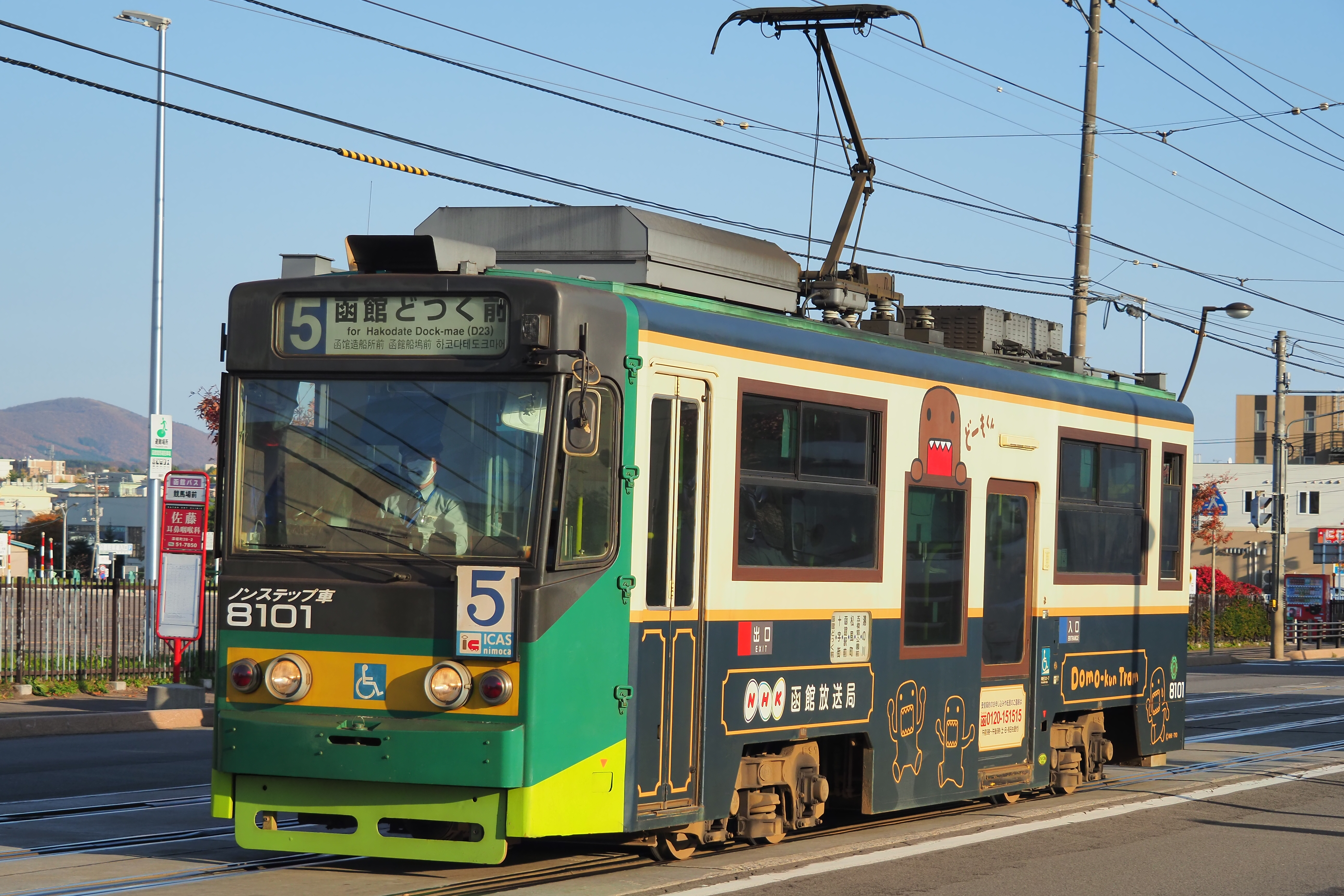
A tram at Keibajo-mae station

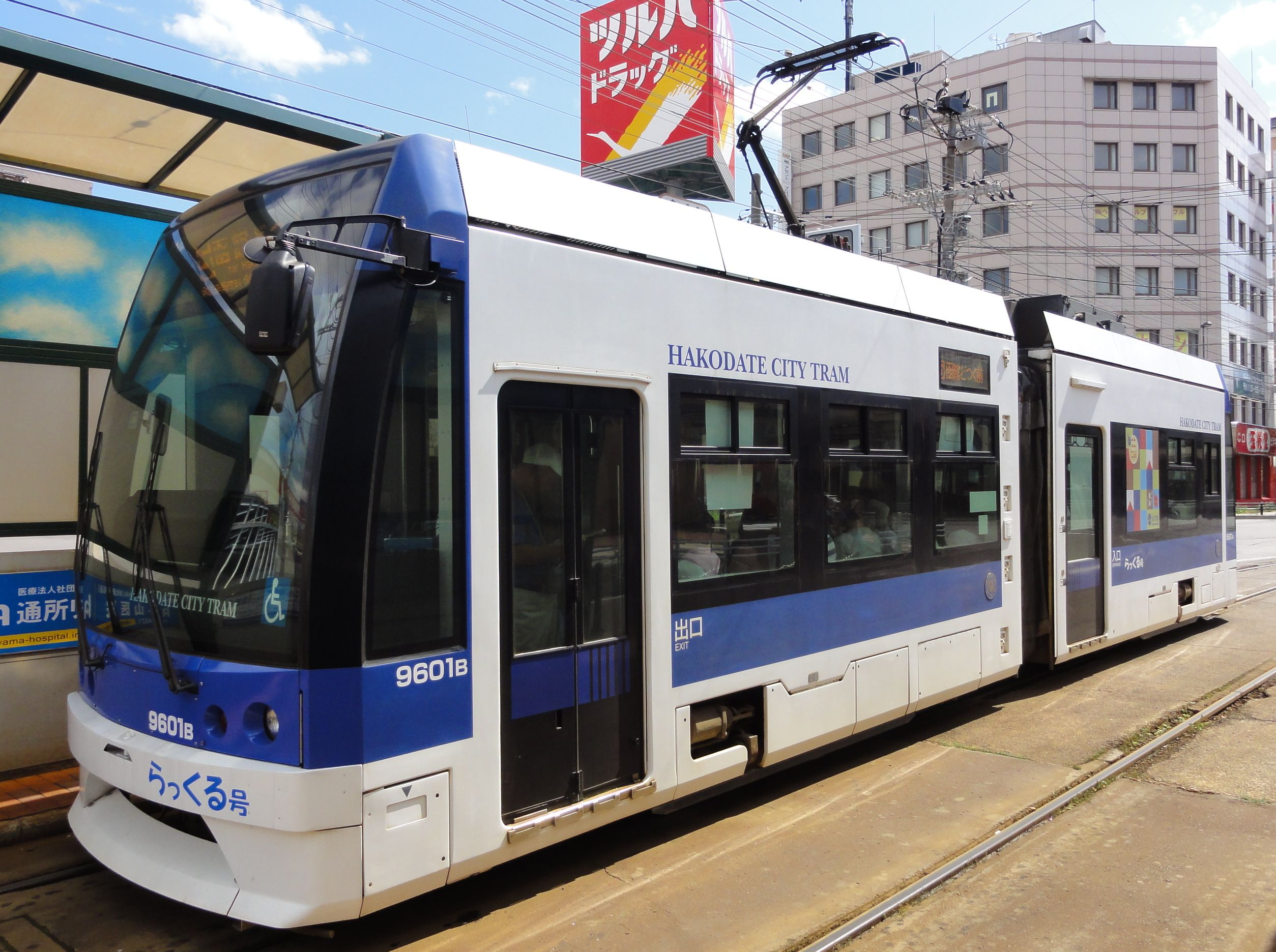
A tram at Matsukaze-cho station

Both routes run together in parallel from Yunokawa to Jujigai for 20 stations, where they split up, with three stations on each separate branch. In addition to connecting to a vaster network of bus routes criss-crossing the city, the tram system is also linked to the Hakodate Station.

#	Station Name	Routes	Nearby	Transfers
DY01	Yunokawa 湯の川		Yukura Shrine	To bus
DY02	Yunokawa-onsen 湯の川温泉			
DY03	Hakodate-arena-mae 函館アリーナ前		Hakodate Arena	
DY04	Komaba-shako-mae 駒場車庫前			
DY05	Keibajo-mae 競馬場前		Hakodate; Racecourse	To bus
DY06	Fukabori-cho 深堀町			
DY07	Kashiwagi-cho 柏木町			
DY08	Suginami-cho 杉並町			
DY09	Goryokaku-koen-mae 五稜郭公園前			To bus
DY10	Chuo-byoin-mae 中央病院前		Hakodate Central; General Hospital	
DY11	Chiyogadai 千代台		Chiyogadai Park; Athletic Studium	
DY12	Horikawa-cho 堀川町			
DY13	Showa-bashi 昭和橋			To bus
DY14	Chitose-cho 千歳町			
DY15	Shinkawa-cho 新川町			
DY16	Matsukaze-cho 松風町			
DY17	Hakodate-eki-mae 函館駅前		Hakodate Station	To bus, Hokuto train, Hakodate Main Line (rapid & local)
DY18	Shiyakusho-mae 市役所前			
DY19	Uoichiba-dori 魚市場通			
DY20	Jujigai 十字街			Route 2 (to Yachigashira); Route 5 (to Hakodate Dock-mae)
Hakodate Dock-mae Branch
D21	Suehiro-cho 末広町		Hakodate City Museum of Northern Peoples	
D22	Omachi 大町			
D23	Hakodate Dock-mae 函館どつく前		Hakodate Dock	
Yachigashira Branch
Y24	Horai-cho 宝来町			
Y25	Aoyagi-cho 青柳町		Hakodate Park	
Y26	Yachigashira 谷地頭			

=== Rolling stock ===
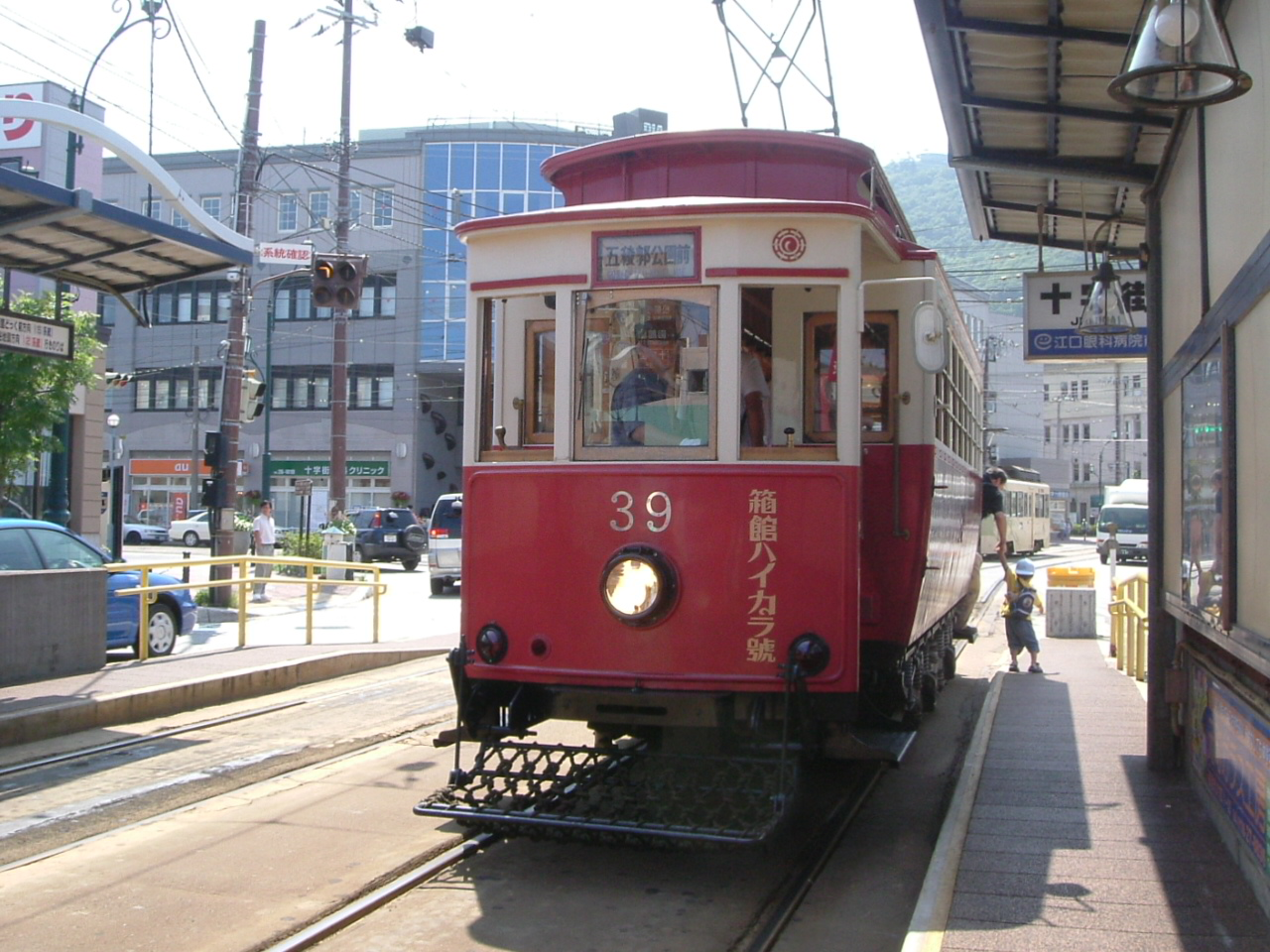
Hakodate Haikara-gō

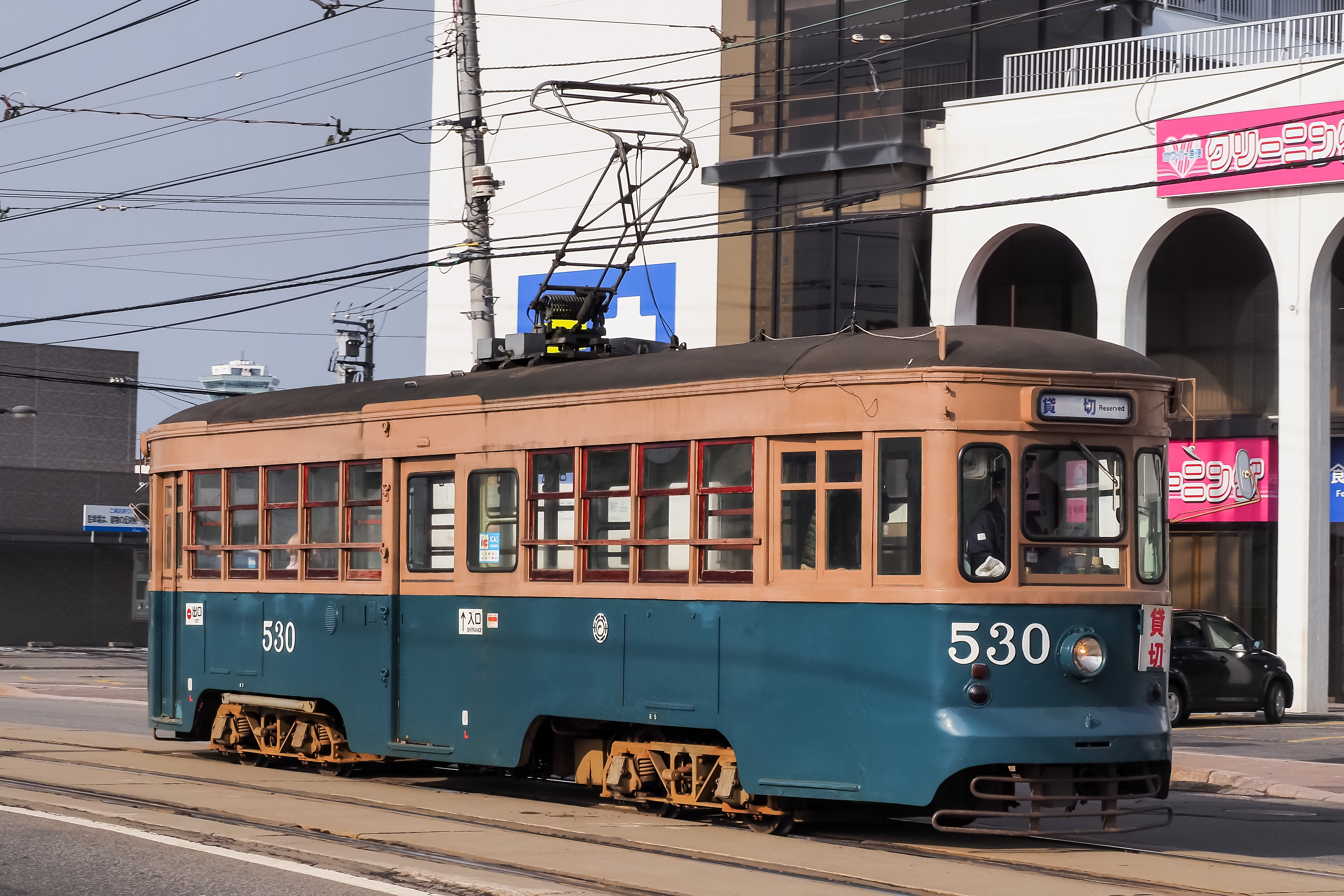
Antique car №530 that has appeared in If Cats Disappeared from the World

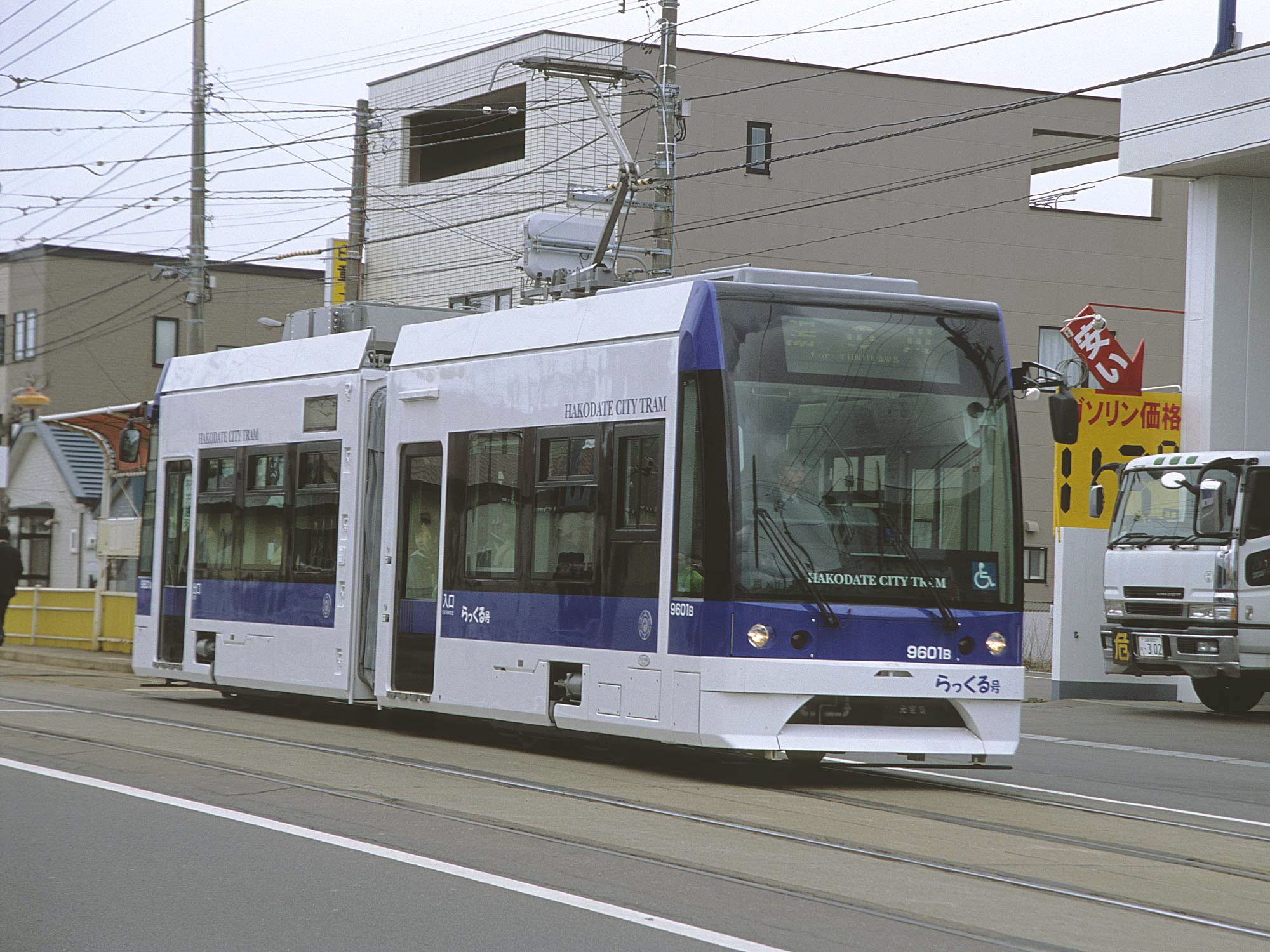
A 9600 series tramcar, known as Rakkuru-gō

As of 31 March 2023, the bureau owns 37 trams; 32 of them are used for commercial operation, three are decorated and two more are equipped with snowplows. The following types of vehicles are in use:

- Series 30, also known as Haikara-gō. It is a vintage tramcar first operated in the city in 1918 and restored for use on tourist runs in the summer in 1993.
- Series 500 was manufactured between 1948 and 1950 and gradually phased out in the 1980s, with only two vehicles in service. Furthermore, one of those, car №530, is usually kept at a depot and used for filming, plowing snow (see below) and in cases of heavy traffic
- Series 710, once the primary vehicle of the system. It is being gradually replaced, with four trams remaining. Two upgraded vehicles known as Series 7000 were introduced in 2020 and 2024, respectively.
- Series 800, first manufactured between 1962 and 1965. All but one of those were replaced by Series 8000, which are the system's primary tram. A single low-floor model of Series 8100 also exists, converted from a Series 800 model in 2002.
- Series 2000, represented by two cars introduced in 1993 and 1994, respectively.
- Series 3000, the first in Hokkaido to feature air conditioning and regenerative brakes. Those are known as Marine Blue.
- Series 9600, featuring ultra-low-floor access. The trams are known as Rakkuru-gō, and also as Little Dancer.

The following vehicles are not used for commercial purposes:

- Trams №3 and №4, also known as Sasara trams, are used for plowing snow. Six such trams were converted from regular ones in the 1930s. In addition to that, car №530 is also used for clearing snow thanks to its heavier weight.

== See also ==
- List of light-rail transit systems
- Sapporo City Transportation Bureau
