= Mount Hakodate Ropeway =

Aerial lift in Hakodate, Japan

Coordinates: 41°45′36.3″N 140°42′35″E

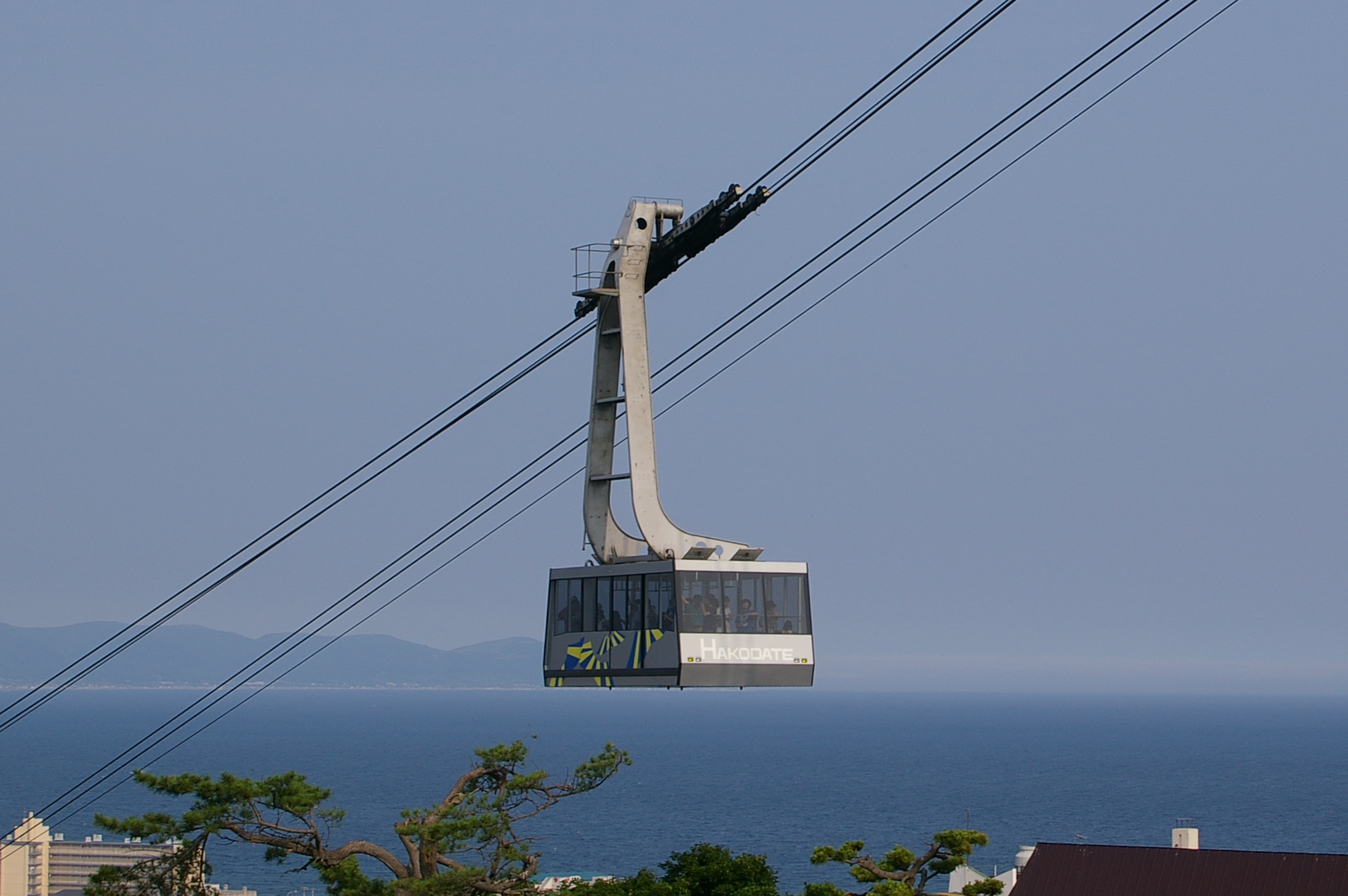
Mt. Hakodate Ropeway. The background is Tsugaru Strait.

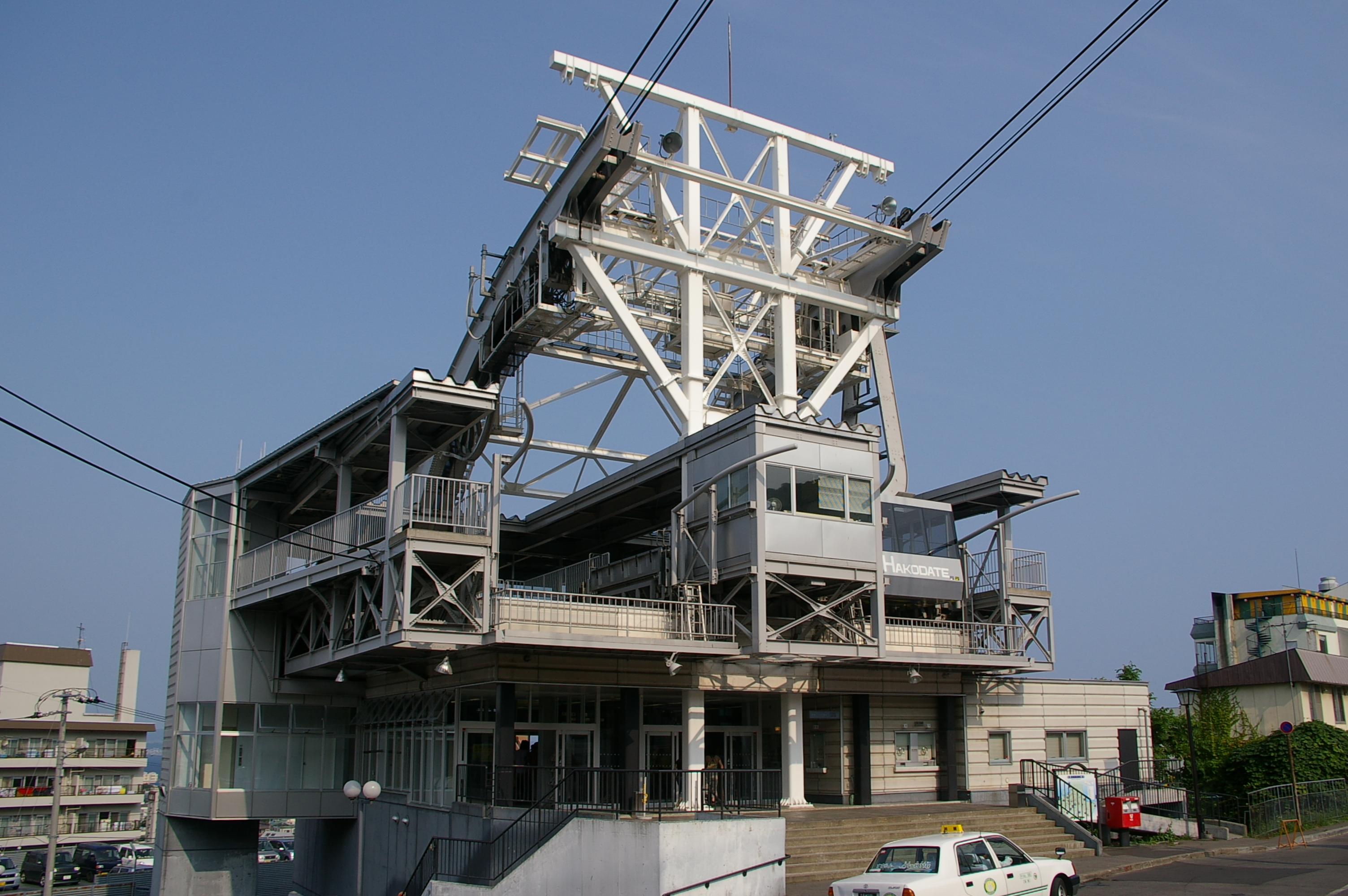
Sanroku Station.

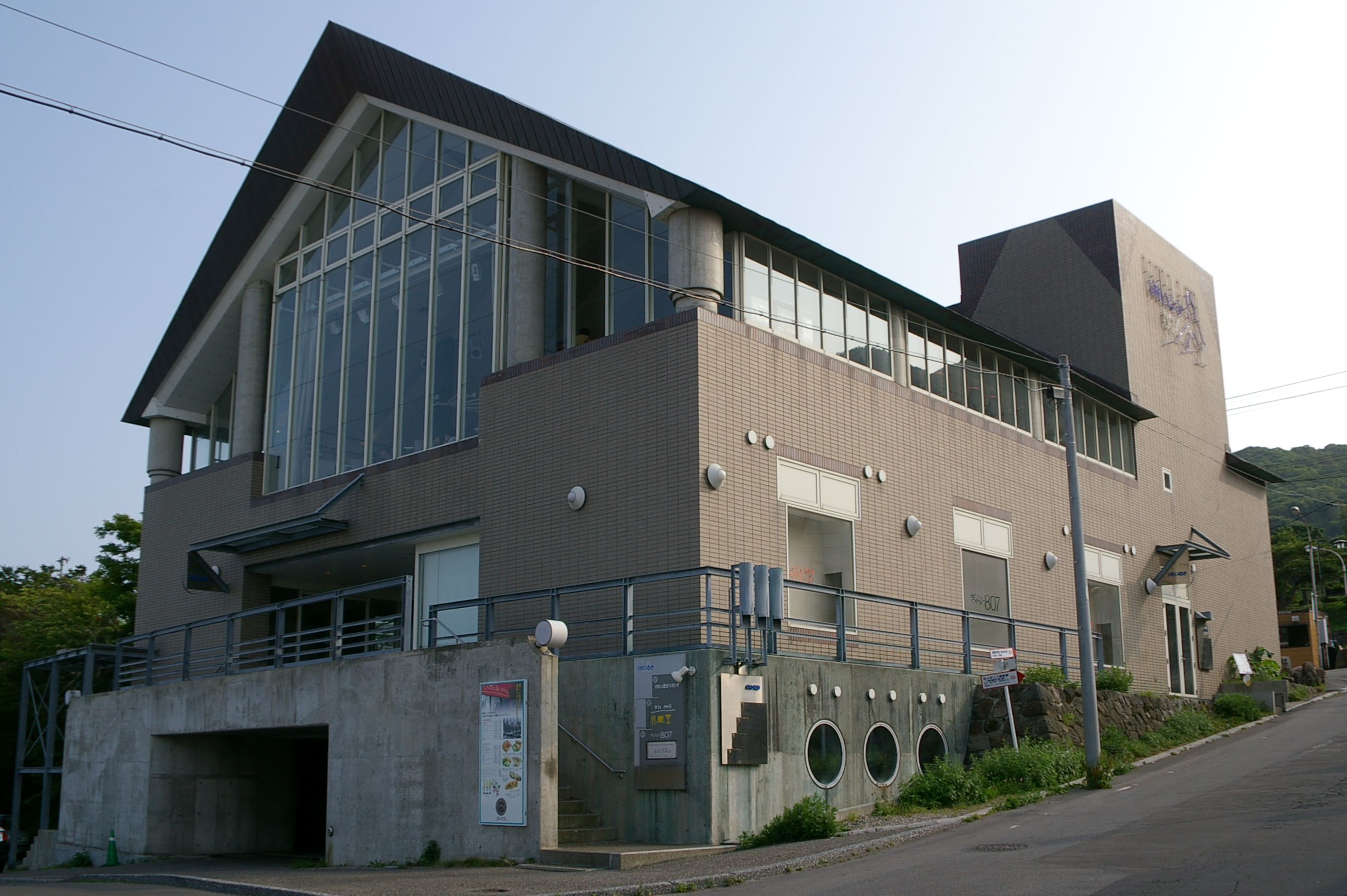
The FM Iruka studio, near Sanroku Station.

The Mt. Hakodate Ropeway (函館山ロープウェイ, Hakodateyama Rōpuwei) is the name of an aerial lift, as well as its operator. The line climbs Mount Hakodate in Hakodate, Japan. As of 2004, this is the most heavily used aerial lift line in Japan, transporting 1,559,000 riders yearly. The aerial tramway was prominently featured in Noein, a 2005 anime.

== Basic data ==
- System: Aerial tramway, 2 track cables and 1 haulage rope
- Distance: 787 m (2,582 ft)
- Vertical interval: 278 m (912 ft)
- Maximum gradient: 28°
- Operational speed: 7 m/s
- Passenger capacity: 125

== History ==
- 1958: Hakodate Tour System (函館観光事業) opened the aerial tramway line of 31 passenger capacity.
- 1959: For the benefit of tourists, the company opened an observation deck, a restaurant and a souvenir shop at the summit.
- 1965: The operator started taxi business.
- 1970: The gondolas were modified to allow 45 passenger capacity.
- 1975: The company's taxi division was spun off into a separate company.
- 1976: Hakodate Tour System changed its name to Mt. Hakodate Ropeway Corporation.
- 1978: The company opened a cafe restaurant called Motomachi Ichibankan near Sanroku Station.
- 1986: The operator became the third sector company. The line and the observation deck were modified.
- 1992: The company opened FM Iruka, the first community FM radio station in Japan.
- 1993: Cafe Pelra opened.
- 1997: New gondolas were imported from Austria.

== Services ==
Cabins operate once every 10 minutes. The whole ride takes 3 minutes. The adult fare costs ¥1,200 one-way, or ¥1,800 for a round-trip.

== Stations ==
Station name	Japanese	Distance	Elevation	Transfers	Location
Sanroku (submontane)	山麓	0 m	56 m	10 minutes walk from Jūjigai Station, Hakodate City Tram ■ Route 2 or ■ 5.	Hakodate, Hokkaidō
Sanchō (summit)	山頂	787 m	334 m		Hakodate, Hokkaidō

== See also ==
- List of aerial lifts in Japan
