= Hakodate Park =

Western-style park in Hakodate, Hokkaidō, Japan

- 函館公園
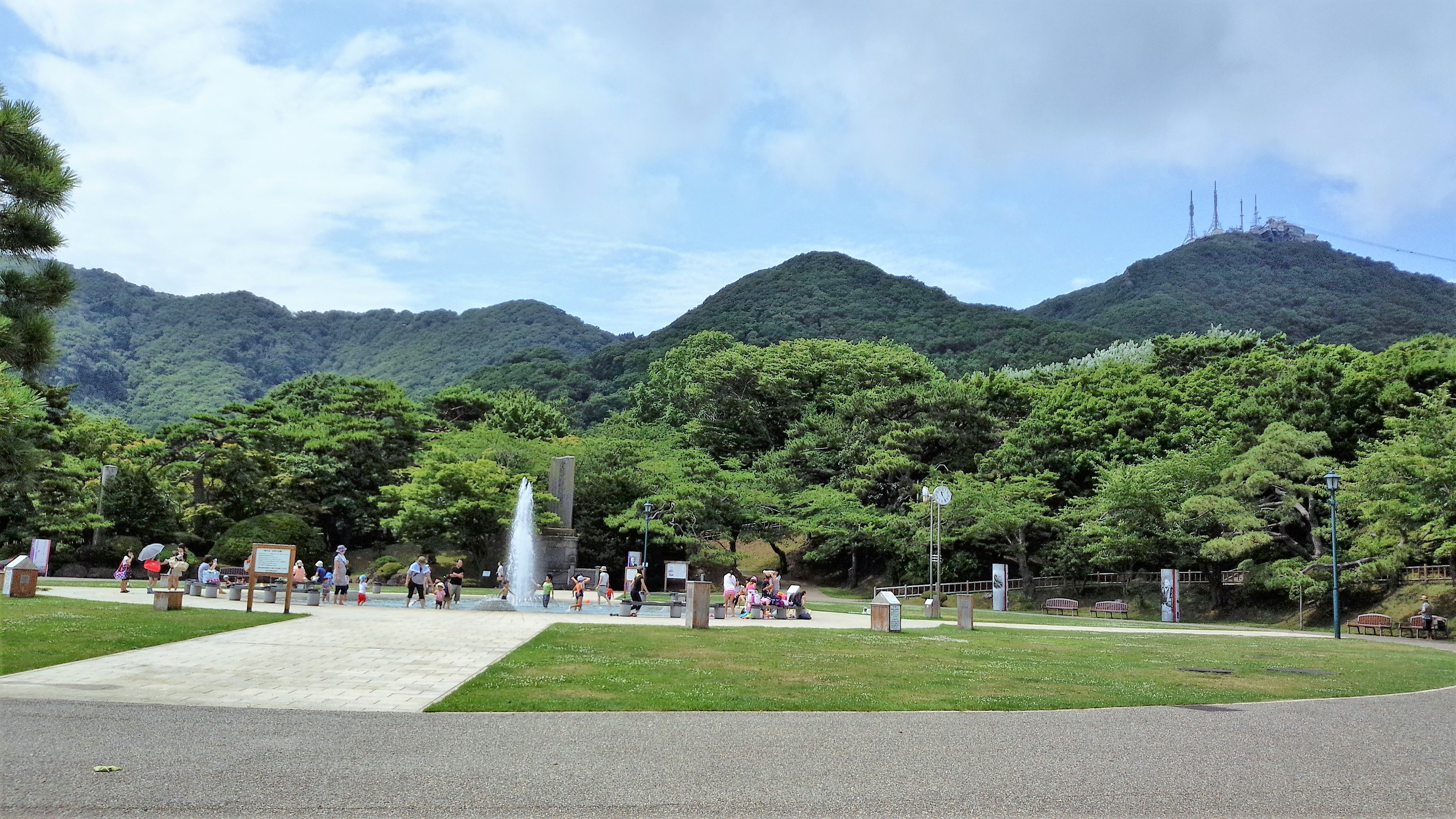
- Interactive map of Hakodate Park
- Location: Hakodate, Hokkaido, Japan
- Coordinates: 41°45′21″N 140°42′53″E
- Operator: Hakodate Housing and City Facilities Public Corporation
- Open: November 1879
- Status: Open
- Website: Official website (jp)

Hakodate Park (函館公園, Hakodate Kōen) is a large Western-style park in Hakodate, Hokkaidō, Japan, at the foot of Mount Hakodate. Opened in 1879, it is a registered as a "place of scenic beauty" in Japan's Law for the Protection of Cultural Properties. It contains the Hakodate City Museum, as well as a small zoo and children's theme park ("Kodomo no Kuni"), and is a popular site for cherry blossom viewing.

== History ==
In 1874, a simple park was established at the current site of Hakodate Park. It was not until the year leading up to 1879, however, that the park took on its current unique form through a proposal of Richard Eusden, the British Consul of Hakodate, and with the support of the citizens of Hakodate. Eusden brought the influence of European culture and early concepts of city planning, with strong involvement of the inhabitants of Hakodate. It is these unique origins that bring Hakodate Park its distinct character among public parks in Japan.

At the suggestion of Horace Capron, advisor to Japan's Hokkaidō Development Commission, a museum (Hakodate City Museum) was opened in the park in 1879. This is the oldest of all museums located in Japanese parks.

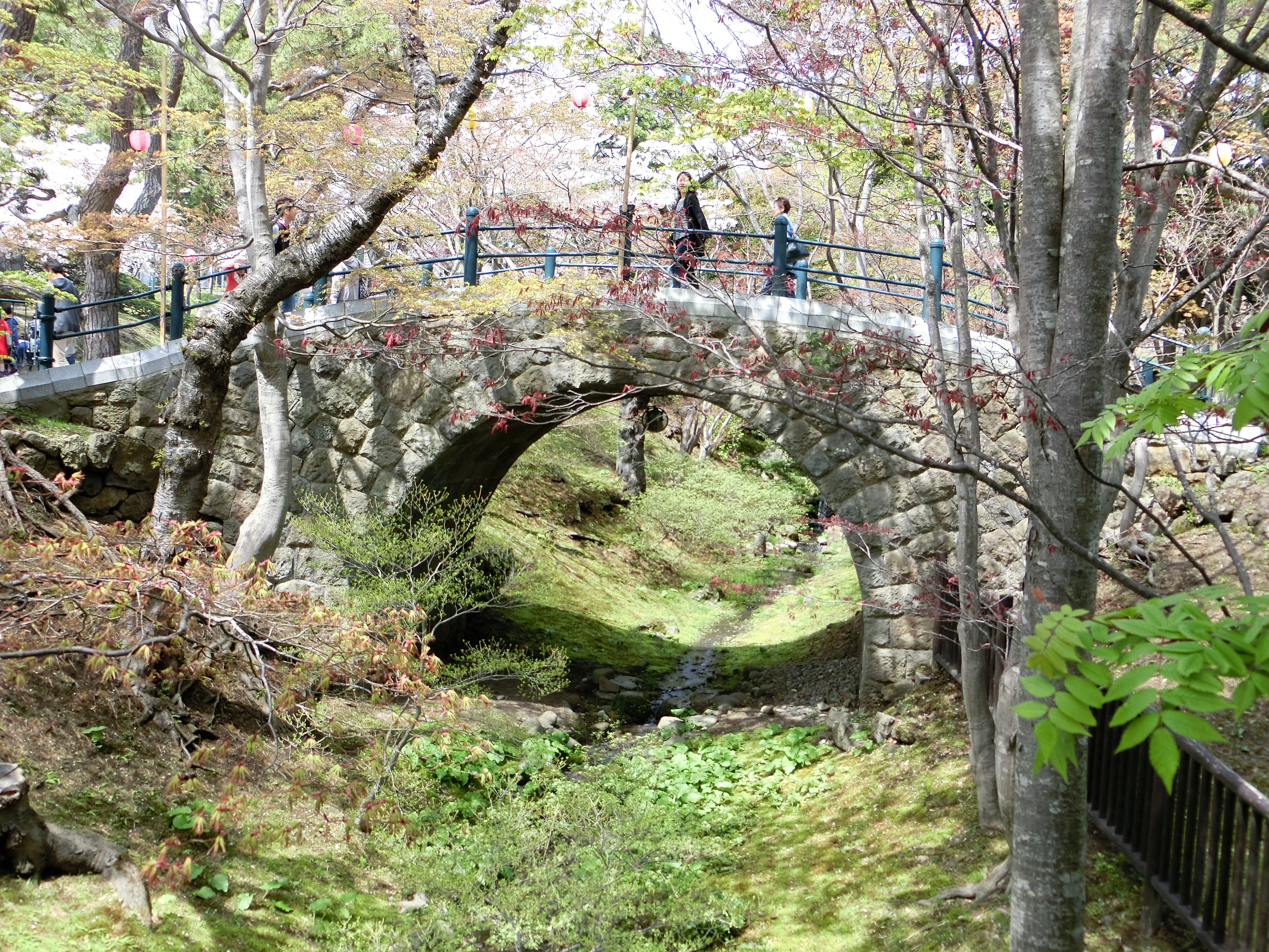
Shirakawa Bridge

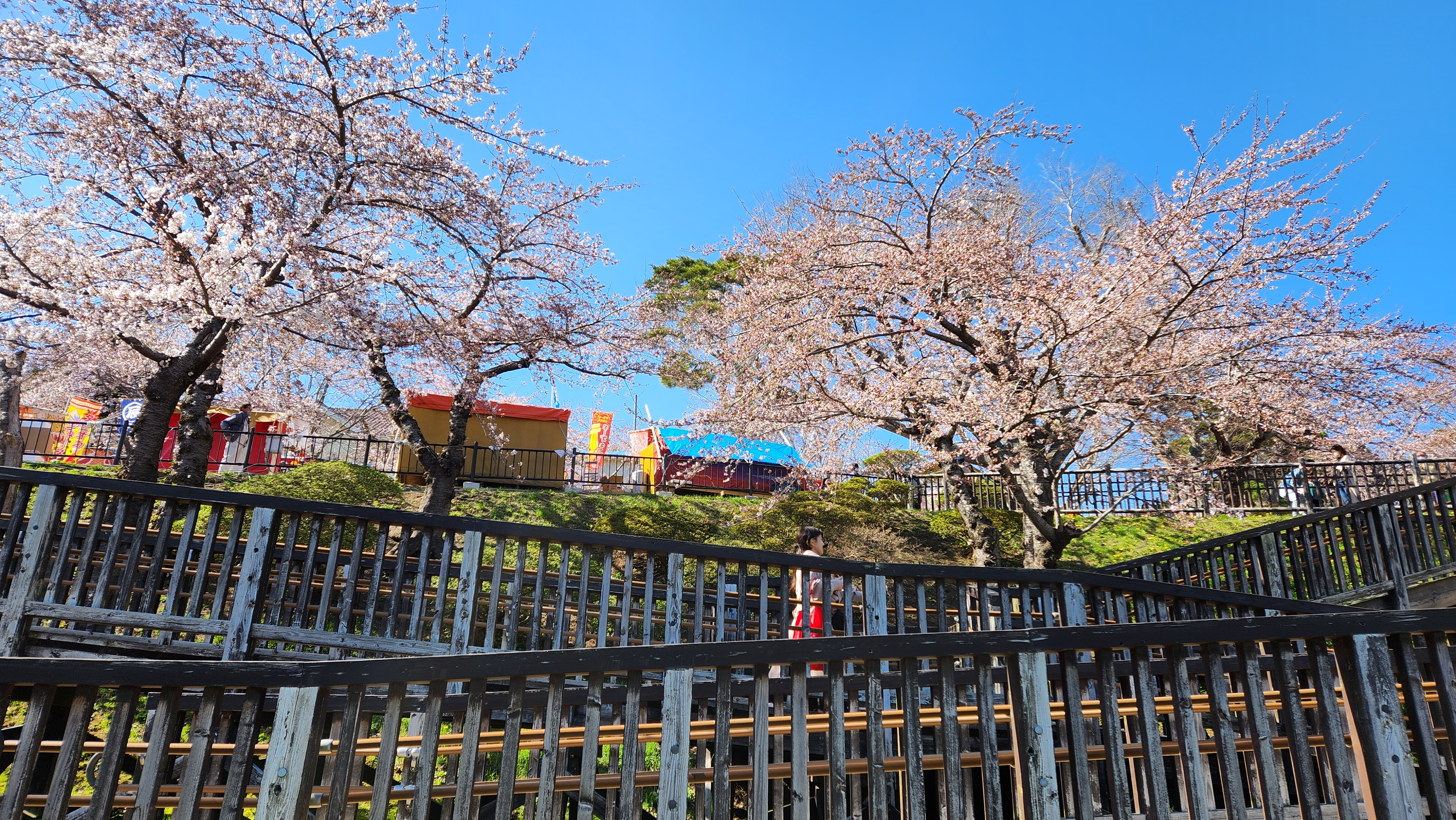
Cherry blossoms in spring

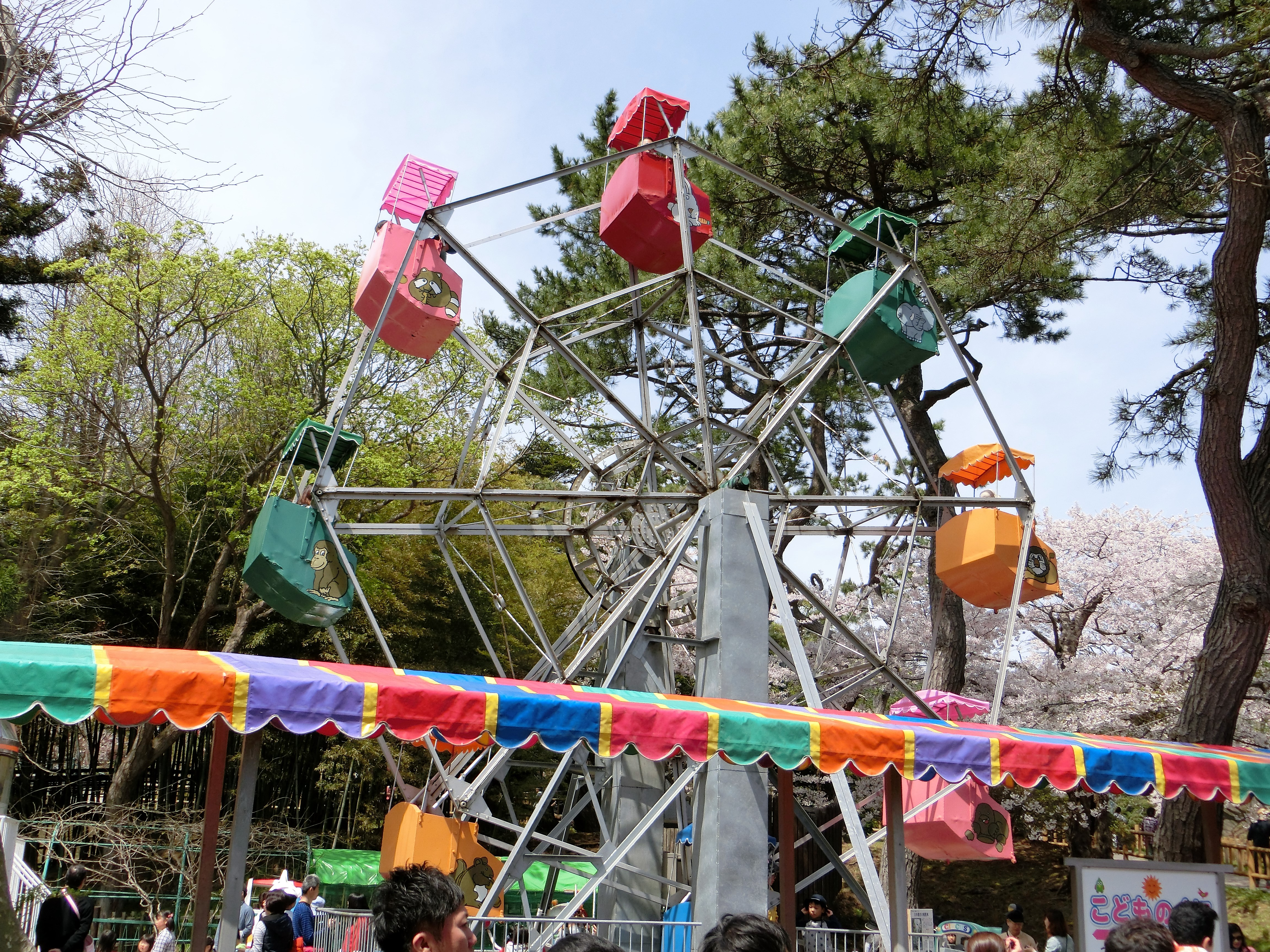
Ferris Wheel at Kodomo no Kuni theme park

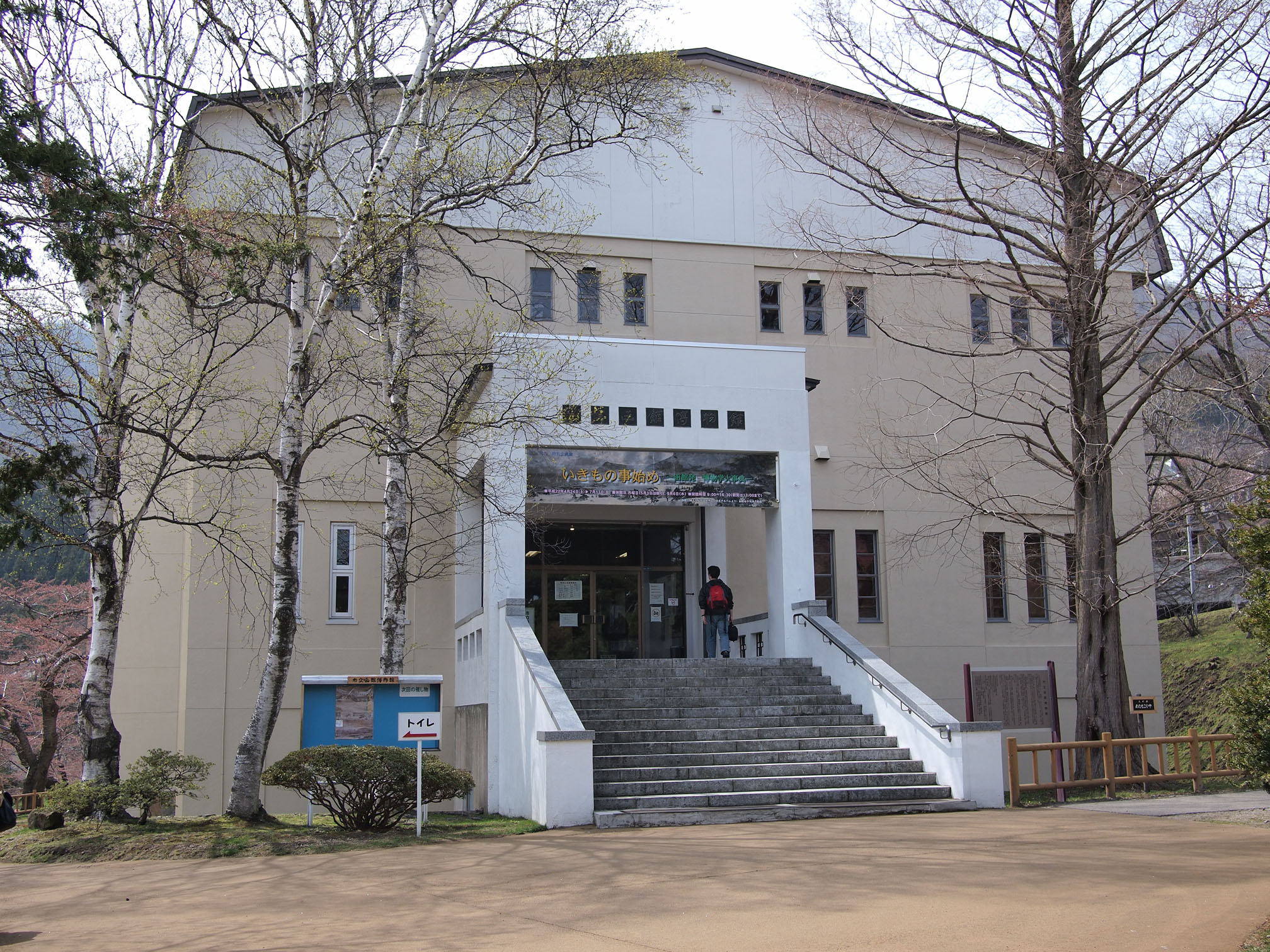
Hakodate City Museum

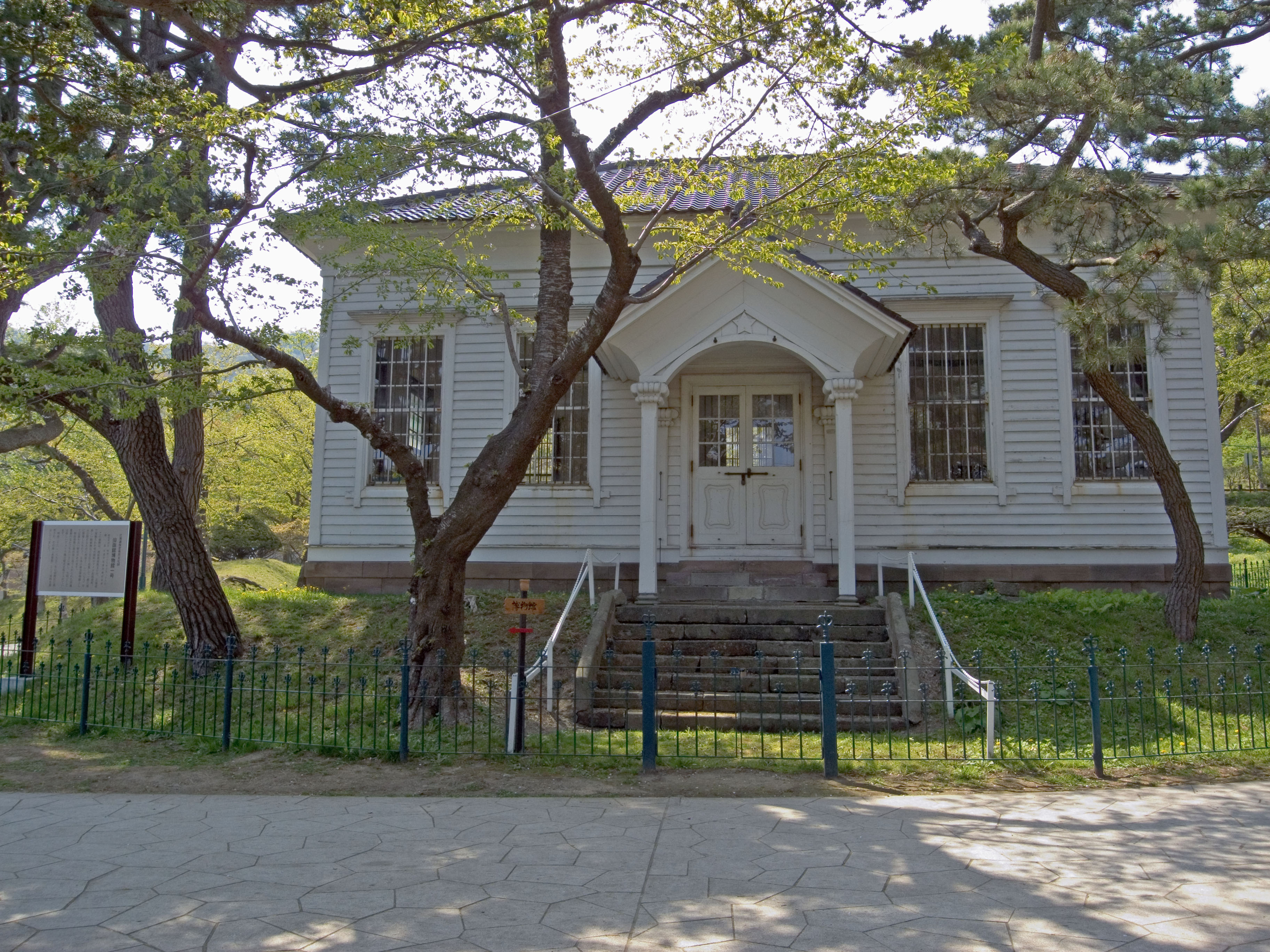
Former Hakodate Museum Building 1

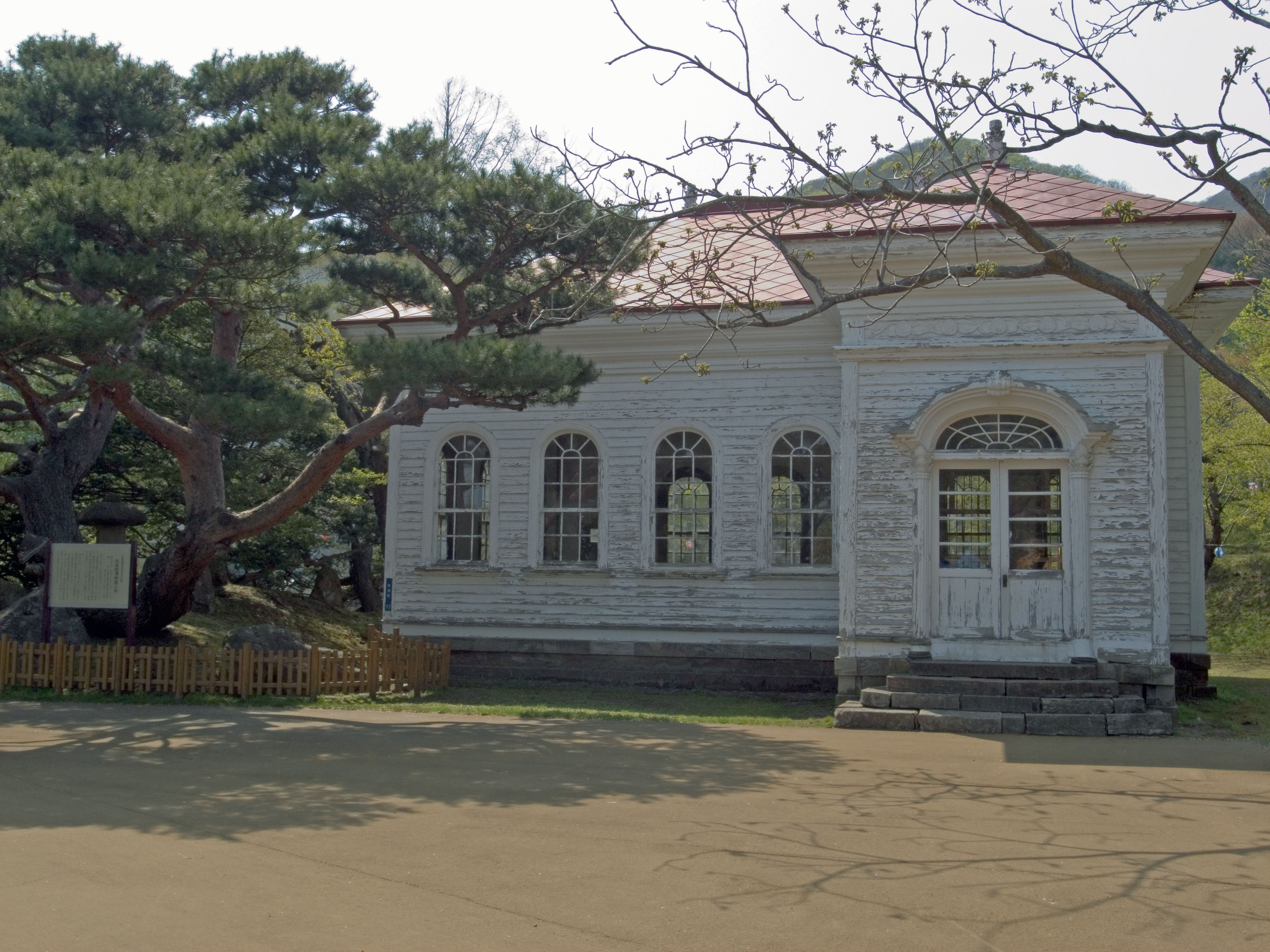
Former Hakodate Museum Building 2
