= Mount Hakodate =

Mountain in Hokkaido, Japan

- 函館山
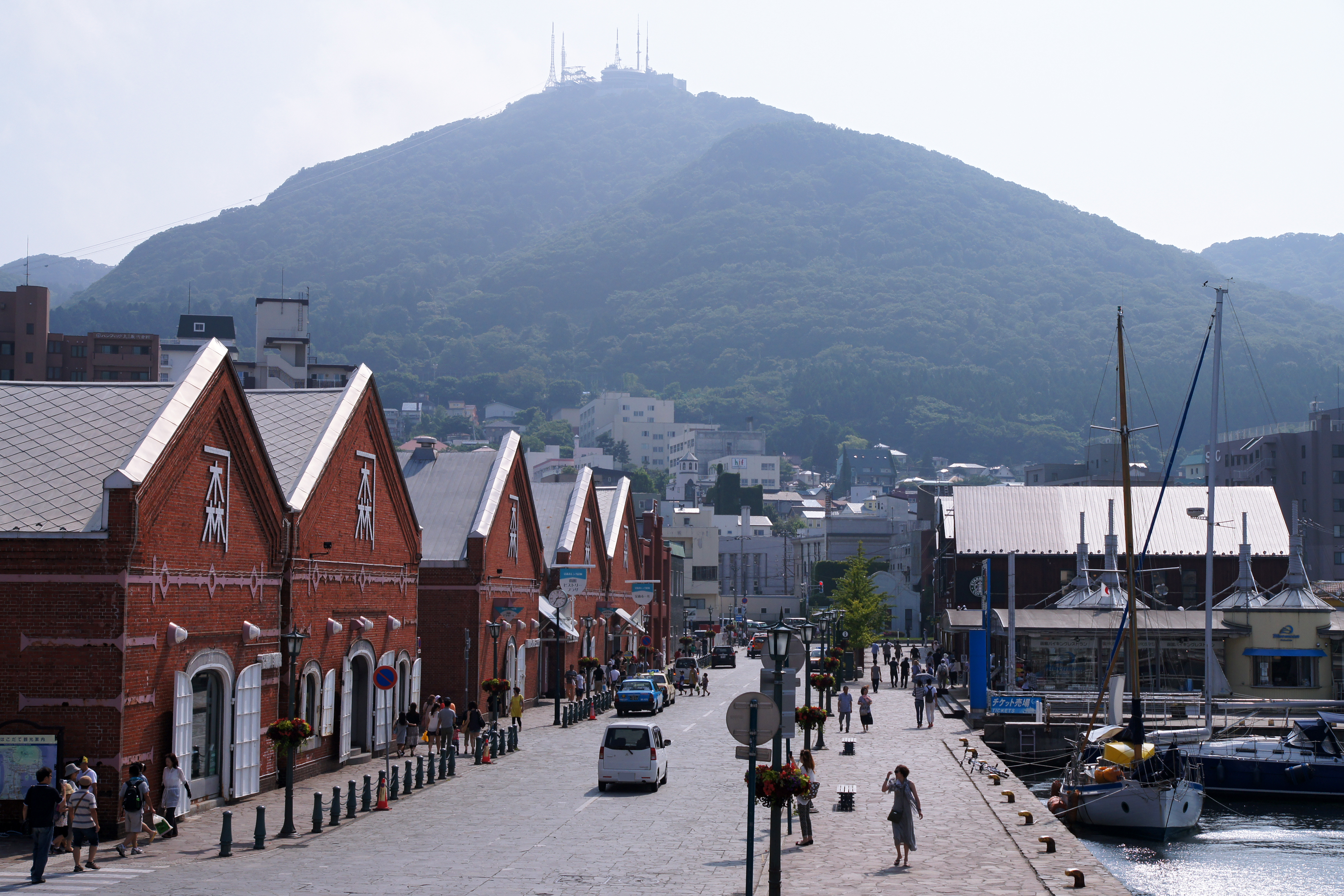
- Mount Hakodate (July 2012)

Highest point
- Elevation: 334 m (1,096 ft)
- Listing: List of mountains and hills of Japan by height
- Coordinates: 41°45′32″N 140°42′16″E

Naming
- Language of name: Japanese

Geography
- Location within Hokkaido
- Location: Hokkaidō, Japan
- Parent range: Oshima Peninsula
- Topo map(s): Geographical Survey Institute 25000:1 函館; 50000:1 函館

Climbing
- Easiest route: Mount Hakodate Ropeway

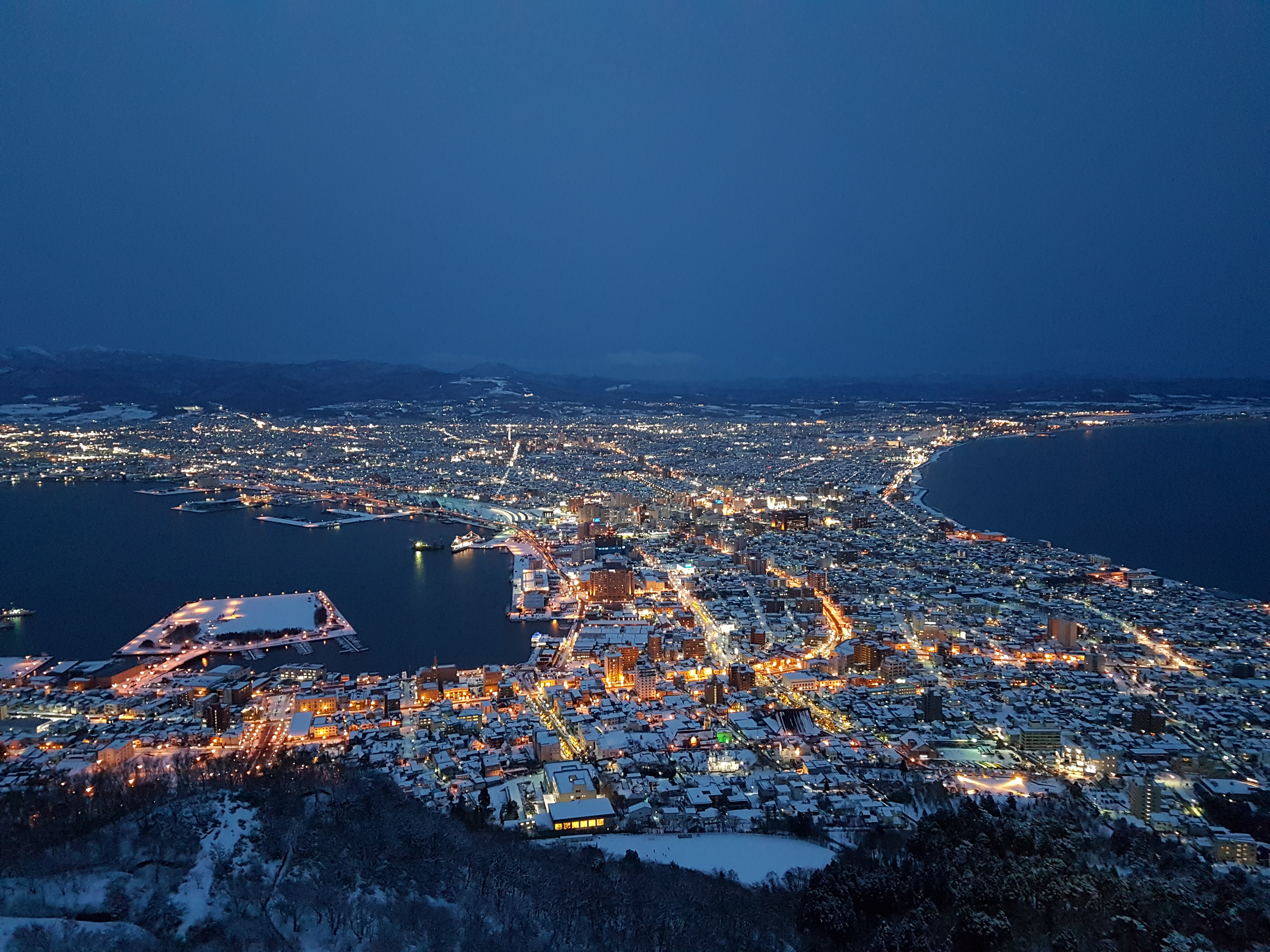
View of Hakodate city from Mount Hakodate

Mount Hakodate (函館山, Hakodate-yama) is an inactive volcanic mountain in Hakodate, Hokkaidō, Japan.

The mountain is renowned for its view of the surrounding bay and city. The Michelin Green Guide: Japan gave the experience 3/3 stars in a review, placing it on par with mountain views of Naples and Hong Kong. The peak is accessible by hiking or by bike, as well as via a regular cable car service.

== Geology ==
Mount Hakodate is a volcanic mountain that was once separated from the mainland. Around 3,000 years ago, a sandbar connected the island to the mainland of Hokkaido, creating an isthmus called a tombolo on which downtown Hakodate is now located. The sandbar made Mount Hakodate a tied island.

== See also ==
- Mount Hakodate Ropeway
