= Hakodate Arena =

Arena in Hakodate, Hokkaido, Japan

Coordinates: 41°46′55″N 140°47′00″E

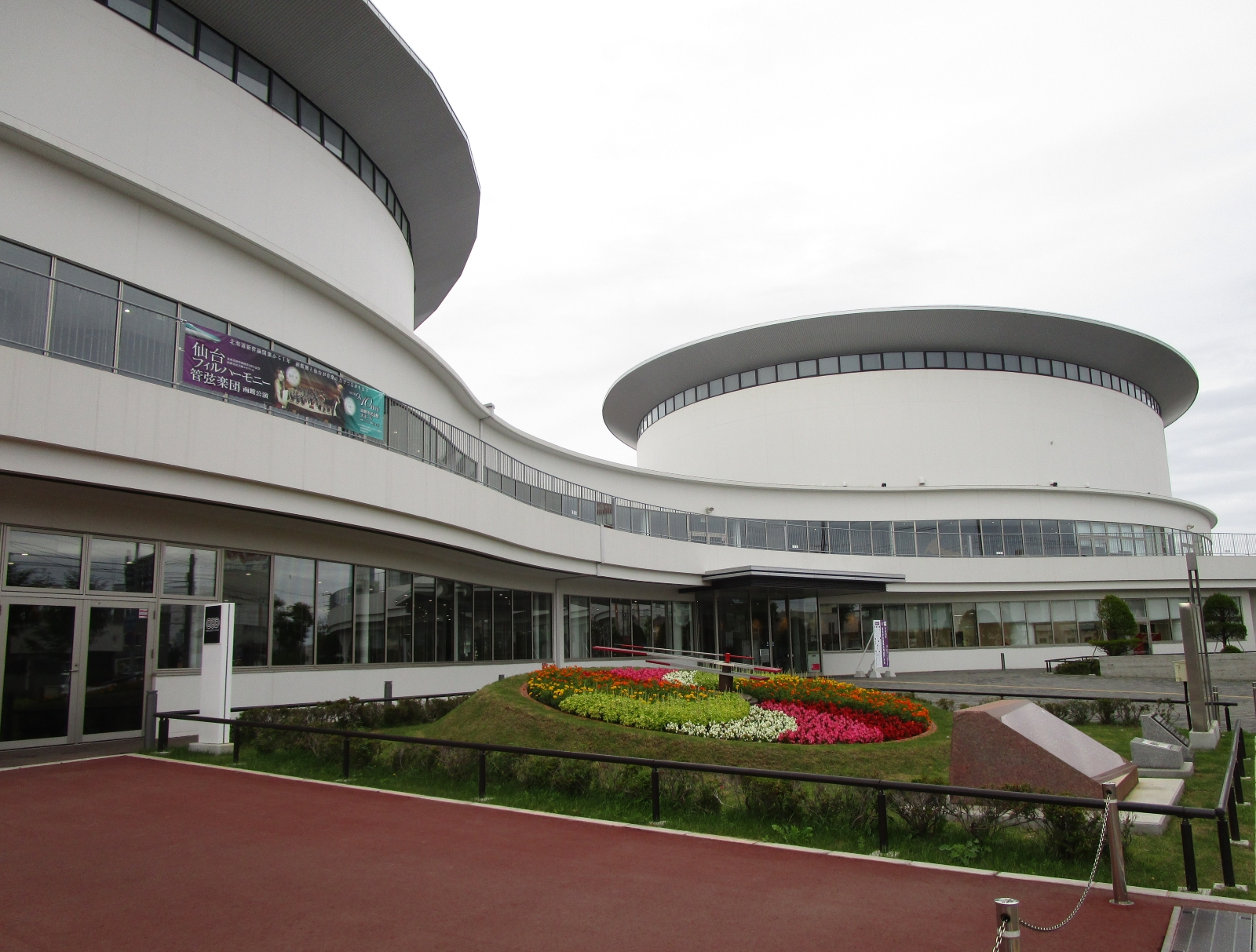

- Location within Hokkaido Location within Japan
- Interactive map of Hakodate Arena
- Full name: Hakodate Arena
- Location: Hakodate, Hokkaido, Japan
- Owner: Hakodate city
- Operator: Hakodate city
- Capacity: 5,000
- Parking: 287 spaces

Construction
- Opened: July 2015
- Cost: JPY 4.6 billion
- Main contractor: Sato Kogyo

Hakodate Arena is an arena in Hakodate, Hokkaido, Japan.

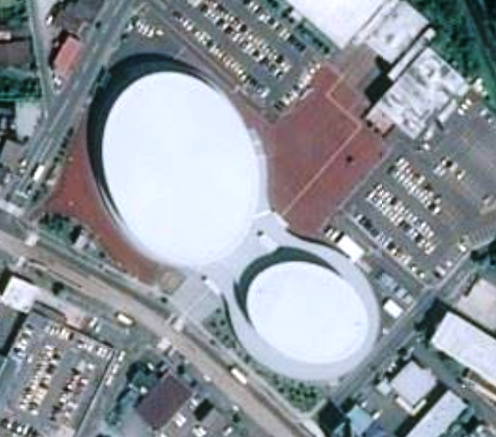
Satellite view
