= List of minor planets: 571001–572000 =

The following is a partial list of minor planets, running from minor-planet number 571001 through 572000, inclusive. The primary data for this and other partial lists is based on JPL's "Small-Body Orbital Elements" and data available from the Minor Planet Center. Critical list information is also provided by the MPC, unless otherwise specified from Lowell Observatory. A detailed description of the table's columns and additional sources are given on the main page including a complete list of every page in this series, and a statistical break-up on the dynamical classification of minor planets.

Also see the summary list of all named bodies in numerical and alphabetical order, and the corresponding naming citations for the number range of this particular list. New namings may only be added to this list after official publication, as the preannouncement of names is condemned by the Working Group for Small Bodies Nomenclature of the International Astronomical Union.

| Near-Earth obj. | MBA (inner) | MBA (outer) | Centaur |
| Mars-crosser | MBA (middle) | Jupiter trojan | Trans-Neptunian obj. |
| Unclassified |

== 571001–571100 ==
| Designation | | | Discovery | | | Properties | | Ref |
| Permanent | Provisional | Named after | Date | Site | Discoverer(s) | Category | Diam. | Ref |
|---|---|---|---|---|---|---|---|---|
| 571001 | 2006 YF_{50} | — | December 27, 2006 | Mount Lemmon | Mount Lemmon Survey | URS | 3.0 km | MPC · JPL |
| 571002 | 2006 YG_{50} | — | December 27, 2006 | Mount Lemmon | Mount Lemmon Survey | · | 2.4 km | MPC · JPL |
| 571003 | 2006 YJ_{50} | — | October 29, 2005 | Kitt Peak | Spacewatch | · | 2.6 km | MPC · JPL |
| 571004 | 2006 YR_{55} | — | November 22, 2006 | Kitt Peak | Spacewatch | · | 670 m | MPC · JPL |
| 571005 | 2006 YR_{56} | — | December 15, 2006 | Mount Lemmon | Mount Lemmon Survey | TIR | 3.7 km | MPC · JPL |
| 571006 | 2006 YG_{57} | — | December 14, 2012 | ESA OGS | ESA OGS | · | 3.2 km | MPC · JPL |
| 571007 | 2006 YM_{57} | — | November 25, 2006 | Mount Lemmon | Mount Lemmon Survey | HYG | 2.5 km | MPC · JPL |
| 571008 | 2006 YS_{57} | — | February 9, 2008 | Kitt Peak | Spacewatch | · | 2.5 km | MPC · JPL |
| 571009 | 2006 YV_{57} | — | October 24, 2011 | Haleakala | Pan-STARRS 1 | · | 2.8 km | MPC · JPL |
| 571010 | 2006 YK_{58} | — | May 9, 2003 | Anderson Mesa | LONEOS | JUN | 930 m | MPC · JPL |
| 571011 | 2006 YJ_{59} | — | May 8, 2008 | Kitt Peak | Spacewatch | · | 950 m | MPC · JPL |
| 571012 | 2006 YK_{59} | — | December 23, 2012 | Haleakala | Pan-STARRS 1 | EOS | 1.8 km | MPC · JPL |
| 571013 | 2006 YM_{59} | — | December 11, 2012 | Mount Lemmon | Mount Lemmon Survey | · | 2.5 km | MPC · JPL |
| 571014 | 2006 YH_{60} | — | October 26, 2011 | Haleakala | Pan-STARRS 1 | · | 2.7 km | MPC · JPL |
| 571015 | 2006 YL_{60} | — | December 24, 2006 | Kitt Peak | Spacewatch | MAR | 1.0 km | MPC · JPL |
| 571016 | 2006 YN_{60} | — | December 21, 2006 | Kitt Peak | L. H. Wasserman, M. W. Buie | · | 560 m | MPC · JPL |
| 571017 | 2006 YR_{60} | — | November 5, 2010 | Kitt Peak | Spacewatch | · | 960 m | MPC · JPL |
| 571018 | 2006 YQ_{61} | — | December 24, 2006 | Kitt Peak | Spacewatch | · | 1.2 km | MPC · JPL |
| 571019 | 2006 YP_{62} | — | December 26, 2006 | Kitt Peak | Spacewatch | · | 970 m | MPC · JPL |
| 571020 | 2006 YX_{62} | — | January 14, 2011 | Kitt Peak | Spacewatch | · | 1.3 km | MPC · JPL |
| 571021 | 2006 YN_{63} | — | December 23, 2012 | Haleakala | Pan-STARRS 1 | (895) | 2.7 km | MPC · JPL |
| 571022 | 2006 YW_{63} | — | February 18, 2013 | Mount Lemmon | Mount Lemmon Survey | · | 2.5 km | MPC · JPL |
| 571023 | 2006 YU_{64} | — | November 18, 2011 | Mount Lemmon | Mount Lemmon Survey | VER | 2.5 km | MPC · JPL |
| 571024 | 2006 YY_{64} | — | December 27, 2006 | Kitt Peak | Spacewatch | · | 2.1 km | MPC · JPL |
| 571025 | 2006 YC_{65} | — | November 3, 2011 | Mount Lemmon | Mount Lemmon Survey | · | 2.8 km | MPC · JPL |
| 571026 | 2006 YJ_{65} | — | September 24, 2011 | Haleakala | Pan-STARRS 1 | · | 2.0 km | MPC · JPL |
| 571027 | 2006 YS_{65} | — | December 21, 2006 | Kitt Peak | Spacewatch | · | 2.9 km | MPC · JPL |
| 571028 | 2006 YW_{65} | — | February 13, 2008 | Mount Lemmon | Mount Lemmon Survey | THM | 2.1 km | MPC · JPL |
| 571029 | 2006 YX_{65} | — | January 20, 2013 | Mount Lemmon | Mount Lemmon Survey | · | 2.5 km | MPC · JPL |
| 571030 | 2006 YT_{66} | — | June 5, 2016 | Haleakala | Pan-STARRS 1 | · | 1.1 km | MPC · JPL |
| 571031 | 2006 YP_{67} | — | December 27, 2006 | Mount Lemmon | Mount Lemmon Survey | · | 3.1 km | MPC · JPL |
| 571032 | 2006 YS_{67} | — | December 27, 2006 | Mount Lemmon | Mount Lemmon Survey | · | 1.9 km | MPC · JPL |
| 571033 | 2006 YT_{67} | — | December 26, 2006 | Kitt Peak | Spacewatch | · | 1.9 km | MPC · JPL |
| 571034 | 2007 AL_{5} | — | December 24, 2006 | Kitt Peak | Spacewatch | · | 2.1 km | MPC · JPL |
| 571035 | 2007 AC_{7} | — | December 27, 2006 | Mount Lemmon | Mount Lemmon Survey | · | 3.3 km | MPC · JPL |
| 571036 | 2007 AD_{9} | — | January 11, 2007 | Calar Alto | J. L. Ortiz, Santos-Sanz, P. | · | 850 m | MPC · JPL |
| 571037 | 2007 AP_{9} | — | December 24, 2006 | Kitt Peak | Spacewatch | · | 3.5 km | MPC · JPL |
| 571038 | 2007 AT_{24} | — | January 15, 2007 | Catalina | CSS | · | 1.3 km | MPC · JPL |
| 571039 | 2007 AU_{26} | — | October 30, 2005 | Mount Lemmon | Mount Lemmon Survey | · | 2.4 km | MPC · JPL |
| 571040 | 2007 AS_{31} | — | January 8, 2007 | Mount Lemmon | Mount Lemmon Survey | · | 2.2 km | MPC · JPL |
| 571041 | 2007 AU_{31} | — | January 10, 2007 | Mount Lemmon | Mount Lemmon Survey | · | 940 m | MPC · JPL |
| 571042 | 2007 AF_{32} | — | December 27, 2006 | Mount Lemmon | Mount Lemmon Survey | · | 750 m | MPC · JPL |
| 571043 | 2007 AP_{32} | — | January 10, 2007 | Mount Lemmon | Mount Lemmon Survey | · | 3.6 km | MPC · JPL |
| 571044 | 2007 AF_{33} | — | December 15, 2006 | Kitt Peak | Spacewatch | · | 1.3 km | MPC · JPL |
| 571045 | 2007 AG_{33} | — | May 10, 2015 | Mount Lemmon | Mount Lemmon Survey | · | 3.1 km | MPC · JPL |
| 571046 | 2007 AQ_{33} | — | January 10, 2007 | Mount Lemmon | Mount Lemmon Survey | · | 1.1 km | MPC · JPL |
| 571047 | 2007 AJ_{34} | — | January 15, 2007 | Mauna Kea | P. A. Wiegert | · | 540 m | MPC · JPL |
| 571048 | 2007 AM_{34} | — | September 5, 2016 | Mount Lemmon | Mount Lemmon Survey | · | 2.7 km | MPC · JPL |
| 571049 | 2007 AN_{35} | — | January 10, 2007 | Kitt Peak | Spacewatch | · | 1.3 km | MPC · JPL |
| 571050 | 2007 AR_{36} | — | January 10, 2007 | Kitt Peak | Spacewatch | · | 460 m | MPC · JPL |
| 571051 | 2007 AW_{36} | — | January 9, 2007 | Kitt Peak | Spacewatch | MAR | 710 m | MPC · JPL |
| 571052 | 2007 BP_{1} | — | November 17, 2006 | Mount Lemmon | Mount Lemmon Survey | · | 2.5 km | MPC · JPL |
| 571053 | 2007 BA_{2} | — | January 16, 2007 | Mount Lemmon | Mount Lemmon Survey | · | 3.1 km | MPC · JPL |
| 571054 | 2007 BW_{7} | — | December 13, 2006 | Kitt Peak | Spacewatch | · | 1.5 km | MPC · JPL |
| 571055 | 2007 BB_{9} | — | January 9, 2007 | Kitt Peak | Spacewatch | · | 1.1 km | MPC · JPL |
| 571056 | 2007 BA_{10} | — | January 17, 2007 | Kitt Peak | Spacewatch | · | 1.3 km | MPC · JPL |
| 571057 | 2007 BA_{15} | — | January 17, 2007 | Kitt Peak | Spacewatch | · | 1.3 km | MPC · JPL |
| 571058 | 2007 BK_{25} | — | January 24, 2007 | Mount Lemmon | Mount Lemmon Survey | · | 2.3 km | MPC · JPL |
| 571059 | 2007 BS_{25} | — | January 24, 2007 | Mount Lemmon | Mount Lemmon Survey | · | 1.1 km | MPC · JPL |
| 571060 | 2007 BC_{30} | — | January 17, 2007 | Kitt Peak | Spacewatch | · | 1.5 km | MPC · JPL |
| 571061 | 2007 BQ_{32} | — | January 9, 2007 | Mount Lemmon | Mount Lemmon Survey | · | 3.3 km | MPC · JPL |
| 571062 | 2007 BF_{33} | — | January 24, 2007 | Mount Lemmon | Mount Lemmon Survey | · | 1.9 km | MPC · JPL |
| 571063 | 2007 BN_{44} | — | January 25, 2007 | Kitt Peak | Spacewatch | · | 1.0 km | MPC · JPL |
| 571064 | 2007 BT_{50} | — | January 24, 2007 | Mount Lemmon | Mount Lemmon Survey | · | 2.9 km | MPC · JPL |
| 571065 | 2007 BL_{61} | — | January 27, 2007 | Mount Lemmon | Mount Lemmon Survey | · | 2.5 km | MPC · JPL |
| 571066 | 2007 BS_{65} | — | January 27, 2007 | Mount Lemmon | Mount Lemmon Survey | · | 2.8 km | MPC · JPL |
| 571067 | 2007 BM_{67} | — | January 27, 2007 | Mount Lemmon | Mount Lemmon Survey | H | 420 m | MPC · JPL |
| 571068 | 2007 BO_{71} | — | January 28, 2007 | Mount Lemmon | Mount Lemmon Survey | · | 2.5 km | MPC · JPL |
| 571069 | 2007 BH_{73} | — | January 16, 2007 | Socorro | LINEAR | T_{j} (2.98) | 3.9 km | MPC · JPL |
| 571070 | 2007 BQ_{79} | — | January 28, 2007 | Mount Lemmon | Mount Lemmon Survey | · | 600 m | MPC · JPL |
| 571071 | 2007 BF_{86} | — | January 19, 2007 | Mauna Kea | P. A. Wiegert | · | 1.1 km | MPC · JPL |
| 571072 | 2007 BZ_{94} | — | December 27, 2006 | Mount Lemmon | Mount Lemmon Survey | · | 1.4 km | MPC · JPL |
| 571073 | 2007 BX_{96} | — | February 21, 2007 | Mount Lemmon | Mount Lemmon Survey | · | 910 m | MPC · JPL |
| 571074 | 2007 BP_{99} | — | December 27, 2006 | Mount Lemmon | Mount Lemmon Survey | (5) | 1.1 km | MPC · JPL |
| 571075 | 2007 BC_{100} | — | December 21, 2006 | Kitt Peak | L. H. Wasserman, M. W. Buie | · | 3.9 km | MPC · JPL |
| 571076 | 2007 BD_{104} | — | January 27, 2007 | Mount Lemmon | Mount Lemmon Survey | EUP | 3.5 km | MPC · JPL |
| 571077 | 2007 BF_{104} | — | September 29, 2010 | Mount Lemmon | Mount Lemmon Survey | · | 3.1 km | MPC · JPL |
| 571078 | 2007 BP_{104} | — | January 27, 2007 | Mount Lemmon | Mount Lemmon Survey | · | 1.0 km | MPC · JPL |
| 571079 | 2007 BV_{104} | — | January 24, 2007 | Mount Lemmon | Mount Lemmon Survey | · | 2.1 km | MPC · JPL |
| 571080 | 2007 BA_{105} | — | January 17, 2007 | Kitt Peak | Spacewatch | · | 2.2 km | MPC · JPL |
| 571081 | 2007 BK_{105} | — | January 17, 2011 | Mount Lemmon | Mount Lemmon Survey | · | 1.3 km | MPC · JPL |
| 571082 | 2007 BN_{105} | — | April 27, 2008 | Kitt Peak | Spacewatch | · | 2.5 km | MPC · JPL |
| 571083 | 2007 BO_{105} | — | January 9, 2007 | Kitt Peak | Spacewatch | · | 510 m | MPC · JPL |
| 571084 | 2007 BP_{105} | — | January 17, 2007 | Kitt Peak | Spacewatch | (5) | 1.0 km | MPC · JPL |
| 571085 | 2007 BH_{106} | — | January 17, 2007 | Palomar | NEAT | H | 400 m | MPC · JPL |
| 571086 | 2007 BP_{106} | — | January 27, 2007 | Kitt Peak | Spacewatch | · | 2.0 km | MPC · JPL |
| 571087 | 2007 BQ_{107} | — | December 4, 2012 | Mount Lemmon | Mount Lemmon Survey | · | 520 m | MPC · JPL |
| 571088 | 2007 BT_{108} | — | January 27, 2007 | Kitt Peak | Spacewatch | · | 480 m | MPC · JPL |
| 571089 | 2007 BL_{109} | — | January 17, 2007 | Kitt Peak | Spacewatch | MAR | 760 m | MPC · JPL |
| 571090 | 2007 BM_{109} | — | January 12, 2018 | Haleakala | Pan-STARRS 1 | · | 2.6 km | MPC · JPL |
| 571091 | 2007 BN_{109} | — | September 25, 2016 | Haleakala | Pan-STARRS 1 | · | 2.9 km | MPC · JPL |
| 571092 | 2007 BT_{109} | — | January 19, 2013 | Kitt Peak | Spacewatch | HYG | 2.3 km | MPC · JPL |
| 571093 | 2007 BJ_{110} | — | March 31, 2008 | Mount Lemmon | Mount Lemmon Survey | · | 2.2 km | MPC · JPL |
| 571094 | 2007 BW_{110} | — | April 5, 2014 | Haleakala | Pan-STARRS 1 | · | 540 m | MPC · JPL |
| 571095 | 2007 BV_{112} | — | August 12, 2015 | Haleakala | Pan-STARRS 1 | · | 520 m | MPC · JPL |
| 571096 | 2007 BF_{114} | — | January 26, 2007 | Kitt Peak | Spacewatch | · | 2.6 km | MPC · JPL |
| 571097 | 2007 BG_{115} | — | January 17, 2007 | Kitt Peak | Spacewatch | · | 1.0 km | MPC · JPL |
| 571098 | 2007 BZ_{115} | — | January 27, 2007 | Mount Lemmon | Mount Lemmon Survey | ARM | 2.8 km | MPC · JPL |
| 571099 | 2007 BD_{116} | — | January 24, 2007 | Catalina | CSS | EOS | 1.7 km | MPC · JPL |
| 571100 | 2007 BT_{116} | — | January 27, 2007 | Kitt Peak | Spacewatch | MAR | 840 m | MPC · JPL |

== 571101–571200 ==
back to top

| Designation | | | Discovery | | | Properties | | Ref |
| Permanent | Provisional | Named after | Date | Site | Discoverer(s) | Category | Diam. | Ref |
|---|---|---|---|---|---|---|---|---|
| 571101 | 2007 BX_{116} | — | January 28, 2007 | Mount Lemmon | Mount Lemmon Survey | EUN | 870 m | MPC · JPL |
| 571102 | 2007 CG_{10} | — | February 6, 2007 | Mount Lemmon | Mount Lemmon Survey | · | 1.3 km | MPC · JPL |
| 571103 | 2007 CE_{14} | — | February 7, 2007 | Kitt Peak | Spacewatch | · | 2.5 km | MPC · JPL |
| 571104 | 2007 CU_{14} | — | February 7, 2007 | Mount Lemmon | Mount Lemmon Survey | · | 610 m | MPC · JPL |
| 571105 | 2007 CV_{15} | — | February 6, 2003 | Kitt Peak | Spacewatch | · | 1.4 km | MPC · JPL |
| 571106 | 2007 CY_{16} | — | February 8, 2007 | Kitt Peak | Spacewatch | · | 490 m | MPC · JPL |
| 571107 | 2007 CD_{17} | — | February 8, 2007 | Kitt Peak | Spacewatch | · | 1.1 km | MPC · JPL |
| 571108 | 2007 CH_{17} | — | February 8, 2007 | Mount Lemmon | Mount Lemmon Survey | · | 1.2 km | MPC · JPL |
| 571109 | 2007 CF_{18} | — | February 8, 2007 | Mount Lemmon | Mount Lemmon Survey | · | 2.0 km | MPC · JPL |
| 571110 | 2007 CY_{26} | — | February 9, 2007 | Marly | P. Kocher | EUN | 1.3 km | MPC · JPL |
| 571111 | 2007 CA_{33} | — | January 27, 2007 | Kitt Peak | Spacewatch | · | 740 m | MPC · JPL |
| 571112 | 2007 CL_{40} | — | December 20, 2006 | Catalina | CSS | · | 3.1 km | MPC · JPL |
| 571113 | 2007 CP_{42} | — | February 7, 2007 | Mount Lemmon | Mount Lemmon Survey | · | 890 m | MPC · JPL |
| 571114 | 2007 CE_{43} | — | February 9, 2007 | Mount Lemmon | Mount Lemmon Survey | · | 1.3 km | MPC · JPL |
| 571115 | 2007 CH_{46} | — | February 10, 2007 | Palomar | NEAT | · | 1.6 km | MPC · JPL |
| 571116 | 2007 CE_{49} | — | February 10, 2007 | Mount Lemmon | Mount Lemmon Survey | HNS | 810 m | MPC · JPL |
| 571117 Mikehudson | 2007 CH_{61} | Mikehudson | December 13, 2006 | Mauna Kea | D. D. Balam, K. M. Perrett | · | 1.5 km | MPC · JPL |
| 571118 | 2007 CZ_{67} | — | February 14, 2007 | Mauna Kea | P. A. Wiegert | · | 940 m | MPC · JPL |
| 571119 | 2007 CK_{69} | — | February 14, 2007 | Mauna Kea | P. A. Wiegert | · | 2.1 km | MPC · JPL |
| 571120 | 2007 CO_{69} | — | January 27, 2007 | Kitt Peak | Spacewatch | · | 630 m | MPC · JPL |
| 571121 | 2007 CK_{73} | — | March 10, 2007 | Mount Lemmon | Mount Lemmon Survey | · | 2.6 km | MPC · JPL |
| 571122 | 2007 CX_{78} | — | February 10, 2007 | Mount Lemmon | Mount Lemmon Survey | (10369) | 1.2 km | MPC · JPL |
| 571123 | 2007 CQ_{80} | — | February 10, 2007 | Mount Lemmon | Mount Lemmon Survey | · | 590 m | MPC · JPL |
| 571124 | 2007 CR_{80} | — | February 10, 2007 | Mount Lemmon | Mount Lemmon Survey | · | 540 m | MPC · JPL |
| 571125 | 2007 CV_{80} | — | February 13, 2007 | Mount Lemmon | Mount Lemmon Survey | · | 2.9 km | MPC · JPL |
| 571126 | 2007 CE_{81} | — | March 10, 2008 | Mount Lemmon | Mount Lemmon Survey | EOS | 1.8 km | MPC · JPL |
| 571127 | 2007 CJ_{81} | — | February 9, 2007 | Catalina | CSS | · | 1.1 km | MPC · JPL |
| 571128 | 2007 CQ_{83} | — | February 10, 2007 | Mount Lemmon | Mount Lemmon Survey | · | 3.3 km | MPC · JPL |
| 571129 | 2007 CO_{84} | — | March 17, 2002 | Kitt Peak | Spacewatch | · | 2.1 km | MPC · JPL |
| 571130 | 2007 CP_{84} | — | February 6, 2007 | Mount Lemmon | Mount Lemmon Survey | EOS | 1.5 km | MPC · JPL |
| 571131 | 2007 CV_{84} | — | February 10, 2007 | Mount Lemmon | Mount Lemmon Survey | · | 1.0 km | MPC · JPL |
| 571132 | 2007 DN_{18} | — | February 17, 2007 | Kitt Peak | Spacewatch | · | 2.5 km | MPC · JPL |
| 571133 | 2007 DU_{19} | — | February 17, 2007 | Kitt Peak | Spacewatch | · | 3.1 km | MPC · JPL |
| 571134 | 2007 DA_{20} | — | February 17, 2007 | Kitt Peak | Spacewatch | · | 2.6 km | MPC · JPL |
| 571135 | 2007 DC_{22} | — | February 17, 2007 | Kitt Peak | Spacewatch | · | 1.5 km | MPC · JPL |
| 571136 | 2007 DW_{22} | — | February 17, 2007 | Kitt Peak | Spacewatch | · | 1.2 km | MPC · JPL |
| 571137 | 2007 DN_{24} | — | February 17, 2007 | Kitt Peak | Spacewatch | · | 1.7 km | MPC · JPL |
| 571138 | 2007 DQ_{32} | — | February 17, 2007 | Kitt Peak | Spacewatch | H | 410 m | MPC · JPL |
| 571139 | 2007 DY_{41} | — | September 10, 2004 | Kitt Peak | Spacewatch | EUN | 1.2 km | MPC · JPL |
| 571140 | 2007 DJ_{48} | — | January 27, 2007 | Mount Lemmon | Mount Lemmon Survey | H | 510 m | MPC · JPL |
| 571141 | 2007 DW_{48} | — | February 21, 2007 | Mount Lemmon | Mount Lemmon Survey | · | 2.8 km | MPC · JPL |
| 571142 | 2007 DL_{59} | — | January 28, 2007 | Mount Lemmon | Mount Lemmon Survey | · | 2.2 km | MPC · JPL |
| 571143 | 2007 DT_{62} | — | February 21, 2007 | Kitt Peak | Spacewatch | · | 2.0 km | MPC · JPL |
| 571144 | 2007 DG_{66} | — | January 10, 2003 | Kitt Peak | Spacewatch | · | 1.0 km | MPC · JPL |
| 571145 | 2007 DB_{70} | — | February 21, 2007 | Kitt Peak | Spacewatch | MAS | 550 m | MPC · JPL |
| 571146 | 2007 DY_{70} | — | September 25, 1998 | Apache Point | SDSS Collaboration | · | 590 m | MPC · JPL |
| 571147 | 2007 DC_{74} | — | February 21, 2007 | Kitt Peak | Spacewatch | · | 480 m | MPC · JPL |
| 571148 | 2007 DX_{80} | — | February 23, 2007 | Mount Lemmon | Mount Lemmon Survey | · | 1.5 km | MPC · JPL |
| 571149 | 2007 DM_{81} | — | February 23, 2007 | Mount Lemmon | Mount Lemmon Survey | (194) | 1.1 km | MPC · JPL |
| 571150 | 2007 DF_{83} | — | February 25, 2007 | Mount Lemmon | Mount Lemmon Survey | · | 1.5 km | MPC · JPL |
| 571151 | 2007 DB_{84} | — | October 1, 2005 | Kitt Peak | Spacewatch | (5) | 1.2 km | MPC · JPL |
| 571152 | 2007 DZ_{90} | — | January 23, 2007 | Bergisch Gladbach | W. Bickel | · | 1.0 km | MPC · JPL |
| 571153 | 2007 DA_{92} | — | February 23, 2007 | Mount Lemmon | Mount Lemmon Survey | · | 1.5 km | MPC · JPL |
| 571154 | 2007 DY_{95} | — | September 18, 2001 | Kitt Peak | Spacewatch | · | 1.1 km | MPC · JPL |
| 571155 | 2007 DD_{97} | — | February 23, 2007 | Mount Lemmon | Mount Lemmon Survey | · | 700 m | MPC · JPL |
| 571156 | 2007 DX_{102} | — | February 17, 2007 | Kitt Peak | Spacewatch | EUN | 920 m | MPC · JPL |
| 571157 | 2007 DJ_{116} | — | February 16, 2007 | Catalina | CSS | · | 1.7 km | MPC · JPL |
| 571158 | 2007 DO_{116} | — | February 16, 2007 | Catalina | CSS | · | 1.3 km | MPC · JPL |
| 571159 | 2007 DX_{118} | — | September 23, 2005 | Kitt Peak | Spacewatch | · | 590 m | MPC · JPL |
| 571160 | 2007 DD_{120} | — | February 25, 2007 | Mount Lemmon | Mount Lemmon Survey | · | 2.5 km | MPC · JPL |
| 571161 | 2007 DS_{120} | — | February 25, 2007 | Mount Lemmon | Mount Lemmon Survey | · | 2.8 km | MPC · JPL |
| 571162 | 2007 DL_{121} | — | January 28, 2011 | Mount Lemmon | Mount Lemmon Survey | · | 1.5 km | MPC · JPL |
| 571163 | 2007 DV_{121} | — | February 25, 2007 | Kitt Peak | Spacewatch | · | 1.4 km | MPC · JPL |
| 571164 | 2007 DT_{122} | — | March 29, 2008 | Kitt Peak | Spacewatch | · | 1.4 km | MPC · JPL |
| 571165 | 2007 DW_{122} | — | February 22, 2007 | Mount Lemmon | Mount Lemmon Survey | · | 3.3 km | MPC · JPL |
| 571166 | 2007 DY_{122} | — | February 9, 2007 | Kitt Peak | Spacewatch | · | 1.3 km | MPC · JPL |
| 571167 | 2007 DR_{123} | — | November 19, 2009 | Mount Lemmon | Mount Lemmon Survey | · | 640 m | MPC · JPL |
| 571168 | 2007 DL_{124} | — | December 29, 2011 | Mount Lemmon | Mount Lemmon Survey | · | 2.7 km | MPC · JPL |
| 571169 | 2007 DD_{125} | — | February 17, 2007 | Kitt Peak | Spacewatch | · | 2.3 km | MPC · JPL |
| 571170 | 2007 DP_{125} | — | September 19, 1998 | Apache Point | SDSS Collaboration | · | 2.1 km | MPC · JPL |
| 571171 | 2007 DT_{125} | — | March 20, 2017 | Haleakala | Pan-STARRS 1 | · | 460 m | MPC · JPL |
| 571172 | 2007 DX_{125} | — | February 14, 2013 | Haleakala | Pan-STARRS 1 | · | 2.8 km | MPC · JPL |
| 571173 | 2007 DF_{126} | — | October 22, 2012 | Haleakala | Pan-STARRS 1 | · | 450 m | MPC · JPL |
| 571174 | 2007 DM_{126} | — | February 21, 2007 | Mount Lemmon | Mount Lemmon Survey | · | 1.3 km | MPC · JPL |
| 571175 | 2007 DU_{127} | — | February 25, 2007 | Mount Lemmon | Mount Lemmon Survey | · | 1 km | MPC · JPL |
| 571176 | 2007 DW_{127} | — | February 16, 2007 | Mount Lemmon | Mount Lemmon Survey | · | 1.5 km | MPC · JPL |
| 571177 | 2007 DF_{128} | — | February 21, 2007 | Kitt Peak | Spacewatch | L5 | 6.7 km | MPC · JPL |
| 571178 | 2007 DO_{129} | — | February 23, 2007 | Mount Lemmon | Mount Lemmon Survey | · | 1.1 km | MPC · JPL |
| 571179 | 2007 EU_{2} | — | April 21, 2002 | Palomar | NEAT | H | 700 m | MPC · JPL |
| 571180 | 2007 EJ_{3} | — | April 5, 2003 | Kitt Peak | Spacewatch | (5) | 1.4 km | MPC · JPL |
| 571181 | 2007 EO_{3} | — | September 29, 2005 | Catalina | CSS | · | 1.9 km | MPC · JPL |
| 571182 | 2007 EX_{3} | — | August 31, 2005 | Kitt Peak | Spacewatch | · | 730 m | MPC · JPL |
| 571183 | 2007 EJ_{15} | — | March 9, 2007 | Mount Lemmon | Mount Lemmon Survey | WIT | 720 m | MPC · JPL |
| 571184 | 2007 EY_{17} | — | April 27, 2003 | Apache Point | SDSS Collaboration | HNS | 1 km | MPC · JPL |
| 571185 | 2007 EE_{19} | — | February 21, 2007 | Mount Lemmon | Mount Lemmon Survey | · | 2.8 km | MPC · JPL |
| 571186 | 2007 EM_{23} | — | March 10, 2007 | Mount Lemmon | Mount Lemmon Survey | LUT | 3.1 km | MPC · JPL |
| 571187 | 2007 EX_{23} | — | March 10, 2007 | Mount Lemmon | Mount Lemmon Survey | · | 1.4 km | MPC · JPL |
| 571188 | 2007 EF_{27} | — | March 12, 2007 | Altschwendt | W. Ries | · | 2.5 km | MPC · JPL |
| 571189 | 2007 EG_{29} | — | March 9, 2007 | Kitt Peak | Spacewatch | · | 640 m | MPC · JPL |
| 571190 | 2007 EJ_{29} | — | March 9, 2007 | Kitt Peak | Spacewatch | · | 2.6 km | MPC · JPL |
| 571191 | 2007 ES_{33} | — | March 10, 2007 | Mount Lemmon | Mount Lemmon Survey | · | 3.4 km | MPC · JPL |
| 571192 | 2007 ED_{42} | — | August 13, 2004 | Cerro Tololo | Deep Ecliptic Survey | EUN | 1.1 km | MPC · JPL |
| 571193 | 2007 EQ_{44} | — | February 7, 2007 | Mount Lemmon | Mount Lemmon Survey | · | 3.6 km | MPC · JPL |
| 571194 | 2007 EC_{50} | — | February 23, 2007 | Mount Lemmon | Mount Lemmon Survey | · | 550 m | MPC · JPL |
| 571195 | 2007 EW_{60} | — | March 10, 2007 | Kitt Peak | Spacewatch | · | 640 m | MPC · JPL |
| 571196 | 2007 EU_{63} | — | February 25, 2007 | Kitt Peak | Spacewatch | MAS | 700 m | MPC · JPL |
| 571197 | 2007 ED_{65} | — | March 10, 2007 | Kitt Peak | Spacewatch | · | 1.4 km | MPC · JPL |
| 571198 | 2007 EN_{65} | — | March 10, 2007 | Kitt Peak | Spacewatch | · | 1.5 km | MPC · JPL |
| 571199 | 2007 EX_{71} | — | March 10, 2007 | Mount Lemmon | Mount Lemmon Survey | · | 1.3 km | MPC · JPL |
| 571200 | 2007 EY_{72} | — | February 27, 2007 | Kitt Peak | Spacewatch | · | 270 m | MPC · JPL |

== 571201–571300 ==
back to top

| Designation | | | Discovery | | | Properties | | Ref |
| Permanent | Provisional | Named after | Date | Site | Discoverer(s) | Category | Diam. | Ref |
|---|---|---|---|---|---|---|---|---|
| 571201 | 2007 EQ_{74} | — | March 10, 2007 | Kitt Peak | Spacewatch | · | 650 m | MPC · JPL |
| 571202 | 2007 ER_{77} | — | March 10, 2007 | Mount Lemmon | Mount Lemmon Survey | · | 630 m | MPC · JPL |
| 571203 | 2007 EQ_{83} | — | March 12, 2007 | Kitt Peak | Spacewatch | · | 1.3 km | MPC · JPL |
| 571204 | 2007 ER_{83} | — | March 12, 2007 | Kitt Peak | Spacewatch | · | 1.8 km | MPC · JPL |
| 571205 | 2007 EO_{84} | — | March 12, 2007 | Mount Lemmon | Mount Lemmon Survey | · | 630 m | MPC · JPL |
| 571206 | 2007 EF_{85} | — | March 12, 2007 | Kitt Peak | Spacewatch | · | 1.8 km | MPC · JPL |
| 571207 | 2007 EM_{87} | — | March 13, 2007 | Kitt Peak | Spacewatch | · | 3.1 km | MPC · JPL |
| 571208 | 2007 ER_{93} | — | August 14, 2004 | Cerro Tololo | Deep Ecliptic Survey | · | 2.4 km | MPC · JPL |
| 571209 | 2007 EV_{93} | — | March 10, 2007 | Mount Lemmon | Mount Lemmon Survey | HNS | 1.2 km | MPC · JPL |
| 571210 | 2007 EA_{98} | — | February 23, 2007 | Mount Lemmon | Mount Lemmon Survey | · | 3.3 km | MPC · JPL |
| 571211 | 2007 EM_{104} | — | March 11, 2007 | Mount Lemmon | Mount Lemmon Survey | L5 | 8.0 km | MPC · JPL |
| 571212 | 2007 EZ_{110} | — | March 11, 2007 | Kitt Peak | Spacewatch | · | 1.3 km | MPC · JPL |
| 571213 | 2007 EA_{116} | — | March 13, 2007 | Mount Lemmon | Mount Lemmon Survey | · | 610 m | MPC · JPL |
| 571214 | 2007 EY_{121} | — | March 14, 2007 | Mount Lemmon | Mount Lemmon Survey | · | 2.5 km | MPC · JPL |
| 571215 | 2007 EF_{122} | — | September 24, 2005 | Kitt Peak | Spacewatch | MAR | 880 m | MPC · JPL |
| 571216 | 2007 EW_{123} | — | March 14, 2007 | Mount Lemmon | Mount Lemmon Survey | · | 620 m | MPC · JPL |
| 571217 | 2007 EN_{125} | — | March 14, 2007 | Mount Lemmon | Mount Lemmon Survey | · | 1.5 km | MPC · JPL |
| 571218 | 2007 EC_{129} | — | March 9, 2007 | Mount Lemmon | Mount Lemmon Survey | · | 1.4 km | MPC · JPL |
| 571219 | 2007 EM_{134} | — | March 10, 2007 | Kitt Peak | Spacewatch | · | 820 m | MPC · JPL |
| 571220 | 2007 ER_{137} | — | March 11, 2007 | Mount Lemmon | Mount Lemmon Survey | · | 760 m | MPC · JPL |
| 571221 | 2007 EC_{138} | — | January 28, 2007 | Mount Lemmon | Mount Lemmon Survey | · | 2.5 km | MPC · JPL |
| 571222 | 2007 EQ_{138} | — | February 9, 2007 | Kitt Peak | Spacewatch | · | 580 m | MPC · JPL |
| 571223 | 2007 EN_{144} | — | March 12, 2007 | Mount Lemmon | Mount Lemmon Survey | · | 2.8 km | MPC · JPL |
| 571224 | 2007 EX_{153} | — | March 12, 2007 | Kitt Peak | Spacewatch | · | 600 m | MPC · JPL |
| 571225 | 2007 ES_{157} | — | March 13, 2007 | Mount Lemmon | Mount Lemmon Survey | · | 1.2 km | MPC · JPL |
| 571226 | 2007 EJ_{163} | — | March 15, 2007 | Kitt Peak | Spacewatch | · | 520 m | MPC · JPL |
| 571227 | 2007 EW_{165} | — | March 16, 2007 | Catalina | CSS | JUN | 1.1 km | MPC · JPL |
| 571228 | 2007 EV_{167} | — | January 30, 2006 | Kitt Peak | Spacewatch | L5 | 7.3 km | MPC · JPL |
| 571229 | 2007 EU_{168} | — | March 13, 2007 | Kitt Peak | Spacewatch | · | 3.2 km | MPC · JPL |
| 571230 | 2007 EH_{172} | — | September 14, 2005 | Kitt Peak | Spacewatch | · | 690 m | MPC · JPL |
| 571231 | 2007 EO_{172} | — | March 14, 2007 | Kitt Peak | Spacewatch | · | 1.2 km | MPC · JPL |
| 571232 | 2007 EN_{173} | — | March 10, 2007 | Kitt Peak | Spacewatch | · | 1.4 km | MPC · JPL |
| 571233 | 2007 ET_{176} | — | March 14, 2007 | Kitt Peak | Spacewatch | · | 2.5 km | MPC · JPL |
| 571234 | 2007 EF_{178} | — | September 15, 1998 | Kitt Peak | Spacewatch | · | 770 m | MPC · JPL |
| 571235 | 2007 EL_{179} | — | March 14, 2007 | Kitt Peak | Spacewatch | · | 1.5 km | MPC · JPL |
| 571236 | 2007 EZ_{183} | — | February 23, 2007 | Kitt Peak | Spacewatch | · | 530 m | MPC · JPL |
| 571237 | 2007 EC_{186} | — | March 15, 2007 | Mount Lemmon | Mount Lemmon Survey | · | 1.3 km | MPC · JPL |
| 571238 | 2007 ED_{187} | — | March 15, 2007 | Mount Lemmon | Mount Lemmon Survey | · | 2.6 km | MPC · JPL |
| 571239 | 2007 EQ_{191} | — | March 13, 2007 | Kitt Peak | Spacewatch | · | 1.6 km | MPC · JPL |
| 571240 | 2007 EQ_{202} | — | March 9, 2007 | Kitt Peak | Spacewatch | · | 750 m | MPC · JPL |
| 571241 | 2007 EQ_{204} | — | March 11, 2007 | Kitt Peak | Spacewatch | EOS | 1.7 km | MPC · JPL |
| 571242 | 2007 EG_{207} | — | March 14, 2007 | Kitt Peak | Spacewatch | · | 630 m | MPC · JPL |
| 571243 | 2007 EK_{216} | — | January 7, 2000 | Kitt Peak | Spacewatch | · | 800 m | MPC · JPL |
| 571244 | 2007 EW_{217} | — | March 14, 2007 | Mount Lemmon | Mount Lemmon Survey | T_{j} (2.93) | 2.8 km | MPC · JPL |
| 571245 | 2007 EE_{226} | — | March 11, 2007 | Mount Lemmon | Mount Lemmon Survey | · | 1.3 km | MPC · JPL |
| 571246 | 2007 ES_{226} | — | March 9, 2007 | Mount Lemmon | Mount Lemmon Survey | · | 520 m | MPC · JPL |
| 571247 | 2007 EX_{226} | — | October 18, 1995 | Kitt Peak | Spacewatch | · | 500 m | MPC · JPL |
| 571248 | 2007 EJ_{227} | — | March 15, 2007 | Mount Lemmon | Mount Lemmon Survey | · | 1.3 km | MPC · JPL |
| 571249 | 2007 EP_{227} | — | March 13, 2007 | Kitt Peak | Spacewatch | L5 | 8.2 km | MPC · JPL |
| 571250 | 2007 EL_{228} | — | March 15, 2007 | Mount Lemmon | Mount Lemmon Survey | TIR | 2.5 km | MPC · JPL |
| 571251 | 2007 ER_{228} | — | August 18, 2009 | Kitt Peak | Spacewatch | · | 2.8 km | MPC · JPL |
| 571252 | 2007 EX_{228} | — | August 25, 2014 | Haleakala | Pan-STARRS 1 | · | 1.7 km | MPC · JPL |
| 571253 | 2007 EK_{229} | — | September 2, 2013 | Mount Lemmon | Mount Lemmon Survey | HNS | 750 m | MPC · JPL |
| 571254 | 2007 EQ_{229} | — | September 11, 2010 | Mount Lemmon | Mount Lemmon Survey | · | 2.7 km | MPC · JPL |
| 571255 | 2007 ER_{229} | — | March 14, 2007 | Kitt Peak | Spacewatch | · | 1.3 km | MPC · JPL |
| 571256 | 2007 EQ_{230} | — | March 16, 2016 | Haleakala | Pan-STARRS 1 | · | 1.5 km | MPC · JPL |
| 571257 | 2007 EB_{231} | — | October 23, 2012 | Kitt Peak | Spacewatch | V | 510 m | MPC · JPL |
| 571258 | 2007 EE_{231} | — | October 17, 2010 | Mount Lemmon | Mount Lemmon Survey | · | 2.5 km | MPC · JPL |
| 571259 | 2007 EJ_{231} | — | September 9, 2013 | Haleakala | Pan-STARRS 1 | · | 1.2 km | MPC · JPL |
| 571260 | 2007 EP_{231} | — | March 8, 2013 | Haleakala | Pan-STARRS 1 | HYG | 2.5 km | MPC · JPL |
| 571261 | 2007 EU_{231} | — | March 14, 2007 | Mount Lemmon | Mount Lemmon Survey | · | 2.1 km | MPC · JPL |
| 571262 | 2007 EL_{232} | — | January 13, 2011 | Kitt Peak | Spacewatch | · | 1.4 km | MPC · JPL |
| 571263 | 2007 EE_{233} | — | March 11, 2007 | Mount Lemmon | Mount Lemmon Survey | (5) | 1.0 km | MPC · JPL |
| 571264 | 2007 EA_{236} | — | May 29, 2008 | Mount Lemmon | Mount Lemmon Survey | · | 2.5 km | MPC · JPL |
| 571265 | 2007 EQ_{236} | — | March 4, 2016 | Haleakala | Pan-STARRS 1 | EUN | 850 m | MPC · JPL |
| 571266 | 2007 EB_{239} | — | March 14, 2007 | Mount Lemmon | Mount Lemmon Survey | · | 1.5 km | MPC · JPL |
| 571267 | 2007 ER_{239} | — | March 14, 2007 | Mount Lemmon | Mount Lemmon Survey | · | 1.1 km | MPC · JPL |
| 571268 | 2007 EY_{239} | — | March 9, 2007 | Mount Lemmon | Mount Lemmon Survey | · | 2.1 km | MPC · JPL |
| 571269 | 2007 EH_{241} | — | March 13, 2007 | Kitt Peak | Spacewatch | L5 | 7.5 km | MPC · JPL |
| 571270 | 2007 ER_{241} | — | March 13, 2007 | Mount Lemmon | Mount Lemmon Survey | · | 1.5 km | MPC · JPL |
| 571271 | 2007 FZ_{2} | — | March 17, 2007 | Anderson Mesa | LONEOS | · | 1.6 km | MPC · JPL |
| 571272 | 2007 FZ_{4} | — | March 16, 2007 | Kitt Peak | Spacewatch | · | 2.6 km | MPC · JPL |
| 571273 | 2007 FB_{5} | — | March 16, 2007 | Kitt Peak | Spacewatch | · | 1.3 km | MPC · JPL |
| 571274 | 2007 FR_{6} | — | March 16, 2007 | Mount Lemmon | Mount Lemmon Survey | EUN | 940 m | MPC · JPL |
| 571275 | 2007 FT_{6} | — | March 16, 2007 | Mount Lemmon | Mount Lemmon Survey | L5 | 7.6 km | MPC · JPL |
| 571276 | 2007 FJ_{7} | — | March 9, 2007 | Kitt Peak | Spacewatch | · | 2.5 km | MPC · JPL |
| 571277 | 2007 FM_{8} | — | March 16, 2007 | Kitt Peak | Spacewatch | · | 1.5 km | MPC · JPL |
| 571278 | 2007 FB_{17} | — | March 20, 2007 | Mount Lemmon | Mount Lemmon Survey | · | 2.1 km | MPC · JPL |
| 571279 | 2007 FU_{18} | — | September 11, 2004 | Kitt Peak | Spacewatch | · | 3.0 km | MPC · JPL |
| 571280 | 2007 FU_{19} | — | March 20, 2007 | Mount Lemmon | Mount Lemmon Survey | · | 2.2 km | MPC · JPL |
| 571281 | 2007 FL_{41} | — | March 25, 2007 | Mount Lemmon | Mount Lemmon Survey | · | 2.1 km | MPC · JPL |
| 571282 | 2007 FT_{41} | — | March 26, 2007 | Mount Lemmon | Mount Lemmon Survey | · | 1.1 km | MPC · JPL |
| 571283 | 2007 FU_{42} | — | March 30, 2007 | Siding Spring | SSS | PHO | 1.3 km | MPC · JPL |
| 571284 | 2007 FJ_{52} | — | March 26, 2007 | Kitt Peak | Spacewatch | · | 600 m | MPC · JPL |
| 571285 | 2007 FK_{52} | — | March 16, 2007 | Mount Lemmon | Mount Lemmon Survey | · | 910 m | MPC · JPL |
| 571286 | 2007 FU_{52} | — | March 23, 2007 | Siding Spring | SSS | · | 2.0 km | MPC · JPL |
| 571287 | 2007 FP_{53} | — | March 26, 2007 | Kitt Peak | Spacewatch | · | 1.4 km | MPC · JPL |
| 571288 | 2007 FS_{53} | — | September 4, 2008 | Kitt Peak | Spacewatch | · | 700 m | MPC · JPL |
| 571289 | 2007 FX_{53} | — | September 18, 2010 | Kitt Peak | Spacewatch | · | 2.7 km | MPC · JPL |
| 571290 | 2007 FA_{54} | — | August 28, 2015 | Haleakala | Pan-STARRS 1 | · | 3.2 km | MPC · JPL |
| 571291 | 2007 FU_{54} | — | March 16, 2007 | Mount Lemmon | Mount Lemmon Survey | · | 1.2 km | MPC · JPL |
| 571292 | 2007 FD_{55} | — | September 12, 2015 | Haleakala | Pan-STARRS 1 | · | 570 m | MPC · JPL |
| 571293 | 2007 FV_{55} | — | April 10, 2014 | Haleakala | Pan-STARRS 1 | · | 730 m | MPC · JPL |
| 571294 | 2007 FF_{56} | — | September 3, 2008 | Kitt Peak | Spacewatch | · | 690 m | MPC · JPL |
| 571295 | 2007 FQ_{56} | — | March 15, 2007 | Catalina | CSS | · | 1.5 km | MPC · JPL |
| 571296 | 2007 FY_{58} | — | March 16, 2007 | Mount Lemmon | Mount Lemmon Survey | · | 530 m | MPC · JPL |
| 571297 | 2007 FA_{59} | — | December 3, 2015 | Mount Lemmon | Mount Lemmon Survey | L5 | 6.7 km | MPC · JPL |
| 571298 | 2007 FO_{59} | — | March 17, 2007 | Kitt Peak | Spacewatch | · | 1.4 km | MPC · JPL |
| 571299 | 2007 FB_{60} | — | March 16, 2007 | Mount Lemmon | Mount Lemmon Survey | · | 1.1 km | MPC · JPL |
| 571300 | 2007 FG_{60} | — | March 25, 2007 | Mount Lemmon | Mount Lemmon Survey | · | 1.3 km | MPC · JPL |

== 571301–571400 ==
back to top

| Designation | | | Discovery | | | Properties | | Ref |
| Permanent | Provisional | Named after | Date | Site | Discoverer(s) | Category | Diam. | Ref |
|---|---|---|---|---|---|---|---|---|
| 571301 | 2007 GB_{6} | — | April 12, 2007 | Altschwendt | W. Ries | · | 3.5 km | MPC · JPL |
| 571302 | 2007 GN_{7} | — | March 16, 2007 | Kitt Peak | Spacewatch | · | 2.9 km | MPC · JPL |
| 571303 | 2007 GH_{9} | — | December 2, 2005 | Kitt Peak | Spacewatch | · | 1.5 km | MPC · JPL |
| 571304 | 2007 GX_{13} | — | March 14, 2007 | Kitt Peak | Spacewatch | · | 590 m | MPC · JPL |
| 571305 | 2007 GZ_{18} | — | April 11, 2007 | Kitt Peak | Spacewatch | · | 1.6 km | MPC · JPL |
| 571306 | 2007 GH_{26} | — | April 14, 2007 | Mount Lemmon | Mount Lemmon Survey | · | 970 m | MPC · JPL |
| 571307 | 2007 GT_{37} | — | April 14, 2007 | Kitt Peak | Spacewatch | · | 960 m | MPC · JPL |
| 571308 | 2007 GD_{39} | — | April 14, 2007 | Kitt Peak | Spacewatch | · | 3.5 km | MPC · JPL |
| 571309 | 2007 GJ_{60} | — | October 13, 2004 | Kitt Peak | Spacewatch | · | 1.5 km | MPC · JPL |
| 571310 | 2007 GN_{62} | — | April 15, 2007 | Kitt Peak | Spacewatch | · | 690 m | MPC · JPL |
| 571311 | 2007 GX_{63} | — | October 2, 2000 | Kitt Peak | Spacewatch | · | 1.5 km | MPC · JPL |
| 571312 | 2007 GS_{75} | — | April 15, 2007 | Kitt Peak | Spacewatch | · | 520 m | MPC · JPL |
| 571313 | 2007 GD_{77} | — | April 12, 2007 | Lulin | LUSS | · | 2.2 km | MPC · JPL |
| 571314 | 2007 GK_{79} | — | April 29, 2014 | Haleakala | Pan-STARRS 1 | · | 590 m | MPC · JPL |
| 571315 | 2007 GM_{79} | — | September 14, 2013 | Haleakala | Pan-STARRS 1 | · | 1.2 km | MPC · JPL |
| 571316 | 2007 GO_{79} | — | November 28, 2011 | Haleakala | Pan-STARRS 1 | · | 2.5 km | MPC · JPL |
| 571317 | 2007 GH_{80} | — | April 14, 2016 | Mount Lemmon | Mount Lemmon Survey | · | 1.5 km | MPC · JPL |
| 571318 | 2007 GK_{80} | — | November 14, 2010 | Mount Lemmon | Mount Lemmon Survey | · | 3.0 km | MPC · JPL |
| 571319 | 2007 GB_{81} | — | April 15, 2007 | Kitt Peak | Spacewatch | · | 1.3 km | MPC · JPL |
| 571320 | 2007 GF_{81} | — | April 15, 2007 | Kitt Peak | Spacewatch | EUN | 940 m | MPC · JPL |
| 571321 | 2007 HN | — | March 31, 2007 | Palomar | NEAT | · | 2.0 km | MPC · JPL |
| 571322 | 2007 HV_{8} | — | April 18, 2007 | Mount Lemmon | Mount Lemmon Survey | · | 570 m | MPC · JPL |
| 571323 | 2007 HY_{8} | — | April 18, 2007 | Kitt Peak | Spacewatch | · | 580 m | MPC · JPL |
| 571324 | 2007 HR_{9} | — | April 18, 2007 | Mount Lemmon | Mount Lemmon Survey | · | 1.3 km | MPC · JPL |
| 571325 | 2007 HK_{12} | — | March 26, 2007 | Kitt Peak | Spacewatch | · | 1.0 km | MPC · JPL |
| 571326 | 2007 HZ_{13} | — | March 11, 2007 | Mount Lemmon | Mount Lemmon Survey | · | 1.6 km | MPC · JPL |
| 571327 | 2007 HS_{14} | — | March 20, 2007 | Kitt Peak | Spacewatch | · | 1 km | MPC · JPL |
| 571328 | 2007 HH_{36} | — | April 19, 2007 | Kitt Peak | Spacewatch | · | 1.2 km | MPC · JPL |
| 571329 | 2007 HL_{36} | — | April 19, 2007 | Kitt Peak | Spacewatch | · | 580 m | MPC · JPL |
| 571330 | 2007 HH_{37} | — | March 14, 2007 | Mount Lemmon | Mount Lemmon Survey | · | 1.8 km | MPC · JPL |
| 571331 | 2007 HB_{41} | — | March 31, 2007 | Palomar | NEAT | · | 940 m | MPC · JPL |
| 571332 | 2007 HQ_{43} | — | March 15, 2007 | Mount Lemmon | Mount Lemmon Survey | · | 610 m | MPC · JPL |
| 571333 | 2007 HQ_{44} | — | April 18, 2007 | Mount Lemmon | Mount Lemmon Survey | · | 1.5 km | MPC · JPL |
| 571334 | 2007 HG_{54} | — | March 14, 2007 | Mount Lemmon | Mount Lemmon Survey | · | 1.4 km | MPC · JPL |
| 571335 | 2007 HH_{54} | — | April 22, 2007 | Kitt Peak | Spacewatch | · | 1.6 km | MPC · JPL |
| 571336 | 2007 HX_{56} | — | April 22, 2007 | Kitt Peak | Spacewatch | · | 790 m | MPC · JPL |
| 571337 | 2007 HC_{59} | — | March 26, 2007 | Mount Lemmon | Mount Lemmon Survey | · | 1.5 km | MPC · JPL |
| 571338 | 2007 HA_{63} | — | April 22, 2007 | Mount Lemmon | Mount Lemmon Survey | · | 2.6 km | MPC · JPL |
| 571339 | 2007 HQ_{73} | — | April 11, 2007 | Mount Lemmon | Mount Lemmon Survey | ADE | 1.7 km | MPC · JPL |
| 571340 | 2007 HR_{77} | — | March 14, 2007 | Mount Lemmon | Mount Lemmon Survey | · | 1.1 km | MPC · JPL |
| 571341 | 2007 HJ_{78} | — | April 23, 2007 | Mount Lemmon | Mount Lemmon Survey | · | 1.4 km | MPC · JPL |
| 571342 | 2007 HC_{81} | — | October 9, 2004 | Kitt Peak | Spacewatch | · | 1.7 km | MPC · JPL |
| 571343 | 2007 HJ_{83} | — | April 23, 2007 | Kitt Peak | Spacewatch | · | 1.4 km | MPC · JPL |
| 571344 | 2007 HR_{84} | — | April 22, 2007 | Kitt Peak | Spacewatch | · | 2.7 km | MPC · JPL |
| 571345 | 2007 HH_{86} | — | March 14, 2007 | Mount Lemmon | Mount Lemmon Survey | JUN | 900 m | MPC · JPL |
| 571346 | 2007 HN_{88} | — | March 12, 2007 | Catalina | CSS | · | 1.2 km | MPC · JPL |
| 571347 | 2007 HX_{90} | — | April 16, 2007 | Mount Lemmon | Mount Lemmon Survey | · | 1.5 km | MPC · JPL |
| 571348 | 2007 HD_{91} | — | March 13, 2007 | Mount Lemmon | Mount Lemmon Survey | · | 1.8 km | MPC · JPL |
| 571349 | 2007 HQ_{92} | — | April 21, 2007 | Cerro Tololo | Wasserman, L. H. | · | 710 m | MPC · JPL |
| 571350 | 2007 HS_{99} | — | April 22, 2007 | Mount Lemmon | Mount Lemmon Survey | AEO | 1.0 km | MPC · JPL |
| 571351 | 2007 HT_{100} | — | April 25, 2007 | Kitt Peak | Spacewatch | V | 490 m | MPC · JPL |
| 571352 | 2007 HV_{100} | — | April 22, 2007 | Kitt Peak | Spacewatch | · | 1.5 km | MPC · JPL |
| 571353 | 2007 HY_{101} | — | April 24, 2007 | Kitt Peak | Spacewatch | · | 1.5 km | MPC · JPL |
| 571354 | 2007 HC_{102} | — | September 18, 2010 | Mount Lemmon | Mount Lemmon Survey | · | 3.1 km | MPC · JPL |
| 571355 | 2007 HT_{102} | — | November 2, 2013 | Mount Lemmon | Mount Lemmon Survey | · | 1.6 km | MPC · JPL |
| 571356 | 2007 HW_{102} | — | April 18, 2007 | Kitt Peak | Spacewatch | · | 660 m | MPC · JPL |
| 571357 | 2007 HU_{104} | — | November 16, 2009 | Kitt Peak | Spacewatch | · | 1.7 km | MPC · JPL |
| 571358 | 2007 HN_{111} | — | April 20, 2007 | Mount Lemmon | Mount Lemmon Survey | · | 1.7 km | MPC · JPL |
| 571359 | 2007 HO_{111} | — | April 22, 2007 | Kitt Peak | Spacewatch | · | 1.3 km | MPC · JPL |
| 571360 | 2007 HD_{112} | — | April 18, 2007 | Kitt Peak | Spacewatch | · | 890 m | MPC · JPL |
| 571361 | 2007 HD_{113} | — | April 22, 2007 | Mount Lemmon | Mount Lemmon Survey | · | 590 m | MPC · JPL |
| 571362 | 2007 JS_{10} | — | May 7, 2007 | Kitt Peak | Spacewatch | · | 2.0 km | MPC · JPL |
| 571363 | 2007 JC_{20} | — | April 25, 2007 | Kitt Peak | Spacewatch | · | 670 m | MPC · JPL |
| 571364 | 2007 JL_{20} | — | April 11, 2007 | Mount Lemmon | Mount Lemmon Survey | HNS | 1 km | MPC · JPL |
| 571365 | 2007 JF_{27} | — | May 9, 2007 | Kitt Peak | Spacewatch | · | 750 m | MPC · JPL |
| 571366 | 2007 JE_{31} | — | April 24, 2007 | Kitt Peak | Spacewatch | · | 570 m | MPC · JPL |
| 571367 | 2007 JO_{31} | — | May 12, 2007 | Mount Lemmon | Mount Lemmon Survey | EUN | 1.1 km | MPC · JPL |
| 571368 | 2007 JC_{32} | — | March 13, 2007 | Mount Lemmon | Mount Lemmon Survey | · | 620 m | MPC · JPL |
| 571369 | 2007 JD_{37} | — | May 10, 2007 | Kitt Peak | Spacewatch | EOS | 1.9 km | MPC · JPL |
| 571370 | 2007 JX_{37} | — | April 18, 2007 | Mount Lemmon | Mount Lemmon Survey | · | 500 m | MPC · JPL |
| 571371 | 2007 JJ_{38} | — | January 7, 2006 | Mount Lemmon | Mount Lemmon Survey | (5) | 970 m | MPC · JPL |
| 571372 | 2007 JM_{41} | — | April 28, 2007 | Kitt Peak | Spacewatch | · | 670 m | MPC · JPL |
| 571373 | 2007 JW_{42} | — | May 14, 2007 | Siding Spring | SSS | · | 2.4 km | MPC · JPL |
| 571374 | 2007 JX_{46} | — | May 10, 2007 | Mount Lemmon | Mount Lemmon Survey | · | 2.5 km | MPC · JPL |
| 571375 | 2007 JH_{47} | — | September 7, 2008 | Mount Lemmon | Mount Lemmon Survey | · | 1.5 km | MPC · JPL |
| 571376 | 2007 JK_{47} | — | March 2, 2011 | Kitt Peak | Spacewatch | · | 1.6 km | MPC · JPL |
| 571377 | 2007 JB_{48} | — | March 4, 2016 | Haleakala | Pan-STARRS 1 | EUN | 970 m | MPC · JPL |
| 571378 | 2007 JP_{48} | — | February 26, 2011 | Catalina | CSS | · | 1.6 km | MPC · JPL |
| 571379 | 2007 JE_{49} | — | September 8, 2011 | Kitt Peak | Spacewatch | · | 560 m | MPC · JPL |
| 571380 | 2007 JP_{49} | — | September 6, 2013 | Mount Lemmon | Mount Lemmon Survey | · | 1.5 km | MPC · JPL |
| 571381 | 2007 JB_{51} | — | January 23, 2015 | Haleakala | Pan-STARRS 1 | · | 1.2 km | MPC · JPL |
| 571382 | 2007 JP_{51} | — | May 12, 2007 | Kitt Peak | Spacewatch | HNS | 1.0 km | MPC · JPL |
| 571383 | 2007 KY | — | May 16, 2007 | Mount Lemmon | Mount Lemmon Survey | · | 2.2 km | MPC · JPL |
| 571384 | 2007 KC_{1} | — | May 16, 2007 | Mount Lemmon | Mount Lemmon Survey | · | 1.6 km | MPC · JPL |
| 571385 | 2007 KC_{2} | — | May 18, 2007 | Mount Lemmon | Mount Lemmon Survey | · | 420 m | MPC · JPL |
| 571386 | 2007 KZ_{2} | — | December 24, 2005 | Kitt Peak | Spacewatch | WIT | 990 m | MPC · JPL |
| 571387 | 2007 KA_{6} | — | May 11, 2007 | Mount Lemmon | Mount Lemmon Survey | · | 560 m | MPC · JPL |
| 571388 | 2007 KE_{10} | — | May 26, 2007 | Mount Lemmon | Mount Lemmon Survey | · | 1.4 km | MPC · JPL |
| 571389 | 2007 KP_{10} | — | September 4, 2008 | Kitt Peak | Spacewatch | · | 1.5 km | MPC · JPL |
| 571390 | 2007 KV_{11} | — | May 25, 2007 | Mount Lemmon | Mount Lemmon Survey | · | 500 m | MPC · JPL |
| 571391 | 2007 KW_{11} | — | May 16, 2007 | Kitt Peak | Spacewatch | · | 1.4 km | MPC · JPL |
| 571392 | 2007 LQ_{3} | — | June 8, 2007 | Kitt Peak | Spacewatch | · | 1.5 km | MPC · JPL |
| 571393 | 2007 LD_{7} | — | June 8, 2007 | Kitt Peak | Spacewatch | · | 2.1 km | MPC · JPL |
| 571394 | 2007 LL_{10} | — | May 12, 2007 | Mount Lemmon | Mount Lemmon Survey | · | 1.5 km | MPC · JPL |
| 571395 | 2007 LU_{12} | — | May 12, 2007 | Mount Lemmon | Mount Lemmon Survey | · | 1.4 km | MPC · JPL |
| 571396 | 2007 LM_{20} | — | June 10, 2007 | Kitt Peak | Spacewatch | · | 1.8 km | MPC · JPL |
| 571397 | 2007 LZ_{22} | — | June 13, 2007 | Kitt Peak | Spacewatch | · | 1.9 km | MPC · JPL |
| 571398 Jasonrowe | 2007 LP_{30} | Jasonrowe | June 11, 2007 | Mauna Kea | D. D. Balam, K. M. Perrett | HOF | 2.0 km | MPC · JPL |
| 571399 | 2007 LA_{31} | — | September 28, 2003 | Kitt Peak | Spacewatch | · | 1.7 km | MPC · JPL |
| 571400 | 2007 LJ_{34} | — | June 8, 2007 | Kitt Peak | Spacewatch | · | 3.2 km | MPC · JPL |

== 571401–571500 ==
back to top

| Designation | | | Discovery | | | Properties | | Ref |
| Permanent | Provisional | Named after | Date | Site | Discoverer(s) | Category | Diam. | Ref |
|---|---|---|---|---|---|---|---|---|
| 571401 | 2007 LR_{34} | — | June 9, 2007 | Kitt Peak | Spacewatch | · | 1.4 km | MPC · JPL |
| 571402 | 2007 LX_{38} | — | December 21, 2008 | Mount Bigelow | CSS | (2076) | 740 m | MPC · JPL |
| 571403 | 2007 LR_{39} | — | February 27, 2015 | Mount Lemmon | Mount Lemmon Survey | EUN | 1.1 km | MPC · JPL |
| 571404 | 2007 MG_{2} | — | May 9, 2007 | Kitt Peak | Spacewatch | · | 1.8 km | MPC · JPL |
| 571405 | 2007 MP_{4} | — | June 9, 2007 | Kitt Peak | Spacewatch | MAR | 1.0 km | MPC · JPL |
| 571406 | 2007 MR_{12} | — | June 21, 2007 | Mount Lemmon | Mount Lemmon Survey | · | 1.7 km | MPC · JPL |
| 571407 | 2007 MA_{13} | — | June 21, 2007 | Mount Lemmon | Mount Lemmon Survey | KOR | 1.4 km | MPC · JPL |
| 571408 | 2007 MY_{13} | — | June 20, 2007 | Kitt Peak | Spacewatch | · | 1.9 km | MPC · JPL |
| 571409 | 2007 MA_{18} | — | June 21, 2007 | Mount Lemmon | Mount Lemmon Survey | MAR | 780 m | MPC · JPL |
| 571410 | 2007 MR_{18} | — | September 18, 2003 | Kitt Peak | Spacewatch | · | 2.4 km | MPC · JPL |
| 571411 | 2007 MR_{22} | — | June 22, 2007 | Kitt Peak | Spacewatch | · | 1.6 km | MPC · JPL |
| 571412 | 2007 MU_{27} | — | January 18, 2015 | Haleakala | Pan-STARRS 1 | GAL | 1.8 km | MPC · JPL |
| 571413 | 2007 MX_{27} | — | October 26, 2011 | Haleakala | Pan-STARRS 1 | · | 590 m | MPC · JPL |
| 571414 | 2007 MB_{28} | — | June 16, 2007 | Kitt Peak | Spacewatch | · | 1.7 km | MPC · JPL |
| 571415 | 2007 MF_{29} | — | January 17, 2015 | Haleakala | Pan-STARRS 1 | HNS | 1.1 km | MPC · JPL |
| 571416 | 2007 MH_{29} | — | February 5, 2016 | Haleakala | Pan-STARRS 1 | · | 1.9 km | MPC · JPL |
| 571417 | 2007 MK_{29} | — | September 27, 2016 | Haleakala | Pan-STARRS 1 | · | 1.1 km | MPC · JPL |
| 571418 | 2007 MM_{29} | — | January 7, 2017 | Mount Lemmon | Mount Lemmon Survey | H | 420 m | MPC · JPL |
| 571419 | 2007 NP_{7} | — | February 11, 2014 | Mount Lemmon | Mount Lemmon Survey | MAR | 1.1 km | MPC · JPL |
| 571420 | 2007 OS_{11} | — | October 29, 2008 | Kitt Peak | Spacewatch | · | 710 m | MPC · JPL |
| 571421 | 2007 OY_{11} | — | July 4, 2017 | Haleakala | Pan-STARRS 1 | · | 490 m | MPC · JPL |
| 571422 | 2007 PQ_{3} | — | August 7, 2007 | Siding Spring | SSS | · | 2.1 km | MPC · JPL |
| 571423 | 2007 PH_{5} | — | June 14, 2007 | Kitt Peak | Spacewatch | · | 1.1 km | MPC · JPL |
| 571424 | 2007 PH_{11} | — | August 12, 2007 | Pla D'Arguines | R. Ferrando, Ferrando, M. | GEF | 1.0 km | MPC · JPL |
| 571425 | 2007 PD_{31} | — | July 7, 2007 | Lulin | LUSS | (18466) | 3.0 km | MPC · JPL |
| 571426 | 2007 PA_{51} | — | March 16, 2005 | Mount Lemmon | Mount Lemmon Survey | ADE | 1.8 km | MPC · JPL |
| 571427 | 2007 PW_{51} | — | August 10, 2007 | Kitt Peak | Spacewatch | · | 1.4 km | MPC · JPL |
| 571428 | 2007 PL_{52} | — | June 24, 2011 | Mount Lemmon | Mount Lemmon Survey | · | 1.1 km | MPC · JPL |
| 571429 | 2007 PW_{52} | — | August 10, 2007 | Kitt Peak | Spacewatch | · | 1.5 km | MPC · JPL |
| 571430 | 2007 QV_{1} | — | August 20, 2007 | Bisei | BATTeRS | · | 2.6 km | MPC · JPL |
| 571431 | 2007 QG_{2} | — | August 20, 2007 | Pla D'Arguines | R. Ferrando, Ferrando, M. | · | 1.8 km | MPC · JPL |
| 571432 | 2007 QY_{18} | — | October 16, 2012 | Mount Lemmon | Mount Lemmon Survey | · | 2.5 km | MPC · JPL |
| 571433 | 2007 QC_{19} | — | August 24, 2007 | Kitt Peak | Spacewatch | · | 690 m | MPC · JPL |
| 571434 | 2007 QL_{19} | — | August 18, 2007 | Anderson Mesa | LONEOS | · | 820 m | MPC · JPL |
| 571435 | 2007 RB_{4} | — | September 3, 2007 | Catalina | CSS | · | 1.7 km | MPC · JPL |
| 571436 | 2007 RO_{4} | — | February 9, 2005 | Mount Lemmon | Mount Lemmon Survey | · | 2.6 km | MPC · JPL |
| 571437 | 2007 RT_{5} | — | September 5, 2007 | Dauban | C. Rinner, Kugel, F. | · | 880 m | MPC · JPL |
| 571438 | 2007 RG_{14} | — | September 9, 2007 | Wildberg | R. Apitzsch | T_{j} (2.99) · EUP | 2.8 km | MPC · JPL |
| 571439 | 2007 RZ_{16} | — | February 24, 2006 | Catalina | CSS | H | 620 m | MPC · JPL |
| 571440 | 2007 RB_{30} | — | August 9, 2007 | Kitt Peak | Spacewatch | V | 570 m | MPC · JPL |
| 571441 | 2007 RC_{32} | — | September 5, 2007 | Catalina | CSS | · | 1.3 km | MPC · JPL |
| 571442 | 2007 RP_{52} | — | September 9, 2007 | Kitt Peak | Spacewatch | · | 990 m | MPC · JPL |
| 571443 | 2007 RZ_{52} | — | September 9, 2007 | Kitt Peak | Spacewatch | VER | 2.2 km | MPC · JPL |
| 571444 | 2007 RR_{63} | — | September 10, 2007 | Mount Lemmon | Mount Lemmon Survey | V | 470 m | MPC · JPL |
| 571445 | 2007 RJ_{67} | — | September 10, 2007 | Mount Lemmon | Mount Lemmon Survey | BRA | 1.2 km | MPC · JPL |
| 571446 | 2007 RO_{75} | — | September 10, 2007 | Mount Lemmon | Mount Lemmon Survey | MAR | 910 m | MPC · JPL |
| 571447 | 2007 RN_{77} | — | August 10, 2007 | Kitt Peak | Spacewatch | · | 1.1 km | MPC · JPL |
| 571448 | 2007 RJ_{81} | — | September 10, 2007 | Mount Lemmon | Mount Lemmon Survey | · | 1.9 km | MPC · JPL |
| 571449 | 2007 RX_{84} | — | September 10, 2007 | Mount Lemmon | Mount Lemmon Survey | 3:2 | 4.6 km | MPC · JPL |
| 571450 | 2007 RN_{86} | — | September 10, 2007 | Mount Lemmon | Mount Lemmon Survey | · | 640 m | MPC · JPL |
| 571451 | 2007 RM_{89} | — | September 10, 2007 | Mount Lemmon | Mount Lemmon Survey | · | 1.2 km | MPC · JPL |
| 571452 | 2007 RS_{92} | — | September 10, 2007 | Mount Lemmon | Mount Lemmon Survey | EOS | 1.7 km | MPC · JPL |
| 571453 | 2007 RC_{95} | — | September 10, 2007 | Kitt Peak | Spacewatch | NYS | 700 m | MPC · JPL |
| 571454 | 2007 RK_{96} | — | September 10, 2007 | Kitt Peak | Spacewatch | AGN | 1.1 km | MPC · JPL |
| 571455 | 2007 RX_{101} | — | September 3, 2007 | Catalina | CSS | · | 1.8 km | MPC · JPL |
| 571456 | 2007 RC_{115} | — | September 11, 2007 | Kitt Peak | Spacewatch | EOS | 1.3 km | MPC · JPL |
| 571457 | 2007 RK_{119} | — | September 11, 2007 | XuYi | PMO NEO Survey Program | · | 730 m | MPC · JPL |
| 571458 | 2007 RB_{122} | — | November 21, 2003 | Kitt Peak | Spacewatch | · | 1.4 km | MPC · JPL |
| 571459 | 2007 RC_{125} | — | May 5, 2006 | Kitt Peak | Spacewatch | · | 2.1 km | MPC · JPL |
| 571460 | 2007 RJ_{125} | — | December 18, 2004 | Mount Lemmon | Mount Lemmon Survey | · | 910 m | MPC · JPL |
| 571461 | 2007 RK_{151} | — | September 10, 2007 | Kitt Peak | Spacewatch | · | 2.2 km | MPC · JPL |
| 571462 | 2007 RV_{151} | — | September 10, 2007 | Kitt Peak | Spacewatch | · | 1.9 km | MPC · JPL |
| 571463 | 2007 RA_{156} | — | May 21, 2006 | Kitt Peak | Spacewatch | · | 1.6 km | MPC · JPL |
| 571464 | 2007 RU_{156} | — | August 21, 2007 | Anderson Mesa | LONEOS | · | 710 m | MPC · JPL |
| 571465 | 2007 RL_{157} | — | September 11, 2007 | Mount Lemmon | Mount Lemmon Survey | V | 400 m | MPC · JPL |
| 571466 | 2007 RJ_{176} | — | September 8, 1996 | Kitt Peak | Spacewatch | · | 870 m | MPC · JPL |
| 571467 | 2007 RW_{178} | — | September 10, 2007 | Kitt Peak | Spacewatch | · | 860 m | MPC · JPL |
| 571468 | 2007 RY_{185} | — | September 13, 2007 | Mount Lemmon | Mount Lemmon Survey | · | 1.5 km | MPC · JPL |
| 571469 | 2007 RA_{186} | — | September 13, 2007 | Mount Lemmon | Mount Lemmon Survey | · | 1.8 km | MPC · JPL |
| 571470 | 2007 RR_{187} | — | September 13, 2007 | Mount Lemmon | Mount Lemmon Survey | · | 1.1 km | MPC · JPL |
| 571471 | 2007 RB_{188} | — | February 27, 2015 | Haleakala | Pan-STARRS 1 | KOR | 1.2 km | MPC · JPL |
| 571472 | 2007 RP_{188} | — | August 24, 2007 | Kitt Peak | Spacewatch | · | 550 m | MPC · JPL |
| 571473 | 2007 RA_{192} | — | September 11, 2007 | Kitt Peak | Spacewatch | · | 550 m | MPC · JPL |
| 571474 | 2007 RV_{209} | — | September 10, 2007 | Kitt Peak | Spacewatch | · | 1.2 km | MPC · JPL |
| 571475 | 2007 RN_{211} | — | November 3, 2000 | Kitt Peak | Spacewatch | MAS | 660 m | MPC · JPL |
| 571476 | 2007 RV_{218} | — | September 22, 2003 | Kitt Peak | Spacewatch | · | 1.3 km | MPC · JPL |
| 571477 | 2007 RC_{231} | — | September 11, 2007 | Mount Lemmon | Mount Lemmon Survey | · | 1.4 km | MPC · JPL |
| 571478 | 2007 RV_{234} | — | September 12, 2007 | Mount Lemmon | Mount Lemmon Survey | KOR | 1 km | MPC · JPL |
| 571479 | 2007 RZ_{248} | — | September 13, 2007 | Mount Lemmon | Mount Lemmon Survey | MAS | 560 m | MPC · JPL |
| 571480 | 2007 RG_{254} | — | September 14, 2007 | Kitt Peak | Spacewatch | · | 1.8 km | MPC · JPL |
| 571481 | 2007 RA_{260} | — | September 14, 2007 | Kitt Peak | Spacewatch | · | 1.3 km | MPC · JPL |
| 571482 | 2007 RP_{261} | — | September 10, 2007 | Kitt Peak | Spacewatch | · | 700 m | MPC · JPL |
| 571483 | 2007 RX_{268} | — | September 15, 2007 | Kitt Peak | Spacewatch | NYS | 820 m | MPC · JPL |
| 571484 | 2007 RE_{283} | — | March 24, 2006 | Kitt Peak | Spacewatch | · | 980 m | MPC · JPL |
| 571485 | 2007 RQ_{299} | — | September 12, 2007 | Mount Lemmon | Mount Lemmon Survey | · | 740 m | MPC · JPL |
| 571486 | 2007 RT_{316} | — | September 9, 2007 | Mount Lemmon | Mount Lemmon Survey | KOR | 1.0 km | MPC · JPL |
| 571487 | 2007 RW_{323} | — | September 12, 2007 | Mount Lemmon | Mount Lemmon Survey | MAS | 590 m | MPC · JPL |
| 571488 | 2007 RX_{329} | — | September 10, 2007 | Mount Lemmon | Mount Lemmon Survey | · | 470 m | MPC · JPL |
| 571489 | 2007 RS_{330} | — | September 12, 2007 | Catalina | CSS | · | 530 m | MPC · JPL |
| 571490 | 2007 RB_{332} | — | September 13, 2007 | Mount Lemmon | Mount Lemmon Survey | · | 470 m | MPC · JPL |
| 571491 | 2007 RD_{332} | — | September 13, 2007 | Mount Lemmon | Mount Lemmon Survey | · | 2.1 km | MPC · JPL |
| 571492 | 2007 RZ_{332} | — | September 11, 2007 | Kitt Peak | Spacewatch | KOR | 1.3 km | MPC · JPL |
| 571493 | 2007 RB_{335} | — | September 10, 2007 | Kitt Peak | Spacewatch | · | 1.4 km | MPC · JPL |
| 571494 | 2007 RL_{335} | — | September 9, 2007 | Mount Lemmon | Mount Lemmon Survey | · | 780 m | MPC · JPL |
| 571495 | 2007 RN_{335} | — | September 10, 2007 | Kitt Peak | Spacewatch | · | 1.6 km | MPC · JPL |
| 571496 | 2007 RU_{335} | — | September 12, 2007 | Mount Lemmon | Mount Lemmon Survey | · | 1.6 km | MPC · JPL |
| 571497 | 2007 RV_{335} | — | August 10, 2007 | Kitt Peak | Spacewatch | KOR | 900 m | MPC · JPL |
| 571498 | 2007 RX_{335} | — | September 24, 2012 | Mount Lemmon | Mount Lemmon Survey | AGN | 930 m | MPC · JPL |
| 571499 | 2007 RJ_{337} | — | September 10, 2007 | Mount Lemmon | Mount Lemmon Survey | · | 460 m | MPC · JPL |
| 571500 | 2007 RR_{337} | — | August 24, 2007 | Kitt Peak | Spacewatch | KOR | 1.0 km | MPC · JPL |

== 571501–571600 ==
back to top

| Designation | | | Discovery | | | Properties | | Ref |
| Permanent | Provisional | Named after | Date | Site | Discoverer(s) | Category | Diam. | Ref |
|---|---|---|---|---|---|---|---|---|
| 571501 | 2007 RX_{337} | — | September 13, 2007 | Mount Lemmon | Mount Lemmon Survey | KOR | 1.3 km | MPC · JPL |
| 571502 | 2007 RY_{337} | — | September 11, 2007 | Mount Lemmon | Mount Lemmon Survey | · | 1.6 km | MPC · JPL |
| 571503 | 2007 RM_{340} | — | September 14, 2007 | Mount Lemmon | Mount Lemmon Survey | · | 1.0 km | MPC · JPL |
| 571504 | 2007 RQ_{340} | — | September 5, 2007 | Catalina | CSS | · | 2.7 km | MPC · JPL |
| 571505 | 2007 RU_{340} | — | February 16, 2015 | Haleakala | Pan-STARRS 1 | TIR | 2.2 km | MPC · JPL |
| 571506 | 2007 RT_{341} | — | July 1, 2011 | Kitt Peak | Spacewatch | · | 1.1 km | MPC · JPL |
| 571507 | 2007 RQ_{342} | — | October 20, 2011 | Mount Lemmon | Mount Lemmon Survey | · | 780 m | MPC · JPL |
| 571508 | 2007 RS_{342} | — | August 30, 2002 | Palomar | NEAT | · | 1.5 km | MPC · JPL |
| 571509 | 2007 RZ_{342} | — | October 9, 2016 | Haleakala | Pan-STARRS 1 | · | 1.1 km | MPC · JPL |
| 571510 | 2007 RC_{344} | — | September 10, 2007 | Mount Lemmon | Mount Lemmon Survey | · | 1.5 km | MPC · JPL |
| 571511 | 2007 RC_{345} | — | March 24, 2015 | Mount Lemmon | Mount Lemmon Survey | · | 1.4 km | MPC · JPL |
| 571512 | 2007 RX_{346} | — | September 15, 2007 | Mount Lemmon | Mount Lemmon Survey | KOR | 1.3 km | MPC · JPL |
| 571513 | 2007 RB_{347} | — | September 13, 2007 | Kitt Peak | Spacewatch | · | 1.8 km | MPC · JPL |
| 571514 | 2007 RM_{350} | — | June 2, 2014 | Haleakala | Pan-STARRS 1 | V | 450 m | MPC · JPL |
| 571515 | 2007 RT_{350} | — | September 4, 2007 | Catalina | CSS | · | 960 m | MPC · JPL |
| 571516 | 2007 RL_{352} | — | September 13, 2007 | Mount Lemmon | Mount Lemmon Survey | · | 1.5 km | MPC · JPL |
| 571517 | 2007 RP_{353} | — | September 14, 2007 | Mount Lemmon | Mount Lemmon Survey | KOR | 980 m | MPC · JPL |
| 571518 | 2007 RX_{354} | — | September 14, 2007 | Mount Lemmon | Mount Lemmon Survey | · | 1.3 km | MPC · JPL |
| 571519 | 2007 RD_{355} | — | September 14, 2007 | Mount Lemmon | Mount Lemmon Survey | · | 1.8 km | MPC · JPL |
| 571520 | 2007 RH_{356} | — | September 4, 2007 | Mount Lemmon | Mount Lemmon Survey | KOR | 950 m | MPC · JPL |
| 571521 | 2007 RP_{356} | — | September 12, 2007 | Mount Lemmon | Mount Lemmon Survey | KOR | 1.2 km | MPC · JPL |
| 571522 | 2007 RQ_{357} | — | September 9, 2007 | Mount Lemmon | Mount Lemmon Survey | MAS | 400 m | MPC · JPL |
| 571523 | 2007 RZ_{357} | — | September 14, 2007 | Mount Lemmon | Mount Lemmon Survey | · | 1.4 km | MPC · JPL |
| 571524 | 2007 RE_{368} | — | September 4, 2007 | Mount Lemmon | Mount Lemmon Survey | · | 1.9 km | MPC · JPL |
| 571525 | 2007 SU_{16} | — | July 18, 2007 | Mount Lemmon | Mount Lemmon Survey | V | 640 m | MPC · JPL |
| 571526 | 2007 SQ_{20} | — | September 26, 2007 | Mount Lemmon | Mount Lemmon Survey | NYS | 830 m | MPC · JPL |
| 571527 | 2007 SS_{21} | — | September 12, 2007 | Catalina | CSS | · | 1.2 km | MPC · JPL |
| 571528 | 2007 SC_{24} | — | September 25, 2007 | Mount Lemmon | Mount Lemmon Survey | · | 2.7 km | MPC · JPL |
| 571529 | 2007 SP_{26} | — | September 23, 2017 | Haleakala | Pan-STARRS 1 | KOR | 1.1 km | MPC · JPL |
| 571530 | 2007 SX_{26} | — | September 25, 2007 | Mount Lemmon | Mount Lemmon Survey | (23255) | 1.3 km | MPC · JPL |
| 571531 | 2007 SE_{29} | — | September 19, 2007 | Kitt Peak | Spacewatch | · | 780 m | MPC · JPL |
| 571532 | 2007 TC_{7} | — | October 7, 2007 | Dauban | Kugel, C. R. F. | · | 1.0 km | MPC · JPL |
| 571533 | 2007 TH_{7} | — | October 7, 2007 | Pla D'Arguines | R. Ferrando, Ferrando, M. | V | 570 m | MPC · JPL |
| 571534 | 2007 TN_{8} | — | October 8, 2007 | Catalina | CSS | · | 1.2 km | MPC · JPL |
| 571535 Okunoto | 2007 TO_{15} | Okunoto | October 2, 2007 | Charleston | R. Holmes | V | 720 m | MPC · JPL |
| 571536 | 2007 TO_{29} | — | October 4, 2007 | Kitt Peak | Spacewatch | THM | 2.0 km | MPC · JPL |
| 571537 | 2007 TY_{33} | — | October 6, 2007 | Kitt Peak | Spacewatch | · | 2.0 km | MPC · JPL |
| 571538 | 2007 TM_{38} | — | September 10, 2007 | Kitt Peak | Spacewatch | · | 1.8 km | MPC · JPL |
| 571539 | 2007 TS_{41} | — | September 10, 2007 | Mount Lemmon | Mount Lemmon Survey | · | 1.3 km | MPC · JPL |
| 571540 | 2007 TU_{48} | — | October 4, 2007 | Kitt Peak | Spacewatch | · | 790 m | MPC · JPL |
| 571541 | 2007 TR_{50} | — | October 4, 2007 | Kitt Peak | Spacewatch | URS | 3.0 km | MPC · JPL |
| 571542 | 2007 TE_{51} | — | October 4, 2007 | Kitt Peak | Spacewatch | KOR | 1.4 km | MPC · JPL |
| 571543 | 2007 TF_{54} | — | September 15, 2007 | Kitt Peak | Spacewatch | · | 2.1 km | MPC · JPL |
| 571544 | 2007 TL_{57} | — | September 9, 2007 | Mount Lemmon | Mount Lemmon Survey | · | 1.8 km | MPC · JPL |
| 571545 | 2007 TM_{65} | — | October 7, 2007 | Mount Lemmon | Mount Lemmon Survey | · | 1.0 km | MPC · JPL |
| 571546 | 2007 TP_{68} | — | October 8, 2007 | Catalina | CSS | · | 1.1 km | MPC · JPL |
| 571547 | 2007 TZ_{80} | — | October 7, 2007 | Mount Lemmon | Mount Lemmon Survey | MAS | 420 m | MPC · JPL |
| 571548 | 2007 TW_{85} | — | September 27, 2003 | Kitt Peak | Spacewatch | V | 520 m | MPC · JPL |
| 571549 | 2007 TY_{90} | — | October 8, 2007 | Mount Lemmon | Mount Lemmon Survey | · | 680 m | MPC · JPL |
| 571550 | 2007 TC_{94} | — | October 6, 2000 | Anderson Mesa | LONEOS | · | 870 m | MPC · JPL |
| 571551 | 2007 TO_{100} | — | October 8, 2007 | Mount Lemmon | Mount Lemmon Survey | KOR | 1.3 km | MPC · JPL |
| 571552 | 2007 TD_{107} | — | September 11, 2007 | Mount Lemmon | Mount Lemmon Survey | V | 390 m | MPC · JPL |
| 571553 | 2007 TX_{116} | — | September 20, 2007 | Catalina | CSS | · | 930 m | MPC · JPL |
| 571554 | 2007 TM_{123} | — | October 6, 2007 | Kitt Peak | Spacewatch | · | 1.2 km | MPC · JPL |
| 571555 | 2007 TH_{155} | — | July 5, 2003 | Kitt Peak | Spacewatch | · | 1.3 km | MPC · JPL |
| 571556 | 2007 TK_{157} | — | September 11, 2007 | Mount Lemmon | Mount Lemmon Survey | PHO | 780 m | MPC · JPL |
| 571557 | 2007 TW_{169} | — | October 11, 2007 | Kitt Peak | Spacewatch | · | 930 m | MPC · JPL |
| 571558 | 2007 TN_{171} | — | October 8, 2007 | Črni Vrh | Matičič, S. | · | 1.0 km | MPC · JPL |
| 571559 | 2007 TC_{173} | — | May 2, 2003 | Kitt Peak | Spacewatch | V | 500 m | MPC · JPL |
| 571560 | 2007 TT_{181} | — | October 8, 2007 | Anderson Mesa | LONEOS | · | 1.0 km | MPC · JPL |
| 571561 | 2007 TE_{188} | — | October 15, 2007 | Lulin | LUSS | · | 1.2 km | MPC · JPL |
| 571562 | 2007 TL_{190} | — | September 12, 2007 | Mount Lemmon | Mount Lemmon Survey | KOR | 1.1 km | MPC · JPL |
| 571563 | 2007 TX_{198} | — | October 8, 2007 | Kitt Peak | Spacewatch | · | 910 m | MPC · JPL |
| 571564 | 2007 TA_{205} | — | October 8, 2007 | Mount Lemmon | Mount Lemmon Survey | · | 1.0 km | MPC · JPL |
| 571565 | 2007 TF_{206} | — | October 11, 2007 | Mount Lemmon | Mount Lemmon Survey | · | 640 m | MPC · JPL |
| 571566 | 2007 TP_{207} | — | October 10, 2007 | Mount Lemmon | Mount Lemmon Survey | · | 1.1 km | MPC · JPL |
| 571567 | 2007 TG_{210} | — | October 5, 2007 | Kitt Peak | Spacewatch | PHO | 780 m | MPC · JPL |
| 571568 | 2007 TV_{211} | — | October 7, 2007 | Kitt Peak | Spacewatch | · | 3.1 km | MPC · JPL |
| 571569 | 2007 TW_{219} | — | October 8, 2007 | Mount Lemmon | Mount Lemmon Survey | AGN | 1.3 km | MPC · JPL |
| 571570 | 2007 TA_{220} | — | October 8, 2007 | Mount Lemmon | Mount Lemmon Survey | · | 1.7 km | MPC · JPL |
| 571571 | 2007 TR_{225} | — | September 12, 2007 | Mount Lemmon | Mount Lemmon Survey | · | 1.5 km | MPC · JPL |
| 571572 | 2007 TL_{229} | — | October 8, 2007 | Kitt Peak | Spacewatch | (5) | 1.1 km | MPC · JPL |
| 571573 | 2007 TB_{232} | — | September 10, 2007 | Mount Lemmon | Mount Lemmon Survey | · | 1.5 km | MPC · JPL |
| 571574 | 2007 TH_{236} | — | October 9, 2007 | Mount Lemmon | Mount Lemmon Survey | AEO | 1.0 km | MPC · JPL |
| 571575 | 2007 TX_{238} | — | October 10, 2007 | Mount Lemmon | Mount Lemmon Survey | · | 990 m | MPC · JPL |
| 571576 | 2007 TD_{242} | — | September 13, 2007 | Catalina | CSS | PHO | 1.2 km | MPC · JPL |
| 571577 | 2007 TA_{251} | — | March 12, 2005 | Kitt Peak | Spacewatch | · | 2.0 km | MPC · JPL |
| 571578 | 2007 TB_{257} | — | October 10, 2007 | Kitt Peak | Spacewatch | · | 1.6 km | MPC · JPL |
| 571579 | 2007 TE_{259} | — | October 10, 2007 | Mount Lemmon | Mount Lemmon Survey | · | 1.4 km | MPC · JPL |
| 571580 | 2007 TL_{263} | — | October 10, 2007 | Kitt Peak | Spacewatch | · | 740 m | MPC · JPL |
| 571581 | 2007 TY_{270} | — | October 9, 2007 | Kitt Peak | Spacewatch | NYS | 810 m | MPC · JPL |
| 571582 | 2007 TV_{274} | — | October 11, 2007 | Kitt Peak | Spacewatch | · | 2.0 km | MPC · JPL |
| 571583 | 2007 TG_{285} | — | April 21, 2006 | Kitt Peak | Spacewatch | · | 590 m | MPC · JPL |
| 571584 | 2007 TA_{292} | — | October 13, 2007 | Catalina | CSS | V | 750 m | MPC · JPL |
| 571585 | 2007 TR_{294} | — | October 10, 2007 | Mount Lemmon | Mount Lemmon Survey | · | 1.4 km | MPC · JPL |
| 571586 | 2007 TB_{296} | — | September 14, 2007 | Mount Lemmon | Mount Lemmon Survey | PAD | 1.5 km | MPC · JPL |
| 571587 | 2007 TN_{298} | — | March 8, 2005 | Mount Lemmon | Mount Lemmon Survey | · | 1.9 km | MPC · JPL |
| 571588 | 2007 TM_{299} | — | October 12, 2007 | Kitt Peak | Spacewatch | · | 1.0 km | MPC · JPL |
| 571589 | 2007 TH_{301} | — | October 12, 2007 | Kitt Peak | Spacewatch | · | 600 m | MPC · JPL |
| 571590 | 2007 TF_{308} | — | October 9, 2007 | Mount Lemmon | Mount Lemmon Survey | NYS | 920 m | MPC · JPL |
| 571591 | 2007 TN_{310} | — | October 26, 1995 | Kitt Peak | Spacewatch | · | 800 m | MPC · JPL |
| 571592 | 2007 TU_{310} | — | September 14, 2007 | Mount Lemmon | Mount Lemmon Survey | · | 1.4 km | MPC · JPL |
| 571593 | 2007 TZ_{310} | — | October 11, 2007 | Kitt Peak | Spacewatch | NYS | 790 m | MPC · JPL |
| 571594 | 2007 TE_{316} | — | October 12, 2007 | Kitt Peak | Spacewatch | 3:2 | 4.2 km | MPC · JPL |
| 571595 | 2007 TL_{316} | — | September 15, 2007 | Mount Lemmon | Mount Lemmon Survey | MAS | 490 m | MPC · JPL |
| 571596 | 2007 TC_{319} | — | October 12, 2007 | Kitt Peak | Spacewatch | · | 920 m | MPC · JPL |
| 571597 | 2007 TL_{322} | — | October 11, 2007 | Kitt Peak | Spacewatch | · | 840 m | MPC · JPL |
| 571598 | 2007 TG_{327} | — | October 11, 2007 | Kitt Peak | Spacewatch | · | 1.7 km | MPC · JPL |
| 571599 | 2007 TV_{328} | — | October 11, 2007 | Kitt Peak | Spacewatch | V | 570 m | MPC · JPL |
| 571600 | 2007 TO_{329} | — | August 22, 2001 | Kitt Peak | Spacewatch | · | 1.9 km | MPC · JPL |

== 571601–571700 ==
back to top

| Designation | | | Discovery | | | Properties | | Ref |
| Permanent | Provisional | Named after | Date | Site | Discoverer(s) | Category | Diam. | Ref |
|---|---|---|---|---|---|---|---|---|
| 571601 | 2007 TV_{331} | — | September 26, 2007 | Mount Lemmon | Mount Lemmon Survey | · | 1.1 km | MPC · JPL |
| 571602 | 2007 TO_{342} | — | October 10, 2007 | Mount Lemmon | Mount Lemmon Survey | · | 1.5 km | MPC · JPL |
| 571603 | 2007 TZ_{344} | — | October 11, 2007 | Mount Lemmon | Mount Lemmon Survey | · | 620 m | MPC · JPL |
| 571604 | 2007 TT_{346} | — | October 13, 2007 | Mount Lemmon | Mount Lemmon Survey | · | 1.8 km | MPC · JPL |
| 571605 | 2007 TK_{366} | — | August 23, 2003 | Palomar | NEAT | V | 720 m | MPC · JPL |
| 571606 | 2007 TA_{370} | — | October 11, 2007 | Mount Lemmon | Mount Lemmon Survey | · | 1.5 km | MPC · JPL |
| 571607 | 2007 TZ_{374} | — | October 15, 2007 | Mount Lemmon | Mount Lemmon Survey | AGN | 1.2 km | MPC · JPL |
| 571608 | 2007 TK_{375} | — | September 13, 2007 | Mount Lemmon | Mount Lemmon Survey | BRA | 1.1 km | MPC · JPL |
| 571609 | 2007 TR_{384} | — | October 14, 2007 | Mount Lemmon | Mount Lemmon Survey | · | 2.2 km | MPC · JPL |
| 571610 | 2007 TD_{389} | — | October 13, 2007 | Mount Lemmon | Mount Lemmon Survey | · | 2.2 km | MPC · JPL |
| 571611 | 2007 TG_{394} | — | October 15, 2007 | Kitt Peak | Spacewatch | · | 1.0 km | MPC · JPL |
| 571612 | 2007 TB_{396} | — | January 19, 2005 | Kitt Peak | Spacewatch | · | 1.0 km | MPC · JPL |
| 571613 | 2007 TU_{399} | — | July 24, 2003 | Palomar | NEAT | · | 1.2 km | MPC · JPL |
| 571614 | 2007 TO_{426} | — | October 9, 2007 | Kitt Peak | Spacewatch | · | 1.1 km | MPC · JPL |
| 571615 | 2007 TZ_{429} | — | October 8, 2007 | Kitt Peak | Spacewatch | EOS | 1.5 km | MPC · JPL |
| 571616 | 2007 TU_{436} | — | October 25, 2016 | Haleakala | Pan-STARRS 1 | · | 1.1 km | MPC · JPL |
| 571617 | 2007 TR_{439} | — | October 8, 2007 | Mount Lemmon | Mount Lemmon Survey | · | 1.6 km | MPC · JPL |
| 571618 | 2007 TF_{447} | — | October 11, 2007 | Kitt Peak | Spacewatch | · | 910 m | MPC · JPL |
| 571619 | 2007 TU_{456} | — | October 7, 2007 | Mount Lemmon | Mount Lemmon Survey | · | 2.2 km | MPC · JPL |
| 571620 | 2007 TA_{458} | — | February 8, 2005 | Mauna Kea | Veillet, C. | · | 870 m | MPC · JPL |
| 571621 | 2007 TZ_{460} | — | January 23, 2015 | Haleakala | Pan-STARRS 1 | · | 2.2 km | MPC · JPL |
| 571622 | 2007 TB_{461} | — | September 28, 1997 | Kitt Peak | Spacewatch | · | 1.8 km | MPC · JPL |
| 571623 | 2007 TD_{461} | — | January 27, 2015 | Haleakala | Pan-STARRS 1 | BRA | 1.2 km | MPC · JPL |
| 571624 | 2007 TZ_{461} | — | September 24, 2012 | Kitt Peak | Spacewatch | · | 1.7 km | MPC · JPL |
| 571625 | 2007 TE_{462} | — | October 7, 2007 | Mount Lemmon | Mount Lemmon Survey | KOR | 1.0 km | MPC · JPL |
| 571626 | 2007 TT_{463} | — | October 12, 2007 | Kitt Peak | Spacewatch | EOS | 1.5 km | MPC · JPL |
| 571627 | 2007 TZ_{463} | — | March 21, 2015 | Haleakala | Pan-STARRS 1 | · | 1.4 km | MPC · JPL |
| 571628 | 2007 TJ_{466} | — | October 22, 2017 | Mount Lemmon | Mount Lemmon Survey | · | 2.4 km | MPC · JPL |
| 571629 | 2007 TU_{466} | — | October 11, 2007 | Mount Lemmon | Mount Lemmon Survey | · | 850 m | MPC · JPL |
| 571630 | 2007 TG_{467} | — | November 28, 2011 | Mount Lemmon | Mount Lemmon Survey | PHO | 930 m | MPC · JPL |
| 571631 | 2007 TW_{469} | — | October 11, 2007 | Kitt Peak | Spacewatch | · | 830 m | MPC · JPL |
| 571632 | 2007 TC_{470} | — | February 26, 2014 | Haleakala | Pan-STARRS 1 | · | 1.3 km | MPC · JPL |
| 571633 | 2007 TH_{470} | — | October 12, 2007 | Mount Lemmon | Mount Lemmon Survey | · | 1.8 km | MPC · JPL |
| 571634 | 2007 TR_{474} | — | October 4, 2007 | Kitt Peak | Spacewatch | KOR | 1.1 km | MPC · JPL |
| 571635 | 2007 TT_{474} | — | October 12, 2007 | Mount Lemmon | Mount Lemmon Survey | · | 1.5 km | MPC · JPL |
| 571636 | 2007 TB_{475} | — | October 15, 2007 | Mount Lemmon | Mount Lemmon Survey | HOF | 2.2 km | MPC · JPL |
| 571637 | 2007 TD_{475} | — | January 29, 2009 | Mount Lemmon | Mount Lemmon Survey | EOS | 1.3 km | MPC · JPL |
| 571638 | 2007 TK_{475} | — | December 23, 2017 | Haleakala | Pan-STARRS 1 | · | 1.3 km | MPC · JPL |
| 571639 | 2007 TP_{475} | — | October 15, 2007 | Kitt Peak | Spacewatch | · | 1.2 km | MPC · JPL |
| 571640 | 2007 TM_{476} | — | October 28, 2011 | Mount Lemmon | Mount Lemmon Survey | PHO | 670 m | MPC · JPL |
| 571641 | 2007 TB_{477} | — | January 7, 2014 | Mount Lemmon | Mount Lemmon Survey | · | 1.3 km | MPC · JPL |
| 571642 | 2007 TQ_{477} | — | October 12, 2007 | Mount Lemmon | Mount Lemmon Survey | · | 1.7 km | MPC · JPL |
| 571643 | 2007 TZ_{478} | — | October 9, 2012 | Haleakala | Pan-STARRS 1 | · | 1.5 km | MPC · JPL |
| 571644 | 2007 TU_{480} | — | October 15, 2007 | Mount Lemmon | Mount Lemmon Survey | · | 1.3 km | MPC · JPL |
| 571645 | 2007 TN_{481} | — | October 10, 2007 | Kitt Peak | Spacewatch | THM | 1.8 km | MPC · JPL |
| 571646 | 2007 TP_{481} | — | October 12, 2007 | Kitt Peak | Spacewatch | KOR | 950 m | MPC · JPL |
| 571647 | 2007 TJ_{482} | — | October 15, 2007 | Mount Lemmon | Mount Lemmon Survey | · | 1.8 km | MPC · JPL |
| 571648 | 2007 TA_{483} | — | October 7, 2007 | Kitt Peak | Spacewatch | · | 1.8 km | MPC · JPL |
| 571649 | 2007 TL_{484} | — | October 4, 2007 | Mount Lemmon | Mount Lemmon Survey | · | 1.6 km | MPC · JPL |
| 571650 | 2007 TO_{484} | — | October 7, 2007 | Mount Lemmon | Mount Lemmon Survey | KOR | 1.2 km | MPC · JPL |
| 571651 | 2007 TW_{484} | — | October 11, 2007 | Mount Lemmon | Mount Lemmon Survey | · | 1.3 km | MPC · JPL |
| 571652 | 2007 TC_{485} | — | April 11, 2005 | Mount Lemmon | Mount Lemmon Survey | HOF | 2.3 km | MPC · JPL |
| 571653 | 2007 TG_{486} | — | October 8, 2007 | Mount Lemmon | Mount Lemmon Survey | · | 1.3 km | MPC · JPL |
| 571654 | 2007 TO_{487} | — | October 9, 2007 | Kitt Peak | Spacewatch | · | 1.5 km | MPC · JPL |
| 571655 | 2007 TP_{487} | — | October 12, 2007 | Kitt Peak | Spacewatch | · | 1.5 km | MPC · JPL |
| 571656 | 2007 TV_{488} | — | October 13, 2007 | Mount Lemmon | Mount Lemmon Survey | · | 560 m | MPC · JPL |
| 571657 | 2007 TK_{489} | — | October 15, 2007 | Mount Lemmon | Mount Lemmon Survey | · | 1.6 km | MPC · JPL |
| 571658 | 2007 TN_{490} | — | October 9, 2007 | Kitt Peak | Spacewatch | · | 2.0 km | MPC · JPL |
| 571659 | 2007 TZ_{490} | — | October 12, 2007 | Kitt Peak | Spacewatch | V | 530 m | MPC · JPL |
| 571660 | 2007 TW_{491} | — | October 8, 2007 | Mount Lemmon | Mount Lemmon Survey | · | 1.0 km | MPC · JPL |
| 571661 | 2007 TW_{494} | — | October 15, 2007 | Mount Lemmon | Mount Lemmon Survey | · | 1.4 km | MPC · JPL |
| 571662 | 2007 TY_{494} | — | October 14, 2007 | Mount Lemmon | Mount Lemmon Survey | · | 2.7 km | MPC · JPL |
| 571663 | 2007 UO_{13} | — | October 17, 2007 | Mount Lemmon | Mount Lemmon Survey | · | 2.0 km | MPC · JPL |
| 571664 | 2007 UK_{17} | — | September 12, 2007 | Mount Lemmon | Mount Lemmon Survey | V | 430 m | MPC · JPL |
| 571665 | 2007 US_{17} | — | October 13, 2007 | Dauban | Kugel, C. R. F. | · | 2.4 km | MPC · JPL |
| 571666 | 2007 UH_{21} | — | October 16, 2007 | Kitt Peak | Spacewatch | · | 1.3 km | MPC · JPL |
| 571667 | 2007 UO_{22} | — | October 7, 2007 | Mount Lemmon | Mount Lemmon Survey | · | 1.1 km | MPC · JPL |
| 571668 | 2007 UP_{23} | — | October 8, 2007 | Mount Lemmon | Mount Lemmon Survey | · | 1.6 km | MPC · JPL |
| 571669 | 2007 US_{28} | — | October 16, 2007 | Catalina | CSS | · | 960 m | MPC · JPL |
| 571670 | 2007 UJ_{34} | — | October 18, 2007 | Kitt Peak | Spacewatch | · | 1.8 km | MPC · JPL |
| 571671 | 2007 UQ_{38} | — | September 26, 2000 | Kitt Peak | Spacewatch | V | 590 m | MPC · JPL |
| 571672 | 2007 UK_{45} | — | October 18, 2007 | Kitt Peak | Spacewatch | PHO | 710 m | MPC · JPL |
| 571673 | 2007 UK_{53} | — | October 30, 2007 | Kitt Peak | Spacewatch | · | 2.0 km | MPC · JPL |
| 571674 | 2007 UK_{54} | — | October 30, 2007 | Kitt Peak | Spacewatch | MAS | 580 m | MPC · JPL |
| 571675 | 2007 UH_{60} | — | May 20, 2006 | Kitt Peak | Spacewatch | EUN | 840 m | MPC · JPL |
| 571676 | 2007 UB_{61} | — | October 30, 2007 | Mount Lemmon | Mount Lemmon Survey | · | 960 m | MPC · JPL |
| 571677 | 2007 UV_{64} | — | February 21, 2002 | Kitt Peak | Spacewatch | · | 650 m | MPC · JPL |
| 571678 | 2007 UA_{69} | — | October 30, 2007 | Mount Lemmon | Mount Lemmon Survey | · | 1.6 km | MPC · JPL |
| 571679 | 2007 UK_{73} | — | October 31, 2007 | Mount Lemmon | Mount Lemmon Survey | KOR | 1.1 km | MPC · JPL |
| 571680 | 2007 UW_{73} | — | October 31, 2007 | Mount Lemmon | Mount Lemmon Survey | · | 970 m | MPC · JPL |
| 571681 | 2007 UZ_{77} | — | October 18, 2007 | Kitt Peak | Spacewatch | · | 2.2 km | MPC · JPL |
| 571682 | 2007 UU_{79} | — | October 30, 2007 | Mount Lemmon | Mount Lemmon Survey | · | 1.8 km | MPC · JPL |
| 571683 | 2007 UZ_{82} | — | March 9, 2005 | Mount Lemmon | Mount Lemmon Survey | MAS | 570 m | MPC · JPL |
| 571684 | 2007 UJ_{83} | — | October 30, 2007 | Kitt Peak | Spacewatch | · | 1.8 km | MPC · JPL |
| 571685 | 2007 US_{84} | — | October 30, 2007 | Kitt Peak | Spacewatch | · | 1.1 km | MPC · JPL |
| 571686 | 2007 UQ_{88} | — | October 10, 2007 | Kitt Peak | Spacewatch | · | 1.1 km | MPC · JPL |
| 571687 | 2007 UU_{89} | — | October 30, 2007 | Mount Lemmon | Mount Lemmon Survey | · | 880 m | MPC · JPL |
| 571688 | 2007 UH_{91} | — | September 12, 2007 | Mount Lemmon | Mount Lemmon Survey | KOR | 1.4 km | MPC · JPL |
| 571689 | 2007 UD_{92} | — | October 31, 2007 | Mount Lemmon | Mount Lemmon Survey | · | 1.6 km | MPC · JPL |
| 571690 | 2007 UL_{95} | — | October 8, 2007 | Bergisch Gladbach | W. Bickel | · | 580 m | MPC · JPL |
| 571691 | 2007 UR_{100} | — | October 16, 2007 | Mount Lemmon | Mount Lemmon Survey | · | 1.9 km | MPC · JPL |
| 571692 | 2007 UK_{103} | — | October 30, 2007 | Mount Lemmon | Mount Lemmon Survey | · | 1.2 km | MPC · JPL |
| 571693 | 2007 UV_{104} | — | October 30, 2007 | Kitt Peak | Spacewatch | · | 930 m | MPC · JPL |
| 571694 | 2007 UR_{106} | — | October 19, 2007 | Kitt Peak | Spacewatch | · | 1.1 km | MPC · JPL |
| 571695 | 2007 UL_{117} | — | October 31, 2007 | Mount Lemmon | Mount Lemmon Survey | · | 900 m | MPC · JPL |
| 571696 | 2007 UD_{132} | — | October 18, 2007 | Kitt Peak | Spacewatch | · | 1.3 km | MPC · JPL |
| 571697 | 2007 UW_{143} | — | October 16, 2007 | Mount Lemmon | Mount Lemmon Survey | HNS | 920 m | MPC · JPL |
| 571698 | 2007 UP_{144} | — | October 19, 2007 | Mount Lemmon | Mount Lemmon Survey | · | 3.0 km | MPC · JPL |
| 571699 | 2007 UQ_{144} | — | October 20, 2007 | Mount Lemmon | Mount Lemmon Survey | · | 660 m | MPC · JPL |
| 571700 | 2007 UY_{144} | — | October 21, 2007 | Mount Lemmon | Mount Lemmon Survey | · | 1.6 km | MPC · JPL |

== 571701–571800 ==
back to top

| Designation | | | Discovery | | | Properties | | Ref |
| Permanent | Provisional | Named after | Date | Site | Discoverer(s) | Category | Diam. | Ref |
|---|---|---|---|---|---|---|---|---|
| 571701 | 2007 UY_{145} | — | October 15, 2012 | Haleakala | Pan-STARRS 1 | · | 1.7 km | MPC · JPL |
| 571702 | 2007 UK_{146} | — | October 20, 2007 | Mount Lemmon | Mount Lemmon Survey | · | 1.2 km | MPC · JPL |
| 571703 | 2007 UN_{146} | — | September 10, 2016 | Mount Lemmon | Mount Lemmon Survey | · | 2.0 km | MPC · JPL |
| 571704 | 2007 UR_{146} | — | October 16, 2007 | Mount Lemmon | Mount Lemmon Survey | · | 1.7 km | MPC · JPL |
| 571705 | 2007 UH_{148} | — | October 23, 2011 | Kitt Peak | Spacewatch | · | 1.1 km | MPC · JPL |
| 571706 | 2007 UW_{148} | — | October 20, 2007 | Kitt Peak | Spacewatch | · | 1.5 km | MPC · JPL |
| 571707 | 2007 UA_{149} | — | October 16, 2007 | Mount Lemmon | Mount Lemmon Survey | · | 2.0 km | MPC · JPL |
| 571708 | 2007 UQ_{149} | — | February 8, 2014 | Mount Lemmon | Mount Lemmon Survey | · | 1.4 km | MPC · JPL |
| 571709 | 2007 UC_{150} | — | January 13, 2018 | Mount Lemmon | Mount Lemmon Survey | · | 1.7 km | MPC · JPL |
| 571710 | 2007 UA_{151} | — | November 12, 2013 | Kitt Peak | Spacewatch | · | 1.7 km | MPC · JPL |
| 571711 | 2007 UX_{151} | — | January 24, 2014 | Haleakala | Pan-STARRS 1 | · | 1.9 km | MPC · JPL |
| 571712 | 2007 UB_{152} | — | October 8, 2012 | Kitt Peak | Spacewatch | · | 1.6 km | MPC · JPL |
| 571713 | 2007 UD_{152} | — | October 20, 2007 | Mount Lemmon | Mount Lemmon Survey | · | 1.9 km | MPC · JPL |
| 571714 | 2007 UM_{152} | — | October 21, 2007 | Mount Lemmon | Mount Lemmon Survey | BAP | 770 m | MPC · JPL |
| 571715 | 2007 UA_{154} | — | October 16, 2012 | Mount Lemmon | Mount Lemmon Survey | KOR | 1.1 km | MPC · JPL |
| 571716 | 2007 UD_{155} | — | October 18, 2007 | Mount Lemmon | Mount Lemmon Survey | · | 1.3 km | MPC · JPL |
| 571717 | 2007 UK_{155} | — | October 20, 2007 | Mount Lemmon | Mount Lemmon Survey | KOR | 1.2 km | MPC · JPL |
| 571718 | 2007 UF_{156} | — | October 21, 2007 | Mount Lemmon | Mount Lemmon Survey | · | 800 m | MPC · JPL |
| 571719 | 2007 UQ_{156} | — | October 30, 2007 | Mount Lemmon | Mount Lemmon Survey | KOR | 1.1 km | MPC · JPL |
| 571720 | 2007 UM_{161} | — | October 16, 2007 | Mount Lemmon | Mount Lemmon Survey | · | 1.7 km | MPC · JPL |
| 571721 | 2007 VN_{5} | — | November 4, 2007 | La Sagra | OAM | · | 2.9 km | MPC · JPL |
| 571722 | 2007 VC_{23} | — | October 12, 2007 | Kitt Peak | Spacewatch | · | 1.7 km | MPC · JPL |
| 571723 | 2007 VE_{24} | — | October 9, 2007 | Kitt Peak | Spacewatch | PAD | 1.8 km | MPC · JPL |
| 571724 | 2007 VJ_{28} | — | November 2, 2007 | Mount Lemmon | Mount Lemmon Survey | · | 1.5 km | MPC · JPL |
| 571725 | 2007 VL_{29} | — | November 3, 2007 | Mount Lemmon | Mount Lemmon Survey | · | 1.5 km | MPC · JPL |
| 571726 | 2007 VL_{32} | — | November 2, 2007 | Kitt Peak | Spacewatch | EOS | 1.7 km | MPC · JPL |
| 571727 | 2007 VR_{32} | — | October 15, 2007 | Kitt Peak | Spacewatch | · | 1.5 km | MPC · JPL |
| 571728 | 2007 VL_{39} | — | October 8, 2007 | Mount Lemmon | Mount Lemmon Survey | · | 890 m | MPC · JPL |
| 571729 | 2007 VH_{42} | — | October 12, 2007 | Mount Lemmon | Mount Lemmon Survey | · | 2.1 km | MPC · JPL |
| 571730 | 2007 VN_{42} | — | November 3, 2007 | Mount Lemmon | Mount Lemmon Survey | EOS | 1.7 km | MPC · JPL |
| 571731 | 2007 VH_{44} | — | November 1, 2007 | Kitt Peak | Spacewatch | · | 2.6 km | MPC · JPL |
| 571732 | 2007 VB_{46} | — | March 20, 2002 | Kitt Peak | Deep Ecliptic Survey | · | 820 m | MPC · JPL |
| 571733 | 2007 VQ_{49} | — | November 1, 2007 | Kitt Peak | Spacewatch | · | 2.1 km | MPC · JPL |
| 571734 | 2007 VL_{57} | — | October 20, 2007 | Mount Lemmon | Mount Lemmon Survey | · | 1.5 km | MPC · JPL |
| 571735 | 2007 VA_{71} | — | November 4, 2007 | Mount Lemmon | Mount Lemmon Survey | · | 1.4 km | MPC · JPL |
| 571736 | 2007 VN_{75} | — | November 3, 2007 | Kitt Peak | Spacewatch | HYG | 2.2 km | MPC · JPL |
| 571737 | 2007 VJ_{82} | — | November 4, 2007 | Kitt Peak | Spacewatch | · | 1.4 km | MPC · JPL |
| 571738 | 2007 VP_{85} | — | October 8, 2007 | Catalina | CSS | BRA | 1.2 km | MPC · JPL |
| 571739 | 2007 VJ_{107} | — | November 3, 2007 | Kitt Peak | Spacewatch | · | 1.9 km | MPC · JPL |
| 571740 | 2007 VQ_{113} | — | November 3, 2007 | Kitt Peak | Spacewatch | EOS | 1.6 km | MPC · JPL |
| 571741 | 2007 VT_{113} | — | October 15, 2007 | Mount Lemmon | Mount Lemmon Survey | · | 2.0 km | MPC · JPL |
| 571742 | 2007 VM_{114} | — | November 3, 2007 | Kitt Peak | Spacewatch | · | 1.7 km | MPC · JPL |
| 571743 | 2007 VG_{117} | — | November 3, 2007 | Kitt Peak | Spacewatch | (6769) | 790 m | MPC · JPL |
| 571744 | 2007 VC_{118} | — | November 4, 2007 | Kitt Peak | Spacewatch | KOR | 1.2 km | MPC · JPL |
| 571745 | 2007 VU_{119} | — | October 14, 2007 | Kitt Peak | Spacewatch | · | 550 m | MPC · JPL |
| 571746 | 2007 VU_{124} | — | September 28, 2003 | Kitt Peak | Spacewatch | · | 1.5 km | MPC · JPL |
| 571747 | 2007 VB_{125} | — | November 5, 2007 | Kitt Peak | Spacewatch | · | 710 m | MPC · JPL |
| 571748 | 2007 VS_{133} | — | September 9, 2007 | Mount Lemmon | Mount Lemmon Survey | · | 2.6 km | MPC · JPL |
| 571749 | 2007 VX_{146} | — | November 4, 2007 | Kitt Peak | Spacewatch | · | 2.2 km | MPC · JPL |
| 571750 | 2007 VW_{148} | — | September 14, 2007 | Mount Lemmon | Mount Lemmon Survey | · | 1.8 km | MPC · JPL |
| 571751 | 2007 VS_{151} | — | January 16, 2005 | Kitt Peak | Spacewatch | · | 1.1 km | MPC · JPL |
| 571752 | 2007 VW_{151} | — | October 18, 2007 | Kitt Peak | Spacewatch | · | 570 m | MPC · JPL |
| 571753 | 2007 VZ_{151} | — | November 2, 2007 | Mount Lemmon | Mount Lemmon Survey | · | 1.0 km | MPC · JPL |
| 571754 | 2007 VN_{152} | — | October 24, 2007 | Mount Lemmon | Mount Lemmon Survey | · | 930 m | MPC · JPL |
| 571755 | 2007 VL_{157} | — | November 5, 2007 | Kitt Peak | Spacewatch | · | 1.6 km | MPC · JPL |
| 571756 | 2007 VB_{159} | — | November 5, 2007 | Kitt Peak | Spacewatch | EOS | 1.8 km | MPC · JPL |
| 571757 | 2007 VR_{160} | — | November 5, 2007 | Kitt Peak | Spacewatch | EOS | 1.9 km | MPC · JPL |
| 571758 | 2007 VS_{163} | — | November 5, 2007 | Kitt Peak | Spacewatch | · | 1.3 km | MPC · JPL |
| 571759 | 2007 VQ_{164} | — | October 14, 2007 | Mount Lemmon | Mount Lemmon Survey | · | 1.4 km | MPC · JPL |
| 571760 | 2007 VU_{172} | — | November 2, 2007 | Mount Lemmon | Mount Lemmon Survey | · | 790 m | MPC · JPL |
| 571761 | 2007 VT_{181} | — | November 8, 2007 | Mount Lemmon | Mount Lemmon Survey | T_{j} (2.96) | 4.5 km | MPC · JPL |
| 571762 | 2007 VH_{191} | — | November 4, 2007 | Kitt Peak | Spacewatch | MAS | 580 m | MPC · JPL |
| 571763 | 2007 VN_{197} | — | November 8, 2007 | Kitt Peak | Spacewatch | SUL | 1.7 km | MPC · JPL |
| 571764 | 2007 VB_{200} | — | October 30, 2007 | Mount Lemmon | Mount Lemmon Survey | · | 690 m | MPC · JPL |
| 571765 | 2007 VC_{205} | — | October 18, 2007 | Kitt Peak | Spacewatch | · | 960 m | MPC · JPL |
| 571766 | 2007 VD_{211} | — | November 9, 2007 | Kitt Peak | Spacewatch | · | 1.0 km | MPC · JPL |
| 571767 | 2007 VO_{212} | — | April 4, 2005 | Mount Lemmon | Mount Lemmon Survey | AGN | 1.1 km | MPC · JPL |
| 571768 | 2007 VA_{213} | — | November 9, 2007 | Kitt Peak | Spacewatch | TEL | 1.0 km | MPC · JPL |
| 571769 | 2007 VS_{213} | — | November 9, 2007 | Kitt Peak | Spacewatch | HYG | 2.0 km | MPC · JPL |
| 571770 | 2007 VM_{220} | — | November 9, 2007 | Kitt Peak | Spacewatch | · | 1.8 km | MPC · JPL |
| 571771 | 2007 VX_{220} | — | November 12, 2007 | Mount Lemmon | Mount Lemmon Survey | KOR | 1.1 km | MPC · JPL |
| 571772 | 2007 VZ_{223} | — | November 7, 2007 | Kitt Peak | Spacewatch | 3:2 | 4.4 km | MPC · JPL |
| 571773 | 2007 VM_{226} | — | October 16, 2007 | Kitt Peak | Spacewatch | · | 1.6 km | MPC · JPL |
| 571774 | 2007 VU_{227} | — | October 12, 2007 | Mount Lemmon | Mount Lemmon Survey | · | 1.5 km | MPC · JPL |
| 571775 | 2007 VA_{229} | — | October 17, 2007 | Mount Lemmon | Mount Lemmon Survey | · | 2.3 km | MPC · JPL |
| 571776 | 2007 VP_{230} | — | November 7, 2007 | Kitt Peak | Spacewatch | · | 910 m | MPC · JPL |
| 571777 | 2007 VW_{231} | — | October 16, 2007 | Mount Lemmon | Mount Lemmon Survey | · | 1.7 km | MPC · JPL |
| 571778 | 2007 VR_{246} | — | November 9, 2007 | Mount Lemmon | Mount Lemmon Survey | · | 910 m | MPC · JPL |
| 571779 | 2007 VJ_{261} | — | October 9, 2007 | Kitt Peak | Spacewatch | · | 2.1 km | MPC · JPL |
| 571780 | 2007 VP_{261} | — | November 13, 2007 | Mount Lemmon | Mount Lemmon Survey | · | 680 m | MPC · JPL |
| 571781 | 2007 VW_{261} | — | October 9, 2007 | Mount Lemmon | Mount Lemmon Survey | KOR | 1.2 km | MPC · JPL |
| 571782 | 2007 VD_{274} | — | October 20, 2007 | Mount Lemmon | Mount Lemmon Survey | · | 920 m | MPC · JPL |
| 571783 | 2007 VN_{286} | — | November 14, 2007 | Kitt Peak | Spacewatch | · | 1.4 km | MPC · JPL |
| 571784 | 2007 VV_{287} | — | November 12, 2007 | Mount Lemmon | Mount Lemmon Survey | · | 2.0 km | MPC · JPL |
| 571785 | 2007 VU_{288} | — | October 14, 2007 | Mount Lemmon | Mount Lemmon Survey | · | 1.8 km | MPC · JPL |
| 571786 | 2007 VA_{301} | — | October 30, 2007 | Catalina | CSS | · | 550 m | MPC · JPL |
| 571787 | 2007 VA_{318} | — | October 8, 2007 | Mount Lemmon | Mount Lemmon Survey | · | 1.1 km | MPC · JPL |
| 571788 | 2007 VV_{319} | — | November 2, 2007 | Socorro | LINEAR | EOS | 2.1 km | MPC · JPL |
| 571789 | 2007 VW_{325} | — | July 5, 2003 | Kitt Peak | Spacewatch | · | 1.1 km | MPC · JPL |
| 571790 | 2007 VH_{327} | — | November 7, 2007 | Catalina | CSS | · | 2.0 km | MPC · JPL |
| 571791 | 2007 VX_{336} | — | October 9, 2007 | XuYi | PMO NEO Survey Program | · | 770 m | MPC · JPL |
| 571792 | 2007 VB_{338} | — | November 3, 2007 | Mount Lemmon | Mount Lemmon Survey | · | 1.7 km | MPC · JPL |
| 571793 | 2007 VF_{339} | — | November 8, 2007 | Kitt Peak | Spacewatch | · | 2.5 km | MPC · JPL |
| 571794 | 2007 VR_{339} | — | November 3, 2007 | Kitt Peak | Spacewatch | · | 1.7 km | MPC · JPL |
| 571795 | 2007 VP_{340} | — | November 4, 2007 | Mount Lemmon | Mount Lemmon Survey | · | 2.4 km | MPC · JPL |
| 571796 | 2007 VQ_{340} | — | November 4, 2007 | Mount Lemmon | Mount Lemmon Survey | NAE | 1.9 km | MPC · JPL |
| 571797 | 2007 VZ_{341} | — | November 12, 2007 | Mount Lemmon | Mount Lemmon Survey | · | 1.9 km | MPC · JPL |
| 571798 | 2007 VP_{342} | — | November 13, 2007 | Mount Lemmon | Mount Lemmon Survey | · | 2.6 km | MPC · JPL |
| 571799 | 2007 VY_{343} | — | October 21, 2012 | Haleakala | Pan-STARRS 1 | EOS | 1.4 km | MPC · JPL |
| 571800 | 2007 VA_{344} | — | March 19, 2013 | Haleakala | Pan-STARRS 1 | · | 950 m | MPC · JPL |

== 571801–571900 ==
back to top

| Designation | | | Discovery | | | Properties | | Ref |
| Permanent | Provisional | Named after | Date | Site | Discoverer(s) | Category | Diam. | Ref |
|---|---|---|---|---|---|---|---|---|
| 571801 | 2007 VC_{344} | — | November 12, 2007 | Mount Lemmon | Mount Lemmon Survey | · | 2.1 km | MPC · JPL |
| 571802 | 2007 VL_{344} | — | November 7, 2007 | Kitt Peak | Spacewatch | TIR | 2.7 km | MPC · JPL |
| 571803 | 2007 VP_{344} | — | July 11, 2016 | Haleakala | Pan-STARRS 1 | EOS | 1.9 km | MPC · JPL |
| 571804 | 2007 VT_{344} | — | November 9, 2007 | Kitt Peak | Spacewatch | EOS | 1.7 km | MPC · JPL |
| 571805 | 2007 VM_{346} | — | November 2, 2007 | Kitt Peak | Spacewatch | 3:2 | 5.0 km | MPC · JPL |
| 571806 | 2007 VO_{348} | — | January 26, 2014 | Haleakala | Pan-STARRS 1 | · | 1.7 km | MPC · JPL |
| 571807 | 2007 VQ_{348} | — | November 5, 2007 | Mount Lemmon | Mount Lemmon Survey | · | 2.0 km | MPC · JPL |
| 571808 | 2007 VU_{348} | — | June 18, 2015 | Haleakala | Pan-STARRS 1 | · | 1.4 km | MPC · JPL |
| 571809 | 2007 VF_{350} | — | January 21, 2014 | Kitt Peak | Spacewatch | EOS | 1.4 km | MPC · JPL |
| 571810 | 2007 VB_{351} | — | October 1, 2017 | Haleakala | Pan-STARRS 1 | · | 1.4 km | MPC · JPL |
| 571811 | 2007 VH_{351} | — | November 8, 2007 | Mount Lemmon | Mount Lemmon Survey | · | 1.6 km | MPC · JPL |
| 571812 | 2007 VP_{351} | — | November 5, 2007 | Mount Lemmon | Mount Lemmon Survey | · | 3.0 km | MPC · JPL |
| 571813 | 2007 VN_{352} | — | December 11, 2013 | Haleakala | Pan-STARRS 1 | · | 2.1 km | MPC · JPL |
| 571814 | 2007 VO_{352} | — | November 7, 2007 | Kitt Peak | Spacewatch | · | 1.9 km | MPC · JPL |
| 571815 | 2007 VQ_{352} | — | September 2, 2017 | Haleakala | Pan-STARRS 1 | · | 2.9 km | MPC · JPL |
| 571816 | 2007 VH_{355} | — | November 8, 2007 | Kitt Peak | Spacewatch | · | 1.4 km | MPC · JPL |
| 571817 | 2007 VM_{355} | — | December 5, 2008 | Mount Lemmon | Mount Lemmon Survey | EOS | 1.8 km | MPC · JPL |
| 571818 | 2007 VC_{356} | — | November 4, 2007 | Kitt Peak | Spacewatch | · | 2.7 km | MPC · JPL |
| 571819 | 2007 VE_{356} | — | November 13, 2007 | Mount Lemmon | Mount Lemmon Survey | EOS | 1.3 km | MPC · JPL |
| 571820 | 2007 VM_{359} | — | June 12, 2015 | Mount Lemmon | Mount Lemmon Survey | · | 1.8 km | MPC · JPL |
| 571821 | 2007 VN_{359} | — | November 2, 2007 | Kitt Peak | Spacewatch | · | 1.7 km | MPC · JPL |
| 571822 | 2007 VW_{359} | — | November 9, 2007 | Kitt Peak | Spacewatch | · | 1.1 km | MPC · JPL |
| 571823 | 2007 VV_{360} | — | October 8, 2012 | Mount Lemmon | Mount Lemmon Survey | KOR | 1.1 km | MPC · JPL |
| 571824 | 2007 VF_{361} | — | November 8, 2007 | Kitt Peak | Spacewatch | · | 1.8 km | MPC · JPL |
| 571825 | 2007 VH_{361} | — | December 6, 2013 | Nogales | M. Schwartz, P. R. Holvorcem | · | 3.3 km | MPC · JPL |
| 571826 | 2007 VJ_{361} | — | November 4, 2007 | Kitt Peak | Spacewatch | EOS | 1.9 km | MPC · JPL |
| 571827 | 2007 VZ_{361} | — | April 12, 2013 | Haleakala | Pan-STARRS 1 | · | 920 m | MPC · JPL |
| 571828 | 2007 VX_{363} | — | November 3, 2007 | Mount Lemmon | Mount Lemmon Survey | · | 2.5 km | MPC · JPL |
| 571829 | 2007 VW_{364} | — | September 19, 2003 | Kitt Peak | Spacewatch | · | 790 m | MPC · JPL |
| 571830 | 2007 VM_{365} | — | November 3, 2007 | Kitt Peak | Spacewatch | · | 2.5 km | MPC · JPL |
| 571831 | 2007 VK_{366} | — | November 11, 2007 | Mount Lemmon | Mount Lemmon Survey | · | 1.6 km | MPC · JPL |
| 571832 | 2007 VQ_{373} | — | November 11, 2007 | Mount Lemmon | Mount Lemmon Survey | BRG | 1.0 km | MPC · JPL |
| 571833 | 2007 VJ_{374} | — | November 3, 2007 | Mount Lemmon | Mount Lemmon Survey | · | 3.1 km | MPC · JPL |
| 571834 | 2007 WE_{11} | — | November 9, 2007 | Catalina | CSS | EOS | 2.3 km | MPC · JPL |
| 571835 | 2007 WB_{12} | — | November 16, 2007 | Mount Lemmon | Mount Lemmon Survey | EOS | 1.6 km | MPC · JPL |
| 571836 | 2007 WM_{14} | — | November 18, 2007 | Mount Lemmon | Mount Lemmon Survey | MRX | 1.0 km | MPC · JPL |
| 571837 | 2007 WB_{21} | — | November 18, 2007 | Mount Lemmon | Mount Lemmon Survey | · | 3.2 km | MPC · JPL |
| 571838 | 2007 WB_{22} | — | December 4, 1996 | Kitt Peak | Spacewatch | PHO | 830 m | MPC · JPL |
| 571839 | 2007 WU_{26} | — | October 1, 2003 | Kitt Peak | Spacewatch | · | 1.2 km | MPC · JPL |
| 571840 | 2007 WU_{29} | — | November 19, 2007 | Kitt Peak | Spacewatch | · | 800 m | MPC · JPL |
| 571841 | 2007 WA_{32} | — | November 19, 2007 | Mount Lemmon | Mount Lemmon Survey | · | 1.2 km | MPC · JPL |
| 571842 | 2007 WL_{35} | — | November 8, 2007 | Kitt Peak | Spacewatch | · | 600 m | MPC · JPL |
| 571843 | 2007 WQ_{35} | — | November 19, 2007 | Mount Lemmon | Mount Lemmon Survey | · | 830 m | MPC · JPL |
| 571844 | 2007 WM_{44} | — | November 20, 2007 | Mount Lemmon | Mount Lemmon Survey | · | 2.5 km | MPC · JPL |
| 571845 | 2007 WK_{46} | — | November 20, 2007 | Mount Lemmon | Mount Lemmon Survey | · | 2.0 km | MPC · JPL |
| 571846 | 2007 WS_{48} | — | November 20, 2007 | Mount Lemmon | Mount Lemmon Survey | EOS | 1.6 km | MPC · JPL |
| 571847 | 2007 WE_{49} | — | November 4, 2007 | Kitt Peak | Spacewatch | KOR | 1.2 km | MPC · JPL |
| 571848 | 2007 WM_{55} | — | November 30, 2007 | Vallemare Borbona | V. S. Casulli | · | 2.1 km | MPC · JPL |
| 571849 | 2007 WX_{56} | — | November 18, 2007 | Kitt Peak | Spacewatch | · | 1.3 km | MPC · JPL |
| 571850 | 2007 WF_{57} | — | November 2, 2007 | Kitt Peak | Spacewatch | NAE | 2.7 km | MPC · JPL |
| 571851 | 2007 WW_{65} | — | January 31, 2009 | Kitt Peak | Spacewatch | · | 2.0 km | MPC · JPL |
| 571852 | 2007 WD_{66} | — | November 17, 2007 | Kitt Peak | Spacewatch | EOS | 1.9 km | MPC · JPL |
| 571853 | 2007 WJ_{66} | — | November 17, 2007 | Mount Lemmon | Mount Lemmon Survey | · | 2.3 km | MPC · JPL |
| 571854 | 2007 WC_{68} | — | September 13, 2014 | Haleakala | Pan-STARRS 1 | · | 1.1 km | MPC · JPL |
| 571855 | 2007 WV_{69} | — | July 4, 2016 | Haleakala | Pan-STARRS 1 | · | 1.6 km | MPC · JPL |
| 571856 | 2007 WD_{70} | — | April 23, 2015 | Haleakala | Pan-STARRS 1 | · | 1.9 km | MPC · JPL |
| 571857 | 2007 WZ_{70} | — | October 25, 2012 | Mount Lemmon | Mount Lemmon Survey | HYG | 2.3 km | MPC · JPL |
| 571858 | 2007 WE_{71} | — | November 17, 2007 | Kitt Peak | Spacewatch | KOR | 1.2 km | MPC · JPL |
| 571859 | 2007 WS_{71} | — | November 18, 2007 | Kitt Peak | Spacewatch | · | 1.1 km | MPC · JPL |
| 571860 | 2007 WJ_{73} | — | November 16, 2007 | Mount Lemmon | Mount Lemmon Survey | · | 1.8 km | MPC · JPL |
| 571861 | 2007 XD_{5} | — | December 4, 2007 | Kitt Peak | Spacewatch | · | 1.1 km | MPC · JPL |
| 571862 | 2007 XZ_{6} | — | May 23, 2006 | Mount Lemmon | Mount Lemmon Survey | · | 2.2 km | MPC · JPL |
| 571863 | 2007 XW_{17} | — | July 8, 2003 | Palomar | NEAT | ERI | 1.6 km | MPC · JPL |
| 571864 | 2007 XA_{27} | — | December 14, 2007 | Kitt Peak | Spacewatch | · | 2.2 km | MPC · JPL |
| 571865 | 2007 XT_{31} | — | November 17, 2007 | Mount Lemmon | Mount Lemmon Survey | · | 2.2 km | MPC · JPL |
| 571866 | 2007 XF_{35} | — | November 20, 2007 | Mount Lemmon | Mount Lemmon Survey | · | 950 m | MPC · JPL |
| 571867 | 2007 XD_{40} | — | December 13, 2007 | Socorro | LINEAR | PHO | 1.2 km | MPC · JPL |
| 571868 | 2007 XQ_{44} | — | December 15, 2007 | Kitt Peak | Spacewatch | · | 1.2 km | MPC · JPL |
| 571869 | 2007 XB_{46} | — | November 5, 2007 | Kitt Peak | Spacewatch | · | 3.7 km | MPC · JPL |
| 571870 | 2007 XD_{46} | — | December 15, 2007 | Catalina | CSS | · | 1.1 km | MPC · JPL |
| 571871 | 2007 XE_{49} | — | December 15, 2007 | Kitt Peak | Spacewatch | · | 2.3 km | MPC · JPL |
| 571872 | 2007 XG_{54} | — | December 4, 2007 | Kitt Peak | Spacewatch | · | 2.0 km | MPC · JPL |
| 571873 | 2007 XX_{59} | — | April 2, 2005 | Kitt Peak | Spacewatch | · | 1.1 km | MPC · JPL |
| 571874 | 2007 XK_{61} | — | December 6, 2007 | Kitt Peak | Spacewatch | NYS | 1.1 km | MPC · JPL |
| 571875 | 2007 XZ_{61} | — | December 6, 2007 | Charleston | R. Holmes | · | 1.2 km | MPC · JPL |
| 571876 | 2007 XB_{62} | — | December 4, 2007 | Kitt Peak | Spacewatch | · | 1.8 km | MPC · JPL |
| 571877 | 2007 XK_{62} | — | February 10, 2014 | Haleakala | Pan-STARRS 1 | · | 2.0 km | MPC · JPL |
| 571878 | 2007 XZ_{62} | — | October 10, 2015 | Haleakala | Pan-STARRS 1 | · | 1.6 km | MPC · JPL |
| 571879 | 2007 XB_{63} | — | June 12, 2015 | Haleakala | Pan-STARRS 1 | · | 1.6 km | MPC · JPL |
| 571880 | 2007 XQ_{64} | — | December 5, 2007 | Kitt Peak | Spacewatch | · | 2.4 km | MPC · JPL |
| 571881 | 2007 XX_{64} | — | August 28, 2017 | Bergisch Gladbach | W. Bickel | EOS | 1.9 km | MPC · JPL |
| 571882 | 2007 XF_{65} | — | December 4, 2007 | Kitt Peak | Spacewatch | · | 3.0 km | MPC · JPL |
| 571883 | 2007 XR_{65} | — | December 15, 2007 | Mount Lemmon | Mount Lemmon Survey | · | 2.5 km | MPC · JPL |
| 571884 | 2007 XF_{66} | — | August 31, 2017 | Mount Lemmon | Mount Lemmon Survey | · | 2.5 km | MPC · JPL |
| 571885 | 2007 XH_{69} | — | December 5, 2007 | Kitt Peak | Spacewatch | TEL | 1.1 km | MPC · JPL |
| 571886 | 2007 XJ_{69} | — | December 14, 2007 | Mount Lemmon | Mount Lemmon Survey | · | 2.3 km | MPC · JPL |
| 571887 | 2007 XN_{69} | — | December 4, 2007 | Mount Lemmon | Mount Lemmon Survey | · | 1.6 km | MPC · JPL |
| 571888 | 2007 YP | — | December 16, 2007 | Bergisch Gladbach | W. Bickel | · | 3.5 km | MPC · JPL |
| 571889 | 2007 YS | — | December 16, 2007 | Bergisch Gladbach | W. Bickel | · | 2.4 km | MPC · JPL |
| 571890 | 2007 YE_{3} | — | December 19, 2007 | Piszkéstető | K. Sárneczky | · | 1.5 km | MPC · JPL |
| 571891 | 2007 YF_{8} | — | December 16, 2007 | Mount Lemmon | Mount Lemmon Survey | EOS | 1.7 km | MPC · JPL |
| 571892 | 2007 YH_{8} | — | September 30, 2003 | Kitt Peak | Spacewatch | · | 1.1 km | MPC · JPL |
| 571893 | 2007 YO_{8} | — | December 16, 2007 | Mount Lemmon | Mount Lemmon Survey | · | 2.5 km | MPC · JPL |
| 571894 | 2007 YY_{11} | — | December 17, 2007 | Mount Lemmon | Mount Lemmon Survey | · | 1.6 km | MPC · JPL |
| 571895 | 2007 YF_{13} | — | December 17, 2007 | Mount Lemmon | Mount Lemmon Survey | EOS | 1.7 km | MPC · JPL |
| 571896 | 2007 YR_{16} | — | December 5, 2007 | Kitt Peak | Spacewatch | EOS | 1.6 km | MPC · JPL |
| 571897 | 2007 YQ_{21} | — | December 16, 2007 | Kitt Peak | Spacewatch | EOS | 1.5 km | MPC · JPL |
| 571898 | 2007 YA_{23} | — | December 16, 2007 | Mount Lemmon | Mount Lemmon Survey | · | 910 m | MPC · JPL |
| 571899 | 2007 YB_{23} | — | December 16, 2007 | Mount Lemmon | Mount Lemmon Survey | · | 3.3 km | MPC · JPL |
| 571900 | 2007 YC_{24} | — | August 29, 2006 | Kitt Peak | Spacewatch | · | 1.8 km | MPC · JPL |

== 571901–572000 ==
back to top

| Designation | | | Discovery | | | Properties | | Ref |
| Permanent | Provisional | Named after | Date | Site | Discoverer(s) | Category | Diam. | Ref |
|---|---|---|---|---|---|---|---|---|
| 571901 | 2007 YT_{32} | — | December 28, 2007 | Kitt Peak | Spacewatch | H | 410 m | MPC · JPL |
| 571902 | 2007 YV_{32} | — | December 28, 2007 | Kitt Peak | Spacewatch | · | 1.0 km | MPC · JPL |
| 571903 | 2007 YG_{37} | — | December 17, 2007 | Kitt Peak | Spacewatch | · | 2.4 km | MPC · JPL |
| 571904 | 2007 YH_{43} | — | August 28, 2006 | Anderson Mesa | LONEOS | · | 1.4 km | MPC · JPL |
| 571905 | 2007 YH_{52} | — | December 17, 2007 | Mount Lemmon | Mount Lemmon Survey | CLA | 1.2 km | MPC · JPL |
| 571906 | 2007 YJ_{57} | — | December 28, 2007 | Kitt Peak | Spacewatch | EOS | 1.6 km | MPC · JPL |
| 571907 | 2007 YW_{64} | — | December 30, 2007 | Mount Lemmon | Mount Lemmon Survey | · | 2.7 km | MPC · JPL |
| 571908 | 2007 YO_{68} | — | December 30, 2007 | Kitt Peak | Spacewatch | · | 2.4 km | MPC · JPL |
| 571909 | 2007 YK_{75} | — | September 28, 2006 | Kitt Peak | Spacewatch | T_{j} (2.98) · 3:2 | 5.2 km | MPC · JPL |
| 571910 | 2007 YZ_{76} | — | December 19, 2007 | Mount Lemmon | Mount Lemmon Survey | VER | 2.4 km | MPC · JPL |
| 571911 | 2007 YW_{77} | — | November 26, 2012 | Mount Lemmon | Mount Lemmon Survey | · | 2.0 km | MPC · JPL |
| 571912 | 2007 YF_{78} | — | December 31, 2007 | Kitt Peak | Spacewatch | EOS | 1.7 km | MPC · JPL |
| 571913 | 2007 YK_{78} | — | December 31, 2007 | Kitt Peak | Spacewatch | NYS | 970 m | MPC · JPL |
| 571914 | 2007 YZ_{78} | — | November 5, 2012 | Kitt Peak | Spacewatch | EOS | 1.6 km | MPC · JPL |
| 571915 | 2007 YK_{80} | — | December 30, 2007 | Kitt Peak | Spacewatch | AEG | 2.0 km | MPC · JPL |
| 571916 | 2007 YM_{80} | — | February 24, 2014 | Haleakala | Pan-STARRS 1 | · | 2.0 km | MPC · JPL |
| 571917 | 2007 YY_{82} | — | December 9, 2015 | Haleakala | Pan-STARRS 1 | · | 1.1 km | MPC · JPL |
| 571918 | 2007 YG_{83} | — | December 16, 2007 | Mount Lemmon | Mount Lemmon Survey | · | 1.9 km | MPC · JPL |
| 571919 | 2007 YM_{85} | — | December 31, 2013 | Haleakala | Pan-STARRS 1 | · | 2.5 km | MPC · JPL |
| 571920 | 2007 YX_{85} | — | March 29, 2017 | Haleakala | Pan-STARRS 1 | · | 1.1 km | MPC · JPL |
| 571921 | 2007 YV_{86} | — | November 13, 2007 | Mount Lemmon | Mount Lemmon Survey | TEL | 1.2 km | MPC · JPL |
| 571922 | 2007 YL_{87} | — | May 23, 2015 | Cerro Tololo-DECam | DECam | · | 2.0 km | MPC · JPL |
| 571923 | 2007 YO_{87} | — | March 18, 2009 | Kitt Peak | Spacewatch | · | 1.9 km | MPC · JPL |
| 571924 | 2007 YW_{87} | — | August 26, 2016 | Haleakala | Pan-STARRS 1 | EOS | 1.5 km | MPC · JPL |
| 571925 | 2007 YV_{88} | — | November 3, 2011 | Mount Lemmon | Mount Lemmon Survey | · | 870 m | MPC · JPL |
| 571926 | 2007 YW_{88} | — | December 18, 2007 | Mount Lemmon | Mount Lemmon Survey | EOS | 1.6 km | MPC · JPL |
| 571927 | 2007 YM_{89} | — | July 4, 2016 | Haleakala | Pan-STARRS 1 | · | 2.1 km | MPC · JPL |
| 571928 | 2007 YC_{90} | — | January 26, 2012 | Mount Lemmon | Mount Lemmon Survey | · | 940 m | MPC · JPL |
| 571929 | 2007 YJ_{90} | — | March 23, 2003 | Apache Point | SDSS Collaboration | · | 2.2 km | MPC · JPL |
| 571930 | 2007 YV_{90} | — | December 18, 2007 | Kitt Peak | Spacewatch | · | 2.7 km | MPC · JPL |
| 571931 | 2007 YW_{90} | — | December 19, 2007 | Mount Lemmon | Mount Lemmon Survey | · | 2.8 km | MPC · JPL |
| 571932 | 2007 YD_{91} | — | December 30, 2007 | Kitt Peak | Spacewatch | · | 2.3 km | MPC · JPL |
| 571933 | 2007 YH_{91} | — | December 16, 2007 | Mount Lemmon | Mount Lemmon Survey | · | 2.7 km | MPC · JPL |
| 571934 | 2007 YR_{91} | — | December 17, 2007 | Kitt Peak | Spacewatch | · | 2.4 km | MPC · JPL |
| 571935 | 2007 YY_{91} | — | December 17, 2007 | Kitt Peak | Spacewatch | EOS | 1.7 km | MPC · JPL |
| 571936 | 2007 YF_{95} | — | December 31, 2007 | Kitt Peak | Spacewatch | · | 1.4 km | MPC · JPL |
| 571937 | 2008 AA | — | January 1, 2008 | Costitx | OAM | · | 3.0 km | MPC · JPL |
| 571938 Mariaeimmart | 2008 AG_{2} | Mariaeimmart | January 6, 2008 | Zelenchukskaya Stn | Zelenchukskaya Stn | · | 2.4 km | MPC · JPL |
| 571939 | 2008 AE_{8} | — | January 10, 2008 | Kitt Peak | Spacewatch | · | 2.5 km | MPC · JPL |
| 571940 | 2008 AG_{12} | — | January 10, 2008 | Mount Lemmon | Mount Lemmon Survey | · | 700 m | MPC · JPL |
| 571941 | 2008 AR_{14} | — | December 30, 2007 | Mount Lemmon | Mount Lemmon Survey | · | 1.3 km | MPC · JPL |
| 571942 | 2008 AM_{16} | — | January 10, 2008 | Mount Lemmon | Mount Lemmon Survey | LIX | 2.9 km | MPC · JPL |
| 571943 | 2008 AN_{16} | — | July 29, 2000 | Cerro Tololo | Deep Ecliptic Survey | · | 2.7 km | MPC · JPL |
| 571944 | 2008 AO_{16} | — | January 10, 2008 | Mount Lemmon | Mount Lemmon Survey | EOS | 1.7 km | MPC · JPL |
| 571945 | 2008 AG_{23} | — | March 23, 2003 | Apache Point | SDSS Collaboration | · | 1.8 km | MPC · JPL |
| 571946 | 2008 AR_{23} | — | January 10, 2008 | Mount Lemmon | Mount Lemmon Survey | · | 2.9 km | MPC · JPL |
| 571947 | 2008 AZ_{40} | — | January 10, 2008 | Mount Lemmon | Mount Lemmon Survey | EOS | 2.5 km | MPC · JPL |
| 571948 | 2008 AR_{45} | — | November 19, 2007 | Kitt Peak | Spacewatch | EOS | 1.8 km | MPC · JPL |
| 571949 | 2008 AK_{47} | — | December 16, 2007 | Kitt Peak | Spacewatch | · | 1.4 km | MPC · JPL |
| 571950 | 2008 AJ_{49} | — | December 31, 2007 | Kitt Peak | Spacewatch | · | 2.4 km | MPC · JPL |
| 571951 | 2008 AF_{50} | — | January 1, 2008 | Kitt Peak | Spacewatch | · | 2.6 km | MPC · JPL |
| 571952 | 2008 AY_{50} | — | September 16, 2006 | Anderson Mesa | LONEOS | · | 2.1 km | MPC · JPL |
| 571953 | 2008 AF_{52} | — | November 20, 2003 | Needville | Garossino, P., Wells, D. | NYS | 1.2 km | MPC · JPL |
| 571954 | 2008 AB_{56} | — | January 11, 2008 | Kitt Peak | Spacewatch | VER | 2.4 km | MPC · JPL |
| 571955 | 2008 AR_{57} | — | March 24, 2003 | Kitt Peak | Spacewatch | · | 2.6 km | MPC · JPL |
| 571956 | 2008 AN_{66} | — | January 11, 2008 | Kitt Peak | Spacewatch | · | 1.9 km | MPC · JPL |
| 571957 Jacekwierzchoś | 2008 AS_{67} | Jacekwierzchoś | December 30, 2007 | Mount Lemmon | Mount Lemmon Survey | TIR | 2.9 km | MPC · JPL |
| 571958 | 2008 AK_{71} | — | November 20, 2007 | Kitt Peak | Spacewatch | · | 950 m | MPC · JPL |
| 571959 | 2008 AZ_{73} | — | January 10, 2008 | Kitt Peak | Spacewatch | · | 1.8 km | MPC · JPL |
| 571960 | 2008 AS_{74} | — | December 31, 2007 | Kitt Peak | Spacewatch | · | 2.7 km | MPC · JPL |
| 571961 | 2008 AW_{76} | — | December 14, 2007 | Mount Lemmon | Mount Lemmon Survey | · | 2.1 km | MPC · JPL |
| 571962 | 2008 AS_{81} | — | November 11, 2001 | Apache Point | SDSS | · | 2.0 km | MPC · JPL |
| 571963 | 2008 AE_{83} | — | November 4, 2007 | Mount Lemmon | Mount Lemmon Survey | · | 2.0 km | MPC · JPL |
| 571964 | 2008 AR_{83} | — | December 18, 2007 | Kitt Peak | Spacewatch | · | 2.4 km | MPC · JPL |
| 571965 | 2008 AK_{84} | — | January 15, 2008 | Kitt Peak | Spacewatch | · | 890 m | MPC · JPL |
| 571966 | 2008 AG_{87} | — | December 20, 2007 | Kitt Peak | Spacewatch | · | 1.9 km | MPC · JPL |
| 571967 | 2008 AS_{87} | — | January 13, 2008 | Kitt Peak | Spacewatch | · | 2.4 km | MPC · JPL |
| 571968 | 2008 AN_{89} | — | December 30, 2007 | Kitt Peak | Spacewatch | · | 2.9 km | MPC · JPL |
| 571969 | 2008 AZ_{89} | — | January 13, 2008 | Kitt Peak | Spacewatch | EOS | 1.4 km | MPC · JPL |
| 571970 | 2008 AC_{90} | — | December 30, 2007 | Kitt Peak | Spacewatch | · | 2.1 km | MPC · JPL |
| 571971 | 2008 AC_{91} | — | December 14, 2007 | Mount Lemmon | Mount Lemmon Survey | EUP | 3.1 km | MPC · JPL |
| 571972 | 2008 AG_{92} | — | January 14, 2008 | Kitt Peak | Spacewatch | · | 3.0 km | MPC · JPL |
| 571973 | 2008 AH_{95} | — | January 14, 2008 | Kitt Peak | Spacewatch | · | 1.9 km | MPC · JPL |
| 571974 | 2008 AW_{96} | — | January 14, 2008 | Kitt Peak | Spacewatch | EOS | 1.8 km | MPC · JPL |
| 571975 | 2008 AT_{100} | — | January 14, 2008 | Kitt Peak | Spacewatch | EOS | 1.8 km | MPC · JPL |
| 571976 | 2008 AF_{117} | — | January 10, 2008 | Kitt Peak | Spacewatch | · | 1.9 km | MPC · JPL |
| 571977 | 2008 AM_{126} | — | January 6, 2008 | Mauna Kea | P. A. Wiegert | · | 1.6 km | MPC · JPL |
| 571978 | 2008 AL_{128} | — | January 12, 2008 | Mount Lemmon | Mount Lemmon Survey | · | 1.9 km | MPC · JPL |
| 571979 | 2008 AK_{131} | — | July 6, 2005 | Kitt Peak | Spacewatch | · | 1.6 km | MPC · JPL |
| 571980 | 2008 AX_{136} | — | January 13, 2008 | Kitt Peak | Spacewatch | · | 3.4 km | MPC · JPL |
| 571981 | 2008 AO_{139} | — | January 11, 2008 | Mount Lemmon | Mount Lemmon Survey | V | 610 m | MPC · JPL |
| 571982 | 2008 AU_{139} | — | December 30, 2007 | Kitt Peak | Spacewatch | · | 1.3 km | MPC · JPL |
| 571983 | 2008 AN_{140} | — | March 17, 2012 | Mount Lemmon | Mount Lemmon Survey | · | 620 m | MPC · JPL |
| 571984 | 2008 AR_{140} | — | October 6, 2012 | Kitt Peak | Spacewatch | · | 1.6 km | MPC · JPL |
| 571985 | 2008 AW_{140} | — | July 28, 2011 | Haleakala | Pan-STARRS 1 | · | 2.7 km | MPC · JPL |
| 571986 | 2008 AY_{140} | — | March 26, 2009 | Kitt Peak | Spacewatch | · | 2.0 km | MPC · JPL |
| 571987 | 2008 AB_{141} | — | January 11, 2008 | Kitt Peak | Spacewatch | · | 1.2 km | MPC · JPL |
| 571988 | 2008 AJ_{141} | — | January 13, 2008 | Mount Lemmon | Mount Lemmon Survey | · | 2.4 km | MPC · JPL |
| 571989 | 2008 AH_{142} | — | August 28, 2016 | Mount Lemmon | Mount Lemmon Survey | EOS | 1.3 km | MPC · JPL |
| 571990 | 2008 AU_{142} | — | May 14, 2015 | Haleakala | Pan-STARRS 1 | · | 1.8 km | MPC · JPL |
| 571991 | 2008 AH_{143} | — | August 2, 2011 | Haleakala | Pan-STARRS 1 | · | 3.1 km | MPC · JPL |
| 571992 | 2008 AW_{143} | — | January 30, 2009 | Mount Lemmon | Mount Lemmon Survey | EOS | 1.9 km | MPC · JPL |
| 571993 | 2008 AC_{144} | — | December 16, 2007 | Mount Lemmon | Mount Lemmon Survey | · | 1.9 km | MPC · JPL |
| 571994 | 2008 AM_{144} | — | January 11, 2008 | Mount Lemmon | Mount Lemmon Survey | · | 2.9 km | MPC · JPL |
| 571995 | 2008 AX_{144} | — | April 20, 2014 | Mount Lemmon | Mount Lemmon Survey | · | 1.6 km | MPC · JPL |
| 571996 | 2008 AJ_{145} | — | January 13, 2008 | Mount Lemmon | Mount Lemmon Survey | EOS | 1.4 km | MPC · JPL |
| 571997 | 2008 AX_{145} | — | December 18, 2007 | Mount Lemmon | Mount Lemmon Survey | · | 2.1 km | MPC · JPL |
| 571998 | 2008 AM_{146} | — | January 14, 2008 | Kitt Peak | Spacewatch | EOS | 1.9 km | MPC · JPL |
| 571999 | 2008 AF_{147} | — | November 12, 2012 | Haleakala | Pan-STARRS 1 | · | 1.7 km | MPC · JPL |
| 572000 | 2008 AY_{147} | — | November 18, 2017 | Haleakala | Pan-STARRS 1 | EOS | 1.4 km | MPC · JPL |

back to top

== Meaning of names ==
As minor planet discoveries are confirmed, they are given a permanent number by the IAU's Minor Planet Center (MPC), and the discoverers can then submit names for them, following the IAU's naming conventions. The list below concerns those minor planets in the specified number-range that have received names, and explains the meanings of those names.

Official naming citations of newly named small Solar System bodies are approved and published in a bulletin by IAU's Working Group for Small Bodies Nomenclature (WGSBN). Before May 2021, citations were published in MPC's Minor Planet Circulars for many decades. Recent citations can also be found on the JPL Small-Body Database (SBDB). Until his death in 2016, German astronomer Lutz D. Schmadel compiled these citations into the Dictionary of Minor Planet Names (DMP) and regularly updated the collection.

Based on Paul Herget's The Names of the Minor Planets, Schmadel also researched the unclear origin of numerous asteroids, most of which had been named prior to World War II. This article incorporates text from this source, which is in the public domain: SBDB New namings may only be added to this list below after official publication as the preannouncement of names is condemned. The WGSBN publishes a comprehensive guideline for the naming rules of non-cometary small Solar System bodies.

| Named minor planet | Provisional | This minor planet was named for... | Ref · Catalog |
|---|---|---|---|
| 571117 Mikehudson | 2007 CH_{61} | Mike Hudson, Canadian Professor of Astrophysics and Cosmology at the Waterloo Centre for Astrophysics of the University of Waterloo in Ontario, Canada. | IAU · 571117 |
| 571398 Jasonrowe | 2007 LP_{30} | Jason Rowe, Canadian Assistant Professor at Bishop's University and the Canada Research Chair in Exoplanet Astrophysics. | IAU · 571398 |
| 571535 Okunoto | 2007 TO_{15} | Okunoto, located on Japan's Noto Peninsula, is a tourist destination known for spectacular scenery due to the Sea of Japan and the Hatago Iwa rocks. | IAU · 571535 |
| 571938 Mariaeimmart | 2008 AG_{2} | Maria Clara Eimmart (Eimmartin) (1676–1707), a German astronomer and painter. | IAU · 571938 |
