= Kitsune no yomeiri =

Japanese folk tale based on atmospheric lights

The kitsune no yomeiri (狐の嫁入り; "the fox's wedding") is a term or metaphor for certain natural phenomena, or a folk belief regarding a supernatural event, in Honshu, Shikoku, and Kyushu. The term "kitsune no yomeiri" can refer to several things: atmospheric ghost lights, in which it appears as if paper lanterns from a wedding procession are floating through the dark; sunshowers; or various other phenomena that may resemble wedding processions and are referenced in classical Japanese kaidan, essays, and legends. The kitsune no yomeiri is always closely related to foxes, or kitsune, who often play tricks on humans in Japanese legend; various Shinto rituals and festive rites relating to the kitsune no yomeiri have been developed in various parts of Japan.

== As atmospheric ghost lights ==
A topography book of the Echigo Province (now Niigata Prefecture), from the Hōreki period, the "Echigo Nayose" (越後名寄), includes the following statement about the appearance of the "kitsune no yomeiri":

At whatever time at night, whatever place, on occasions when it becomes extraordinarily quiet, flames like paper lanterns or torches can be seen usually continuing far into the distance, far surpassing even one ri. They are quite rare in all places, but they appear occasionally in the Kanbara district. This is what the young call "the wedding of foxes". (Yoru itsu izuko tomo iu koto naku, wori shizuka naru yoru ni, chōchin arui ha taimatsu no gotoku naru hi, oyoso ichiri-yo mo manaku tsuzukite wochikata ni miyuru koto ari. Migi, izure no tokoro nite mo mare ni ari to ihedomo, Kanbara-gun chū ni ha worifushi kore ari. Kore wo jidō-bara "kitsune no kon" to ihinarahaseri.) (Note: 日野 1926, p. 76より引用。)

In here, lines of atmospheric ghost lights that stretch close to 4 kilometers are called "kitsune no kon", and also in Nakakubiki District, Niigata Prefecture, and Uonuma of the same prefecture, the Akita Prefecture, Sakuragawa, Ibaraki Prefecture, Nanakai, Nishiibaraki District of the same prefecture (now Shirosato), Hitachiōta of the same prefecture, Koshigaya, Saitama Prefecture, Higashichichibu of the same prefecture, the Tama area of Tokyo, the Gunma Prefecture, the Tochigi Prefecture, Mukawa, Hokuto, Yamanashi Prefecture, the Mie Prefecture, Kashihara, Nara Prefecture, and Nanbu, Saihaku District, Tottori Prefecture, among other places, when atmospheric ghost lights (kitsunebi) are seen in the countryside at night, it is called "kitsune no yomeiri."

What it is called varies depending on area; for example, the phenomenon is called "kitsune no yometori (狐の嫁取り, the fox's wife-taking)" in Sōka, Saitama Prefecture and Noto, Fugeshi District, Ishikawa Prefecture (now Noto, Hōsu District) while referred to as "kitsune no shūgen" (狐の祝言) in Numazu, Shizuoka Prefecture.

In Japan, holding a wedding in a specific place did not become common until the middle of the Showa period. Prior to this, it was common for weddings to be performed in the evening and for the bride to enter with a procession of paper lanterns. Since atmospheric ghost lights that extend in a line can look like lanterns and torches from a wedding ceremony, and since paper lanterns were known to be used during a fox's wedding ceremony, they were thus called such names. There are several theories as to why the bride and groom are seen as foxes. One such theory says that although the lights appeared to be signifying a wedding, there was actually no wedding anywhere and the entire thing was an elaborate trick played by foxes. Because the mysterious lights looked like paper lanterns from afar but disappeared once one got close, it was almost as if one was being fooled by a fox.

In the past, in Toyoshima in Edo (now Toshima, Kita ward, Tokyo, and Ouji, of the same ward), for atmospheric ghost lights to continuously appear and quiver and shake around in the darkness is called "kitsune no yomeiri," and is counted as one of the "seven mysteries of Toshima" told about in this village.

In Kirinzan, Niigata Prefecture, there lived many foxes, and it is said that there was a wedding procession at night that hanged paper lanterns. In Niigata as well as Shiki District, Nara Prefecture, a fox's wedding is thought to be connected to agriculture, and it is said that for many atmospheric ghost lights to appear means that it is a plentiful year, and for few of them to appear means it is year of poor crops.

Depending on the area, there are legends including not only the sighting of atmospheric ghost lights but purported sightings of actual weddings as well. In Gyōda, Saitama Prefecture, it is said that kitsune no yomeiri frequently appears in the Kasuga Shrine in Tanigou, and it is reported that here and there along the road, fox feces can be found after one such reported event. In Horado, Mugi District, Gifu Prefecture (now Seki), it is said that it was not merely atmospheric ghost lights that were seen, but the sound of bamboo burning and tearing was also heard continuing for several days, but that there were no traces found even when an attempt was made to check what it was.

In the Tokushima Prefecture, they were not considered fox's weddings, but rather fox's funerals, and were an omen that someone was about to die.

Concerning the true identity of these atmospheric ghost lights, it is thought that perhaps people mistook it for lights that were actually there, or possibly the illusion from an unusual refraction of light.

Kitsune no yomeiri

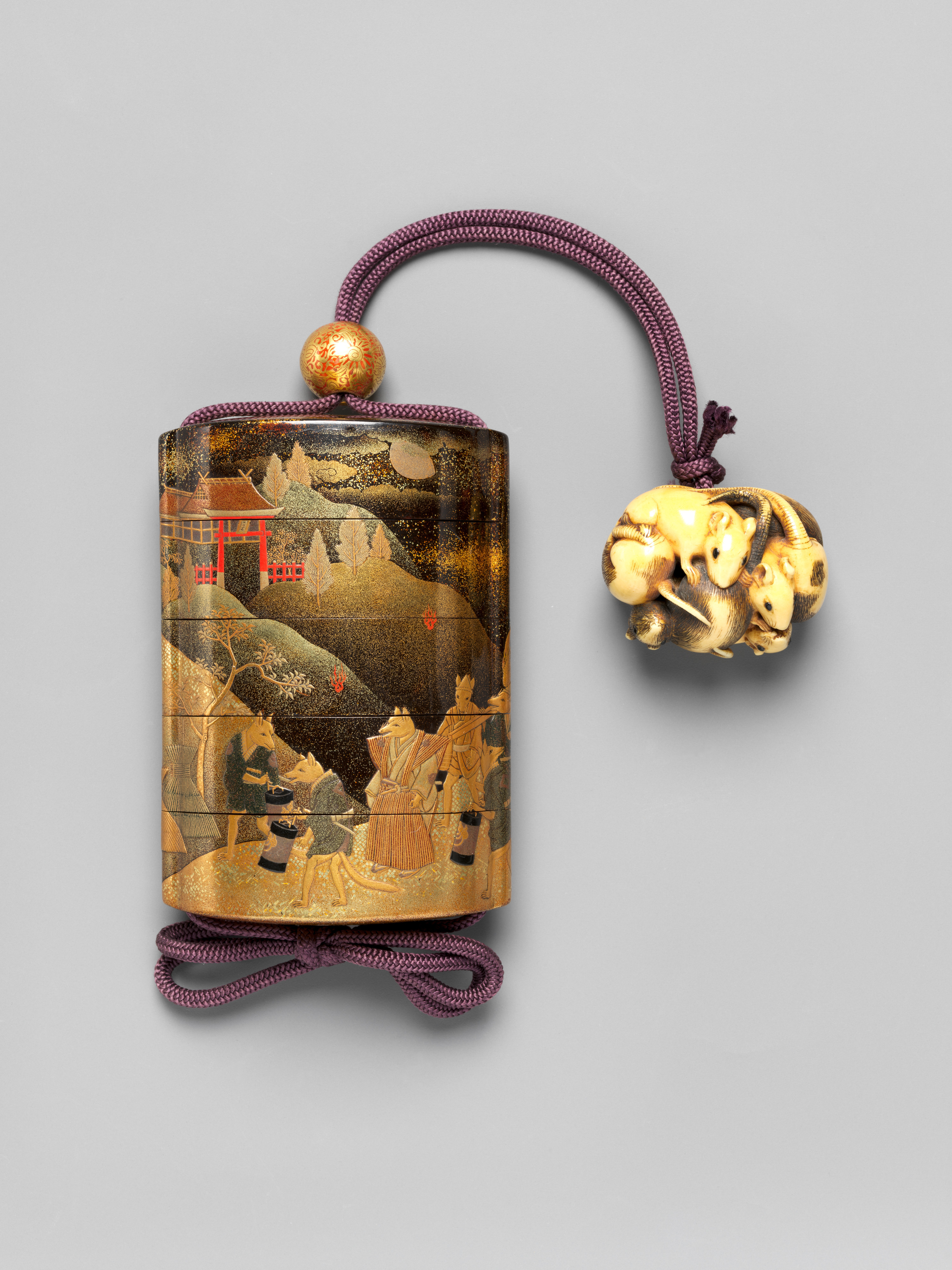
Inro depicting the kitsune no yomeiri.

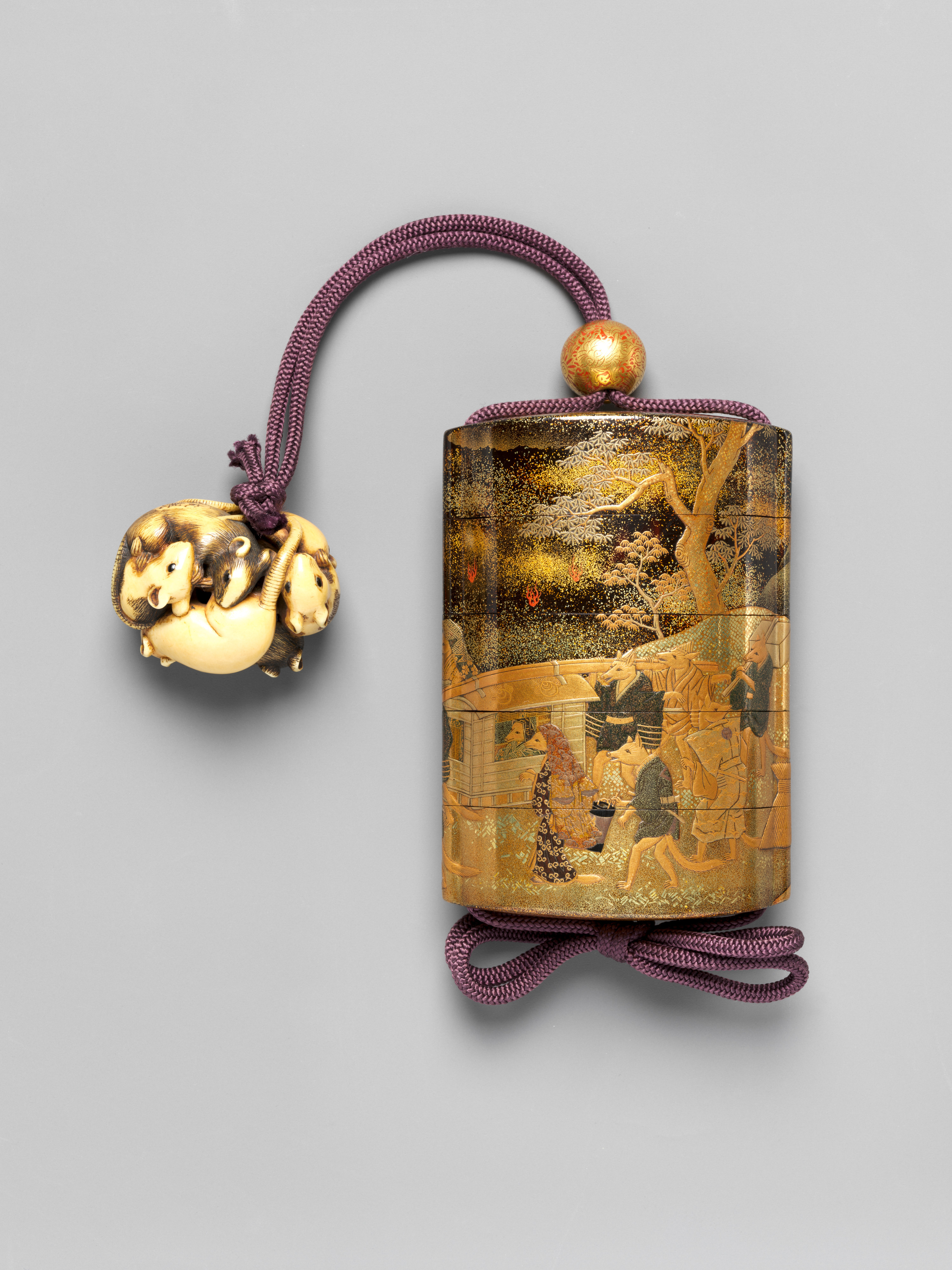
The reverse side depicting the bride in a litter.

== Legend related to the weather ==
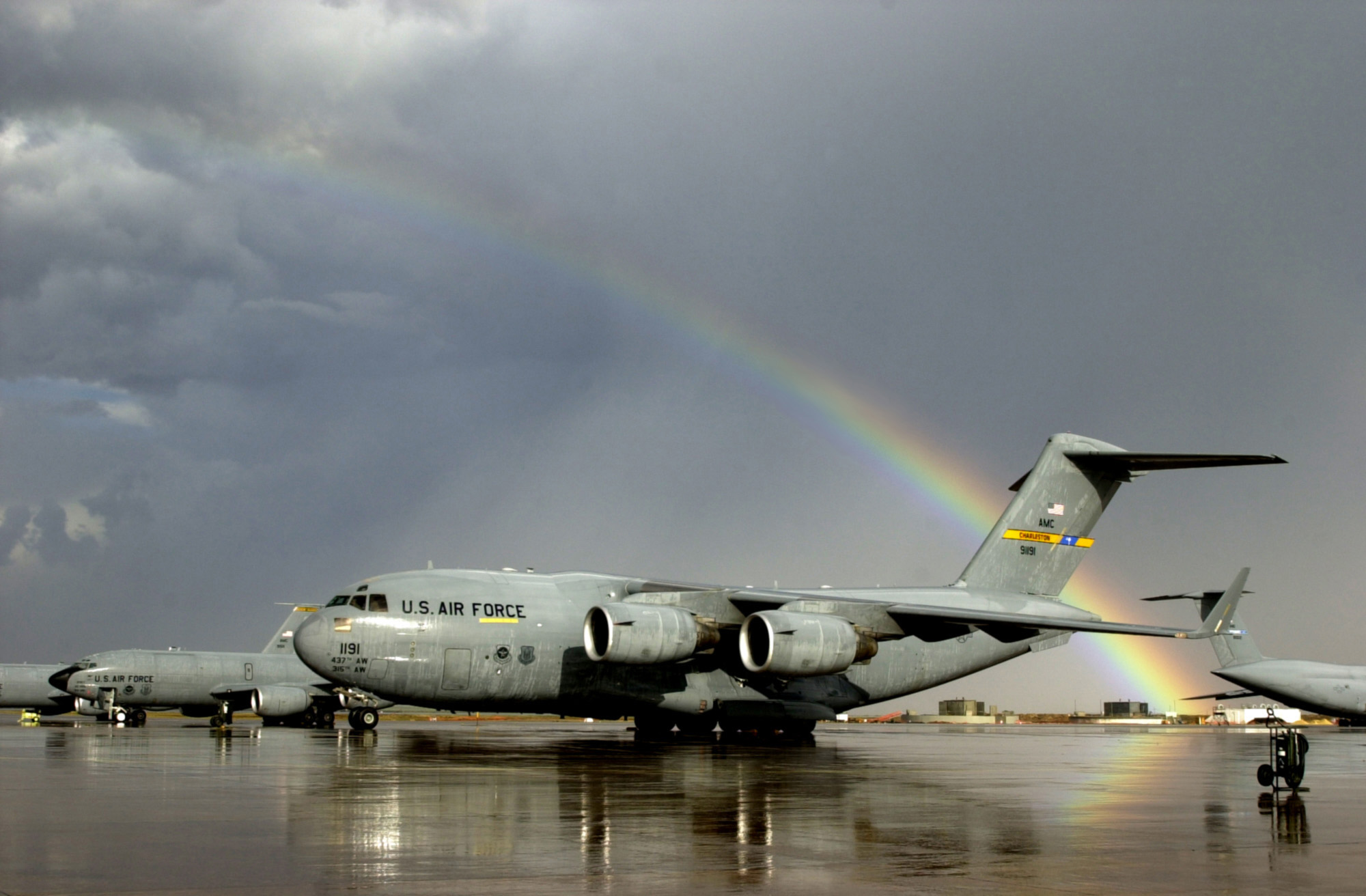
Situation immediately after a sunshower

In the Kantō region, Chūbu region, Kansai region, Chūgoku region, Shikoku, Kyushu, among other places, sunshowers are called "kitsune no yomeiri."

Like atmospheric ghost lights, this phenomenon is called various names depending on area. In the Nanbu Region, Aomori Prefecture, it is called "kitsune no yometori" (狐の嫁取り, the fox's wife-taking), and in Serizawa, Chigasaki, Kanagawa Prefecture and the mountainous areas of Oe District, Tokushima Prefecture, it is called "kitsune-ame" (狐雨, fox rain). In the eastern Isumi District, Chiba Prefecture, it is called "kitsune no shūgen" (狐の祝言). In the Higashi-Katsushika District, Chiba Prefecture, it is referred to as "kitsune no yometori ame" (狐の嫁取り雨, the fox's wife-taking rain) like in Aomori, but this stems from the fact that this area was once a farming area, and seeing as how wives were noted for their labor, wives were thought as ones who existed to be "taken" for the sake of the prosperity of the family.

There are various reasons for sunshowers to be related to "foxes," "wives," and "weddings." One such explanation is that it can be said that when it rains even when the sky is clear people may feel like they have been tricked into seeing a somewhat impossible situation. In addition, there is also the explanation that some people simply believed that a fox's wedding would take place during a sunshower. Another explanation is that since mountain bases experienced a lot of rain even when the sky was clear, people thought that foxes made rain fall in order to prevent people from going up the mountain and seeing the fox's wedding. Another explanation is that since some wives cry (rain) even on a happy (sunny) day, they called forth such strange weather as a sunshower. Finally, there is the explanation that the words used to describe the strangeness of the atmospheric ghost lights written about above were also to describe the strangeness of sunshine when rain was falling.

The relation between a fox's wedding and the weather also differs by area, and in the Kumamoto Prefecture, it is when a rainbow appears, and in the Aichi Prefecture, it is when graupel falls that there is a fox's wedding.

== Classics and legends ==
Fox's weddings were not merely phenomena of nature, but also things that were actually seen in the old literature of the Edo period as well as various legends depending on the area.

There are various stories of strange wedding processions that were witnessed, and where there were actually foxes, like in the essay "Konjaku Yōdan Shū" (今昔妖談集) of Kan'ei period of one taking place in Takemachi, in the Honjo area of Edo, as well as the written work "Edo Chirihiroi" (江戸塵拾) where one was seen at the Hacchō canal in Edo, as well as the kaidan collection "Kaidan Oi no Tsue" (怪談老の杖) of the Kansei period where one was seen in the village of Kanda, Kōzuke (now Gunma Prefecture).

Stories of marriages between foxes that were shown to humans are disseminated country-wide. As an example, according to folk legend, in a legend of Sōka, Saitama prefecture, in the Sengoku period, a certain woman promised to marry with her lover, but died to an illness, and foxes were inspired by the regretfulness of this situation, and thus it is said that a fox's wedding procession could be seen near the woman's grave. Also, according to a folktale in the Shinano Province (now Nagano Prefecture), there is a story where when an old man helped a little fox, he was eventually greeted by the wedding procession of the fox when it grew mature, and as a gift of thanks to the old man, he was taken along it. In stories of weddings like these, natural phenomena like those written about above as well as supernatural "kitsune no yomeiri", function like stage settings, and weddings that take place in the day frequently take place in a sunshower, and those that take place at night frequently take place among atmospheric ghost lights.

There are also legends in various areas that one could see a fox's wedding by performing some specific actions, and in the Fukushima Prefecture, it is said that at evening in 10/10 on the lunisolar calendar, if one wears a suribachi on one's head, and sticks a wooden pestle in one's waist, and stand under a date plum, it is possible to see a fox's wedding, and in the Aichi Prefecture, it is said that if one spits in a well, intertwine one's fingers and look through a gap in between, one is able to see a fox's wedding.

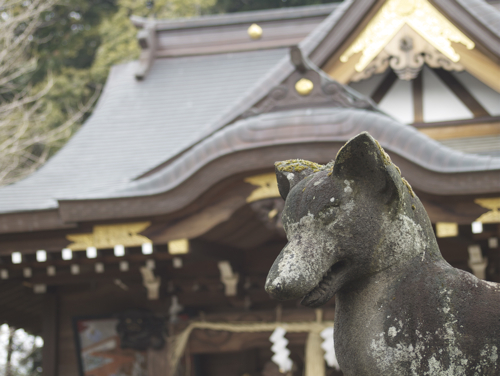
The Onabake Jinja in Ryūgasaki, Ibaraki Prefecture

There are also stories of weddings not just between foxes, but also between a human male and a female fox, and as a representative work, which also became a ningyō jōruri, there is the story about the birth of the Heian period onmyoji, Abe no Seimei in Kuzunoha. Other than this, there is also a similar tale in the Nihonkoku Genpō Zen'aku Ryōiki, as well as in the "Tonegawa Zushi" (利根川図志) a topography book published in 1857 (Ansei 5). The latter one concerns a commander 栗林義長 who actually existed who was comparable with Zhuge Liang, and the town of Onabake (女化, literally "shapeshift into woman") in Ushiku, Ibaraki Prefecture got its name from this, and the a fox is deified in the Onabake Jinja in Ryūgasaki of the same prefecture.

Also, in the Konjaku Monogatarishū as well as the "Honchō Koji Innen Shū" (本朝故事因縁集) published in 1689 (Genroku 2) and the "Tamahahaki" (玉掃木) published in 1696 (Genroku 9), there is the story of a fox who appeared before a married man, shapeshifted and disguised as that person's wife. Also, in the kaidan collection "Tonoigusa" (宿直草) published in 1677 (Enpō 5), there is the reverse story where a male fox fell in love with a female human, shapeshifted and disguised as that woman's husband and intercourse, and resulted in the birth of children with atypical appearance.

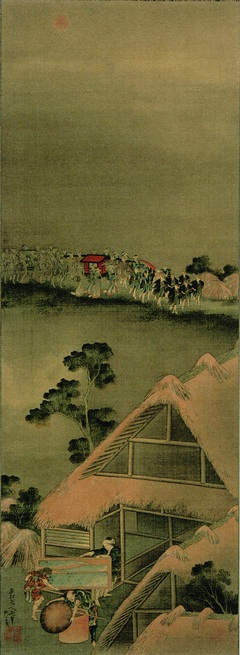
"Kitsune no Yomeiri-zu" by Hokusai Katsushika

== Related works ==
The "Kitsune no Yomeiri-zu" from the Edo period by the ukiyo-e artist Hokusai Katsushika was based upon this folk belief, and it depicted various people surprised by a fox's wedding procession and a sudden shower, and their bustle to take in their crop (refer to image). This has been pointed out to be an unusual example where the imaginary background of the foxes and the real customs of farming villages are depicted at the same time in a painting.

In a poem of Kobayashi Issa, a haiku poet of the same era, there is one that read, "in the autumn flames and mountains, there is the rain of fox's weddings" (秋の火や山は狐の嫁入雨). Also, in the works of the Meiji period waka and haiku poet Kobayashi Issa, there was a tanka that read, "when the rain falls on the village from a blue sky at the hour of the horse, perhaps the king fox is getting married" (青空にむら雨すぐる馬時狐の大王妻めすらんか). (Note: 柴田 1963, p. 91より引用。)

In the ningyō jōruri "Dan no Ura Kabuto Gunki" (壇浦兜軍記) first performed in 1732, there was also "it was quite clear weather all the way up to now, but then I heard it, the playful rain of the fox's wedding" and in the period novel Onihei Hankachō published after the war, there was one volume titled "fox rain" (狐雨).

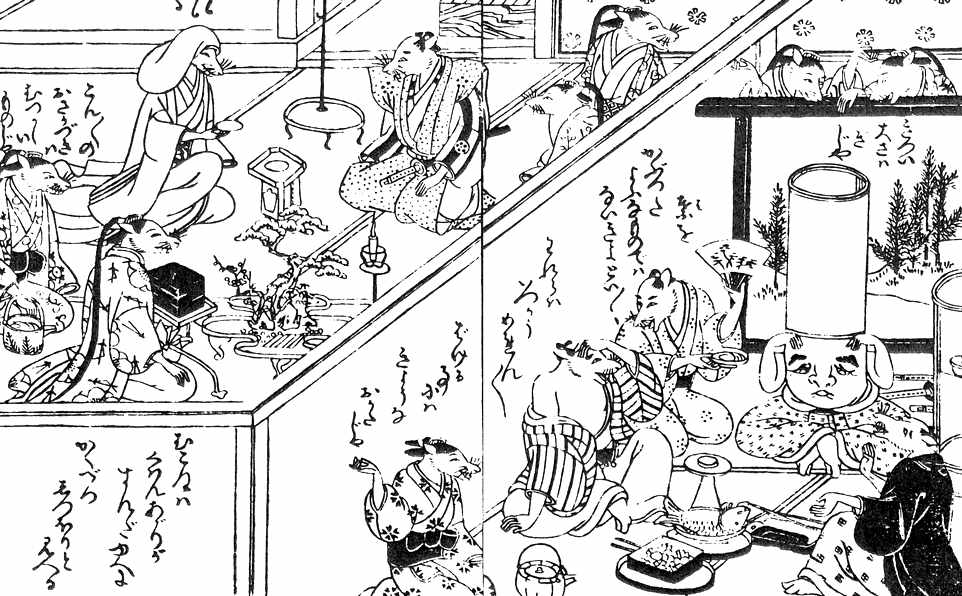
Shūgen Kitsune no Mukoiri. It is determined to be a recent era work, but its time of creation and its creator is unknown.

Other than that, in Edo period kusazōshi and kibyōshi such as the Naimono Kuō Kitsune no Mukoiri (無物喰狐婿入) (illustrated by Kitao Masayoshi) published in 1785 (Tenmei 5), "Mukashigatari Kitsune Yomeiri" (昔語狐娶入) (illustrated by Kitao Shigemasa), and "Anasaka Kitsune Engumi" (穴賢狐縁組) (illustrated by Jippensha Ikku), as well as in Kamigata e-hon such as the "Shūgen Kitsune no Mukoiri" and "Ehon Atsumegusa", there are depictions of "foxes' weddings" of humanized foxes going through weddings. There was a genre of works called "yomeiri mono" (嫁入り物; "wedding things") of humanized animals going through weddings, but foxes had the special characteristic of concretely having the name Inari no Kami attached to them. This is seen to be an indication that faith in the god Inari as well as "yomeiri mono" both deeply permeated among the common people.

Among common people, in Akaoka, Kōchi Prefecture (now Kōnan) among other places, there is the children's song "when rain falls in good weather, it's the fox's wedding" (日和に雨が降りゃ 狐の嫁入り (hiyori ni ame ga furya, kitsune no yomeiri)), (Note: 近松他 1980, p. 551より引用。) (Note: 近森 1974, p. 37より引用。) and it is said that an actual fox's wedding precession was seen on a day of a sunshower.

Akira Kurosawa showed the Kitsune no yomeiri in his film Dreams (1990), where "Sunshine Through The Rain" is the first scene.

Japanese music producer -MASA Works DESIGN- the song "The Fox's Wedding"/"狐の嫁入り", featuring the voicebanks of Vocaloid's Hatsune Miku and GUMI. The song is part of a series called "The Story of the Kitsune and the Demon"/"狐と鬼の話" (also referred to as the Onibi series) which tell the stories of two families and the curse placed on the daughter of one family after the Kitsune, the daughter of the other family, was kidnapped, tortured and murdered by the mother of the former's family.

== Related events ==
Due to the fox's wedding precession in Kirinzan in the Niigata Prefecture written about previously, the Kitsune no Yomeiri Gyōretsu is performed in the Tsugawa region, Aga, Higashikanbara in the same prefecture. Originally a place famous for kitsunebi, an event related to kitsunebi was performed starting from Shōwa 27, and it ceased once, in 1990 the sightseeing event with the wedding precession (yomeiri gyōretsu) as its core was revived, and every year, it flourishes with about 40 thousand sightseers.

Also in the Hanaoka Tokufuku Inari-sha in Kudamatsu, Yamaguchi Prefecture, in the Inari festival held in November 3 every year, the "kitsune no yomeiri" is performed. This is not related to either atmospheric ghost lights or sunshowers, but is rather a re-enactment of a wedding between foxes, and is due to the efforts of volunteers after the old practice of praying for good harvest at the Inari festival at that shrine ceased in the chaos of the postwar period, and the re-enactment refers to the fact a white fox couple at that shrine was looking for something lost, and was deified as a god of good harvest and thriving business. The ones who perform as the fox couple are selected among the people of Kudamatsu, but it is said that as the female who plays the part of one of the newlywed is going to be blessed with a good match, there is a benefit to a marriage at that same shrine.

Also, in the Suzakihamamiyashinemei Jinja in Miyado, Yokkaichi, Mie Prefecture, during setsubun, a shinto ritual called "kitsune no yomeiri dōchū (the fox's wedding journey)" is performed. This was also a ritual performed in the Edo period, but this was also a practice revived in the postwar period, and a man and woman who were in a yakudoshi or "unlucky age" that year would dress up as a little fox, the head envoy of the gods, and a girl fox, the envoy of the god of Suzakihamamiyashinemei Jinja, and then re-enact a wedding, which at that time it can be seen to flourish with several tens of thousands of visitors to the shrine.

== Sources ==
- 大沢俊吉 (1981). Gyōda no densetsu to shiwa 行田の伝説と史話 [Legends and historical tales of Gyoda]. 国書刊行会.
- 岡崎柾男 (1998). Edo no yami/makai meguri – Onryō sutā to kaii densetsu 江戸の闇・魔界めぐり 怨霊スターと怪異伝説 [A tour of Edo's clandestine demon world – Onryo Star & Mysterious Legend]. 東京美術. ISBN 978-4-8087-0652-4.
- 京極夏彦 (2004). 多田克己・久保田一洋編 (ed.). Hokusai yōkai hyakkei 北斎妖怪百景 [Hokusai's 100 Views of Youkai]. 国書刊行会. ISBN 978-4-336-04636-9.
- 倉林正次他編著 (1987). Sōka-shi-shi 草加市史 [History of Soka City]. Vol. 民俗編. 草加市.
- 小池正胤 (1988). Edo no ehon – Shoki kusazōshi shūsei 江戸の絵本 初期草双紙集成 [Picture book of Edo – Early Kusazōshi compilation]. Vol. III. 国書刊行会. ISBN 978-4-336-02082-6.
- 静岡県方言研究会・静岡大学方言研究会共編 (1987). Zusetsu Shizuoka ken hōgen jiten 図説静岡県方言辞典 [Illustrated Dictionary of Shizuoka Prefecture Dialects]. 吉見書店.
- 柴田宵曲 (1963). Yōi hakubutsukan 妖異博物館 [Yōi Museum]. 青蛙房.
- 尚学図書編 (1986). jiko kotowaza no jiten 故事ことわざの辞典 [Dictionary of legends and proverbs]. 小学館. ISBN 978-4-09-501121-9.
- 鈴木棠三編 (1963). haisetsu kotowaza jiten 俳説ことわざ辞典 [Dictionary of legends and proverbs]. 東京堂出版.
- 鈴木棠三 (1982). Nihon zokushin jiten dōshokubutsu-hen 日本俗信辞典 動・植物編 [Japanese Folklore Dictionary – Animals & Plants]. 角川書店. ISBN 978-4-04-031100-5.
- 武光誠 (1998). Rekishi kara umareta nichijôgo no yurai jiten 歴史から生まれた日常語の由来辞典 [Etymological dictionary of everyday words drawn from history]. 東京堂出版. ISBN 978-4-490-10486-8.
- 近森敏夫 (1974). Tosa warabe uta no ki 土佐わらべうたの記 [Chronicle of Tosa nursery rhymes (warabe uta)]. 塙新書. 塙書房.
- 近森敏夫他 (1980). Akaoa machi-shi 赤岡町史 [History of Akaoka Town]. 赤岡町.
- 飛田健彦 (1998). Hyakkaten monogatari sendatsu no oshie ni miru akinai no kokoro 百貨店ものがたり 先達の教えにみる商いの心 [Department Store History – the Spirit of Our Trade found in the Teachings of our Predecessors]. 国書刊行会. ISBN 978-4-336-04100-5.
- 半藤一利 (1999). Issa Haiku to asobu 一茶俳句と遊ぶ [Playing with Issa Haiku]. PHP新書. PHP研究所. ISBN 978-4-569-60607-1.
- 日野巌 (2006) [1926]. Dōbutsu yōkai Tan 動物妖怪譚 [Animal Ghost Story]. 中公文庫. Vol. 下. 中央公論新社. ISBN 978-4-12-204792-1.
- 堀井令以知編 (1995). Osaka kotoba jiten 大坂ことば辞典 [Dictionary of Osaka Speech]. 東京堂出版. ISBN 978-4-490-10400-4.
- 村上健司編著 (2005). Nihon yōkai dai jiten 日本妖怪大事典 [Grand Dictionary of Japanese Yōkai]. Kwai books. 角川書店. ISBN 978-4-04-883926-6.
- 村上健司 (2008). "奇祭「狐の嫁入り」を訪ねて". Disukabâ yōkai nihon yōkai dai hyakka DISCOVER妖怪 日本妖怪大百科 [Discover Yôkai – Grand Dictionary of Japanese Yôkai]. KODANSHA Official File Magazine. Vol. 07. 講談社. ISBN 978-4-06-370037-4.
- 渡辺昭五他 (1994) [1985]. 渡辺静夫編 (ed.). Nihon dai hyaka zensho 日本大百科全書 [Grand Encyclopedia of Japan]. Vol. 第6巻 (2版 ed.). 小学館. ISBN 978-4-09-526106-5.
