= Hideshi =

- Gender: Male

Origin
- Origin: Japanese
- Meaning: Different meanings depending on the kanji used

Hideshi (written: 秀士, 秀司 or 日出志) is a masculine Japanese given name. Notable people with the name include:

- Hideshi Futori (太 栄志; born 1977), Japanese politician
- Hideshi Hamaguchi (濱口 秀司), Japanese businessman
- Hideshi Hino (日野 日出志; born 1946), Japanese manga artist
- Hideshi Ishikawa (石川 日出志; born 1954), Japanese archaeologist
- Hideshi Matsuda (松田 秀士; born 1954), Japanese racing driver
- Hideshi Miyake (三宅 秀史; 1934–2021), Japanese Nippon Professional Baseball third baseman and second baseman
