= Noto, Ishikawa =

Town in Hokuriku, Japan

Noto 能登町
- Town
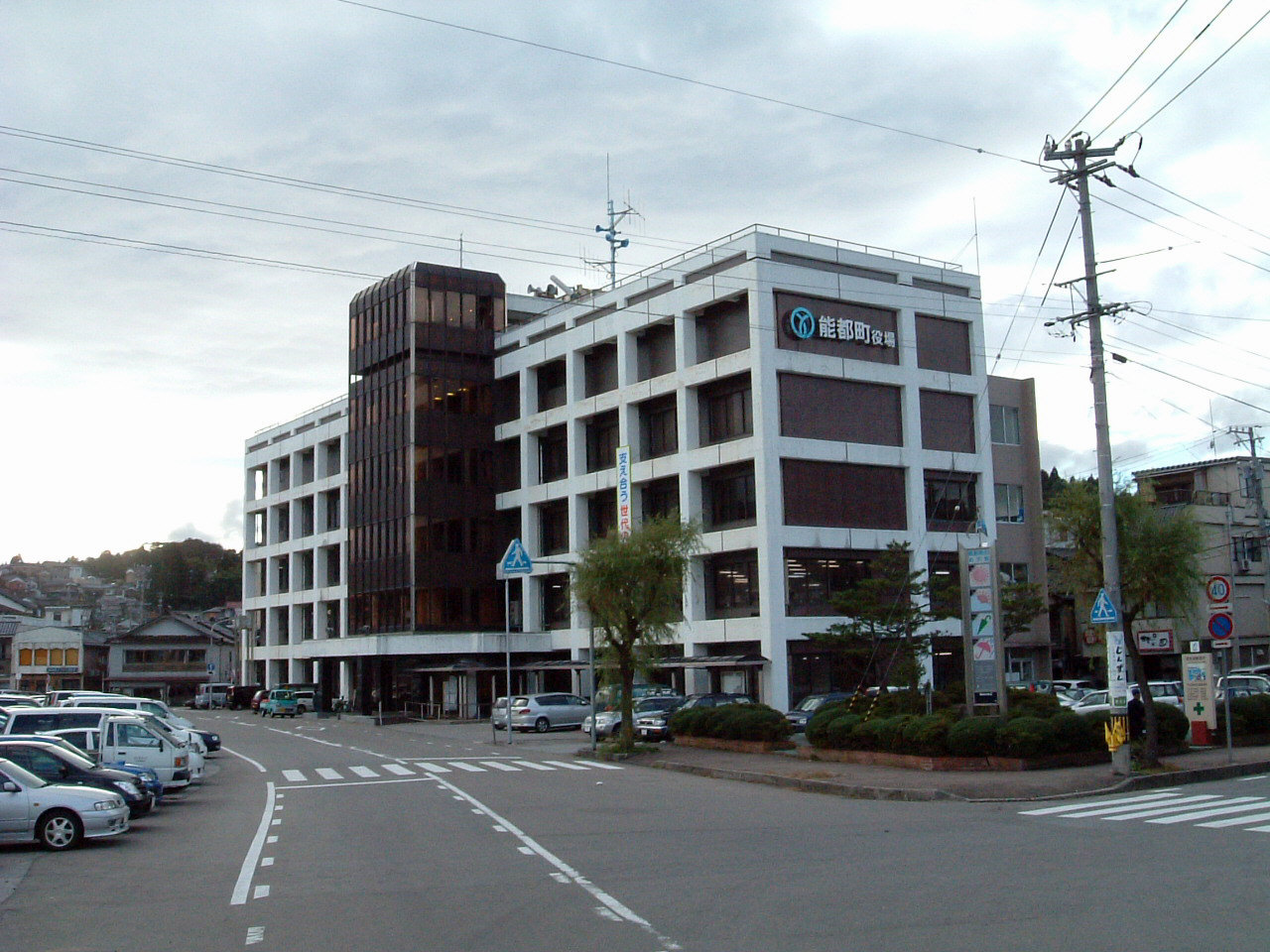
- Noto Town Hall

- Flag Seal

- Location of Noto in Ishikawa Prefecture

- Coordinates: 37°18′23.7″N 137°8′59.9″E
- Country: Japan
- Region: Chūbu; Hokuriku
- Prefecture: Ishikawa
- District: Hōsu

Area
  - Total: 273.27 km^{2} (105.51 sq mi)

Population (February 1, 2018)
  - Total: 15,687
  - Density: 57.405/km^{2} (148.68/sq mi)
- Time zone: UTC+9 (Japan Standard Time)
- City symbols
- Tree: Ilex integra
- Bird: Crested kingfisher
- Fish: Japanese amberjack
- Phone number: 0768-62-1000
- Address: Noto-cho, Hōsu-gun, Ishikawa-ken 927-0492
- Website: Official website

Noto (能登町, Noto-chō) is a town located in Hōsu District (formerly Fugeshi District, Ishikawa Prefecture, Japan. As of 1 October 2020, the town had an estimated population of 15,687 in 7,689 households, and a population density of 65 persons per km^{2}. The total area of the town was 273.27 square kilometres (105.51 sq mi).

== Geography ==
Noto occupies the northeastern coastline of Noto Peninsula, facing the Sea of Japan on the east and south. Noto has a humid subtropical climate (Köppen Cfa) characterized by mild summers and cold winters with heavy snowfall. The average annual temperature in Noto is 12.8 °C. The average annual rainfall is 2282 mm with September as the wettest month. The temperatures are highest on average in August, at around 25.2 °C, and lowest in January, at around 2.1 °C.

Much of the town is within the limits of the Noto Hantō Quasi-National Park.

=== Neighbouring municipalities ===
- Ishikawa Prefecture
  - Anamizu
  - Suzu
  - Wajima

== Demographics ==
Per Japanese census data, the population of Noto has declined over the past 50 years.

Historical population
Year	Pop.	±%
1970	33,138	—
1980	31,277	−5.6%
1990	28,065	−10.3%
2000	23,673	−15.6%
2010	19,565	−17.4%
2020	15,687	−19.8%

== History ==
The area around Noto was part of ancient Noto Province. During the Sengoku Period (1467–1568), the area was contested between the Hatakeyama clan, Uesugi clan and Maeda clan, with the area becoming part of Kaga Domain under the Edo period Tokugawa shogunate. Following the Meiji restoration, the area was organised into Fugeshi District, Ishikawa.

On March 1, 2005, the town of Noto and the village of Yanagida, both formerly from Fugeshi District, merged with the town of Uchiura, formerly from Suzu District, to form the new town of Noto. Also on this date, Fugeshi District merged with Suzu District to become the newly created Hōsu District. The kanji of the name was changed from 能都 to 能登 after the merger, but the pronunciation remains the same.

== Education ==
Noto has six public elementary schools and four public middle schools operated by the town government, and one public high school operated by the Ishikawa Prefectural Board of Education.

The high school is Ishikawa Prefectural Noto High School.

Closed:

- Ishikawa Prefectural Noto Hokushin High School
- Ishikawa Prefectural Yanagida Agricultural High School
- Ishikawa Prefectural Noto Seisho High School

== Transportation ==
=== Railway ===
- The town has no passenger railway service since the closure of the Noto Line on April 1, 2005.

=== Highway ===
National Route 249

== Local attractions ==
- Abare Festival
- Mawaki Jōmon site, a wetland site occupied between the Early Jōmon period and the last stage of the Final Jōmon periods.
- Squid King

== Mascot ==
Notorin, the city's mascot

Noto's mascot is Notorin (のっとりん), a fairy of the Satoyama-Satoumi sea. Her name comes from the Noto dialect meaning "momentous". Her body is made up of "no" hiragana letter. She is green (to represent Satoyama and Satoumi) and blue (to represent the sea). Her body contains a wave pattern as well. Her feet are coloured purple to symbolize blueberries. She wears a rhododendron obtusum flower on her head. She is designed by Fujio Kuroda from Shizuoka Prefecture.
