= Noto Province =

Former province of Japan

Noto Province 能登国
- pre-Meiji period Japan
- 718–1871
- Map of Japanese provinces (1868) with Noto Province highlighted
- Capital: Nanao
- Area
  - Coordinates: 37°2′N 136°58′E
- History
  - Split from Echizen: 718
  - Merged into Etchū: 741
  - Re-established: 757
  - Part of Kaga Domain: 1583
  - Disestablished: 1871
  - Merged with Ishikawa Prefecture: 1872
- Today part of: part of Ishikawa Prefecture

Noto Province (能登国, Noto no Kuni; Japanese pronunciation: [nó̞.tò̞ (nò̞ kɯ̈̀.ɲ̟ì)]) was a province of Japan in the area that is today the northern part of Ishikawa Prefecture in Japan, including the Noto Peninsula (Noto-hantō) which is surrounded by the Sea of Japan. Noto bordered on Etchū and Kaga provinces to the south, and was surrounded by the Sea of Japan to the east, north and west. Its abbreviated form name was Nōshū (能州).

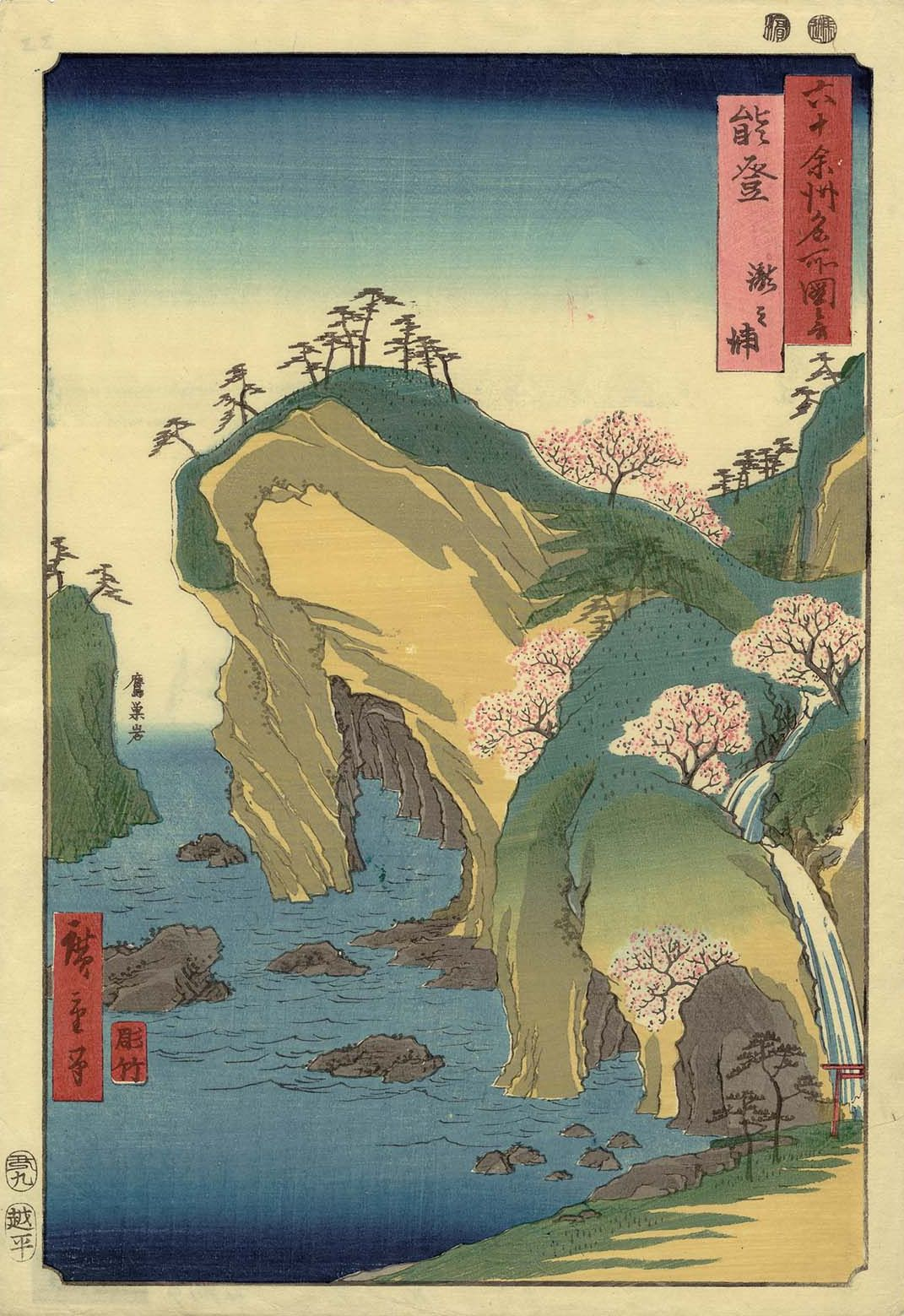
Hiroshige ukiyo-e "Noto" in "Famous Views of the Sixty-odd Provinces" (六十余州名所図会), depicting Taki-no-ura

== History ==
In 718 A.D., four districts of Echizen Province, Hakui District, Noto District (also called Kashima District), Fugeshi District and Suzu District, were separated into Noto Province. However, in the year 741, the province was abolished, and merged into Etchū Province. Noto Province was subsequently re-established in 757.

The province disappears from history until the Wamyō Ruijushō of 930 AD, in which Minamoto no Shitagō is named as Kokushi of the province.

The Nara period provincial capital and provincial temple were located in what is now the city of Nanao, Ishikawa; however, the Ichinomiya (Keta Shrine) was located in what is now the city of Hakui, Ishikawa. Under the Engishiki classification system, Noto was ranked as a "middle country" (中国) in both importance and distance from the capital.

During the Sengoku period, Nanao Castle was a major stronghold of the Hatakeyama clan, and was contested by the Uesugi clan and Maeda clan. The area became part Kaga Domain controlled by the Maeda clan under the Edo period Tokugawa shogunate, with the exception of some scattered small holdings which retained by the shogunate directly as tenryō territory and administered by hatamoto for strategic purposes.

Following the Meiji Restoration and the abolition of the han system in 1871, Noto Province was renamed Nanao Prefecture and Imizu District from Etchū Province was added. However, in 1872 Nanao was merged with Kanazawa Prefecture (the former Kaga Province) to form modern Ishikawa Prefecture and Imizu District was given back to Niikawa Prefecture (the renamed Etchū Province). However, “Noto Province” continued to appear in official documents afterwards for some administrative purposes. For example, Noto is explicitly recognized in treaties in 1894 (a) between Japan and the United States and (b) between Japan and the United Kingdom.

== Historical districts ==
Noto Province consisted of four districts:

- Ishikawa Prefecture
  - Fugeshi District (鳳至郡) - dissolved; now the western part of Hōsu District (鳳珠郡)
  - Hakui District (羽咋郡)
  - Kashima District (鹿島郡)
  - Suzu District (珠洲郡) - dissolved; now the eastern part of Hōsu District
