= Cybozu =

Japanese software company

Cybozu Inc.
- Type: Kabushiki gaisha
- Traded as: TYO: 4776
- Industry: Software
- Founded: August 8, 1997; 28 years ago in Matsuyama, Ehime, Japan
- Founders: Toru Takasuka, Yoshihisa Aono, Shinya Hata
- Headquarters: Tokyo, Japan
- Subsidiaries: Cybozu Research Institute Inc.; Cybozu Labs, Inc.; Cybozu IT Shanghai Inc.; Cybozu Vietnam Co., Ltd.; kintone Corporation
- Website: Japanese English

Cybozu, Inc. (サイボウズ株式会社, Saibōzu Kabushikigaisha) is a Tokyo-based software company that provides web-based groupware services including Cybozu Office and kintone. In addition to the main office in Tokyo, Cybozu also has offices in Matsuyama and Osaka, as well as several overseas subsidiaries in countries including Vietnam, China, Australia and the United States. The U.S.-based subsidiary, kintone Corporation, is located in San Francisco, California.

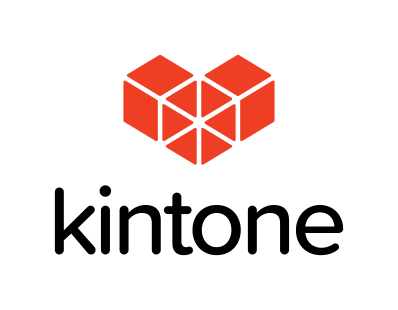
kintone Corporation logo

== Background ==
In 1997, Toru Takasuka resigned as the Vice President/Director of Matsushita Electric Works V-Internet Operations, an in-house venture company he helped to create. Along with partners Yoshihisa Aono and Shinya Hata, he started the software company in Matsuyama, Ehime with a $200,000 loan from family and friends. The company aimed to produce Japan's first web-based groupware products. Cybozu, Japanese for "cyber-kid", rapidly gained market share in the Japanese market. Within three years the company went public – at that time the fastest company rise to IPO in the history of Japan's 2nd section of the Tokyo Stock Exchange. Today Cybozu is the number one groupware producer in Japan. They are currently listed on the 1st section of the Tokyo Stock Exchange.

Cybozu prides itself on having a corporate culture that enables its employees to have a healthy work-life balance. In 2017, Cybozu was listed by Great Place to Work as the number one mid-sized Japanese company for women.

In November 2013, Cybozu along with Zendesk launched their joint marketing efforts at the cybozu.com conference on cloud computing in Tokyo.
