= Nōshū =

Nōshū or Noshu may refer to:

- Nōshū (濃州)
  - Nōshū, another name for Mino Province.
- Nōshū (能州)
  - Nōshū, another name for Noto Province.
