= Uchiura, Ishikawa =

Dissolved municipality in Ishikawa prefecture, Japan

Uchiura (内浦町, Uchiura-machi) was a town located in Hosu District (formerly known as Suzu District), Ishikawa Prefecture, Japan.

As of 2003, the town had an estimated population of 7,332 and a density of 136.21 persons per km^{2}. The total area was 53.83 km^{2}.

On March 1, 2005, Uchiura, along with the former town of Noto, and the village of Yanagida (both from Fugeshi District), was merged to create the new town of Noto (in the newly created Hōsu District, which was created at the same day) and no longer exists as in independent municipality.

The town was located on the Uchiura Bay, near Anamizu.
