= Yanagida, Ishikawa =

Dissolved municipality in Ishikawa prefecture, Japan

Yanagida (Japanese: 柳田村, Hepburn: Yanagida-mura) was a village located in Fugeshi District, Ishikawa Prefecture, Japan.

As of 2003, the village had an estimated population of 4,101 and a density of 39.38 persons per km^{2}. The total area was 104.14 km^{2}.

On March 1, 2005, Yanagida, along with the former town of Noto (also from Fugeshi District), and the town of Uchiura (from Suzu District), was merged to create the new town of Noto (in the newly created Hōsu District, Ishikawa, which was created at the same day) and no longer exists as in independent municipality.
