= Toru Takasuka =

Japanese software entrepreneur (born 1966)

Toru Takasuka (高須賀 宣, Takasuka Tōru; born 1966) is a Japanese software entrepreneur.

Takasuka founded Cybozu, one of Japan's first web-based groupware products. In 1997, with a $200,000 loan and two partners, Takasuka left his position as Vice President of Matsushita Electric Works V-Internet Operations in Osaka, Japan for the small city of Matsuyama, where he began developing Cybozu. Japanese for "cyber-kid", Cybozu held an initial public offering (IPO) within three years. In April 2005, Takasuka resigned his position as President and CEO at Cybozu. In January 2006, he co-founded LUNARR, Inc. with his business partner, Hideshi Hamaguchi in Portland, Oregon, U.S.A. He currently lives in both Portland, Oregon and Tokyo, Japan.

== Personal history ==
He was born in 1966, in Matsuyama, Ehime, Japan.

== Education ==
1990, B.S. in Engineering Management, Hiroshima Institute of Technology

== Professional ==
He joined Matsushita Electric Works in 1990, working in client-server networking and R&D. In 1994, he developed Japan's first corporate intranet with Hideshi Hamaguchi. In 1996, he became Vice President and Director of V-Internet Operations at Matsushita Electric Works, an in-house venture company he helped create.
