= Ishikawa (surname) =

Ishikawa (written: 石川 lit. "stone river") is the 28th most common Japanese surname. Notable people with the surname include:

- Akio Ishikawa (石川 陽生; born 1963), Japanese shogi player
- Arisa Ishikawa (石川 安里沙) or Sumire (1987–2009), Japanese fashion model
- Bun'yō Ishikawa (石川 文洋; born 1938), Japanese photographer and photojournalist
- Chiaki Ishikawa (石川智晶; born 1969), Japanese musician
- Chu Ishikawa (石川 忠; born 1966), Japanese composer and musician
- Daichi Ishikawa (石川 大地; born 1996), Japanese footballer
- Goemon Ishikawa (石川 五右衛門; 1558–1594), Japanese outlaw hero
- Hajime Ishikawa (石川 元; born 1941), Japanese rower
- Haruna Ishikawa (石川 晴菜; born 1994), Japanese alpine skier
- Hideo Ishikawa (石川 英郎; born 1969), Japanese voice actor
- Hideshi Ishikawa (石川 日出志; born 1954), Japanese archaeologist
- Jun Ishikawa (石川 淳; 1899–1987), Japanese author
- Kaito Ishikawa (石川 界人; born 1993), Japanese voice actor
- Kaoru Ishikawa (石川 馨; 1915–1989), Japanese university professor, developer of the Ishikawa diagram
- Kasumi Ishikawa (石川 佳純; born 1993), female Japanese table tennis player
- Kei Ishikawa (石川 慧; born 1993), Japanese footballer
- Kenji Ishikawa (石川 健二; born 1946), Japanese swimmer
- Koji Ishikawa (いしかわ こうじ; born 1963), Japanese children's book author and illustrator
- Kōyō Ishikawa (石川 光陽; 1904–1989), Japanese photographer
- Mana Ishikawa (石川 真菜; born 2009), Japanese swimmer
- Masamochi Ishikawa (石川 雅望; 1754–1830), Japanese scholar, poet and writer
- Mayu Ishikawa (石川 真佑; born 2000), Japanese female volleyball player.
- Melody Miyuki Ishikawa (born 1982), Japanese-American pop singer and television host
- Miki Ishikawa (born 1991), Japanese-American actress and singer
- Miyuki Ishikawa (石川 ミユキ; 1897–1987), Japanese midwife and serial killer
- Masaji Ishikawa (石川 昌司; born 1947), North Korean defector and author
- Naohiro Ishikawa (石川 直宏; born 1981), Japanese football player
- Rika Ishikawa (石川 梨華; born 1985), Japanese idol, former member of Morning Musume
- Rokuro Ishikawa (石川 六郎; 1925–2005), Japanese businessman
- Ryo Ishikawa (石川 遼; born 1991), Japanese professional golfer
- Sanshirō Ishikawa (石川 三四郎; 1876-1956), Japanese anarcho-syndicalist
- Sayuri Ishikawa (石川 さゆり; born 1958), Japanese enka singer
- Shō Ishikawa (石川 翔; born 1999), Japanese baseball player
- Shoko Ishikawa (石川 翔子; born 1990), Japanese figure skater
- Shuji Ishikawa (石川 修司; born 1975), Japanese professional wrestler
- Takaya Ishikawa (石川 昂弥; born 2001), Japanese baseball player
- Takuboku Ishikawa (石川 啄木; 1886–1912), Japanese poet
- Tatsuya Ishikawa (石川 竜也; born 1979), Japanese footballer
- Tatsuzō Ishikawa (石川 達三; 1905–1985), Japanese writer
- Tomohiro Ishikawa (石川 知裕; 1973–2025), Japanese politician
- Travis Ishikawa (born 1983), American professional baseball first baseman
- Yozo Ishikawa (石川 要三; 1925–2014), Japanese politician
- Yui Ishikawa (石川 由依; born 1989), Japanese voice actress
- Yuki Ishikawa (石川 雄規; born 1967), Japanese professional wrestler
- Yuki Ishikawa (石川 勇希; born 1995), Japanese professional wrestler
- Yuki Ishikawa (石川 祐希; born 1995), Japanese male volleyball player

== Fictional characters ==
- Keiko Ishikawa, a character in the American science fiction television series Star Trek: The Next Generation
- Ishikawa (Ghost in the Shell), a character in the Japanese seinen manga Ghost in the Shell
- Sensei Sadanobu Ishikawa, a character in the video game Ghost of Tsushima, voiced by and with motion-capture by François Chau
- Goemon Ishikawa XIII, a character in the Japanese manga series Lupin III
- Fumiko Ishikawa, a character in popular FNF community Skyverse
- Keisuke Ishikawa, comic relief antagonist in 1999 video game Racing Lagoon
- Ryo Ishikawa, the main antagonist in the video game Shogo: Mobile Armor Division
