= Monzen, Ishikawa =

Dissolved municipality in Ishikawa prefecture, Japan

Monzen (門前町, Monzen-machi) was a town located in Hōsu District (formerly from Fugeshi District), Ishikawa Prefecture, Japan.

As of 2003, the town had an estimated population of 7,512 and a density of 47.68 persons per km^{2}. The total area was 157.56 km^{2}.

On February 1, 2006, Monzen was merged into the expanded city of Wajima.
