= Squid King =

Large squid statue in Noto, Ishikawa, Japan

- Squid King in 2024
- Year: 2021
- Medium: fibre-reinforced plastic
- Subject: Japanese flying squid
- Dimensions: 400 cm × 800 cm × 1300 cm (160 in × 310 in × 510 in)
- Weight: 5 tonnes
- Location: Noto, Ishikawa, Japan
- 37°18′44″N 137°13′48″E

Squid King (Japanese: イカキング, Hepburn: Ika Kingu) is a statue of a Japanese flying squid in Noto, Ishikawa, Japan. Designed to promote tourism and the town's fishing industry, the statue attracted widespread criticism as its construction had mostly been paid for with ¥25,000,000 (equivalent to ¥27,186,312 in 2024) from the town's COVID-19 relief money. According to the town, the statue and resulting media coverage resulted in a boost to the town's tourism industry.

== Description ==
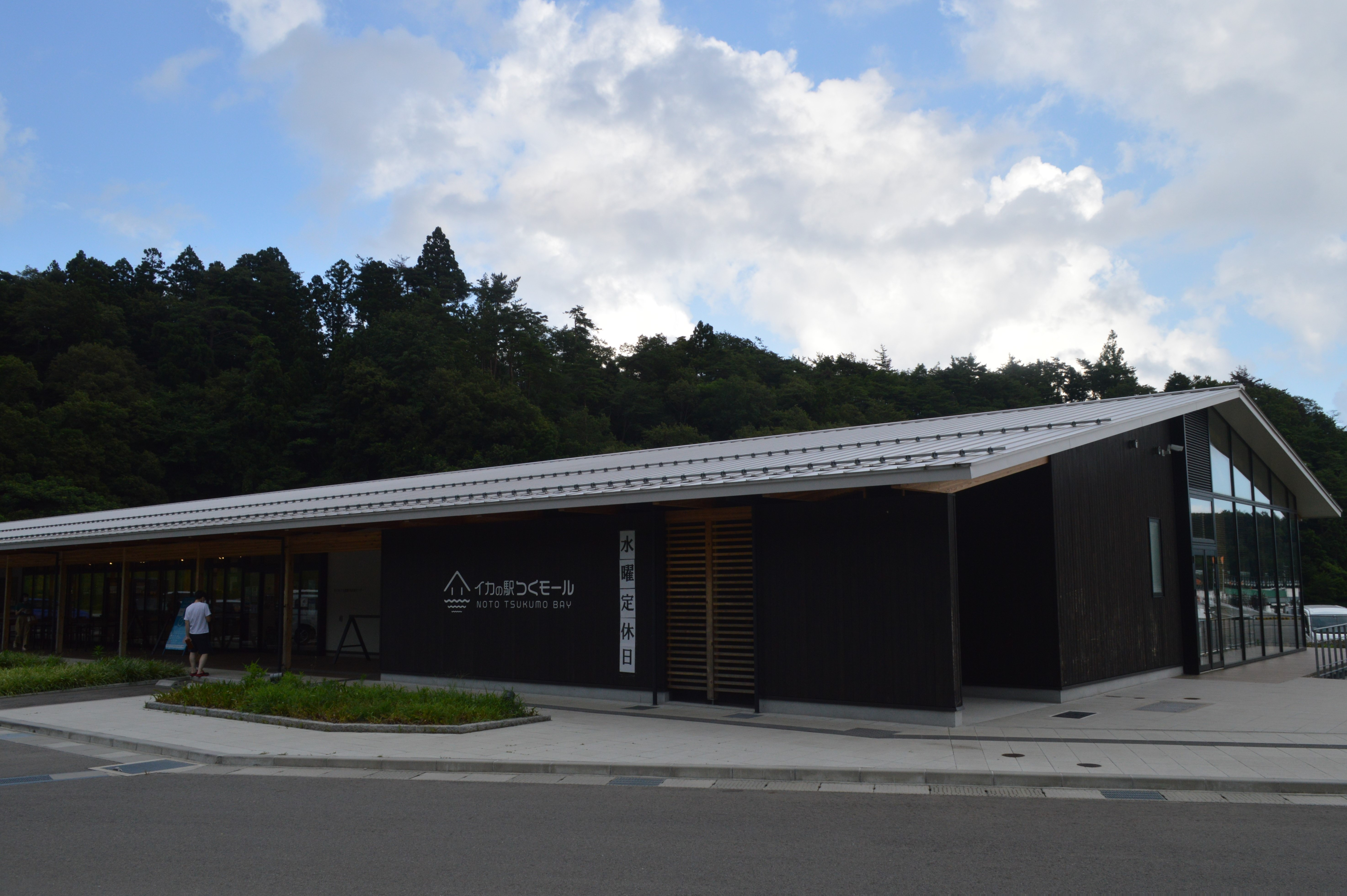
The Squid Station Mall, where the statue is located

The Squid King is a fibre-reinforced plastic lifelike statue of a "giant" pink and white Japanese flying squid (Todarodes pacificus). The statue is 13 metres (43 ft) long, 4 metres (13 ft) tall, 9 metres (30 ft) wide, and weighs around 5 tonnes (11,000 lb). It has long legs, "goggling eyes", and there is a hole in the statue located where a real squid's mouth would be, to allow people to look out from inside the squid. Squid King is located in front of Tsukumo Bay in Noto, Ishikawa's Noto Tsukumo Bay Tourism Exchange Center (のと九十九湾観光交流センター, Noto Tsukumo-wan Kankō Kōryu Sentā), also known as the Squid Station Mall (イカの駅つくモール, Ika no Ekitsuku Mōru). It was officially named Squid King (イカキング, Ika Kingu) in June 2021 after a public contest; the town received 909 submissions for names. During the naming ceremony, the town installed a plaque by the statue. Squid King has an official X account.

== Construction ==
The statue's construction cost ¥27,000,000 (equivalent to ¥29,361,217 in 2024), with 25 million coming from COVID-19 relief funds and grants given to Noto by the Japanese government and the rest coming from the town. Noto had been given ¥800,000,000 (equivalent to ¥869,961,977 in 2024) by the Japanese government to help it through the COVID-19 pandemic. According to Noto town, the Squid King was designed to aid the town by promoting tourism and the town's fishing industry. The theme of the statue was chosen so tourists could eat squid at the local shops and be "eaten" by a giant squid themselves. The town additionally planned to build a "shop, restaurant, tourist information center and exhibition corner", later the Noto Tsukumo Bay Tourism Exchange Centre, starring Squid King. The mall itself cost ¥520,000,000 (equivalent to ¥565,475,285 in 2024) to build.

== Reception ==
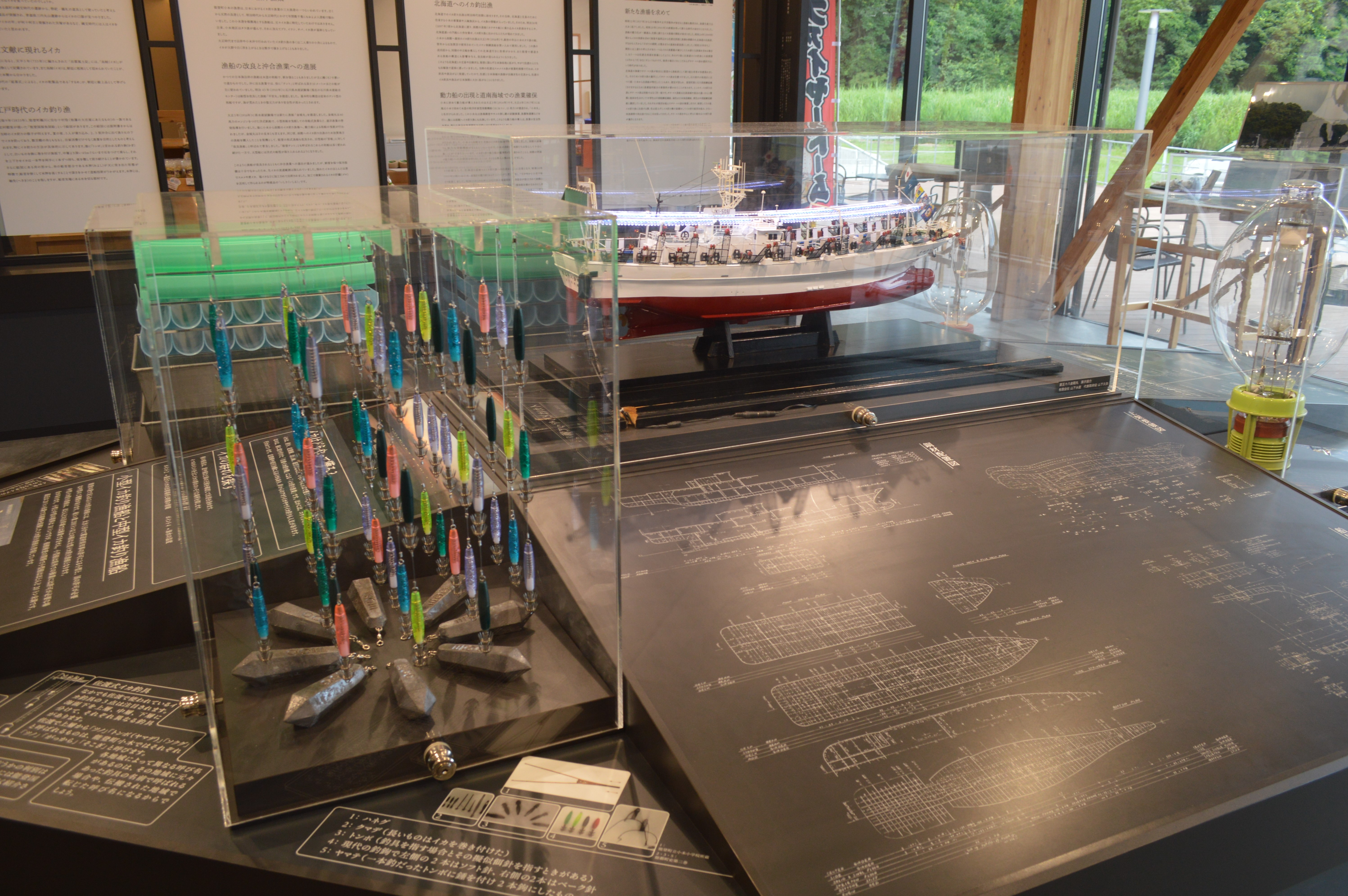
A display in the mall about squids and Noto's fishing industry

Squid King was revealed to the public in April 2021 and met with widespread criticism because it had been constructed with COVID-19 relief funds. Several residents felt that their money should have gone to healthcare workers or other causes more directly related to the COVID-19 virus. The resulting controversy was covered in non-Japanese media such as the BBC and The New York Times. After a while it gained a following, partially resulting from its international coverage. According to the Mainichi Shimbun, the statue had become "symbolic" of the town. A study published by Noto township in 2022 said that the town's economy had experienced a ¥604,000,000 (equivalent to ¥656,821,293 in 2024) boost from tourism and 45% of the 439 tourists they surveyed answered that they had come to Noto to see Squid King.

The statue survived the January 2024 Noto earthquake and resulting tsunami with little to no damage. In the immediate aftermath, the Squid King official Twitter account posted "I didn't return to the sea." The statue's survival was seen by some residents, especially city officials, as a symbol of recovery and hope. However, others were more indifferent. Squid Station Mall, which was closed as a result of the earthquake, re-opened in April. In October 2024, the town made Squid King the honorary chairman of their Junior Police Officer program (少年補導員), as part of a move to educate the children of Noto about crime prevention. In June 2025, the Hokuriku Chunichi Newspaper sponsored a festival to commemorate the opening of the statue, with performances and demonstrations by local children.
