= Noto, Ishikawa (Fugeshi) =

Dissolved municipality in Fugeshi district, Ishikawa prefecture, Japan

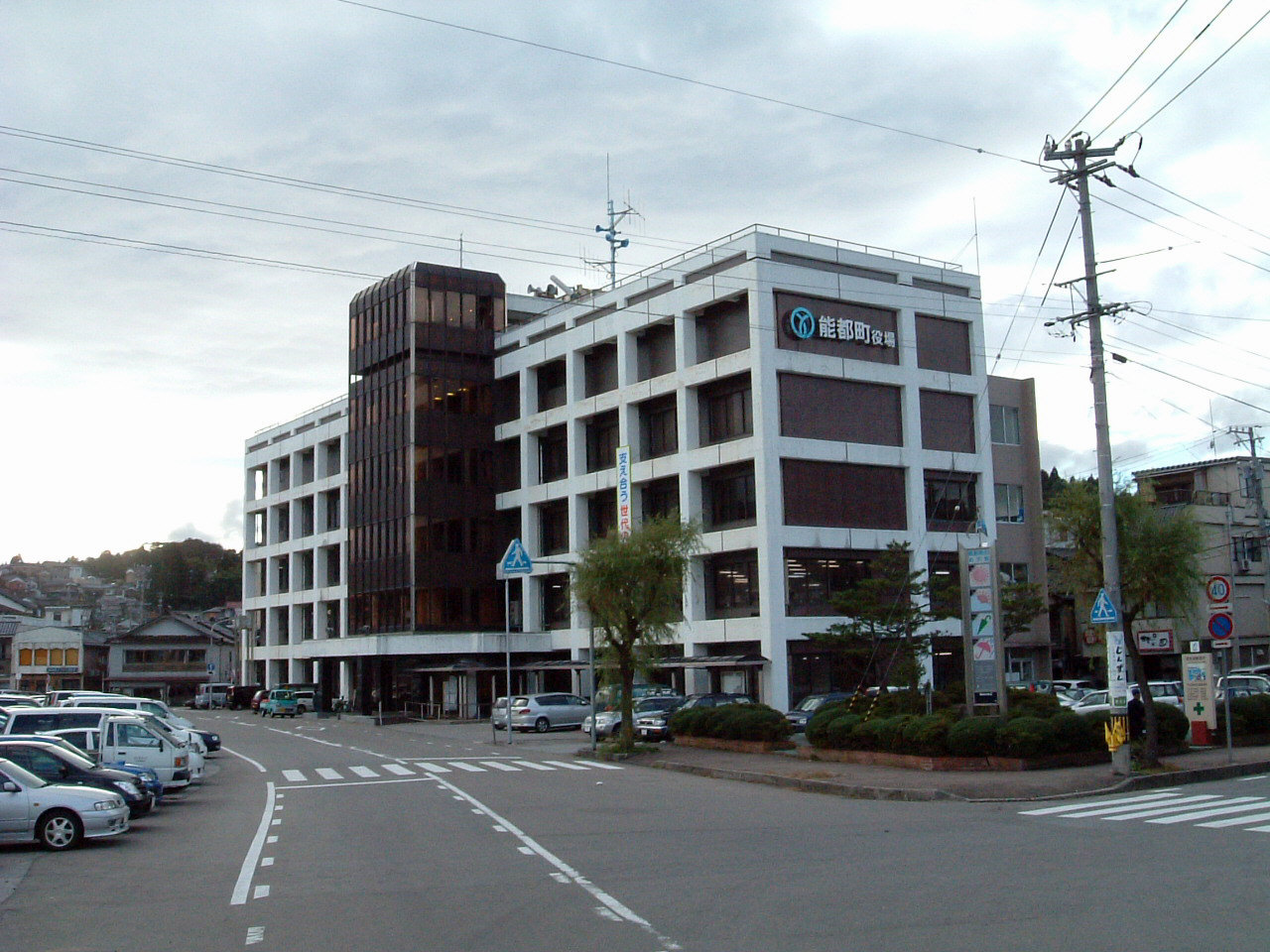
former Noto Town Office

Noto (能都町, Noto-machi) was a town located in Fugeshi District, Ishikawa Prefecture, Japan.

As of 2003, the town had an estimated population of 10,596 and a density of 91.76 persons per km^{2}. The total area was 115.48 km^{2}.

On March 1, 2005, Noto absorbed the village of Yanagida (also from Fugeshi District), and the town of Uchiura (from Suzu District), to create the new town of Noto (in the newly created Hōsu District, Ishikawa, which was created at the same day) and no longer exists as in independent municipality.
