= Hideshi Hamaguchi =

Japanese concept creator and business strategist

Hideshi Hamaguchi (濱口 秀司, Hamaguchi Hideshi) is a Japanese concept creator and strategist in the business field. Hamaguchi is also called a business designer or an innovation designer.

He is considered a leading mind in creative concept development, strategy-building and decision management in the United States and Japan.

A self-proclaimed "creative visual thinker" and "diagram-lover", Hamaguchi uses visual models to bring what he calls "simplexity" and "structured chaos" to the process of brainstorming, helping businesses generate creative ideas and strategies in various industries & businesses.

== Education ==
Hamaguchi holds a B.S. in Chemical Engineering from Kyoto University, Kyoto, Japan

== Professional ==
Hamaguchi is acknowledged for the BET theory of TiO_{2} (titanium dioxide,) an energy production photocatalyst called the Honda-Fujishima effect.

Hamaguchi started his business career with Panasonic Corporation (former Matsushita Electric Works, Ltd.) in Japan. In 1993, he became one of their first corporate decision analysts, supporting board members and executives with strategic decision making. In 1994, he created the concept of the Intranet and developed Japan's first corporate Intranet with Toru Takasuka. From 1998 to 2001, he served as a strategist at Ziba Design, Inc. in Portland, Oregon and led award winning projects, including IDEA (International Design Excellence Awards) gold awarded projects. While at Ziba, he created the concept of the world's first USB flash drive. IBM first marketed the drives in North America in 2000, with its product the "DiskOnKey" (manufactured by the Israeli company M-Systems). In 2002, he helped the start-up of MDRM, an Israeli company developing technology for digital rights management through flash memory cards. (SanDisk acquired MDRM in December 2004.) In 2001, Hamaguchi returned to Panasonic Electric Works, Ltd. During his time there he was Director of the New Business Planning Group in Japan and Executive Vice President of Panasonic Electric Works Laboratory of America, Inc. in the U.S.A.

In 2006 he founded LUNARR Inc. with his business partner Toru Takasuka in Portland, Oregon, U.S.A. He was COO of LUNARR, Inc. In 2009 he returned to Ziba Design as Director of Strategy. In 2012 he became a juror of the Red Dot Design Award.

Hamaguchi has developed his own theory and methodology (Model Based Approach) for creative concept and strategy building through his experiences in various industries, businesses and technologies. Hamaguchi is Yanko Design's Design Strategist.

== Public Speaking ==
While at Ziba Design, Hamaguchi has participated at the following public speaking events:

- "Theory and Approach for Innovative Concepts" - NikkeiBP Top Leader Platinum Seminar - Tokyo, Japan (04-21-2010)
- "Framework-ing" - Diamond DMN (Design Management Network) - Seminar - Tokyo, Japan (06-03-2010)
- "Is Innovation Methodology Possible?" - i.school Summer Symposium 2010 (University of Tokyo) - Keynote Speech - Tokyo, Japan (08-28-2010)
- "Culture Codes: A Framework for Culture Based Design" - BODW2010 - Keynote Speech - Hong Kong, China (12-04-2010)
- "The Manner of Innovation" - Super Network Event (Kyoto University) - Speech - Kyoto, Japan (05-29-2011)
- "Designing Business Innovation" - Knowledge of Design Week 2011 (HKDC) - Keynote Speech and Workshop - Hong Kong, China (06-24-2011)
- "Creative Process for Innovation" - Creativities Unfold, Bangkok 2011 (TCDC) - Keynote Speech and Workshop - Bangkok, Thailand(09-30-2011, 10-02-2011)
- "Dynamic Frameworking" - Diamond DMN - Seminar - Tokyo, Japan (10-27-2011, 11-17-2011, 01-19-2012)
- "Break the Bias"- TEDxPortland 2012 - Speech - Portland, Oregon (04-21-2012)
- "Be A Business Designer!"- i.school Executive Seminar (University of Tokyo) - Speech - Tokyo, Japan (05-08-2012)

== Personal history ==
Born in Osaka, Japan. He used to live in Beaverton, Oregon but moved to Los Angeles, California.
