= Hōsu District =

District in Ishikawa, Japan

Coordinates: 37.295°N 137.034°E

Hosu District in Ishikawa Prefecture.

Hōsu (鳳珠郡, Hōsu-gun) is a district located in Ishikawa Prefecture, Japan. The current total area is 456.69 km^{2}.

== Towns ==
The district consists of two towns:

- Anamizu
- Noto

== History ==
On March 1, 2005 the village of Yanagida and the town of Noto (both from Fugeshi District) were merged with the town of Uchiura (from Suzu District) to form the new town of Noto.

This merger effectively merged both Suzu and Fugeshi Districts and put Hōsu District in these areas since the borders of two districts had been wiped out. At the same time, the towns of Anamizu and Monzen (both formerly from Fugeshi District), became towns in Hōsu District.

The new district takes one kanji from each of its predecessors: the first kanji comes from Fugeshi (鳳至) and the second comes from Suzu (珠洲).

=== Changes since the creation ===
- March 1, 2005 - Suzu and Fugeshi Districts were merged to form Hōsu District.
- February 1, 2006 - The town of Monzen was merged into the expanded city of Wajima.
