= Fugeshi District =

Former district in Ishikawa prefecture, Japan

Fugeshi
- District of Japan
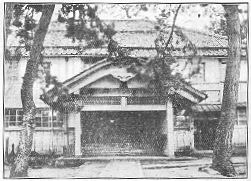
- Area
  - 2003: 560.42 km^{2} (216.38 sq mi)
- Population
  - 2003: 32,915
- Contained within
  - Prefecture: Ishikawa
- Today part of: Japan

Fugeshi (鳳至郡, Fugeshi-gun) was a district located in Ishikawa Prefecture, Japan.

As of 2003, the district had an estimated population of 32,915 with a density of 58.73 persons per km^{2}. The total area was 560.42 km^{2}.

== Municipalities ==
Prior to its dissolution, due to the Hōsu District merger, the district consisted of three towns and one village:

- Anamizu (Note: Classified as a town.)
- Monzen
- Noto
- Yanagida (Note: Classified as a village.)

== History ==
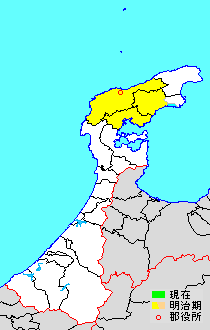
Map showing original extent of Fugeshi District in Ishikawa Prefecture: * yellow - areas formerly within the district borders during the early Meiji period

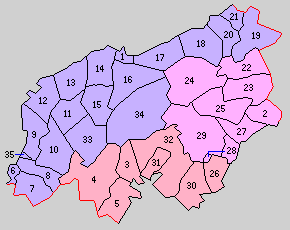
Colored areas are in this district.

=== Recent mergers ===
- On March 1, 2005 - The former town of Noto and the village of Yanagida were merged with the town of Uchiura (from Suzu District) to form the new town of Noto. Therefore, both districts were merged to form Hōsu District and were dissolved as a result.

== See also ==
- List of dissolved districts of Japan
