= Hideshi Ishikawa =

Japanese archaeologist

Hideshi Ishikawa (石川 日出志, Ishikawa Hideshi; born 1954) is a Japanese archaeologist. Since 1978 he has been on the faculty of Meiji University, in the Archaeology Department. He is considered an expert in the Yayoi period and the Bronze-Iron Age history and culture of the Korean peninsula, and Jōmon culture and pottery. He has published several books and papers, including books about ruins of the Yayoi era (2008) and on agrarian society in ancient Japanese history (2010).
