= Panasonic Electric Works =

Japanese electronics company

Panasonic Electric Works Co., Ltd.
- Native name: パナソニック電工株式会社
- Type: Subsidiary
- Industry: Industrial devices
- Predecessor: Aromat; Matsushita Electric Works, Ltd.
- Founded: 1918; 108 years ago
- Founder: Konosuke Matsushita
- Headquarters: Shinbashi, Tokyo, Japan
- Number of employees: 56,103 (connected)
- Parent: Panasonic

Panasonic Electric Works Co., Ltd. (パナソニック電工株式会社; named "Matsushita Electric Works, Ltd. (松下電工株式会社; MEW)" until September 30, 2008) is a Japanese company specializing in the production of industrial devices. It can trace its beginnings to a firm that was founded in 1918 by Konosuke Matsushita. Matsushita began making the flashlight components for bicycles, then progressed to making lighting fixtures.

During World War II, the company manufactured everything from airplane propellers to light sockets. At the conclusion of World War II the U.S.A. forced the company to split into two separate companies, Matsushita Electric Works, Ltd. (MEW), and Matsushita Electric Industrial Co., Ltd. (MEI) (which became Panasonic).

MEW conducts business in automation controls, electronic materials, lighting products, information equipment, and wiring products, building products and home appliances. In 2004 MEW began a pursuit of collaborate business ties with its brother company, MEI.

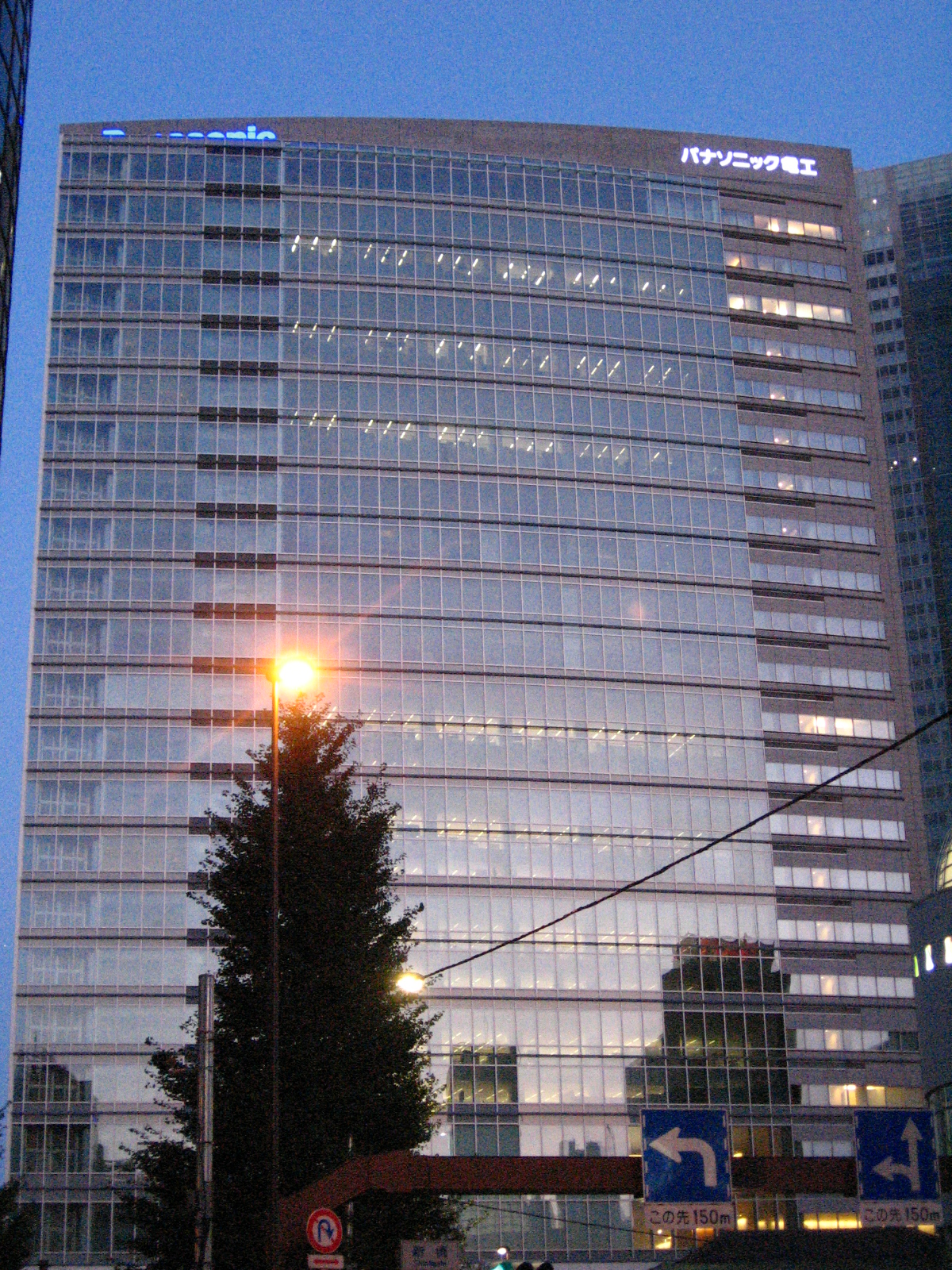
Panasonic Electric Works head office in Shinbashi, Tokyo.

In 2005, the company was renamed from Aromat to Panasonic Electric Works.

On July 29, 2010, Panasonic reached an agreement to acquire the remaining shares of Panasonic Electric Works and Sanyo shares for $9.4 billion.

In 2007, Panasonic acquired Indian company Anchor Electricals Pvt. Ltd.
