= Ishikawa =

Ishikawa may refer to:

== Places ==
- Ishikawa Prefecture, a prefecture in the Chūbu region on Honshū island, Japan
- Ishikawa District, Ishikawa, a former district in Ishikawa Prefecture, Japan
- Ishikawa District, Fukushima, a district in Fukushima Prefecture, Japan
- Ishikawa, Fukushima, town in Ishikawa District, Fukushima Prefecture
- Ishikawa, Okinawa, a city in Okinawa Prefecture, Japan
- Ishikawa (restaurant), a Michelin 3-star sushi restaurant in Shinjuku, Tokyo Japan

== People ==
- Ishikawa (surname)
- Ishikawa clan, a Japanese clan mainly active during the Sengoku Period
