= Oku-Noto Triennale =

The arts festival Oku-Noto Triennale (Japanese 奥能登芸術祭) takes place every three years in Suzu, Japan. Contemporary artists install site-specific works in the city and surrounding countryside and region. During the event, local residents offer guided tours and lectures. The festival took place for the first time in 2017. Some of the works remain permanently on the site and are open to the public.

== Location ==
The city of Suzu is located in Ishikawa Prefecture on the island of Honshū. With 15,000 inhabitants, Suzu is the smallest and most sparsely populated city on Honshu. Essentially, it is a cluster of coastal villages. Suzu is located at the tip of the Noto Peninsula, which juts into the Sea of Japan where warm and cold ocean currents meet. It is one of the most isolated places in Japan. The festival bills itself as the "foremost art festival at the furthest edge of the world". The landscape that could be described as "forgotten Japan" is a "somewhat surprising location" for a contemporary arts festival. Local residents offer tours and lectures that bridge the gap between contemporary art and the region's heritage.

The art installations are positioned not just throughout the city and surrounding area but in the surrounding coastal towns throughout the region, from the Sotoura to the Uchiura. The cultural landscape and biodiversity of these coastal landscapes are authentically preserved. The festival sets contemporary art installations against a backdrop of pristine nature, sea views and Satoyama mountain fields. Fishing, embroidery, but above all the production of salt is a typical craft of the area. The "Aenokoto ritual" (ritual among rice farmers) that is widespread here is registered as an intangible cultural heritage by UNESCO.

A bustling seaport for several hundred years, Suzu has already lost half of its population since 1954 in tribute to the modernization of the country. The city faces an aging society. In capitalism, every place runs the risk of being homogenized. Suzu could become a platform for the acceptance of individuality. Not least because of the Oku-Noto Triennale, the Noto region is now known as the "Festival Peninsula".

== Concept ==
The events aim to revitalize the city of Suzu and the region. With an art festival, the natural and cultural resources are used. It shows the cultural relationship between the archipelago and the Japanese continent. The festival offers visitors a new way to explore Cape Oku-Noto. Traditional culture of the region and contemporary art "enter into resonance".

Art festivals of this type have the ability to combat the depopulation of an area over time as the festival becomes increasingly integrated into the identity of the community. The event is intended to retain existing residents and also attract young people. That's why locals are included in the festival. The festival is closely planned with, and largely directed by, longtime residents. The city office organized the budgeting, infrastructure, volunteer work and educational talks with local leaders and residents. As part of a holistic, economic concept, the city is expanding the hotel, catering and transport sectors with local companies.

The festival brings together recognized national and international artists with local residents. The artists discover the place and its people. At first, the residents found it difficult to imagine their role in the festival. As venues were chosen and unique artworks for the region were created, local participation increased. At least a year before the opening, the residents began to regard the projects as their own, even if they did not always understand modern art. The residents lead bus tours, stamp visitors' passes, inform visitors. Older residents were trained to become leaders of the region. During the festival period, it was observed that the more involved the residents were, the more exhibition locations were in demand by the visitors. The residents experience the neglected places with new life.

Already after the first festival in 2017 it could be stated that the number of visitors in the region had increased and that the population was shown the potential of their resources.

== Organization ==
The organizer is the Oku-Noto Triennale Executive Committee. So far, the chairman of the board is Suzu Mayor Masuhiro Izumiya. The curators are Fram Kitagawa and Katsumi Asaba. Kitagawa, the festival's general director, has more than 20 years of experience. He already initiated the Echigo-Tsumari Art Triennale, which is also about connecting locals, environment and cultural history of a rural area with outsiders through creative, modern art. Also involved are representatives of the Japan Advanced Institute of Science and Technology / Soka University and the Kanazawa College of Art.

== Exhibition locations ==
The works of art are positioned in unused places in the city, in public halls, old schools or train station buildings, in the ruins of historic trading houses or an unused cinema. Railway tracks and a section of the Noto Railway Line (since 2005 closed due to a lack of passengers) were included as exhibition space. Former stations have been furnished with works of art. Some exhibits on land are difficult to access. For example, to see Tomoko Konoike's installation "Go Ashore" (2017) on the coast of Shakuzaki, the visitor has to walk a twenty-minute walk.

== 2017 ==
The first Oku-Noto Triennial took place from September 3, 2017, to October 22, 2017. When the exhibition manual was printed, the works of art had not yet been completed, so they had to be printed as sketches. The artists managed to express the history, peculiarities, charm and richness of each part of the city. In 2017, the exhibits were spread over 37 locations.

The 2015 business plan called the sum of 300 million yen, with an estimated 30,000 visitors. Estimates were surpassed with 71,260 visitors, total sales of 80 million yen and an estimated economic impact of 520 million yen. Nine artworks then remained permanently installed until February 2019, attracting a further 5,500 tourists.

=== Artists ===
29 parties from Japan and 10 from other countries took part.

- Adel Abdessemed (Algeria/ France)
- Allora & Calzadilla (Puerto Rico)
- Katsumi Asaba (Japan)
- Shoko Aso (Japan)
- Basurama Collective (Spain)
- Wu Chi-Tsung & Chen Shu-Chiang (Taiwan)
- Takafumi Fukasawa (Japan)
- Eat&Art Taro (Japan)
- Kodue Hibino (Japan)
- Gimhongsok (Korea)
- Yui Inoue (Japan)
- Naoki Ishikawa (Japan)
- Takahiro Iwasaki (Japan)
- Bunpei Kado (Japan)
- Kanazawa College of Art Project Team Suzupro (Japan)
- Tatsuo Kawaguchi (Japan)
- Maki Kijima (Japan)
- Tomoko Konoike (Japan)
- Aleksander Konstantinov (Russia)
- Masayoshi Koyama (Japan)
- Jianghua Liu (China)
- Rikuji Makabe (Japan)
- Kazuko Murao (Japan)
- Koji Nakase (Japan)
- Yoshitaka Nanjo (Japan)
- Noto Aburi Project (Japan)
- Eko Nugroho (Indonesia)
- Ondekoza (Japan)
- Ongoing Collective (Japan)
- Raqs Media Collective (India)
- Tobias Rehberger (Germany)
- Rikigosan (Japan)
- Masami Sakamaki (Japan)
- Hiraki Sawa (Japan)
- Chiharu Shiota (Japan/ Germany)
- Daisuke Takekawa (Japan)
- Nobuyuki Tanaka (Japan)
- Gyoko Yoshida & Kinoura Meeting (Japan)
- Ohji Yoshino (Japan)
- Toukuro Miyake & Waizumiryu Souke (Japan)

== 2020+ ==
Due to the COVID-19 pandemic, the festival planned for autumn 2020 was delayed for one year, taking place September 4 to October 24, 2021 and was extended until November 5, 2021. The date was deliberately planned to coincide with the local matsuri festival season. The title of the triennial was changed to "Oku-Noto Triennale 2020+" due to the time shift. The organizers announced that the artists were able to connect their works even more closely with the local character due to the longer preparation time. Works were presented that reflect the most modern perspectives. The Triennale was intended to bring people together again after the pandemic. Some artworks could be viewed until 2023.

=== Artists ===
Around 50 artists from 16 countries took part.

- Ayako Kuno (Japan)
- Can Tamura (USA/Japan)
- Aleksander Konstantinov (Russia)
- Carlos Amorales (Mexico)
- Carsten Nicolai (Germany)
- Chen Si (China)
- Chiharu Shiota (Japan/ Germany)
- Claire Healy and Sean Cordeiro (Australia)
- David Spriggs (Canada)
- Dylan Kwok (Hong Kong)
- Fernando Foglino (Uruguay)
- Hiraki Sawa (Japan/ England)
- Hiroshi Hara (Japan)
- Kamikuromaru: Koji Nakase, Daisuke Takekawa, Masami Sakamaki, Yukari Udo, Koji Doi (Japan)
- Katsumi Asaba (Japan)
- Kayako Nakashima (Japan)
- Keita Mori (Japan)
- Kenichi Obana (Japan)
- Kenichi Shikata (Japan)
- Kimsooja (Korea)
- Kodue Hibino (Japan)
- Liu Jianghua (China)
- Maki Kijima (Japan)
- Masahiro Hasunuma (Japan)
- Masaya Hashimoto (Japan)
- Michiko Nakatani (Japan)
- Mitsugu Sato (Japan)
- Miyuki Takenaka (Japan)
- Moon Kyungwon & Jeon Joonho (Korea)
- Motoi Yamamoto (Japan)
- Naoki Ishikawa (Japan)
- Nobuyuki Tanaka (Japan)
- Noe Aoki (Japan)
- OBI (Japan)
- Noto Aemono Project (Japan)
- Oscar Oiwa (Brazil)
- Raqs Media Collective (India)
- RIKIGOSAN (Japan)
- Saori Miyake (Japan)
- Satoshi Murakami (Japan)
- Simon Starling (England)
- Simon Vega (El Salvador)
- Subodh Gupta (India)
- SUZUPRO at Kanazawa College of Art (Japan)
- Takuma Imao (Japan)
- Tatsuo Kawaguchi (Japan)
- Teppei Kaneuji (Japan)
- Tobias Rehberger (Germany)
- Tu Wei Cheng (Taiwan)
- Umitaro Abe (Japan)
- World Dirt Association (Japan/ Singapore)
- Yoshitaka Nanjo (Japan)
- Yuki Okawa (Japan)
- Yukihisa Isobe (Japan)

== 2023 ==
The date for the event in 2023 is from September 2 to October 22.

== Publications ==
- Fram Kitagawa: Suzu 2017: Oku-Noto Triennale. Oku Noto International Art Festival Executive Committee, 2018, ISBN 978-4-7738-1804-8 C0070.
- Fram Kitagawa: Suzu 2020+: Oku-Noto Triennale. Oku Noto International Art Festival Executive Committee, 2022, ISBN 978-4-7738-2105-5 C0070.
