= Isobe =

Isobe is the name of

- Asaichi Isobe (磯部 浅一; 1905–1937), Lieutenant of the Imperial Japanese Army
- Eriko Isobe (磯辺 絵梨子; born 1977), Japanese volleyball player
- Hiroyuki Isobe (磯部 寛之; born 1982), Japanese musician, member of Alexandros
- Karin Isobe (礒部 花凜; born 1994), Japanese actress, voice actress, and singer
- Kōichi Isobe (磯部 晃一; born 1958), Lieutenant General of the Japan Ground Self-Defense Force
- Koichi Isobe (礒部 公一; born 1974), Japanese baseball player
- Rua Isobe (磯部 瑠紅; born 2007), Japanese member of the NGT48
- Sata Isobe (磯辺 サタ; 1944–2016), Japanese volleyball player
- Seiji Isobe (磯部 清次; born 1948), Japanese karate instructor
- Tsutomu Isobe (磯部 勉; born 1950), Japanese actor and voice actor
- Yukihisa Isobe (磯辺 行久; born 1935), Japanese artist

Isobe may refer to

- Isobe, Mie, town in the former Shima District, Mie Prefecture, Japan
- 7187 Isobe, main-belt-asteroid named after Syuzo Isobe

== See also ==
- Isobe Station (disambiguation)
