= 2007 Noto earthquake =

Earthquake in Japan

2007 Noto Peninsula earthquake
- 能登半島地震
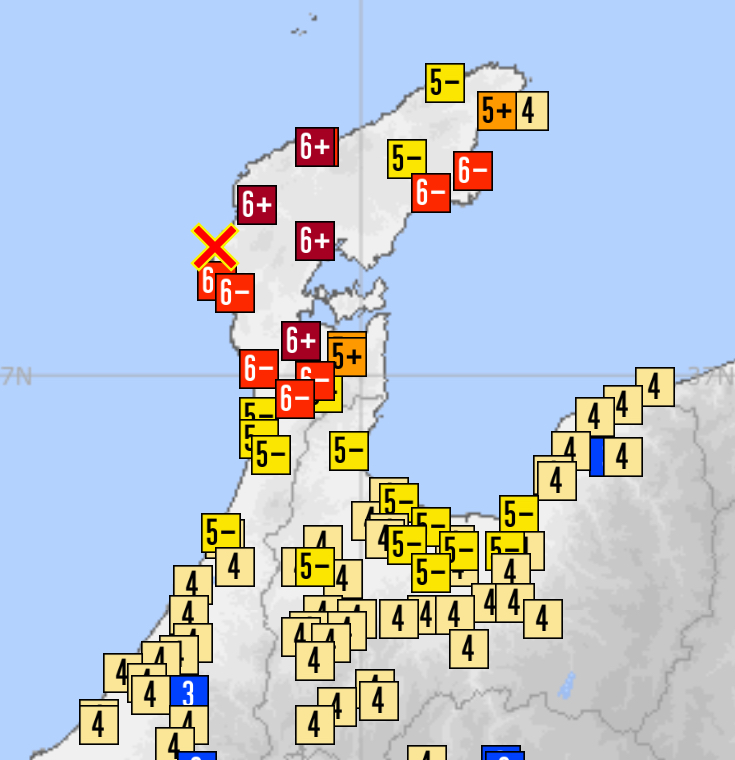

- Location within Ishikawa Prefecture
- UTC time: 2007-03-25 00:41:58
- ISC event: 11703278
- USGS-ANSS: ComCat
- Local date: March 25, 2007
- Local time: 9:41:58 JST (UTC+09:00)
- Duration: About 30 seconds
- Magnitude: 6.9 M_{j} (6.7 M_{w})
- Depth: 11 km (7 mi)
- Epicenter: 37.3°N 136.5°E
- Type: Intraplate, Oblique-slip
- Areas affected: Japan
- Max. intensity: JMA 6+ (MMI X)
- Peak acceleration: 0.96 g 945.4 Gal
- Tsunami: Up to 22 cm in Suzu
- Landslides: Yes
- Aftershocks: 500~
- Casualties: 1 dead, 356 injured

The 2007 Noto Peninsula earthquake (能登半島地震) occurred on March 25, 2007, in the Hokuriku region of Japan.

== Overview ==
At 9:41:58 a.m. on March 25, 2007, a magnitude 6.9 earthquake struck the Hokuriku region of Japan, near the Noto Peninsula. The earthquake shook the city of Wajima, the city of Nanao, and the town of Anamizu with a seismic intensity of 6+ on Japan's shindo scale. One death, in the city of Wajima, and at least 356 injuries have been reported.

== Geology ==
This earthquake was the result of oblique-slip faulting. According to the Geospatial Information Authority of Japan, the fault was 21 km long, 14 km wide and shifted 1.4 m. By using sound waves, the National Institute of Advanced Industrial Science and Technology also found a fault 18~ km long that is supposed to have caused this earthquake.

This earthquake was an intraplate earthquake that occurred within the Eurasia Plate, near the boundary with the North American plate. Noto Peninsula itself was created by pressure pushing up sediment from the south-east, and many folds and reverse faults are in the area. Some strike-slip faults are also found in the area. A 6.6 M_{j} earthquake also struck Ishikawa Prefecture on February 7, 1993.

Since the 1990s, the number of earthquakes with a magnitude of 6.0~ M_{j} are increasing. Some seismologists say that the seismic activity in West Japan is at its peak, and many earthquakes will occur, like the Great Hanshin earthquake. This earthquake is sometimes considered as one of those earthquakes.

Like the 2005 Fukuoka earthquake, it was announced that it "occurred in an area where seismic activity was relatively quiet", but earthquakes are possible anywhere in Japan and its surrounding areas. Also this earthquake's fault was out in sea, so it was not simulated in the seismic danger maps, since most of the faults simulated are inland faults. Some seismologists are trying to simulate these kind of earthquakes as well as inland earthquakes.

This type of earthquake was estimated to have occurred 1~2 times in the last 20,000 years (Frequency).

== Mainshock ==
The Japan Meteorological Agency placed the earthquake at 37.3°N, 136.5°E, at a depth of 11 km. It estimated the magnitude at 7.1, but later revised its estimate to 6.9. The earthquake had a maximum three-component vector sum peak ground acceleration of 1,304 cm/s^{2} (1.33 g). It occurred in a big seismic gap. Shaking in Wajima was very close to Shindo 7. It was the first time that Shindo 6- or more was observed in Ishikawa prefecture. It was also the 2nd time that Shindo 5- or more was observed in Toyama prefecture. Shaking was felt as far as Oshamanbe in the north, to Hiroshima in the west and Nahari in the south (Extent).

=== Geophysical effects ===
The earthquake moved Shika 25 cm southwest, and Anamizu 15 cm northwest. It also shifted an erosion terrace formed in the ice age and the sediment on top by 10 cm.

=== Intensity ===
Intensity	Prefecture	Location
6+	Ishikawa	Wajima, Nanao, Anamizu
6−	Ishikawa	Noto, Nakanoto, Shika
5+	Ishikawa	Suzu
5−	Niigata	Kariwa
5−	Toyama	Imizu, Oyabe, Himi, Funahashi, Namerikawa, Toyama
5−	Ishikawa	Kahoku, Hōdatsushimizu, Hakui

== Damage ==
According to the National Research Institute for Earth Science and Disaster Prevention, the pattern of the shaking was similar to the shaking in the Great Hanshin earthquake and the 1994 Northridge earthquake, called the "killer pulse": Pulse waves with a frequency of 1–2 seconds. This kind of shaking heavily damages buildings with around 2 floors. The shaking then got larger as it reached softer ground like alluvial plains, causing major damage.

- A 52-year-old woman died after a tōrō (stone lantern) collapsed and hit her head in Wajima.
- 25 track ballasts on the Noto Line were shifted after the earthquake.
- 22 cracks were found in the runway of Noto Airport. The runway was repaired by March 26.
- Some parts of the Noto Toll Road collapsed, making people leave their cars on the road after they evacuated. The roads were completely repaired by November 30.
- According to estimates about 110,000 houses had power outages, 13,250 houses had no water supply, and 260 houses' phones stopped working.
- Many other houses had no gas supply after the earthquake.
- Soil liquefaction was confirmed at the coasts near the epicenter and Himi port.
- Some people were trapped in elevators that stopped after the earthquake.

Ishikawa Prefecture (as of July 17, 2007)
	Casualties			Structural Damage			Evacuation Centers	Shindo
	Deaths	Serious Injuries	Minor Injuries	Collapsed	Half Collapsed	Partially Damaged		
Anamizu (Note: The seismometer that recorded the shaking in Anamizu reported shaking a little larger than it actually was, so the Shindo might have been 6-.)	0	3	36	72	94	2,197	3	6+
Wajima	1	46	69	503	1,057	9,984	6	6+
Nanao	0	17	110	50	252	6,493	0	6+
Noto	0	2	10	1	10	1,018	0	6-
Nakanoto	0	3	0	3	7	1,524	0	6-
Shika	0	10	27	14	217	3,385	1	6-
Suzu	0	0	3	2	13	769	0	5+
Kahoku	0	0	0	3	2	18	0	5-
Hōdatsushimizu	0	0	0	0	3	25	0	5-
Hakui	0	0	1	3	13	133	0	5-
Hakusan	0	0	0	0	0	1	0	4
Tsubata	0	0	1	0	0	2	0	4
Kaga	0	0	0	0	0	6	0	4
Total	1	81	257	649	1,655	24,959	10	Max 6+

Toyama Prefecture (as of March 28, 2007)
	Casualties		Shindo
	Serious Injuries	Minor Injuries	
Toyama	1	0	5-
Himi	0	1	5-
Oyabe	0	1	5-
Imizu	0	2	5-
Takaoka	0	6	4
Uozu	0	2	4
Total	1	12	Max 5-

== Effects ==
=== Evacuations ===
At least 1000 people in Wajima were evacuated to temporary shelters.

=== Transportation ===
The train lines that were stopped after the earthquake were:

- Hokuriku Main Line (Ōmi-Shiotsu Station – Naoetsu Station)
- Etsumi-Hoku Line
- Nanao Line
- Himi Line
- Jōhana Line
- Takayama Main Line (Toyama Station – Inotani Station)
- Ōito Line (Itoigawa Station – Minami-Otari Station)

Noto Airport temporarily closed due to the fact that 22 cracks were found in the runway.

A part of the Noto Toll Road temporarily closed since many parts of it collapsed. It re-opened on April 27.

== Tsunami ==
A tsunami advisory was immediately made for the Kaga coast and Noto coast, and a 22 cm wave hit shore about 30 minutes later.

== Aftershocks ==
More than 500 perceptible aftershocks were observed.

Aftershocks with Shindo 4 or more
Date (YYYY-MM-DD)	Time (UTC)	Magnitude	Shindo
2007-03-25	09:45:50	4.7 (M_{j})	4
2007-03-25	09:52:37	4.5 (M_{j})	4
2007-03-25	15:43:34	4.5 (M_{j})	4
2007-03-25	18:11:45	5.3 (M_{j})	5-
2007-03-26	07:16:36	5.3 (M_{j})	4
2007-03-26	14:46:35	4.8 (M_{j})	5-
2007-03-26	18:02:53	4.6 (M_{j})	4
2007-03-28	08:08:15	4.9 (M_{j})	5-
2007-03-28	13:05:31	4.7 (M_{j})	4
2007-04-06	15:18:18	4.3 (M_{j})	4
2007-05-02	20:44:38	4.7 (M_{j})	4
2007-06-11	03:45:14	5.0 (M_{j})	4
2008-01-26	04:33:00	4.8 (M_{j})	5-

Largest aftershocks are blue, and 4.8~ M_{j} earthquakes are light blue.

== Response ==
=== Cabinet Office ===
At 9:45, an emergency meeting for this earthquake was held at the Prime Minister's Official Residence. Government damage inspecting teams under command of Kensei Mizote were sent to the epicenter area from the 25th to the 26th.

=== Ishikawa Prefecture ===
At 10:45, an emergency disaster prevention meeting was held. 375 firefighters were summoned from Toyama Prefecture, Fukui Prefecture, Tokyo prefecture, Kyoto Prefecture, Osaka Prefecture, Shiga prefecture, and Hyōgo Prefecture. They were ordered to leave on 10:42 on the 26th, and left on 11:55.

=== Japan Self-Defense Forces ===
At 10:45, the Ministry of Defense held an emergency meeting. At 11:08, Masanori Tanimoto, the governor of Ishikawa Prefecture summoned 30 soldiers from the Ground forces from bases in Kanazawa, Sabae, Toyama, Kasugai, Nagoya, Hisai, and Takashima. Helicopters from bases in Wajima and Komatsu were also used. Ground forces, maritime forces, and air forces all went to investigate damage.

== Other ==
- Since Toyama Prefecture had no damaging earthquakes for 116 years since the 1891 Mino–Owari earthquake, most residents commonly believed that no earthquakes ever occurred in that area.
- About 6 months after the earthquake, rumors spread for a little while within the 13–18-year-old range of the residents of Toyama Prefecture that a massive earthquake would occur in Toyama Prefecture.
- An athletics competition that was to be held in Wajima was cancelled after the earthquake.

== See also ==
- List of earthquakes in 2007
- List of earthquakes in Japan
- 2023 Noto earthquake
- 2024 Noto earthquake

== Sources ==
- "Strong quake off Japan kills 1, injures scores". CNN. Associated Press. 2007-03-25. Archived from the original on 29 March 2007.
- Japan Meteorological Agency (in Japanese)
- "Earthquakes rock Pacific nations". BBC. 2007-03-25. Archived from the original on 28 March 2007.
- "6.9 Magnitude Earthquake Kills 1, Injures 170 in Japan". Fox News. Associated Press. 2007-03-25. Archived from the original on 29 March 2007.
- Hamada, Masanori; Aydan, Ömer; Sakamoto, Akio (2007). "A Quick Report on Noto Peninsula Earthquake on March 25, 2007" (PDF). Japan Society of Civil Engineers.
