= Can Tamura =

American artist (born 1970)

Can Tamura (Japanese: カン・タムラ; also known as John Wells) is an American artist, filmmaker and multimodal anthropologist based in Kanazawa, Japan.

== Biography ==
Tamura was born in 1970 in Dover, Delaware US. He earned his BA in film at Antioch College (USA), attending from 1988 to 1993 before moving to Japan in 1993. He earned his MA in Visual Anthropology, Media and Documentary Practices at the University of Münster (Germany).

== Works ==
=== Art and films ===
Working primarily in Japan, Turkey, and Mongolia, he makes experimental documentary films that explore the intersection between ethnographic film and contemporary art. His work uses analog and digital media including 16 mm film, analog video, and digital video.

Works include:

- The 24 Solar Terms of Echigo-Tsumari (2021–2022). Using methods of sensory-ethnography, Tamura traveled to the Echigo-Tsumari area 24 times in one year, once during each solar term, producing a series of 24 short films. The film series was produced for exhibition at the 8th Echigo-Tsumari Art Triennale 2022.
- Cinema Kamigo (2021). Tamura built a miniature movie theater in the former principal's office of the Kamigo Clove Theatre to exhibit the film The 24 Solar Terms of Echigo-Tsumari during the Echigo-Tsumari Art Triennale 2022.
- Suzu (2021). Working with both a 16 mm film camera and a digital video camera in the town of Suzu, Tamura made a sensory-ethnographic film about Suzu ware, a kind of ceramics production from medieval times that was revived in the late 1970s. The film was produced for exhibition at the Oku-Noto Triennale 2020+, where it was shown as two separate film and video installations, and a theatrical version of the combined 16mm and digital versions was screened at Ethnofest (Athens Ethnographic Film Festival) in Athens, Greece.
- Kanaiwa Mini Cinema Project–Experimental Version 金石ミニシネマプロジェクト〜実験版〜(2021). Satoshi Murakami, Can Tamura, and Ryo Uchida created a movie theater in the Kanaiwa Studio of the 21st Century Museum of Contemporary Art, Kanazawa and held screenings of their experimental short 16 mm film about the local area.
- Okinami (2019). Tamura documented life in the seaside community of Okinami in the town of Anamizu, including the annual Okinami Tairyo Festival. It was screened at the 2021 RAI Film Festival in London and BULAG art camp in Mongolia, 2021.

Tamura has also worked a cinematographer and editor of video artworks by other artists including:

- Shorinji temple (2018). Video installation, 1'30" by Song Dong.
- Living Migration (Busan–Kanazawa) (2018). Single-channel video, 2'13" by Can Tamura and Satoshi Murakami.
- Shop Sign Library (2018). Video and mixed media installation by Satoshi Murakami.

=== Writing ===
Tamura writes anthropological papers on vernacular photography in Japan, Suzu ware, sensory ethnography, and social memory/cultural memory.

Publications include:

- Tamura, Can. 2020. “The Ghost Scrolls of Manshu-in and Tokugen-in: A Shutter-Stopping Tale of Visual Culture, Photo Curses, and Recontextualization." Visual Anthropology Review 36 (2): 343–360.
- Tamura, Can. 2021. "Suzu-yaki to kankaku minzoku-shi 珠洲焼と感覚民族誌 [Suzu-ware and Sensory Ethnography]" in Tōsetsu 陶説 [Ceramics] No. 820, September.
- Wells, John (Can Tamura). 2023. "On Mimesis and Memory." In Alex Da Corte: Fresh Hell, edited by Kurosawa Hiromi, Nonaka Yumiko, and Ito Masatoshi, 140–143. Tokyo: My Book Service.
