= Hegurajima =

Island in the Sea of Japan

Coordinates: 37°51′5″N 136°55′7″E

Native name: Japanese: 舳倉島
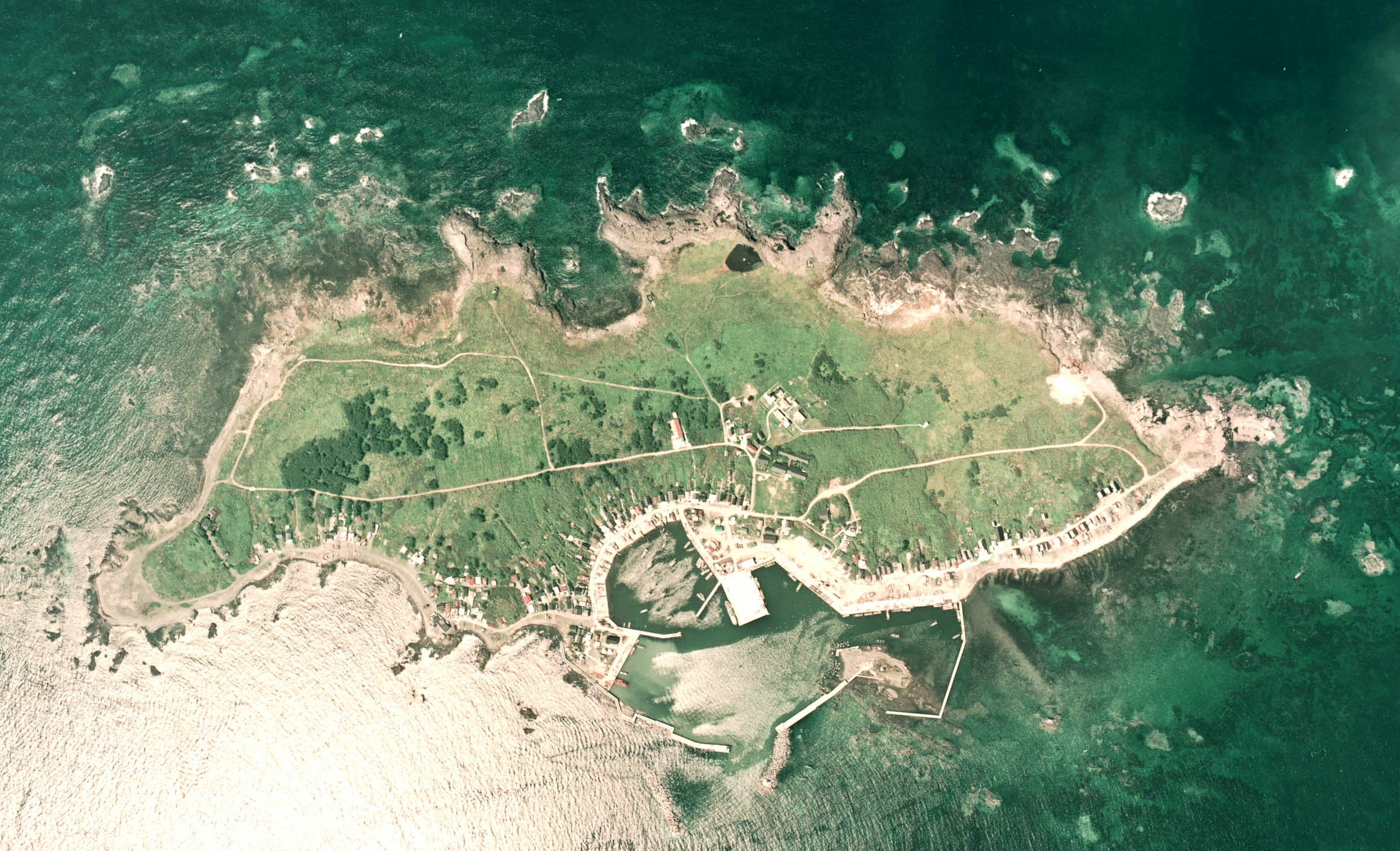
- View of Hegurajima in 1975

- Location within Japan

Geography
- Location: Sea of Japan
- Area: 0.55 km^{2} (0.21 sq mi)
- Coastline: 5 km (3.1 mi)
- Highest elevation: 12.4 m (40.7 ft)

Administration
- Japan
- Prefecture: Ishikawa
- City: Wajima

Demographics
- Population: 20-30
- Ethnic groups: Japanese

Hegurajima (舳倉島) (anglicised as Hegura or Hekura) is a small island located in the Sea of Japan at the far north of Ishikawa Prefecture, Japan. It lies approximately 47 km from the northern tip of Noto Peninsula, and is administratively part of Amamachi township within the city of Wajima. Hegurajima (literally helm-storehouse island) is approximately 2 km by 1 km in size and can easily be walked around in less than an hour.

The island is made of andesite, with steep cliffs on its northern side, and a sandy beach on it southern side, which is used as a shelter by fishermen. The island had a population of 164 in the year 2000 census, which dropped to 110 people in the 2010 census; however, the actual number of full-time residents is considerably less.

It is thought that Hegurajima corresponds to the island called Neko-no-Shima (Isle of the Cat) in a tale found in Konjaku Monogatari, an early 13th-century folktale collection.

== Notable facts ==
There is a lighthouse in the center of the island and a small minshuku. During the summer months female ama divers dive for abalone, Turbo sazae and Gelidiaceae for about 4–5 hours per day, following a long tradition that predates the use of wetsuits. There is a small fishing port, and a ferry runs to Wajima on the mainland. The island is a haven for migratory birds, and attracts tourists for birdwatching.

== Climate ==
Climate data for Hegurajima (2014−2020 normals)
Month	Jan	Feb	Mar	Apr	May	Jun	Jul	Aug	Sep	Oct	Nov	Dec	Year
Source: Japan Meteorological Agency
