= NTQ =

NTQ may refer to:

- Noto Airport (IATA: NTQ)
- Non-tax qualified, a long-term care insurance
