= Noto-Satoyama Kaidō =

Expressway in Ishikawa Prefecture, Japan

Noto-Satoyama Kaidō
- のと里山海道 (Noto-Satoyama Kaidō)

Route information
- Maintained by Ministry of Land, Infrastructure, Transport and Tourism
- Length: 83.0 km (51.6 mi)
- Existed: 1973–present
- Component highways: National Route 470 / Ishikawa Prefecture Routes 1 and 60

Major junctions
- South end: Chidoridai intersection Ishikawa Prefecture Route 60 in Uchinada
- National Route 249; Nōetsu Expressway
- North end: Noto-Satoyama Airport Interchange; Ishikawa Prefecture Route 303 in Wajima

Location
- Country: Japan

Highway system
- National highways of Japan; Expressways of Japan

The Noto-Satoyama Kaidō (のと里山海道) is a free national expressway in the Japanese prefecture of Ishikawa. As of July 2019, it connects the town Uchinada to the town Wajima, spanning nearly the entire Noto Peninsula from south to north. Much of the northern portion of the road runs concurrently with the Nōetsu Expressway. It is owned and operated by Ministry of Land, Infrastructure, Transport and Tourism (MLIT) and is signed as E41 and E86 under their "2016 Proposal for Realization of Expressway Numbering."

== History ==
The Noto-Satoyama Kaidō was first opened as the tolled Noto Beach Road (のと里山海道, Noto kaihin-dōro) between Takamatsu and Yanaida interchanges on 21 July 1973 by the Ishikawa Prefecture Toll Road Corporation. In August of the same year it was extended south to Shiroo Interchange. When the highway was extended north to Tokudaotsu Interchange in 1982, its name was changed to the Noto Toll Road (能登有料道路, Noto yūryōdōro).

The Noto Toll Road was damaged by the 2007 Noto earthquake, a magnitude 6.9 earthquake that closed sections of the road for six months.

The toll road was released from the Ishikawa Prefecture Toll Road Corporation on 1 April 2013 and all tolls were removed. When MLIT took control of the highway after its release by the Ishikawa Prefecture Toll Road Corporation, it was given its current name, the Noto-Satoyama Kaidō.

== Junction list ==
The entire expressway is in Ishikawa Prefecture. Exits are not numbered. PA= Parking area, SA= Service area

Location	km	mi	Exit	Name	Destinations	Notes
Through to Ishikawa Prefecture Route 60
Uchinada	0.0	0.0		Chidoridai	Ishikawa Prefecture Route 60 south	At-grade junction; southern terminus
Uchinada	2.4	1.5		Ōnebu	Ishikawa Prefecture Route 60 south – Hokuriku Expressway, Central Uchinada	Northbound entrance, southbound exit
Uchinada	4.4	2.7		Uchinada	Unnamed road	Northbound entrance, southbound exit
Kahoku	11.2	7.0		Shiroo	Ishikawa Prefecture Route 56 east	
Kahoku	16.7	10.4		Takamatsu	Unnamed road	
Kahoku	19.4	12.1		Kenritsu Kangodai	Unnamed road	
Kahoku	19.6	12.2	SA	Takamatsu		
Hōdatsushimizu	23.0	14.3		Komedashi	Unnamed road – National Route 249	
Hōdatsushimizu	26.1	16.2		Imahama	Chirihama Beach Driveway	
Hōdatsushimizu	28.7	17.8	PA	Shio		
Hakui	31.4	19.5		Chirihama	Ishikawa Prefecture Route 232 – Chirihama Beach Driveway	
Hakui	34.8	21.6		Yanaida	National Route 249 – Ishikawa Prefecture Route 2	
Shika	44.5	27.7		Chirihama	Ishikawa Prefecture Route 46	
Shika	47.7	29.6		Nishiyama	Ishikawa Prefecture Route 116	
Shika	48.3	30.0	PA	Nishiyama		
Shika/Nanao border	55.1	34.2		Tokudaotsu	Nōetsu Expressway south – Nanao	Southern end of Nōetsu Expressway and Ishikawa Prefecture Route 1 concurrency; northern end of E86 and Ishikawa Prefecture Route 60
Shika/Nanao border	56.3	35.0		Tokudaotsu	Ishikawa Prefecture Route 3	
Nanao	67.1	41.7		Yokota	Ishikawa Prefecture Route 23	
Anamizu	74.2	46.1	SA	Besshodake		
Anamizu	78.9	49.0		Koshinohara	Unnamed road	Northbound exit, southbound entrance
Anamizu	83.0	51.6		Anamizu	Ishikawa Prefecture Route 1 north – Anamizu, Monzen	Northern end of Ishikawa Prefecture Route 1 concurrency
Wajima	89.1	55.4		Noto-Satoyama Airport	Ishikawa Prefecture Route 303	At-grade junction; northern terminus
1.000 mi = 1.609 km; 1.000 km = 0.621 mi: Concurrency terminus; Incomplete access; Route transition
