= E86 =

E86 may refer to:

- European route E86
- Noto-Satoyama Kaidō, partly numbered as E86, in Japan
- E86 cluster bomb
- King's Indian Defence, Sämisch Variation, Encyclopaedia of Chess Openings code

== See also ==
- BMW Z4
