= 2023 Noto earthquake =

Earthquake in Japan

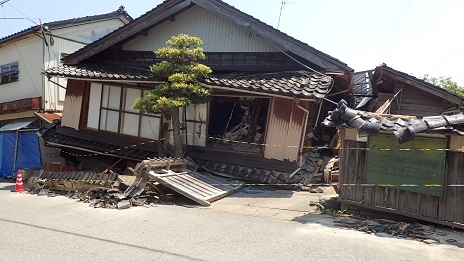
- Partially collapsed house in Suzu

- Location within Ishikawa Prefecture
- UTC time: 2023-05-05 05:42:04
- ISC event: 626093124
- USGS-ANSS: ComCat
- Local date: May 5, 2023
- Local time: 14:42:04 JST (UTC+9)
- Magnitude: 6.5 M_{JMA} 6.3 M_{w}
- Depth: 10 km (6 mi) (USGS)
- Epicenter: 37.548°N 137.299°E
- Fault: A previously unknown fault
- Type: Reverse
- Areas affected: Japan
- Max. intensity: JMA 6+–7 (MMI VIII)
- Tsunami: 10 cm (0.33 ft)
- Landslides: Yes
- Aftershocks: >300 (as of 21 October 2023); Largest is M_{w} 5.6
- Casualties: 1 dead, 49 injured

On 5 May 2023, a M_{JMA}6.5 or M_{w}6.3 earthquake struck off the coast of Ishikawa Prefecture, Japan. It was located 49 kilometres (30 miles) northeast of Anamizu, Hōsu District, with the town of Suzu closest to the epicenter.

== Tectonic setting ==
The northeastern tip of the Noto Peninsula has been subject to an earthquake swarm for over two years; the earthquake is one of the largest events in this swarm, surpassing a M_{JMA}5.4 event that took place in June 2022.

The earthquake was located in a zone of compressional deformation that is associated with the boundary between the Amur Plate and the Okhotsk microplate. In this area, the Okhotsk Plate is converging to the west-northwest towards the Amur Plate with a velocity of about 9 mm/yr and a maximum convergence rate of 24 mm/yr. The Amur and Okhotsk plates are relatively small plates that are located between the Pacific plate and the Eurasian plate. The Pacific plate converges west-northwest towards the Eurasian plate at around 90 mm/yr.

== Earthquake ==
The earthquake had a magnitude of M_{ww}6.2, M_{w}6.3 or M_{JMA}6.5 according to the United States Geological Survey, GCMT and Japan Meteorological Agency respectively. It struck at 14:42 JST at a depth of 10 kilometers. According to the JMA a maximum intensity of Shindo 6+ was recorded, while the USGS estimated a maximum Modified Mercalli intensity of VIII (Severe). However, according to a seismic intensity distribution map created by the National Research Institute for Earth Science and Disaster Resilience, Shindo 7 may have been recorded at Noroshi, Suzu. The earthquake had a focal mechanism corresponding to reverse faulting. A magnitude 5.6 aftershock struck the area at 21:58 JST, succeeded by another aftershock, at 23:18 JST of magnitude 4.5, along with over 50 other aftershocks hitting on Saturday, between magnitude 2 and 5.

Seismic intensities above Shindo 4
Intensity	Prefecture	Location
6+	Ishikawa	Suzu
5+	Ishikawa	Noto
5-	Ishikawa	Wajima
4	Ishikawa	Nanao, Anamizu, Kanazawa
4	Niigata	Jōetsu, Nagaoka
4	Toyama	Takaoka, Himi, Oyabe
4	Fukui	Fukui

== Damage ==
Thirty-eight houses collapsed, 263 others were partially destroyed and 1,855 others were damaged, including 1,825 in Suzu and 30 in Noto. One building each were also partially damaged in Wajima and Kanazawa. Two people were rescued from collapsed buildings. In Suzu, many buildings and structures were severely damaged, including a hotel, gravestones in a cemetery, a barn, a Shinto shrine and a police station. Landslides were also reported, causing the partial collapse or damage of mountainside houses. A man who fell from a ladder and suffered from cardiac arrest succumbed to his injuries later in hospital. At least 49 others were injured; 48 in Ishikawa and another in Toyama Prefecture. Among the injured were two people who fell unconscious, two people injured by collapsed houses, a minor who was hit by a falling wardrobe and another who suffered burns. Two of the injured were in serious condition and the rest received minor injuries. The Mitsukejima, which was previously affected by an intensity lower 6 earthquake the previous year, partially collapsed. Two elevators were automatically shut down in the Abeno Harukas skyscrapers in Osaka, leaving some stranded before being evacuated. Twenty homes had their electricity cut off in Suzu, with more than 120 losing water supply.

== Response ==
Due to the earthquake, around 1,600 people were evacuated. In Ishikawa Prefecture, 250 people took shelter in evacuation centers. The Japan Meteorological Agency warned the citizens of Ishikawa that strong aftershocks could occur for at least a week. The mayor of Suzu, issuing an earthquake emergency advisory and evacuating multiple households, said that the city would not be needing the help of Japan Self-Defense Forces due to the quake. Prime minister Fumio Kishida also stated that more measures will be taken in the following days, while also communicating with multiple officials, also to prevent other casualties in the event of a strong aftershock.

== See also ==
- List of earthquakes in 2023
- List of earthquakes in Japan
- 2007 Noto earthquake
- 2024 Noto earthquake
