= Mitsukejima =

Uninhabited island in Ishikawa, Japan

Native name: 見附島
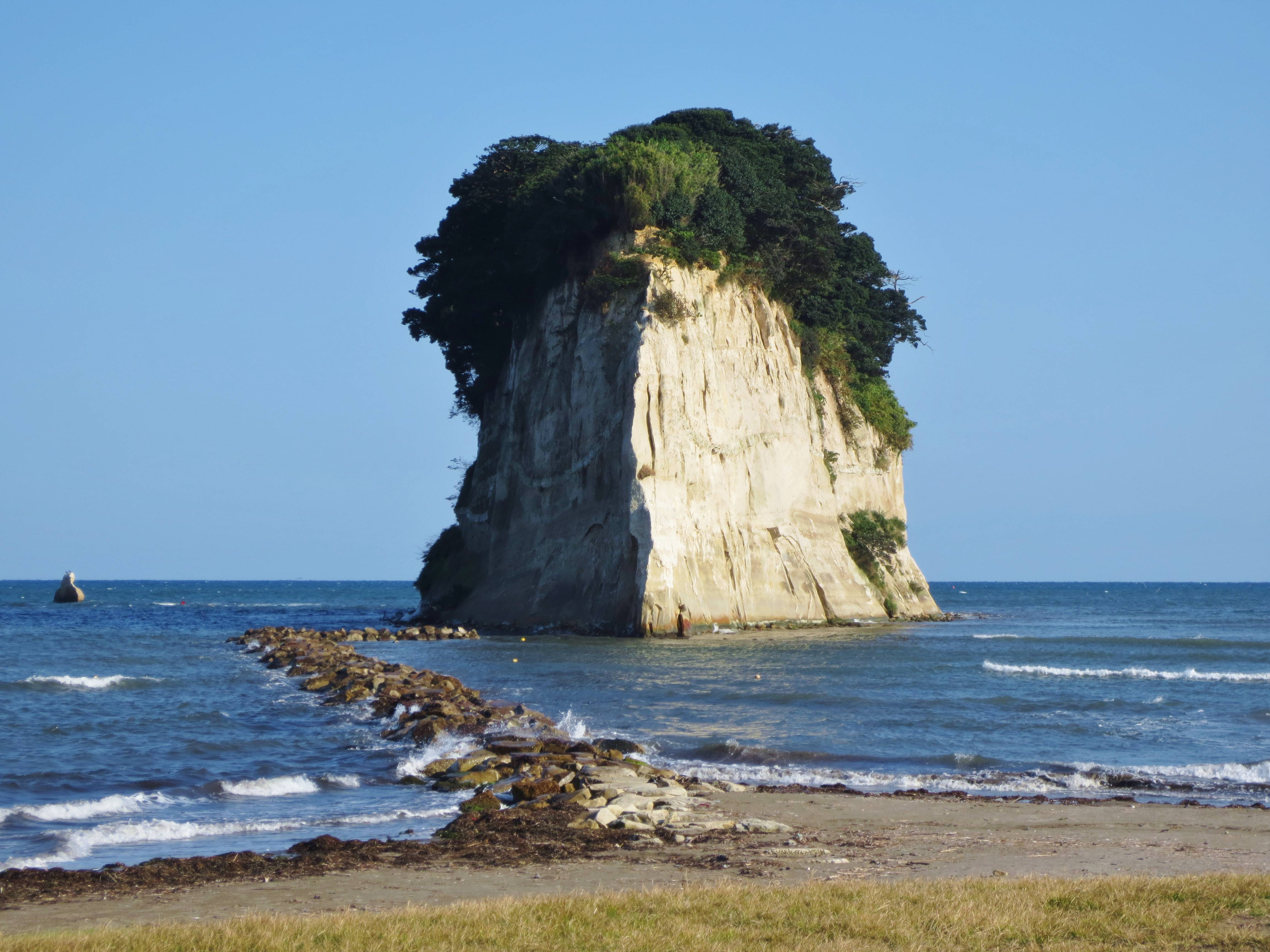
- Mitsukejima in 2014

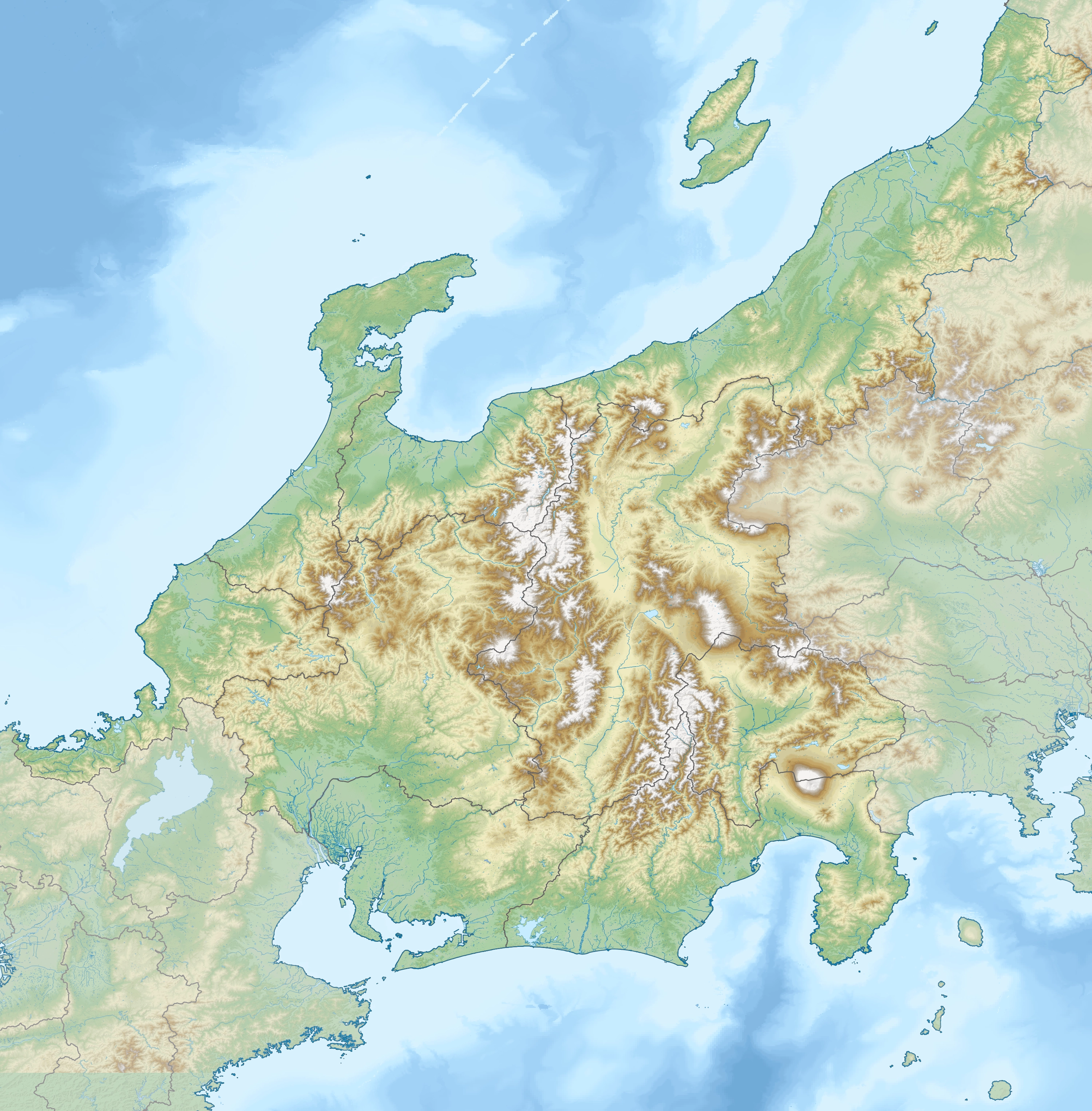
- Location within Japan Location within Chubu region Location within Ishikawa Prefecture

Geography
- Location: Sea of Japan
- Coordinates: 37°23′35″N 137°15′00″E
- Total islands: 1
- Length: 150 m (490 ft)
- Width: 30 m (100 ft)
- Highest elevation: 30 m (100 ft)

Administration
- Japan
- Prefecture: Ishikawa Prefecture
- City: Suzu City
- District: Takadate-cho

Demographics
- Population: 0

Mitsukejima (Japanese: 見附島) is an uninhabited island in Takadate-cho, Suzu, Ishikawa, Japan. Due to its shape, it is also known as Gunkanjima (軍艦島; Battleship Island), which is also the common name given to Hashima Island in Nagasaki Prefecture.

According to folklore, the island was given the name "Mitsukejima" by the Buddhist monk, scholar, and artist Kūkai, who was the first to discover the island while travelling from Sado Island.

Mitsukejima is approximately 150 metres long, 50 metres wide, and 30 metres above sea level. It is composed of Neogene-period diatomaceous earth, the raw materials commonly used for shichirin, a portable clay cooking stove which is a specialty product of Suzu. The top of the island is covered with Japanese black pine and Japanese knotweed. Mitsukejima is known as a scenic spot of the Noto Hantō Quasi-National Park, and attracts many tourists.

Following the 2024 Noto earthquake, Ishikawa prefecture plans to 3D scan the island and make a "virtual Mitsukejima" to appeal to tourists.

== Earthquake ==
- During the 2023 Noto earthquake, local observers reported landslides on the island, with Twitter users posting videos of the event.
- During the 2024 Noto earthquake, the island suffered from a major landslide, making it lose his famous battleship-like appearance.

== In popular culture ==
The island was featured in the manga Insomniacs After School by Makoto Ojiro and its adaptations.

== See also ==
- Noto Hantō Quasi-National Park
- Desert island
- List of islands
