= Suzu ware =

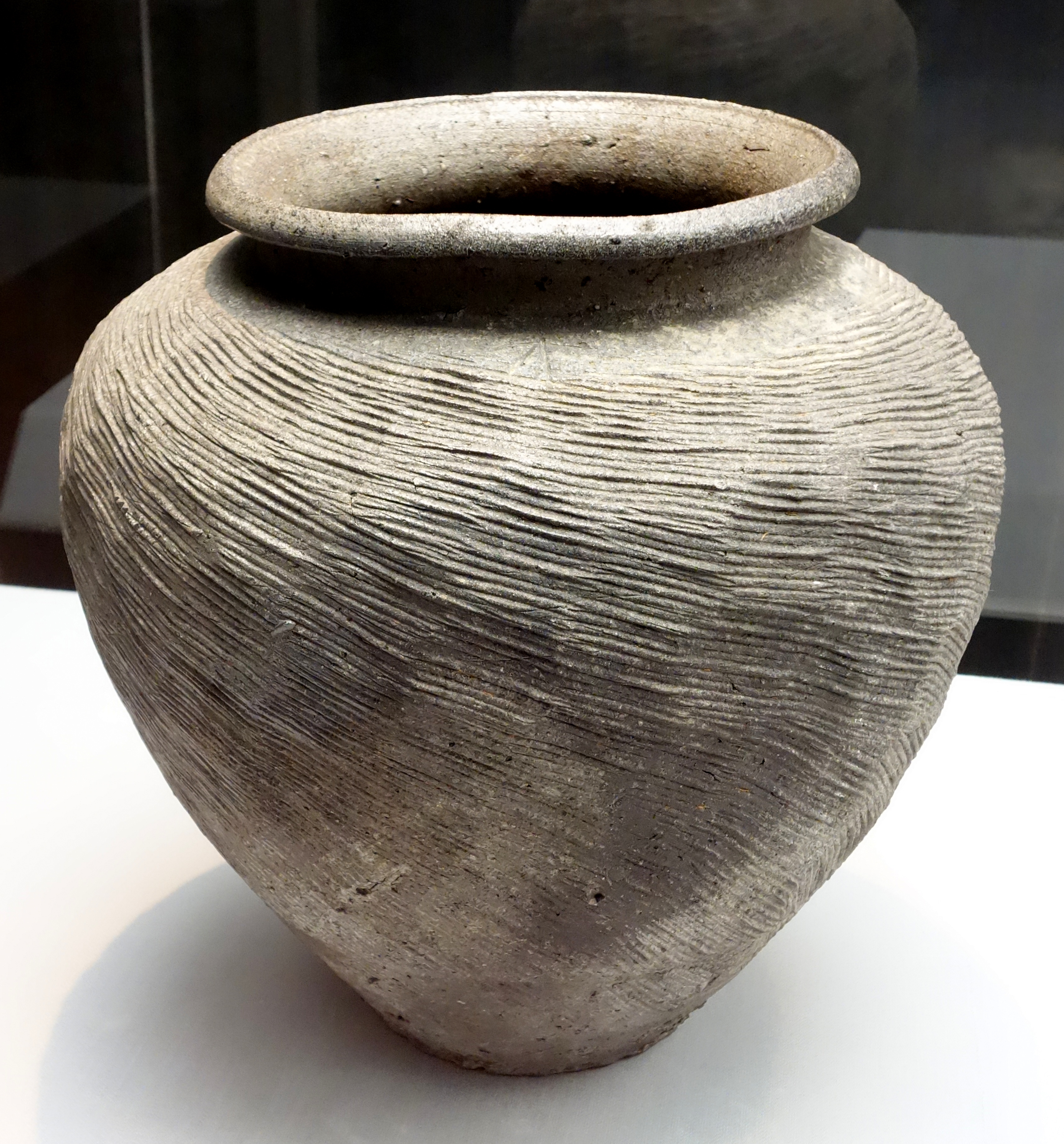
Suzu ware large jar, Heian period, 12th century, excavated from Sekiyama-jinja sutra mound, Myōkō, Niigata

Suzu ware (珠洲焼, Suzu-yaki) is a type of pre-modern Japanese pottery from the Noto Peninsula on the coast of Ishikawa prefecture, in the Hokuriku region of central Japan.

== History ==
The production of Suzu ware began in the 12th century, at the end of the Heian period (794–1185), although the style is a continuation of Sue ware, which flourished from the much earlier Kofun period. Suzu ware pottery has been found in many locations along the coast of the Sea of Japan as far north as Hokkaido, indicating that it was a common trade good for the coastal commerce. The Muromachi period was a golden age for Suzu ware, but it soon went into decline, and vanished by the time of the Sengoku period, unable to complete with large-scale production in areas such as Tokoname. In recent times, however, production of pottery along those traditional lines has resumed.

Suzu ware was fired in tunnel-shaped kilns built into hill slopes, at over 1100 degrees. Upon extinguishing the fire, the furnace opening and the flue were sealed to starve the kiln of oxygen, causing the iron contained in the clay to turn into a characteristic shade of dark gray. No glazing was used, but some works have a natural whitish glaze caused by ash present within the kiln. Suzu ware products were typically made for everyday use, typically storage pots, water jars, or ribbed mortars used for grating food.

Suzu city has a museum dedicated to exhibits of Suzu ware with detailed explanations of its history and production process.

== Suzu Pottery Kiln Sites ==
The Suzu Pottery Kiln Sites (珠洲陶器窯跡, Suzu-tōki kama ato) is a designated National Historic Site of Japan. covering 12 separate locations in what are now the cities of Suzu and Noto where the ruins of kilns used to make Suzu ware have been found. The sites are distributed over a 15 km east to west, by 20 km north to south region, and contain over 40 kilns and were built between the 12th and 15th centuries. Most are surface kilns, and only the latest couple are completely underground. Items produced included pots, bowls, mortars, sutra containers and Buddhist statues, and water containers.
