= Noto Hantō Quasi-National Park =

Quasi-national park in Ishikawa and Toyama prefecture, Japan

- 能登半島国定公園
- IUCN category V (protected landscape/seascape)
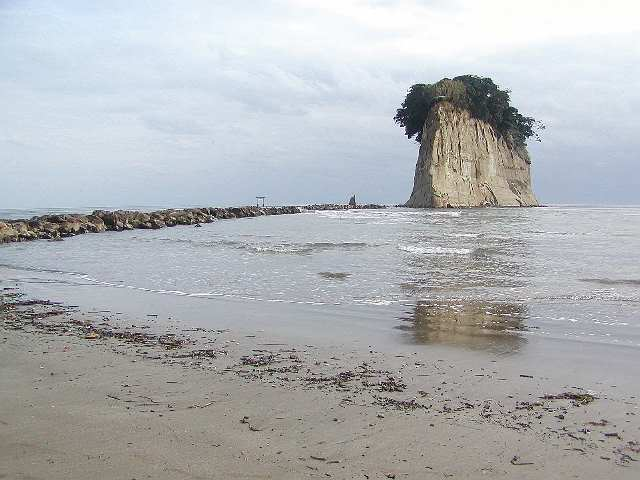
- Mitsukejima

- Location within Japan
- Location: Honshū, Japan
- Nearest city: Wajima
- Coordinates: 37°31′44″N 137°19′35″E
- Area: 9,672 hectares (37.34 sq mi)
- Established: May 1, 1968
- Governing body: Ishikawa and Toyama, prefectural governments

Noto Hantō Quasi-National Park (能登半島国定公園, Noto-hantō Kokutei Kōen) is a quasi-national park covering a portion of Noto Peninsula of Ishikawa Prefecture and Toyama Prefecture in Japan. It is rated a protected landscape (category V) according to the IUCN.

Noto Peninsula (能登半島, Noto Hantō) in the northern half of Ishikawa Prefecture, extends about 100 kilometers into the Sea of Japan. The peninsula is known for its coastal scenery and rural atmosphere. The Quasi-National Park covers much of the coastline, one side of which faces Toyama Bay and other side of which faces the Sea of Japan.

The borders of the park span the municipalities of Nanao, Suzu, Wajima, Hakui, Anamizu, Noto, Shika, Hōdatsushimizu and Nakanoto in Ishikawa Prefecture and Toyama and Himi in Toyama Prefecture.

Like all Quasi-National Parks of Japan, Noto Hantō Quasi-National Park is managed by the local prefectural governments.

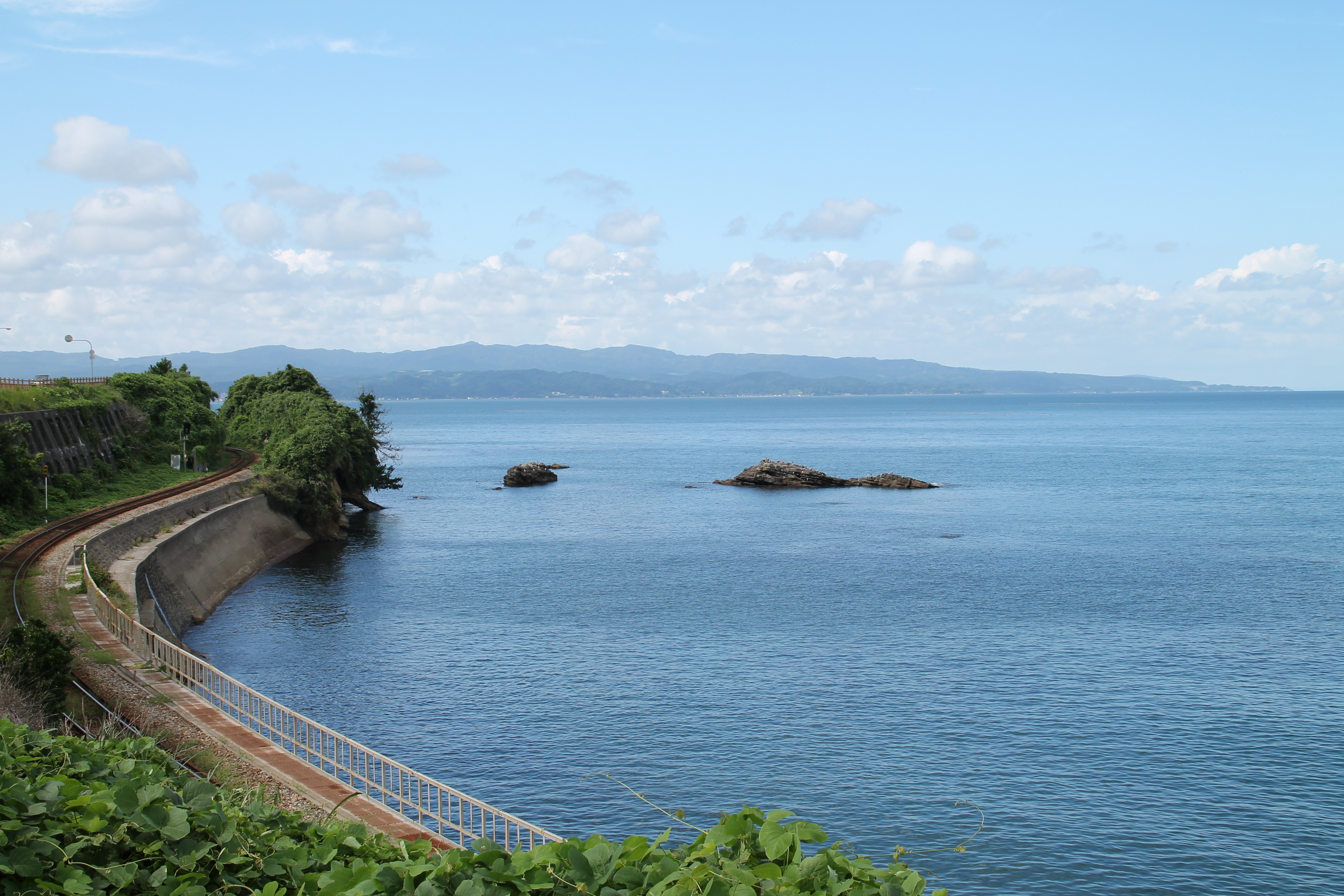
Amaharashi Coast

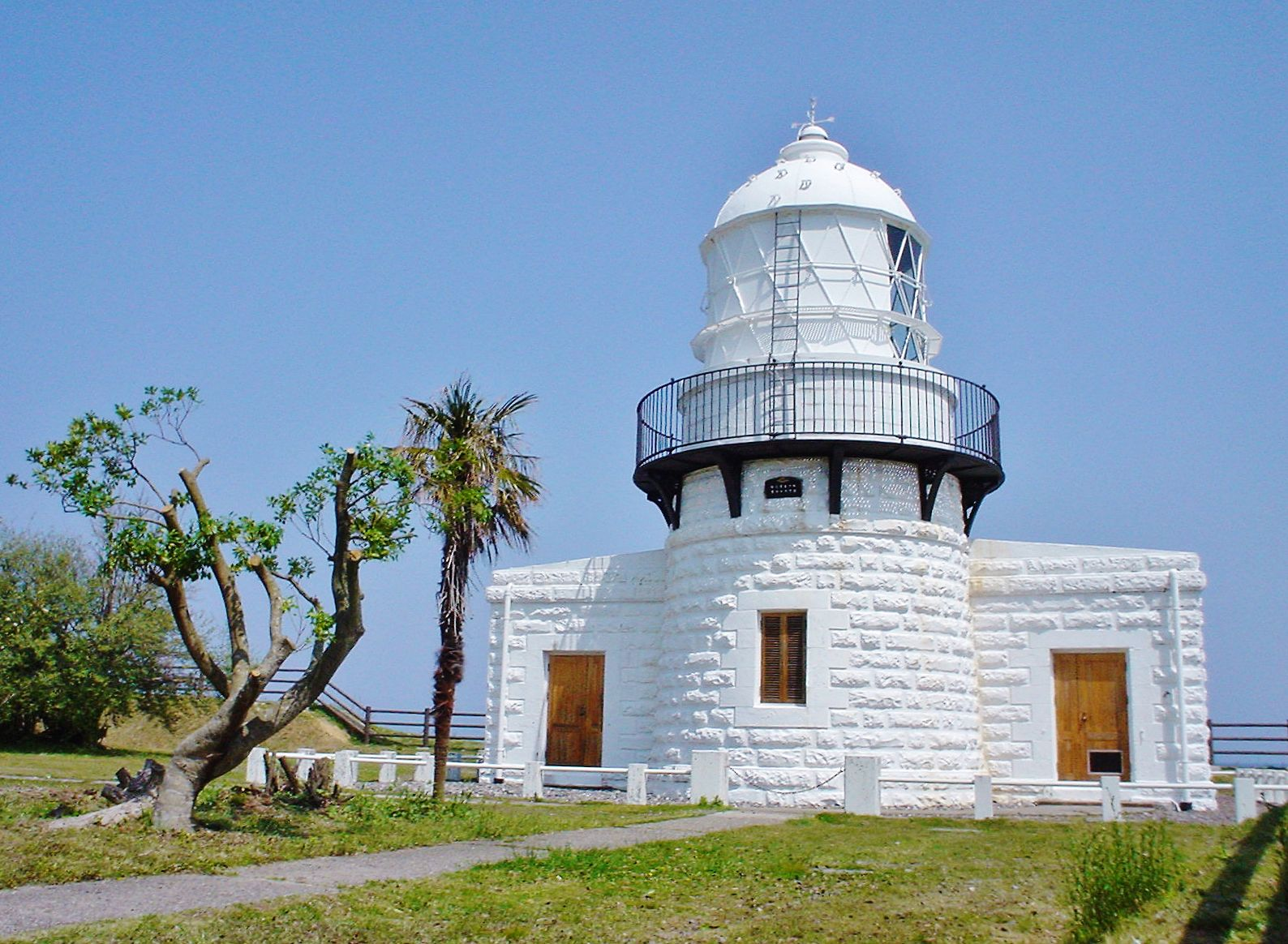
Rokkosaki Lighthouse

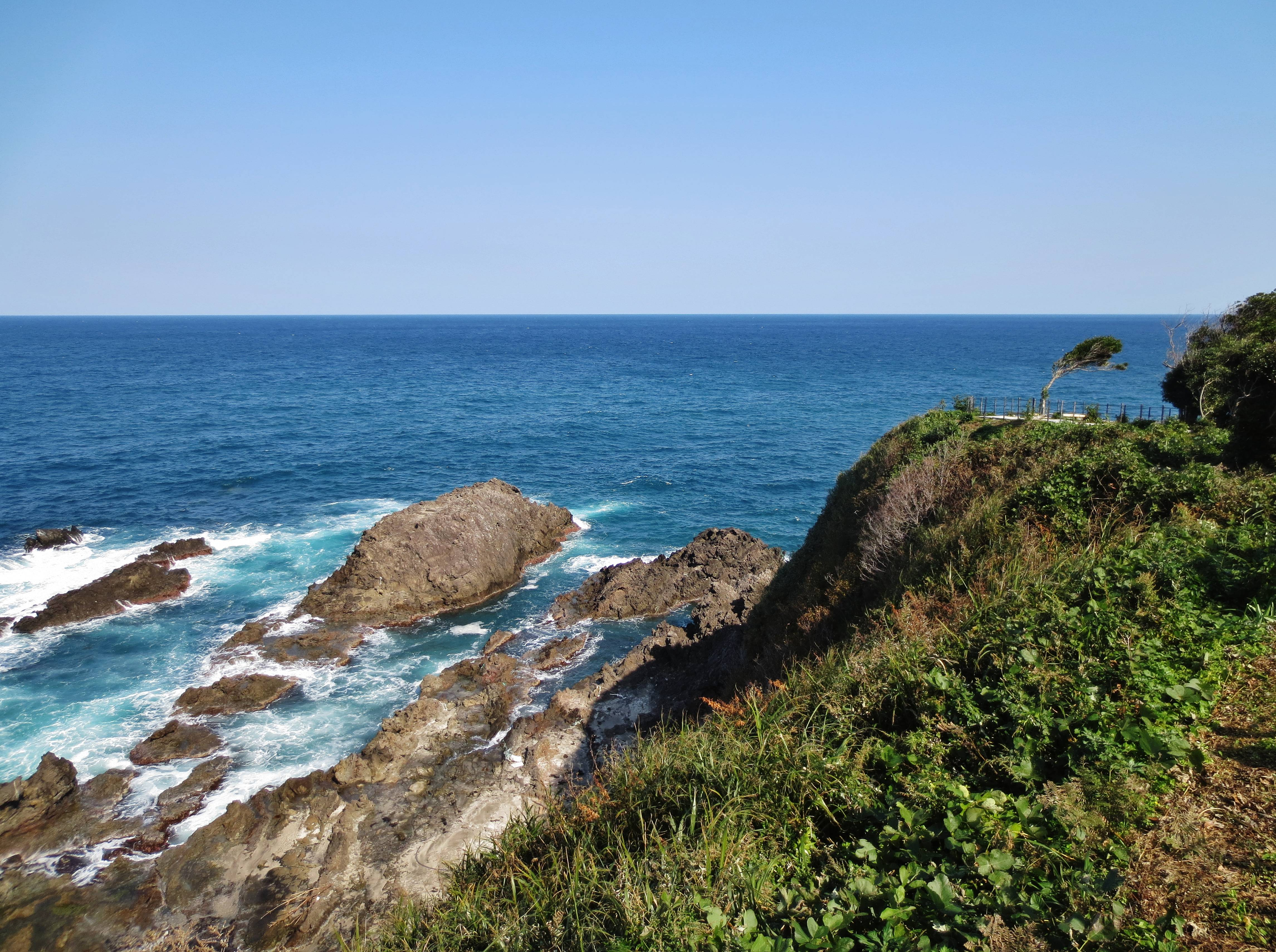
Cape Kongosaki

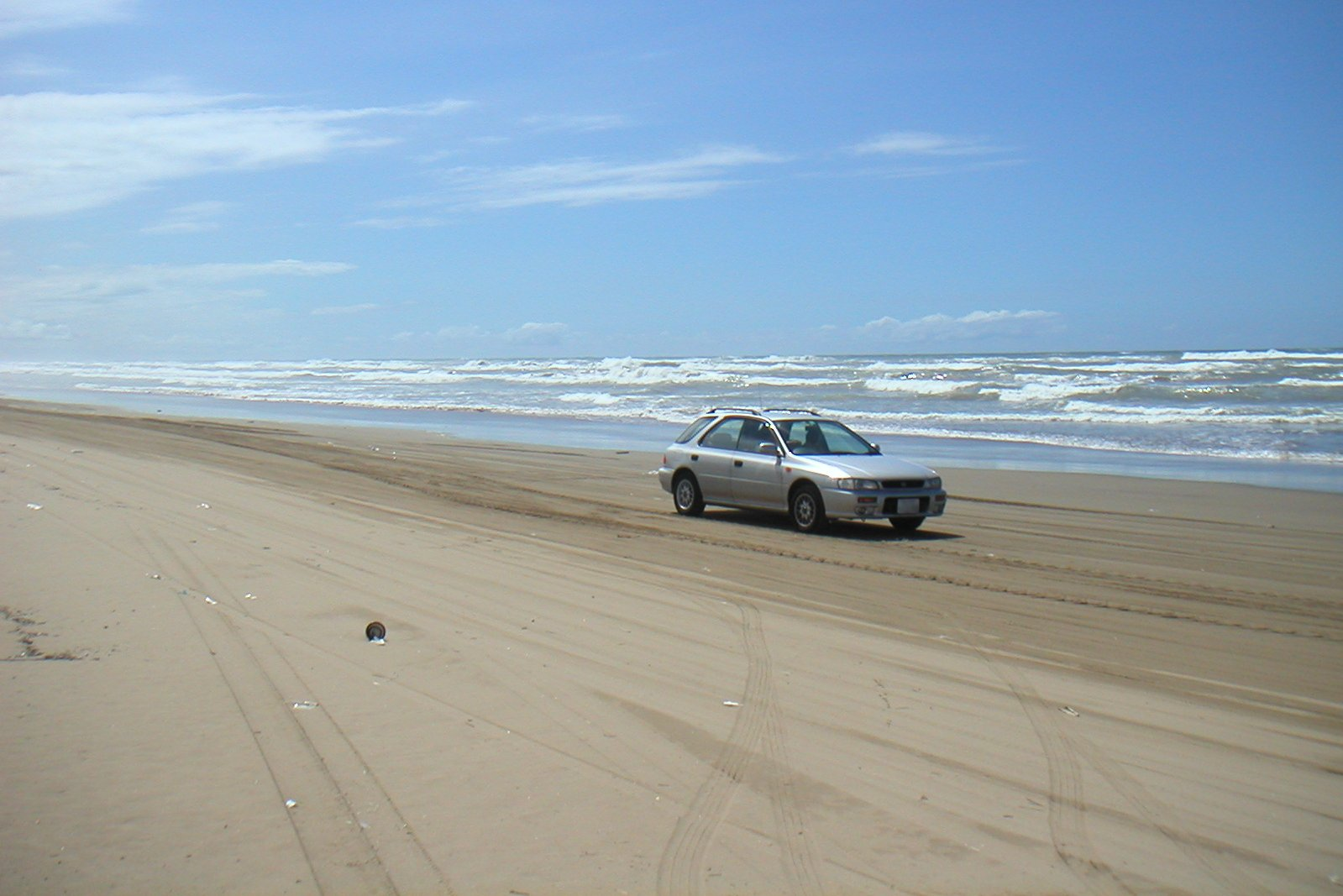
Chirihama Nagisa Driveway

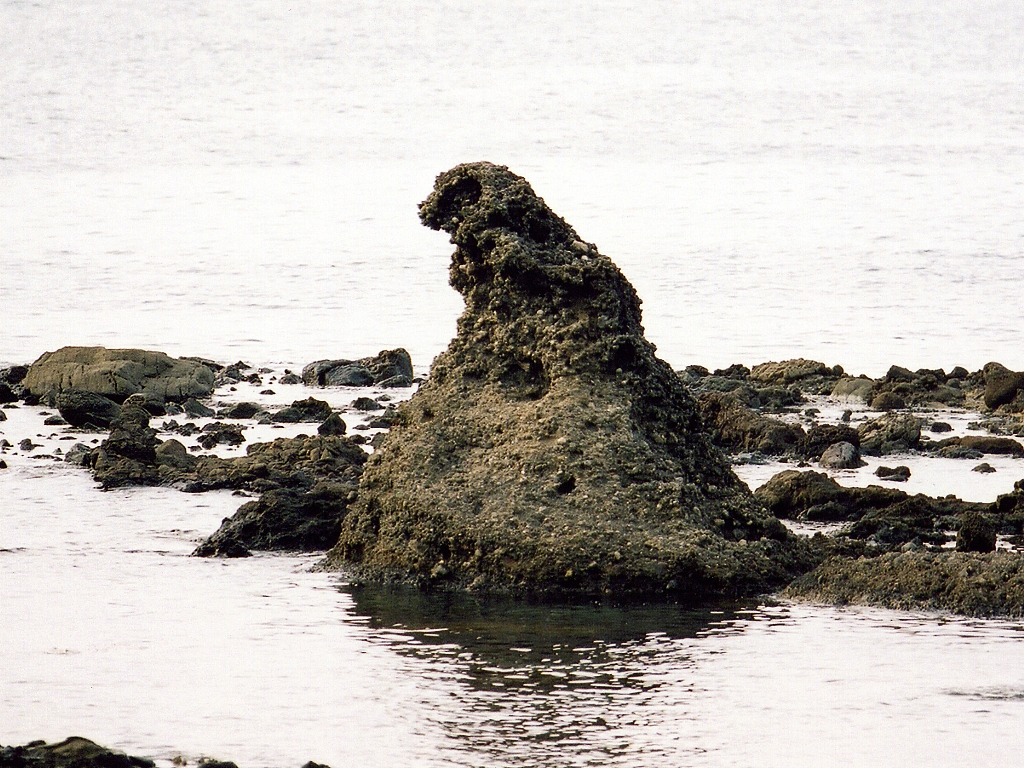
Godzilla Rock

== See also ==
- List of national parks of Japan
