= Isobe Station =

Isobe Station may refer to either of the following train stations in Japan:

- Isobe Station (Gunma) of JR East
- Isobe Station (Ishikawa) of Hokuriku Railway
- Shima-Isobe Station of Kintetsu
