= Suzu, Ishikawa =

Suzu 珠洲市
- City
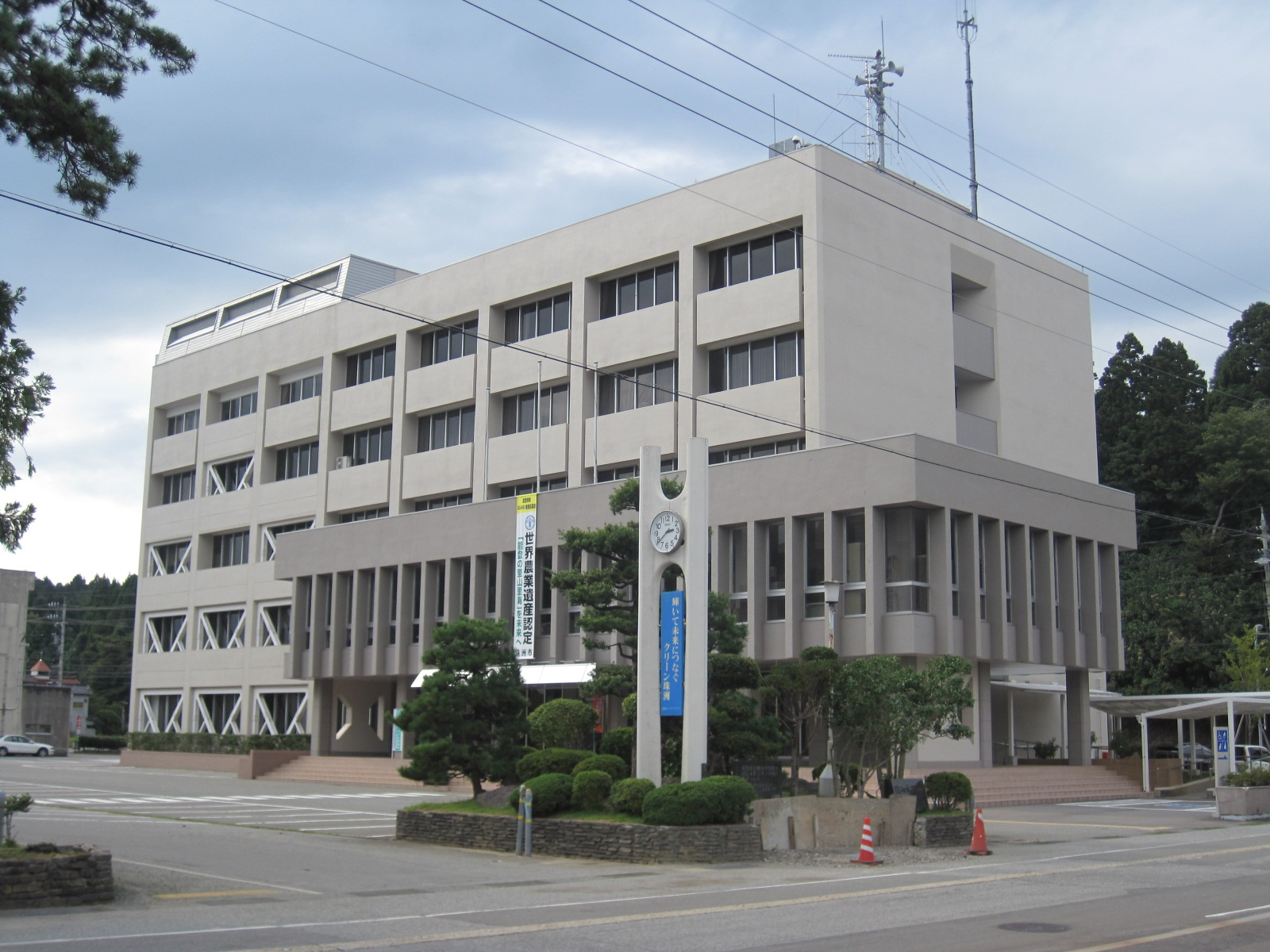
- Suzu City Hall

- Flag Seal

- Location of Suzu in Ishikawa Prefecture

- Coordinates: 37°26′10.8″N 137°15′37.7″E
- Country: Japan
- Region: Chūbu (Hokuriku)
- Prefecture: Ishikawa Prefecture
- First official recorded: 30 BC (official estimated)
- City settled: July 15, 1954

Government
  - Mayor: Izumiya Masuhiro (since June 2006)

Area
  - Total: 247.20 km^{2} (95.44 sq mi)

Population (2020)
  - Total: 12,929
  - Density: 52.302/km^{2} (135.46/sq mi)
- Time zone: UTC+9 (Japan Standard Time)
- Phone number: 0768-82-2222
- Address: 1-6-2, Uedomachi Kitagata, Suzu-shi, Ishikawa-ken 927–1295
- Climate: Cfa
- Website: www.city.suzu.lg.jp
- Symbols
- Bird: Japanese bush-warbler
- Flower: Camellia
- Tree: Japanese red pine

Suzu (珠洲市, Suzu-shi) is a city located in northern Ishikawa Prefecture, Japan. As of 31 March 2021, the city had an estimated population of 13,531 in 6013 households, and a population density of 54.6 persons per km^{2}. The total area of the city was 247.20 square kilometres (95.44 sq mi).

== Etymology ==
Suzu is thought to have been named after Suzu Shrine, an ancient Shinto shrine located in the Awazu area of the city. The name "Suzu" appears in Nara period records; however, the kanji for Suzu (珠洲) is not thought to have been in use until the early Wadō era (713 AD). There is also the theory that the name originates from the Ainu language, as with several other place names in the Noto area.

== Geography ==
Suzu occupies the northeastern tip of the Noto Peninsula and is bordered by the Sea of Japan on three sides. Parts of the city are within the borders of the Noto Hantō Quasi-National Park.

=== Neighbouring municipalities ===
- Ishikawa Prefecture
  - Noto
  - Wajima

=== Climate ===
Suzu has a humid subtropical climate (Köppen Cfa) characterized by mild summers and cold winters with heavy snowfall. The average annual temperature in Suzu is 13.0 °C. The average annual rainfall is 2234 mm with September as the wettest month. The temperatures are highest on average in August, at around 25.4 °C, and lowest in January, at around 2.4 °C.

Climate data for Suzu (1991−2020 normals, extremes 1978−present)
Month	Jan	Feb	Mar	Apr	May	Jun	Jul	Aug	Sep	Oct	Nov	Dec	Year
Record high °C (°F)	17.0 (62.6)	19.4 (66.9)	24.5 (76.1)	29.3 (84.7)	31.6 (88.9)	34.6 (94.3)	36.1 (97.0)	38.2 (100.8)	37.1 (98.8)	30.4 (86.7)	26.9 (80.4)	20.0 (68.0)	38.2 (100.8)
Mean daily maximum °C (°F)	6.0 (42.8)	6.5 (43.7)	10.2 (50.4)	15.7 (60.3)	21.0 (69.8)	24.3 (75.7)	28.3 (82.9)	30.1 (86.2)	26.1 (79.0)	20.7 (69.3)	14.9 (58.8)	9.0 (48.2)	17.7 (63.9)
Daily mean °C (°F)	2.8 (37.0)	2.8 (37.0)	5.5 (41.9)	10.4 (50.7)	15.7 (60.3)	19.8 (67.6)	24.1 (75.4)	25.5 (77.9)	21.6 (70.9)	15.8 (60.4)	10.3 (50.5)	5.3 (41.5)	13.3 (55.9)
Mean daily minimum °C (°F)	−0.4 (31.3)	−0.9 (30.4)	0.8 (33.4)	4.9 (40.8)	10.7 (51.3)	15.8 (60.4)	20.6 (69.1)	21.6 (70.9)	17.6 (63.7)	11.2 (52.2)	5.7 (42.3)	1.6 (34.9)	9.1 (48.4)
Record low °C (°F)	−10.4 (13.3)	−9.1 (15.6)	−5.3 (22.5)	−3.0 (26.6)	1.6 (34.9)	7.5 (45.5)	11.7 (53.1)	13.7 (56.7)	8.6 (47.5)	1.0 (33.8)	−1.1 (30.0)	−7.5 (18.5)	−10.4 (13.3)
Average precipitation mm (inches)	226.0 (8.90)	140.6 (5.54)	129.2 (5.09)	106.6 (4.20)	98.4 (3.87)	141.7 (5.58)	193.9 (7.63)	165.7 (6.52)	184.9 (7.28)	152.7 (6.01)	200.5 (7.89)	279.2 (10.99)	2,019.3 (79.50)
Average snowfall cm (inches)	89 (35)	67 (26)	13 (5.1)	0 (0)	0 (0)	0 (0)	0 (0)	0 (0)	0 (0)	0 (0)	0 (0)	35 (14)	202 (80)
Average precipitation days (≥ 1.0 mm)	24.5	19.4	16.6	11.6	9.8	9.5	11.7	9.6	12.2	13.1	18.0	23.9	179.9
Average snowy days (≥ 3 cm)	9.6	7.8	1.4	0.1	0	0	0	0	0	0	0	4.4	23.3
Mean monthly sunshine hours	62.0	90.1	149.0	195.6	218.6	172.6	162.4	208.2	150.8	153.3	108.3	69.2	1,740.1
Source: Japan Meteorological Agency

== Demographics ==
Per Japanese census data, the population of Suzu has declined steadily over the past 50 years.

Historical population
Year	Pop.	±%
1960	35,827	—
1970	29,224	−18.4%
1980	27,351	−6.4%
1990	23,471	−14.2%
2000	19,852	−15.4%
2010	16,300	−17.9%
2020	12,929	−20.7%

== History ==
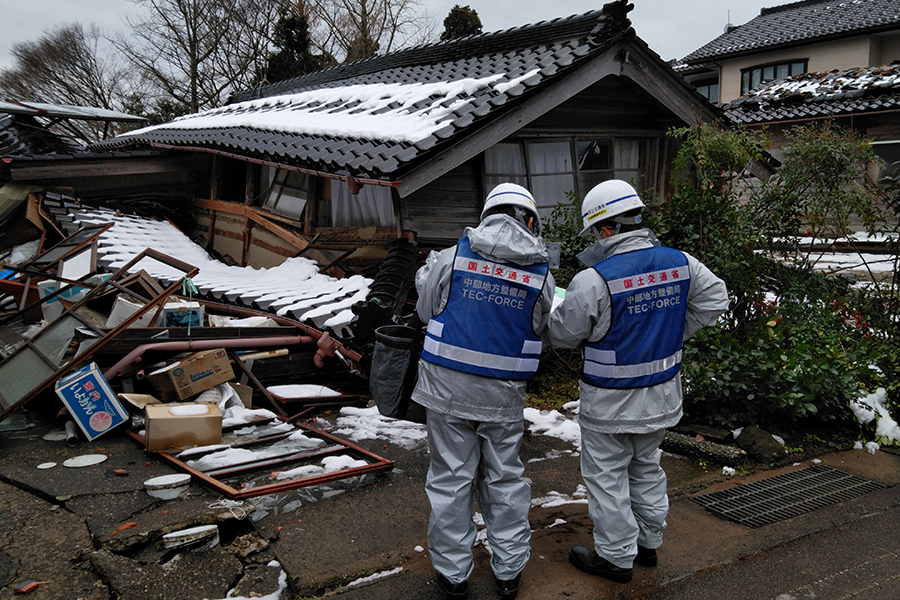
2024 Noto earthquake damage in Suzu

In ancient times, Suzu prospered as a gateway for trade by sea, establishing connections with places such as Izumo, Sado and Ezo. In turn, Suzu was introduced to ironware culture from a considerably early period in the Izumo era, and even gained crucial agricultural influence and knowledge to develop an agricultural society. In fact, it is thought that such ancient Noto culture originated and spread outwards from the tip of the Noto Peninsula.

In the second year of the Yōrō (718), Noto Province consisting of the 4 districts of Suzu, Fugeshi, Hakui and Noto was established. For a short period of time, the land was claimed as part of Etchū Province. During this period the famous Ōtomo no Yakamochi recited a poem about the picturesque scenery of Suzu Bay, which would later be included in the famous poetry anthology Man'yōshū. Later in the Kōji period (1143), Noto Provincial Governor Minamoto no Toshikane established Wakayama shōen which grew to become the largest estate in Noto, expanding territory to take over the majority of land in Suzu. Around this time, production of Suzu ware began, which was exported as far as Hokkaido. The area was also noted from ancient times for the production of salt.

During the Sengoku period (1467–1568), the area was contested between the Hatakeyama clan, Uesugi clan and Maeda clan, with the area becoming part of Kaga Domain under the Edo-period Tokugawa shogunate. Following the Meiji Restoration, the area was organised into one town (Iida) and 14 villages in 1889. These municipalities merged on 15 July 1954 to form the city of Suzu.

Since 2020, the city has been hit by an earthquake swarm. A M_{JMA}5.4 earthquake in June 2022 injured seven people, damaged a temple and shattered windows. In May 2023, a M_{JMA}6.5 earthquake hit the city. One person died, 47 others were injured, 38 houses collapsed, 263 were partially destroyed and 1,825 others were damaged in Suzu, over one-third of the city's housing stock. At the beginning of 2024, another earthquake, measuring M_{JMA}7.6, hit close to Suzu, causing 146 deaths in the city (including 49 indirectly) and destroying or severely damaging 5,916 of the city's 6,000 houses.

== Government ==
Suzu has a mayor-council form of government with a directly elected mayor and a unicameral city legislature of 14 members.

== Economy ==
=== Industries ===
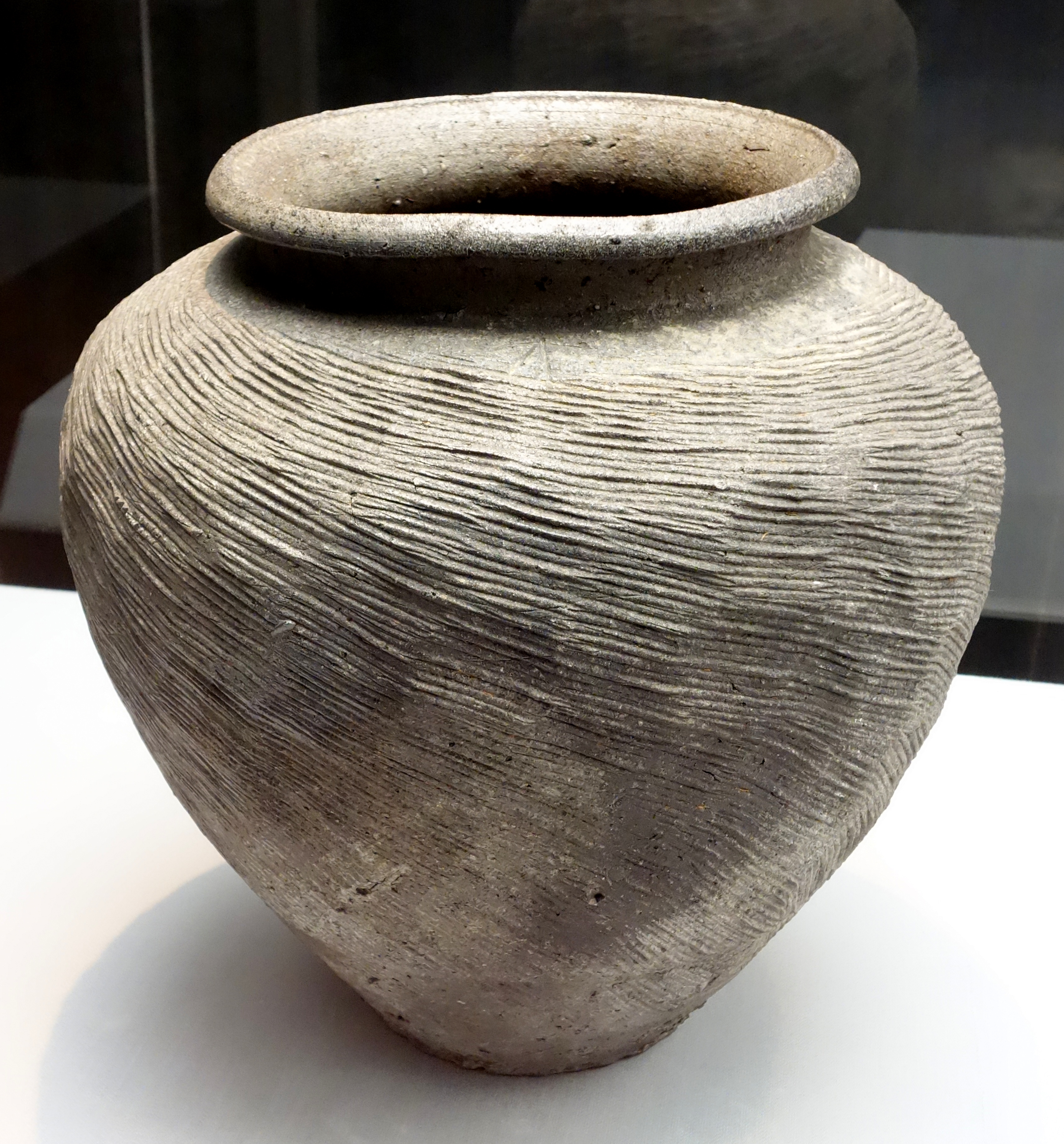
Suzu ware large jar, Heian period, 12th century, excavated from Sekiyama-jinja sutra mound, Myōkō, Niigata

- Agriculture: wet-land rice, Matsutake mushrooms, charcoal, and other crops
- Ceramics: portable stoves called shichirin and Suzu ware are the chief ceramic goods produced in the city. Also, diatomaceous earth is found almost anywhere within the city limits, and it has been used for ceramics since the Edo period.
- Commercial fishing: processing of marine goods
- Livestock: Noto Beef, a regionally renowned brand
- Sake: there are several sake producers in the area, including the Sougen Sake Brewery.
- Salt: salt is still manufactured traditionally with evaporation ponds, particularly through the Agehama method of artificially flooded saltpans.

More recently, Suzu has become known for its production of sawtooth oak charcoal (クヌギ炭, kunugi-zumi) for use in the Japanese tea ceremony.

== Education ==
Suzu has seven public elementary schools and four middle schools operated by the city government, and one public high school operated by the Ishikawa Prefectural Board of Education. The prefectural also operates one special education school.

== Transportation ==
Noto Railway's Noto Line ran from Anamizu Station to Suzu's Takojima Station until April 2005, when the line was permanently closed. Today, the city does not have any passenger railway service.

=== Highway ===
National Route 249

=== Air ===
The city does not have its own airport with the nearest airport is served by Noto Airport which is located 35 km west of Suzu. The airport provides daily flights to Tokyo - Haneda which is operated by ANA Airways.

== Mass media ==
=== Newspapers ===
- Hokuriku Chunichi Shimbun (Chunichi Shimbun Co.), Suzu Correspondence Division
- Hokkoku Shimbun, Suzu Branch Office

=== Cable television ===
- Nouetsu Cablenet

== Sister cities ==
- Pelotas, Brazil, since September 1963

== Local attractions ==
=== Places ===
- Godzilla Rock
- Mitsukejima, also called "Battleship Rock"
- Rokkozaki Lighthouse
- Suzu Shrine
- Suzu-yaki Museum

=== Festivals ===
- Iida-machi Toroyama Festival (established by the city as an important intangible folk culture asset in 1996)
- Houryuu Tanabata Kiriko Festival – Held on the first Saturday of August in Ukai, Houryuu-machi. A 14-meter-tall (46 ft) kiriko is carried by a group of young people on their shoulders around the Ukai area in Houryuu-machi. Although the kiriko in Jike, Misaki-machi, is recognized as being the biggest in Japan, the kiriko used in this festival is the largest among kiriko that are carried on the shoulders. In the final stages of the festival, with fireworks in the background, the kiriko is pushed towards the sea and the participants do boisterous dance in the sea around pine torches.
- Oku-Noto Triennale – Contemporary art festival held every three years

== Mascot ==
Mitsuketarou, the city's mascot

Suzu's mascot is Mitsuketarou (みつけたろう), a fairy from Mitsukejima. Its goal is to promote Suzu to the rest of the country and the world. It became the mascot on 7 November 2011.
