= Wajima, Ishikawa =

Wajima 輪島市
- City
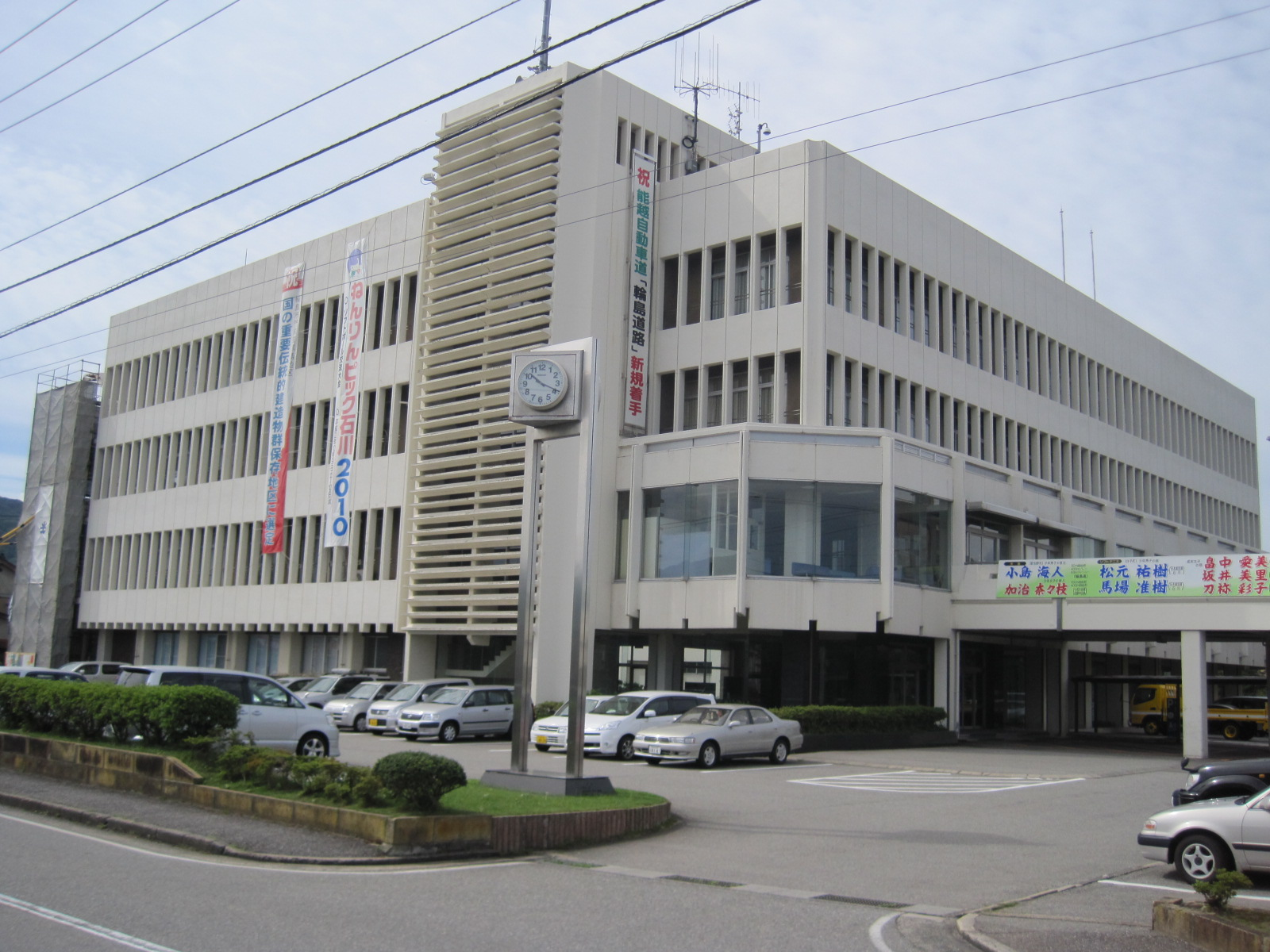
- Wajima City Hall

- Flag Emblem

- Location of Wajima in Ishikawa Prefecture

- Coordinates: 37°23′26″N 136°53′57″E
- Country: Japan
- Region: Chūbu (Hokuriku)
- Prefecture: Ishikawa Prefecture

Government
  - - Mayor: Shigeru Sakaguchi (from March 2022)

Area
  - Total: 426.32 km^{2} (164.60 sq mi)

Population (2020 (Census))
  - Total: 24,608
  - Density: 57.722/km^{2} (149.50/sq mi)
- Time zone: UTC+9 (Japan Standard Time)
- Phone number: 0768-22-2211
- Address: 2-29 Futatsuyamachi, Wajima-shi, Ishikawa-ken 928-8525
- Climate: Cfa
- Website: www.city.wajima.ishikawa.jp
- Symbols
- Flower: Primula farinosa subsp. modesta

Wajima (輪島市, Wajima-shi) is a city located in Ishikawa Prefecture, Japan. As of 31 January 2018, the city had an estimated population of 27,698 in 12,768 households, and a population density of 65 persons per km^{2}. The total area of the city was 426.32 square kilometres (164.60 sq mi).

== Geography ==
Wajima occupies the northwestern coast of Noto Peninsula and is bordered by the Sea of Japan on the north and west. Parts of the city are within the borders of the Noto Hantō Quasi-National Park. The island of Hegurajima, located 47 kilometers from the north coast of Noto Peninsula is administratively part of the city of Wajima.

=== Neighbouring municipalities ===
Ishikawa Prefecture:

- Anamizu
- Noto
- Shika
- Suzu

=== Climate ===
Wajima has a humid subtropical climate (Köppen Cfa) characterized by mild summers and cold winters with heavy snowfall. The average annual temperature in Wajima is 13.4 °C (56.1 °F). The average annual rainfall is 2,300 mm (91 in); September is the wettest month. The temperatures are highest on average in August, at around 25.6 °C (78.1 °F), and lowest in January, at around 2.9 °C (37.2 °F).

Climate data for Wajima (1991−2020 normals, extremes 1929−present)
Month	Jan	Feb	Mar	Apr	May	Jun	Jul	Aug	Sep	Oct	Nov	Dec	Year
Record high °C (°F)	17.1 (62.8)	22.8 (73.0)	26.9 (80.4)	29.0 (84.2)	32.5 (90.5)	34.2 (93.6)	38.2 (100.8)	37.5 (99.5)	38.6 (101.5)	31.6 (88.9)	26.5 (79.7)	21.5 (70.7)	38.6 (101.5)
Mean maximum °C (°F)	12.8 (55.0)	15.2 (59.4)	19.5 (67.1)	24.9 (76.8)	28.4 (83.1)	29.8 (85.6)	34.1 (93.4)	35.1 (95.2)	32.4 (90.3)	27.0 (80.6)	21.7 (71.1)	16.0 (60.8)	35.8 (96.4)
Mean daily maximum °C (°F)	6.4 (43.5)	7.0 (44.6)	10.5 (50.9)	16.0 (60.8)	20.9 (69.6)	24.0 (75.2)	28.2 (82.8)	30.1 (86.2)	26.3 (79.3)	21.0 (69.8)	15.1 (59.2)	9.4 (48.9)	17.9 (64.2)
Daily mean °C (°F)	3.3 (37.9)	3.4 (38.1)	6.1 (43.0)	11.1 (52.0)	16.1 (61.0)	20.0 (68.0)	24.4 (75.9)	25.9 (78.6)	22.0 (71.6)	16.3 (61.3)	10.8 (51.4)	5.9 (42.6)	13.8 (56.8)
Mean daily minimum °C (°F)	0.4 (32.7)	0.0 (32.0)	1.7 (35.1)	6.0 (42.8)	11.4 (52.5)	16.3 (61.3)	21.2 (70.2)	22.2 (72.0)	18.1 (64.6)	11.9 (53.4)	6.7 (44.1)	2.5 (36.5)	9.9 (49.8)
Mean minimum °C (°F)	−2.9 (26.8)	−3.2 (26.2)	−2.3 (27.9)	0.2 (32.4)	5.0 (41.0)	10.9 (51.6)	16.7 (62.1)	17.9 (64.2)	12.3 (54.1)	5.9 (42.6)	1.4 (34.5)	−1.3 (29.7)	−3.7 (25.3)
Record low °C (°F)	−10.4 (13.3)	−10.2 (13.6)	−7.3 (18.9)	−4.0 (24.8)	0.4 (32.7)	7.1 (44.8)	10.3 (50.5)	13.0 (55.4)	6.8 (44.2)	1.5 (34.7)	−1.4 (29.5)	−6.5 (20.3)	−10.4 (13.3)
Average precipitation mm (inches)	219.2 (8.63)	139.6 (5.50)	138.6 (5.46)	121.6 (4.79)	115.6 (4.55)	155.8 (6.13)	199.6 (7.86)	176.8 (6.96)	214.5 (8.44)	171.1 (6.74)	231.5 (9.11)	278.4 (10.96)	2,162.3 (85.13)
Average snowfall cm (inches)	54 (21)	42 (17)	8 (3.1)	0 (0)	0 (0)	0 (0)	0 (0)	0 (0)	0 (0)	0 (0)	0 (0)	18 (7.1)	121 (48)
Average precipitation days (≥ 1.0 mm)	23.1	17.8	15.5	10.9	9.9	9.7	11.5	9.4	12.2	12.8	17.3	22.3	172.4
Average snowy days (≥ 3 cm)	5.8	4.8	1.1	0	0	0	0	0	0	0	0	2.6	14.3
Average relative humidity (%)	74	73	70	70	72	79	81	79	79	76	75	75	75
Mean monthly sunshine hours	41.8	68.7	132.2	185.8	208.7	161.5	158.3	203.2	142.8	139.3	89.7	47.9	1,580.1
Source: Japan Meteorological Agency

== Demographics ==
Per Japanese census data, the population of Wajima has declined by roughly 50 percent over the past 50 years.

Historical population
Year	Pop.	±%
1970	48,220	—
1980	45,115	−6.4%
1990	40,309	−10.7%
2000	34,531	−14.3%
2010	29,858	−13.5%
2020	24,608	−17.6%

== History ==
The area around Wajima was part of ancient Noto Province, and was a noted seaport for trade with the Asian continent. During the Sengoku Period (1467–1568), the area was contested between the Hatakeyama clan, Uesugi clan and Maeda clan, with the area becoming part of Kaga Domain under the Edo period Tokugawa shogunate. It remained a noted seaport for the Kitamaebune coastal trade between Osaka and Hokkaido.

Following the Meiji restoration, the area was organised into Hōsu and Fugeshi districts. The town of Wajima was established with the creation of the modern municipalities system on April 1, 1889. It was raised to city status on March 31, 1954 after merging with the neighbouring villages of Oya, Kawarada, Konosu, Nishiho, Mii, and Najimi. On February 1, 2006, the town of Monzen was merged into Wajima.

On March 25, 2007, the 2007 Noto earthquake caused one death, 279-356 injuries (26 of them seriously), and damage to property in Wajima and other parts of Ishikawa Prefecture. Around 6,056 houses were affected by the quake, 476 of them were completely destroyed.

On January 1, 2024, the 2024 Noto earthquake struck the city, with a subsequent fire destroying many structures in the city centre.

== Government ==
Wajima has a mayor-council form of government with a directly elected mayor and a unicameral city legislature of 20 members.

== Economy ==
Commercial fishing, tourism, agriculture and the production of lacquerware are mainstays of the local economy.

== Transportation ==
Noto Airport is located there. The city does not currently have any passenger railway service. Highway National Route 249 goes through this city.

== Local attractions ==
=== Wajima lacquerware ===
The town is known in Japan for its lacquerware, called Wajima-nuri (Japanese: 輪島塗). There are artifacts showing lacquer was used to decorate and strengthen a shrine door from the 14th century. Wajima-nuri uses a technique that is unique to the area, mixing a finely powdered mineral.jinoko.

=== 1000 Rice Fields ===
Shiroyone Senmaida Rice Terraces "1000 Rice Fields" (Japanese: 千枚田, romanized: Senmaida)) is one of the most scenic places in Ishikawa. There are actually 1004 fields which are either owned and tended by families, or rented out and looked after by the locals. Each year during the last week of September, the names of two couples are drawn as part of a nationwide lottery to have their wedding ceremony at Senmaida. The event is open to the public.

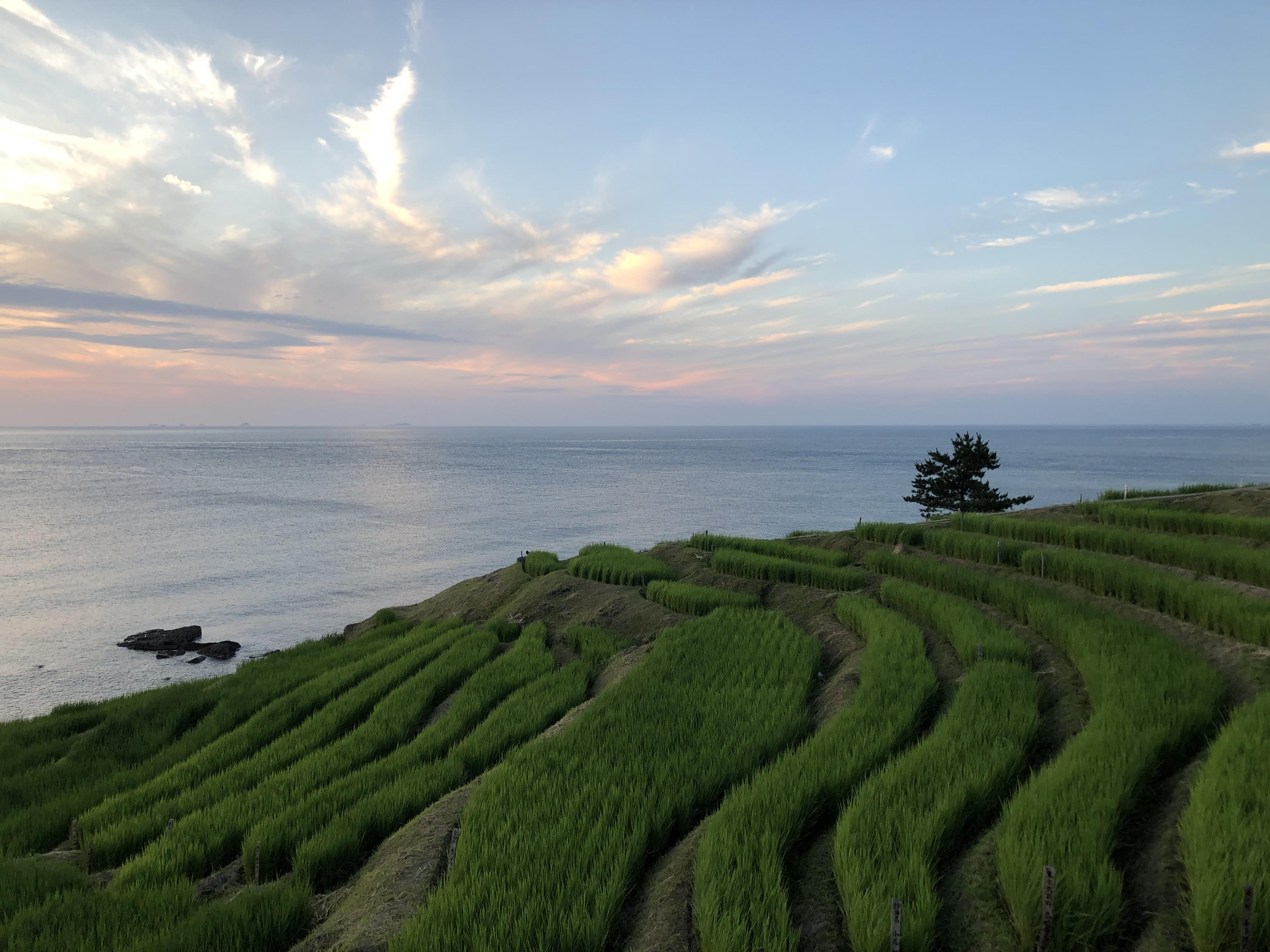
Shiroyone Senmaida Rice Terraces

As a memorial to the Noto earthquake, a tradition of lighting the fields began. Initially this was done with millions of candles placed around each field following the harvest. Due to the popularity of the spectacle, solar LED lanterns are now used allowing the fields to be lit nightly. The lanterns are installed at the end of September and are left up through March when work on the fields begins again. The fields remain lit for about four hours after sunset.

=== Kiriko Museum ===
Wajima has a museum of kiriko (Japanese: キリコ) lanterns.

=== Wajima Taisai ===
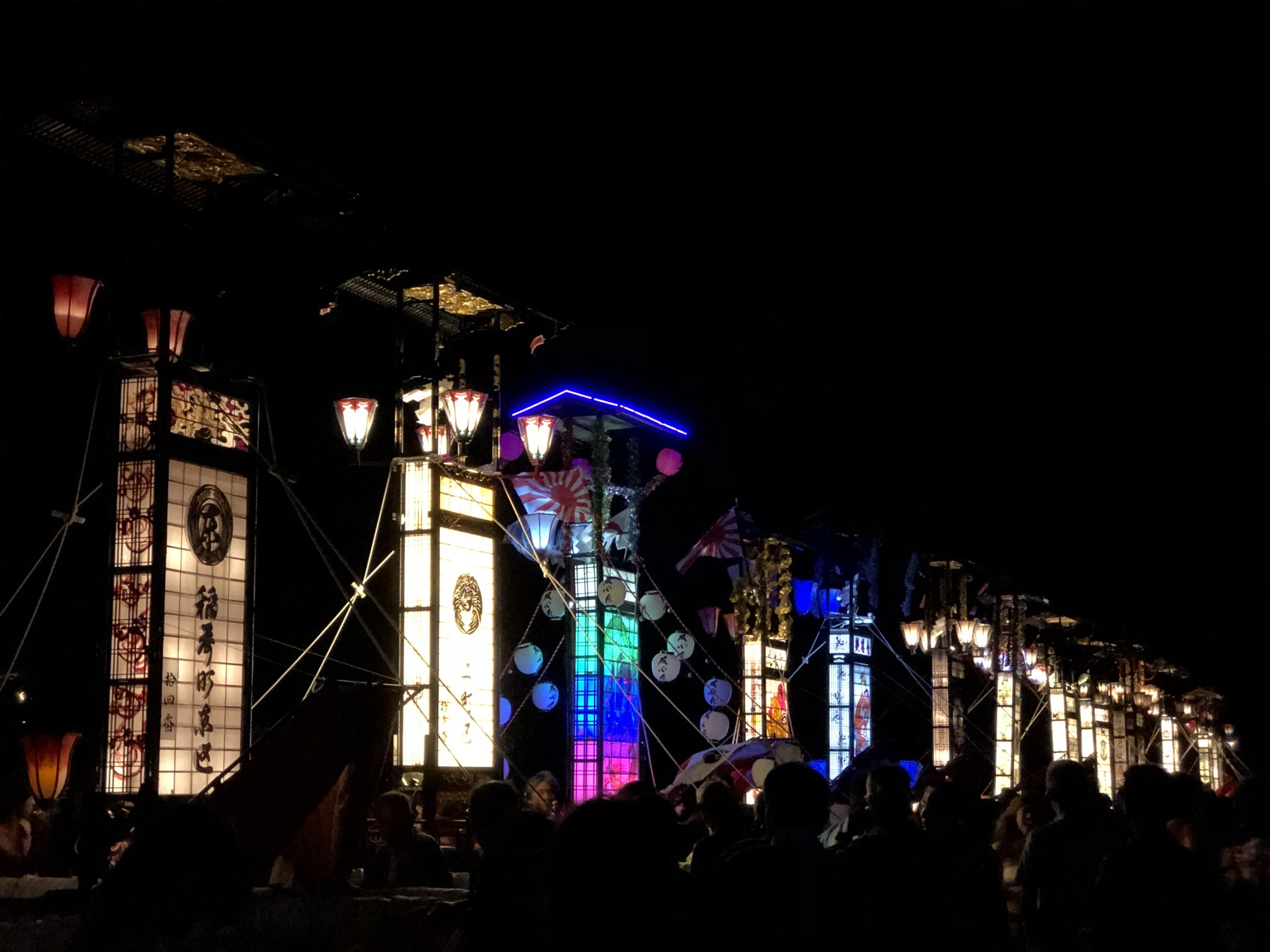
Giant kiriko lanterns lined up during Wajima Taisai

Every year from August 22 to 25, Wajima holds a four-day festival known as Wajima Taisai (Japanese: 輪島大祭). Huge (10 metres (33 feet) tall) kiriko lanterns and smaller paper lanterns are carried through the streets along with portable shrines called omikoshi.

The Story of the Taisai (Great Festival) depicts the love story between two Kami (gods): the Kami of the forest (a half blind male deity) and the Kami of the seven islands (the female deity) that are just off the coast of Wajima. Once a year the people of Noto guide the male Kami from his forest home through the city, while stopping at every business, home, and shrine to give blessings to the people of Wajima, and eventually to meet his wife at the sea. To guide him they carry bright lights (the kiriko) and beat taiko (drums).

The main event takes place on the third night of the festival at midnight at Wajima Marine Park.

=== Gojinjo-daiko ===
Gojinjo-daiko (御陣乗太鼓) is a Japanese drumming style, which is elected as a Wajima City's cultural heritage (appointed in 1961) and an Ishikawa Prefecture's intangible cultural heritage (appointed in 1963), consisting a part of Noto, Ishikawa’s GIAHS (Globally Important Agricultural Heritage Systems), which was appointed in 2011 as the first area in Japan by Food and Agriculture Organization.

Playing gojinjo-daiko is strictly restricted to residents in Nafune, a small village within Wajima, where only 250 people live. It is very rare to see a live drum performance.

The gojinjo-daiko began in 1577 when the famous general, Uesugi Kenshin invaded Noto. Because local people had no weapons, they resisted by beating war drums and wore ferocious looking devil masks with seaweed on their heads to scare off their enemies. The low sound of drums sound associated with the rumbling of the earth frightened off the invaders.

=== Wajima Crab Festival ===
The Wajima Crab Festival (Japanese: 輪島かに祭り) takes place each year in mid-November.

=== Kamakura Light Festival ===
Kamakura, in the northern part of the Noto Peninsula, is a small village which celebrates an annual light festival (matsuri) in which the residents place one candle in each of 20,000 glass sake cups and arrange them in geometric configurations after dark while listening to traditional Japanese music. The event is held on August 16.
