= Yukihisa Isobe =

Japanese artist (born 1936)

Yukihisa Isobe (磯辺行久, Isobe Yukihisa) (born 1935) is a Japanese artist whose practice has been shaped by his professional interest for ethical ecology. Active and relatively successful as a young painter in the post-war avant-garde, Isobe appeared to abandon his artistic practice when he moved to New York in 1965 and began a career in urban and ecological planning. However, Isobe maintained his passion for the visual arts and began creating two-dimensional works again in the 1990s that now employed a graphic vocabulary of scientific signs and forms. Since its inaugural edition in 2000, Isobe has contributed monumental environmental installations to the Echigo-Tsumari Art Triennale, notably Where has the river gone? in 2000, revealing to spectators man-made changes in the landscape.

== Biography ==
=== Artistic beginnings and early career: 1950s-1965 ===
Isobe was born in Tokyo in 1935. After being introduced to the artist Ei-Q while a student at Ueno high school, he joined the Demokrato artists association (デモクラート美術家協会) and was its youngest member. The group, which advocated for artists' creative liberty, was active from 1951 to 1957, and included notable figures like On Kawara, Ay-O, Toneyama Kojin, and Izumi Shigeru.

Isobe began studying painting at the Tokyo National University of Fine Arts and Music in 1954, while continuing to frequent Ei-Q, a particularly important influence on the young painter. Curator Motoi Masaki has stated that the young artist struggled to make sense of their differing approaches, which were diametrically opposed: the university, with its "worship of technical mastery", ran counter to Ei-Q's belief in abandoning conventional modes of expression. Isobe produced diverse series of works during this period, predominantly abstract, ranging from paintings strongly influenced by the informel style, and "punch-card" paintings featuring a dot motif, indicating his interest for geometric repetition. Isobe exhibited his works at the Yomiuri Indépendant Exhibition from 1957 to 1962.

Isobe graduated from university in 1959 and Ei-Q died shortly after, in 1960. Forced henceforth to forge his own path, Isobe fixated upon a shape that would occupy his paintings for the following years: the first works in his wappen, or coat of arms, series appeared in 1961. The artist filled canvases with these horseshoe-shaped forms, realized in bas-relief. Their execution varied across the years, as explains Motoi Masaki: "While the early wappens are painted to suggest actual coats of arms, the later wappens are distinguished more by the iteration of a prototypical shape, and color is only sparingly employed in recessed regions. In the latter, there is a return to form and to the infinite variety wrought through physical repetition." The wappen series, which included over three hundred works, excluding prints and watercolors, ended in 1965.

At a solo exhibition at the Tokyo Gallery in 1964, Isobe exhibited his geta-bako (shoe cabinet) series. The artist had developed an interest since 1962 in using such cabinets with many small doors and cubbies, filling them with everyday objects like paper cups or pasting photographs onto their doors, or again employing the painted wappen motif. Isobe invited spectators to engage with the work by opening and closing the cubby doors and rearranging the objects within.

When all of the doors to the cubbies containing their banal, everyday objects were closed, they revealed another artwork. The artist created a number of such cabinets decorated with reproductions of classical Japanese paintings, like those of 17th century master Sotatsu Tawayara. Motoi Masaki succinctly explains the implications of Isobe's interactive work: "What we initially held to be art submerges into the commonplace; everyday objects [...] ascend to the realm of art. Through the physical action of the viewer, the work becomes an apparatus for demonstrating the equality between the everyday flood of things and symbols and art itself." Isobe developed his box series by using larger tansu cabinets, which spectators again were invited to manipulate. He ceased production in 1965.

Isobe was also a prolific printmaker. Working out of his studio in Aoyama, Isobe purchased a lithograph press in 1954. He is estimated to have produced between 1,000 and 1,500 lithographs during the 1950s and early 1960s.

Many of Isobe's early works were collected by Ohashi Yoshikazu, an art collector, businessman and scientist. Isobe admitted that he was greatly influenced by Ohashi, saying later: "What I learned from Mr. Ohashi then, was not to think about art in a narrow way [...] maybe that is the reason why I left the arts to study science and ecology at an American university, beyond the frontiers of the art world?"

=== Move to New York and career change: 1965-1975 ===
Isobe moved to New York in 1965 and stopped most of his artistic production shortly thereafter. He received a work permit in 1967 and that same year began working for the New York Human Resources Administration. A year later he was employed as an events coordinator for the City of New York's Parks Department. He also was a planner for the Phoenix House, a drug rehabilitation center.

Despite his new professional turn, Isobe maintained an interest in new forms of creation, and was particularly fascinated by architectural structures that employed wind and air, like the Montreal Biosphere designed by Buckminster Fuller in 1967. In 1969, Isobe created Floating Sculpture, a parachute supported by wind currents in perpetual motion, realizing several artistic projects and performances with the parachute as apparatus. In 1970, as part of an Earth Day celebration, he created Air-Structured Dome, a large installation in Union Square, in which visitors could enter and move about.

In 1968, his blooming interest in ecology led him to enter the Regional Planning Department as a postgraduate student at Pennsylvania University. He studied under the landscape architect Ian L. McHarg, who was a precursor of the environmental planning movement, with a focus on understanding and limiting the human impact on the natural environment.

Isobe graduated in 1972 after completing his thesis, entitled "An Ecological Planning on the Therapeutic Community", inspired by his work on the Phoenix House. He began working as an urban and ecological planner in earnest from 1972 onwards, and established his own ecological planning firm, Regional Planning Team Inc, Co, in 1975.

Isobe shifted his focus in 1975 to educating Japanese people about ecological planning. In 1976, he wrote an article that appeared in Kenchiku Bunka Magazine entitled "Ecological Planning: Methods and Application", which was well received by Japan's architectural community. He moved back to Japan in 1976, but did not immediately take his artistic practices up again, rather continuing his professional urban planning activities and teaching at various universities around Japan.

=== Return to art-making: 1990s - today ===
In an interview, Isobe explained that, during the years he was not active as an artist, he remained attentive to the art world: "It was then that I observed many similarities between the forms of visual expression proposed by artists, and those used by science. This encouraged me to experiment with many methods of visual translation of the scientific data that I was working on."

Isobe's large two-dimensional works created in the 1990s, called the Ecological Context series, are dynamic collages, with maps often being used as a starting surface. Arrows, crosses, and other signs and geometric forms are cut from different materials, such as cloth, cardboard, sails or parachute. These forms become bold strokes and create dizzying compositions that evoke forces of energy and consumption. Concerning this series, Isobe stated: "Through my work, I hope today to highlight the importance of the relationship between man and his environment through a means able to be read visually, and not conceptually."

In 2000, as part of the first edition of the Echigo-Tsumari Art Triennale, Isobe created a large-scale environmental installation entitled Where has the river gone? Employing yellow poles topped with yellow flags, Isobe traced across a stretch of rice fields the 3.5 kilometers of where the Shinano river once ran, before being blocked and transformed by man-made dams. Isobe's subsequent interventions at the Triennale, such as Monument of Mudslide (2015) and Monument of Siphon (2018) have similarly rendered visible man-made environmental changes that would otherwise go unnoticed.

=== Legacy at the SoKo Museum ===
2015 marked the opening of the Isobe Yukihisa Memorial Echigo Tsumari Kiyotsu Soko Museum of Art (SoKo) in Niigata. The institution, established within the framework of the Echigo Tsumari Art Triennial, is housed in a gymnasium of a former primary school. It aims to be an alternative space for the presentation of large-scale contemporary artworks.

In 2018, work was completed on the wing of SoKo designed specifically to display Isobe's many works from the 1950s onwards. Triennale director Fram Kitagawa sought out Isobe's guidance when first planning the festival as both an artist and an ecological planner, and Isobe's work has featured there since its first edition in 2000. As such, Isobe is given a place of honor at the Triennale.

== Collections and selected exhibitions ==
Isobe's works can be found in the collections of the National Museum of Modern Art, Tokyo, the National Museum of Art, Osaka, the National Museum of Modern Art, Kyoto, the Niigata Prefectural Museum of Modern Art, and the collection of the Centre national des arts plastiques.
