= Noto Airport =

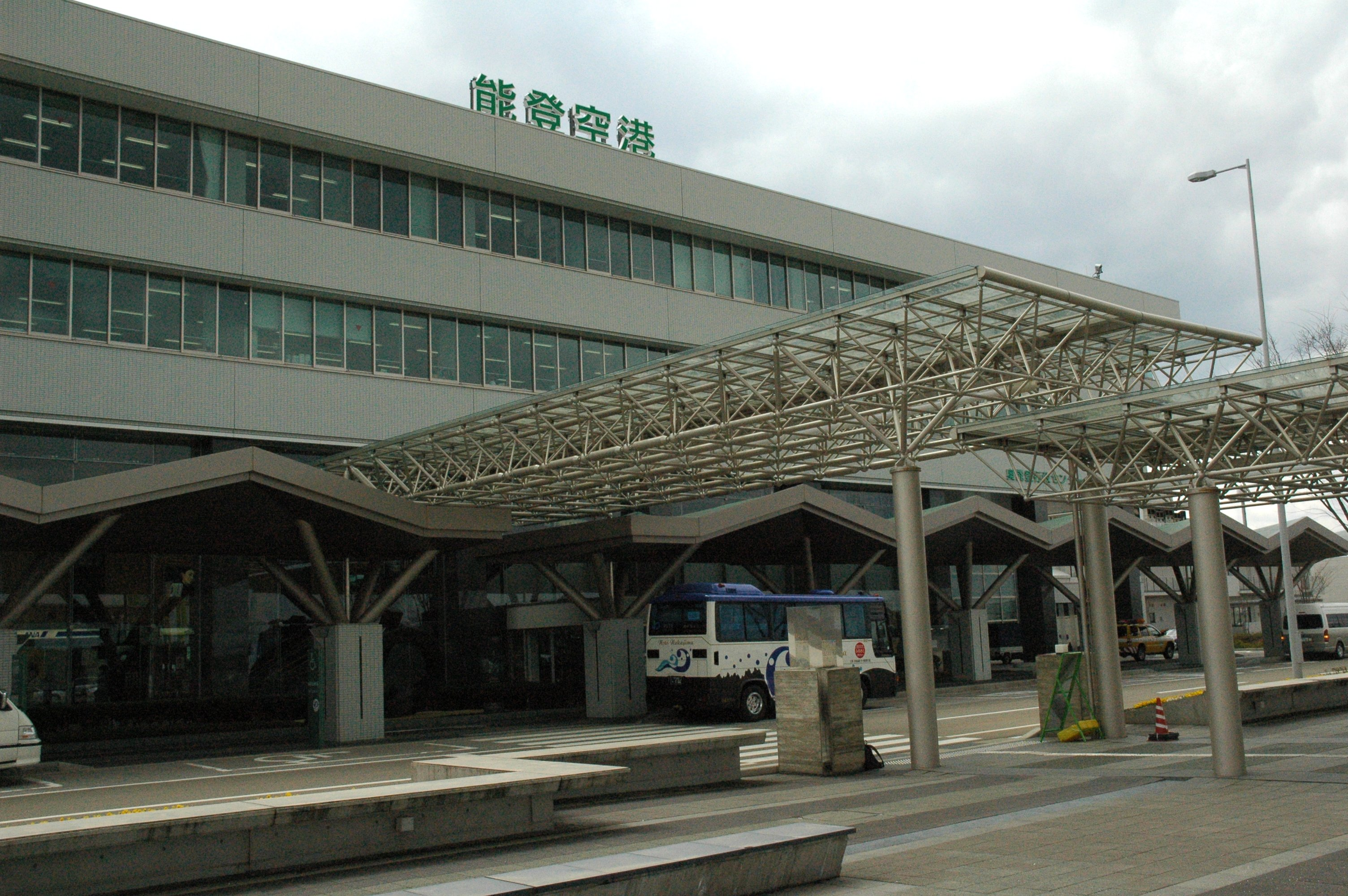
- IATA: NTQ; ICAO: RJNW

Summary
- Airport type: Public
- Operator: Ministry of Transport
- Location: Wajima, Ishikawa
- Elevation AMSL: 718 ft (219 m)
- Coordinates: 37°17′36″N 136°57′44″E

Map
- Location in Japan RJNW (Japan)

Runways
Direction	Length		Surface
Direction	m	ft	Surface
07/25	2,000	6,562	Asphalt concrete

Statistics (2015)
- Passengers: 156,374
- Cargo (metric tonnes): 7
- Aircraft movement: 3,299
- Source: Japanese Ministry of Land, Infrastructure, Transport and Tourism

Noto Airport (能登空港, Noto Kūkō) (IATA: NTQ, ICAO: RJNW), marketed as Noto Satoyama Airport (のと里山空港, Noto Satoyama Kūkō) and also unofficially known as Wajima Airport (輪島空港, Wajima Kūkō) is a domestic airport located 6.4 NM (11.9 km; 7.4 mi) south southeast of the city of Wajima on the Noto Peninsula of Ishikawa Prefecture, Japan.

The airport is a four-story building with two jetways. It is officially designated a third class airport.

== History ==
Completed on July 7, 2003, Noto Airport is among Japan's newest greenfield airports not constructed to replace an existing facility. Initially, All Nippon Airways (ANA) was only willing to operate one flight per day. Ishikawa Prefecture thus suggested Japan's first occupancy guarantee agreement (搭乗率保証制度), in which ANA agreed to operate two daily flights and in exchange Ishikawa Prefecture agreed to compensate ANA if occupancy fell below a set target (initially 70%) and gross ticket sales were under 200 million yen. However, the agreement also specified that if the target is exceeded, ANA must pay the excess back to Ishikawa Prefecture. So far, the agreement seems to have been mutually beneficial:

The airport's parking lot was used an evacuation site in the aftermath of the 2024 Noto earthquake. Following a temporary closure, the airport was restored to allow Self-Defense Forces flights into the field on January 11 and re-opened for commercial flights on January 27, although commercial facilities within the terminal remained closed.

In May 21, 2026, the Ishikawa Prefectural government announced that the airport is set to be nicknamed “Noto Satoyama Pokémon with You Airport” from July 7 to September 30, 2029, making it the first airport in the world to bear the Pokémon name.

Year	Plane	Target occupancy	Actual occupancy	Excess	Reference
2003–2004	Boeing 737-500, 126 seats	70%	79.5%	+¥97.3 million
2004–2005	Boeing 737, 170 seats	63%	64.6%	+¥15.9 million
2005–2006	Boeing 737, 166 seats	64%	66.5%	+¥20.0 million
2006–2007	Airbus A320, 166 seats	62%	65.1%	?

== Airlines and destinations ==
Airlines	Destinations
All Nippon Airways	Tokyo–Haneda
