= Noto Peninsula =

Peninsula on Honshū Island, Japan

Native name: 能登半島
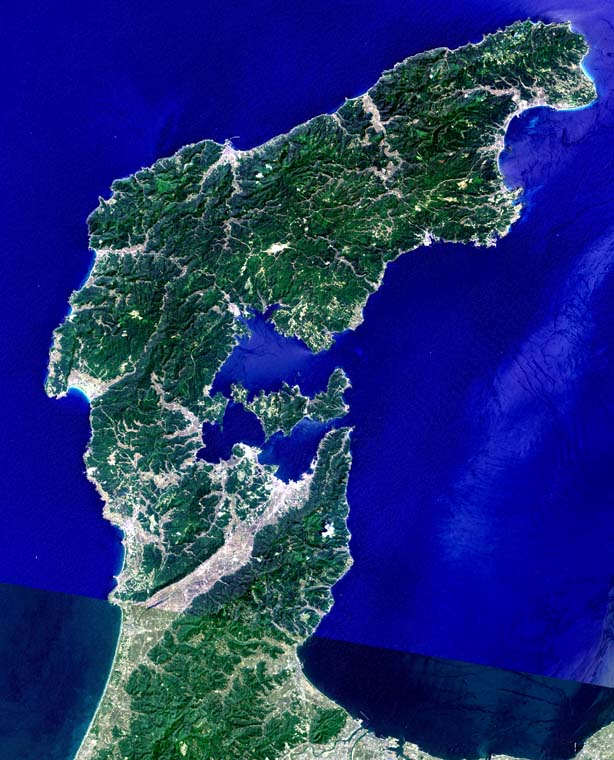
- Landsat image with high-resolution data from Space Shuttle

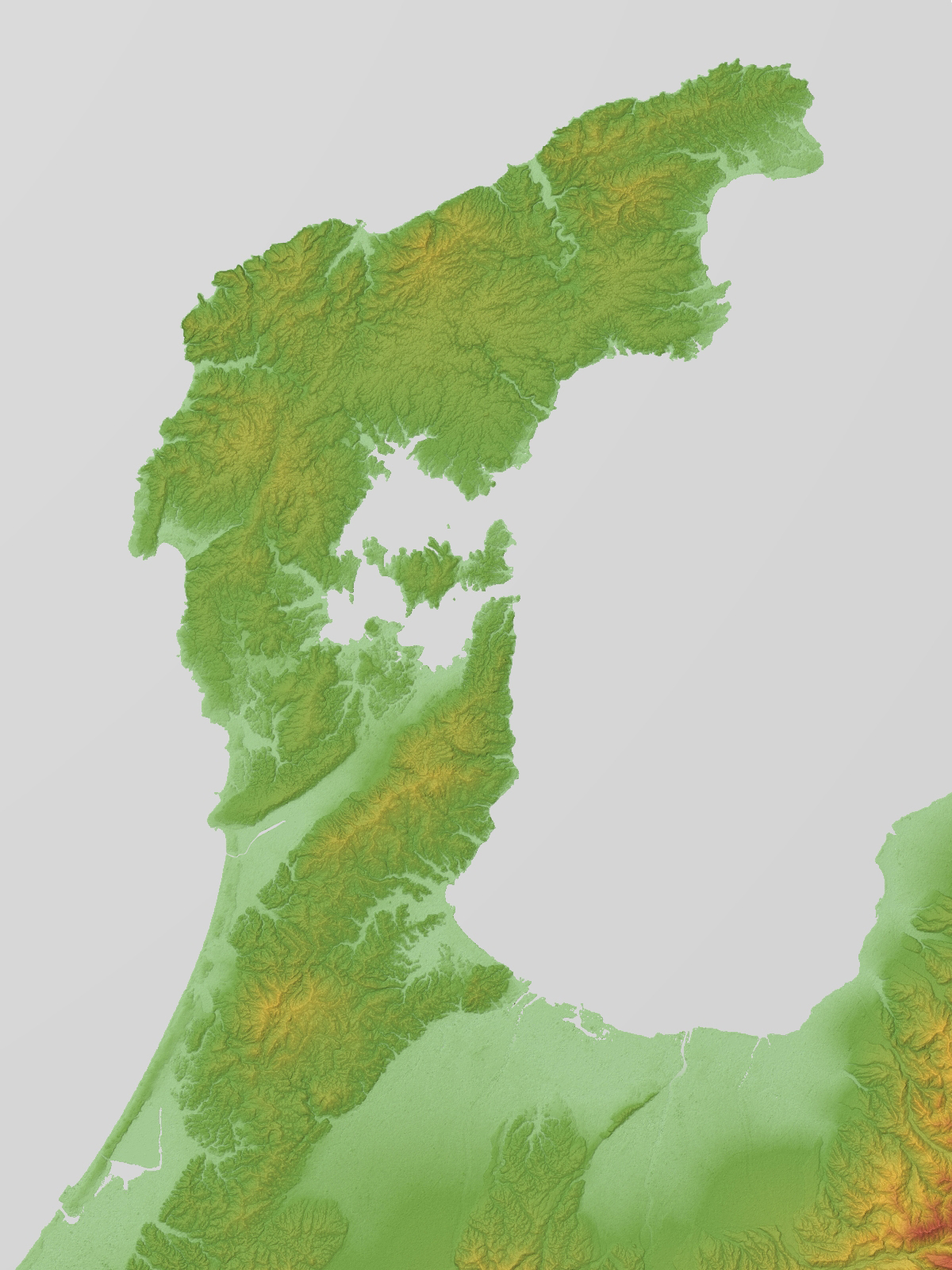
- Topographic map of Noto Peninsula

- Location in Japan

Geography
- Location: Sea of Japan
- Coordinates: 37.2°N 136.9°E

Administration
- Japan
- Prefecture: Ishikawa Prefecture

Location

The Noto Peninsula (能登半島, Noto-hantō) is a peninsula that projects north into the Sea of Japan from the coast of Ishikawa Prefecture in central Honshū, the main island of Japan. Before the Meiji era, the peninsula belonged to Noto Province. The main industries of the peninsula are agriculture, fisheries, and tourism.

== Name ==
According to Alexander Vovin, the name is derived from Ainu not 'cape' or noto 'big cape'. It is written with two ateji (ad hoc kanji used for an unrelated word): 能 nō 'ability' and 登 tō/to 'ascend'.

== Area and spots ==
=== Three regions ===
The area of the Noto Peninsula is divided into three regions.

Kuchi-Noto (Entrance of Noto)
South part of the area. Hakui City, Kahoku City, Hōdatsu-shimizu Town, Shika Town
Naka-Noto (Middle of Noto)
Middle part of the area. Nanao City, Wakura Onsen Resort, Naka-Noto Town, Tatsuruhama
Oku-Noto (Deep Noto or North Noto)
North part of the area. Wajima City, Suzu City, Noto Town, Anamizu Town, Noto Island

== In film ==
The Noto Peninsula features prominently in the Japanese film noir Zero Focus (Zero no Shoten, 1961), directed by Yoshitaro Nomura. The film features footage of the peninsula's coast, along with a dissection of the area's social distinctions. Noto Peninsula is also the setting of Hirokazu Koreeda's second film Maborosi (1995) and Shōhei Imamura's final film Warm Water Under a Red Bridge (Akai Hashi no Shita no Nurui Mizu, 2001). Suzu, the city located at the tip of the Noto Peninsula, is the setting for the 2014 film Saihate Nite.

== Transportation ==
JR Nanao Line
Comes from Kanazawa to Wakura Onsen Station via Unoke, Hakui, Nanao.
Noto Railway
Small local railway from Wakura to Anamizu.
Noto Airport
Located between Anamizu and Wajima. Air line to Tokyo International Airport.
Noto Satoyama Kaido
Stretches from Kanazawa to Anamizu Town.
No-etu Expressway (partly opened)
Comes from Oyabe (Toyama) to Wajima via Nanao and Noto Airport.
Suzu Road
A free elongation of the Noto Tollway, from Anamizu to Suzu.
Route 249
National road that stretches around the Noto Peninsula.

== Earthquakes ==
The 2007 Noto earthquake on March 25, 2007 shook the peninsula, causing one death and at least 170 injuries. Between May 2018 and June 2022 the northeastern tip of Noto experienced an earthquake swarm with over 20,000 earthquakes, including 10 with a magnitude over 4. A magnitude 6.3 earthquake struck in May 2023. More than 700 died in the 2024 Noto earthquake on January 1, 2024.

== Heritage designation ==
The Noto Peninsula was designated as a part of Globally Important Agricultural Heritage Systems, awarded by the Ministry of Agriculture, Forestry and Fisheries in 2011.
