= 2024 Noto earthquake =

Earthquake in Japan

- 令和6年能登半島地震
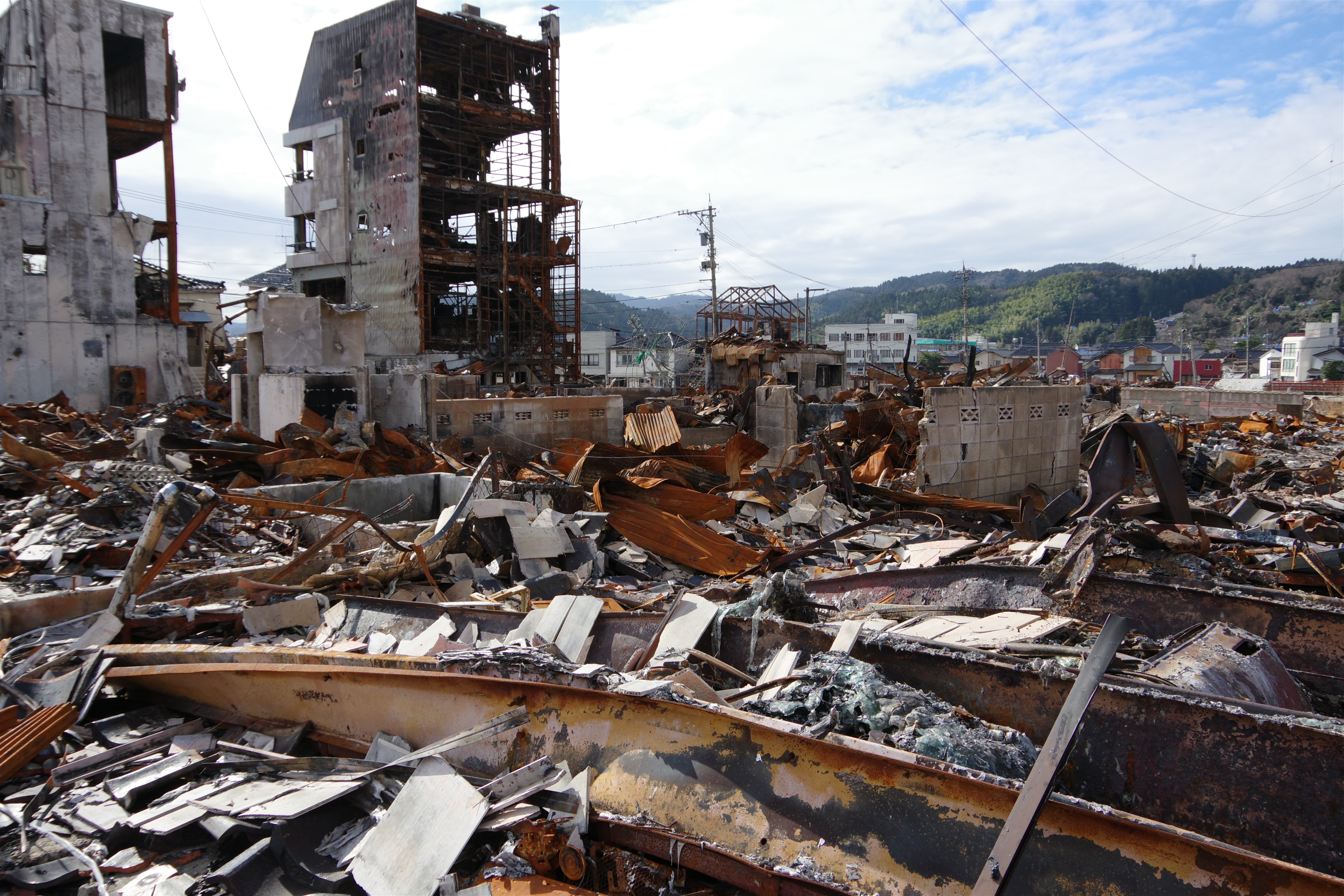
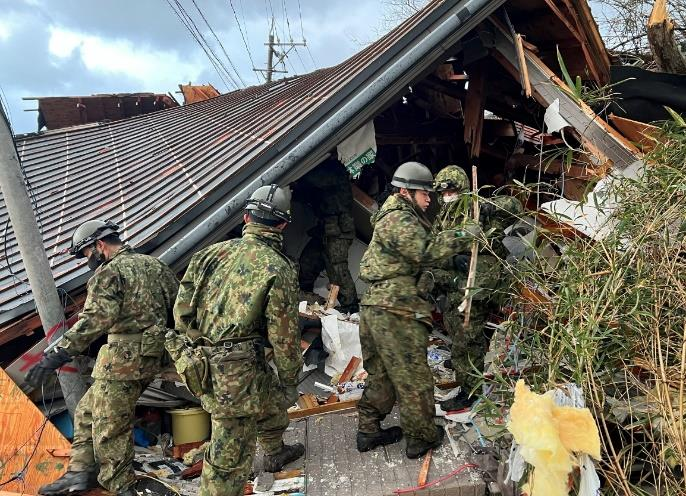
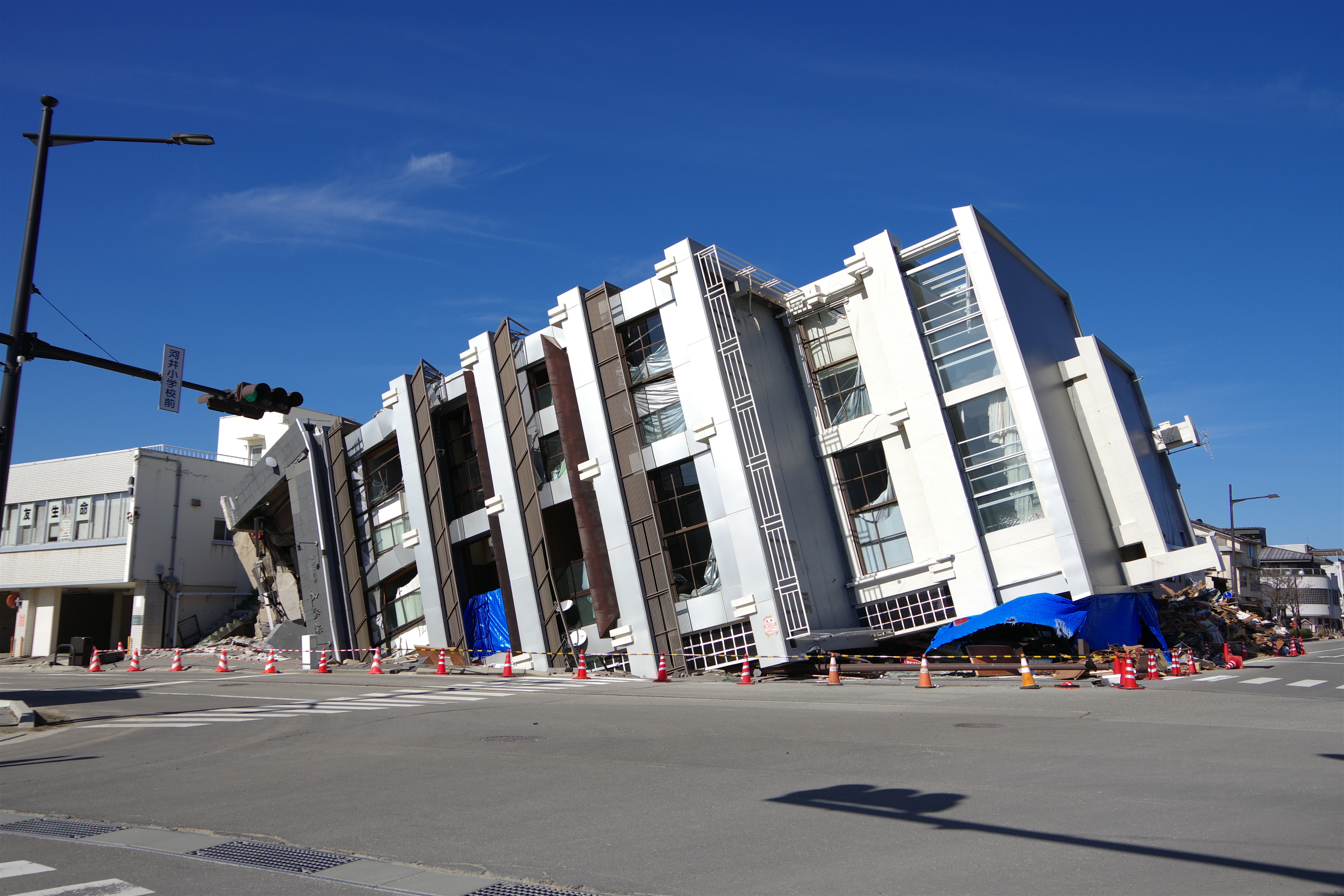
- From top, left to right: Aftermath of the earthquake and fires at Wajima morning market • The troops of JSDF search for people trapped in Suzu • A collapsed building in Wajima

- Location within Japan
- UTC time: 2024-01-01 07:10:09
- ISC event: 636373819
- USGS-ANSS: ComCat
- Local date: 1 January 2024
- Local time: 16:10:09 JST (UTC+9)
- Duration: c. 80 seconds
- Magnitude: M_{JMA} 7.6 M_{w} 7.5
- Depth: 10 km (6 mi) (USGS) 16 km (10 mi) (JMA)
- Epicenter: 37.488°N 137.271°E
- Type: Reverse
- Areas affected: Ishikawa Prefecture, Chūbu region, Japan
- Total damage: ¥1.1–2.6 trillion (US$ 7.4–17.6 billion) (estimated)
- Max. intensity: JMA 7 (MMI XI)
- Peak acceleration: 2.88 g (2,826 gal)
- Tsunami: 11.3 m (37 ft)
- Landslides: Yes
- Foreshocks: 5.7 M_{JMA}
- Aftershocks: 8,582 total; 169 of M ≥ 4; Largest: M_{JMA} 6.1 or mb 6.2
- Casualties: 761 fatalities, (Note: 228 direct and 533 indirect) 1,410 injuries, 2 missing

On 1 January 2024, at 16:10:09 JST (07:10:09 UTC), a M_{JMA}7.6 (M_{w}7.5) earthquake struck 6 km (3.7 mi) north-northeast of Suzu, located on the Noto Peninsula of Ishikawa Prefecture, Japan. The reverse-faulting shock achieved a maximum JMA seismic intensity of Shindo 7 and Modified Mercalli intensity of X–XI (Extreme). The shaking and accompanying tsunami caused widespread destruction on the Noto Peninsula, particularly in the towns of Suzu, Wajima, Noto and Anamizu. Damage was also recorded in Toyama and Niigata prefectures.

There were 761 deaths confirmed and two people remain missing. At least 747 fatalities occurred in Ishikawa, 8 in Toyama and 6 more in Niigata. The mainshock also injured more than 1,400 people and damaged 204,903 structures across nine prefectures. Of these, 228 deaths were directly attributed to the earthquake, and the other 533 were disaster-related deaths aggravated by fear of aftershocks, electricity and water outages and evacuations to temporary shelters and other locations. It was the deadliest earthquake in Japan since the 2016 Kumamoto earthquake.

The Japan Meteorological Agency (JMA) officially named this earthquake the 2024 Noto Peninsula earthquake (Japanese: 令和6年能登半島地震, Hepburn: Reiwa 6-nen Noto-hantō Jishin). It led to Japan's first major tsunami warning since the 2011 Tōhoku earthquake, and a tsunami of 11.3 m (37 ft) was measured in Wajima on the peninsula.

== Tectonic setting ==
=== Overview ===
Noto Peninsula lies on the southeastern margin of the Sea of Japan, which was formed by back-arc rifting related to subduction of the Pacific plate beneath the Eurasian plate along the Japan Trench. This process began during the Early Miocene, ending in the Middle Miocene. By the late Pliocene the tectonic regime changed to compression, probably associated with collision between the Izu–Bonin Arc and Honshu. This led to reactivation of the rift faults in reverse sense, combined with inversion of the basins formed by these faults. Currently Japan is situated on the convergent boundaries between the Pacific, Philippine Sea, North American and Eurasian Plates. Along the island arc's east and southeast coasts, subduction of the Pacific and Philippine Sea plates occurs at the Japan Trench and Nankai Trough, respectively. The west coast of Honshu, bordering the Sea of Japan, is a north–south trending convergent boundary between the Eurasian and North American Plates. It has been proposed that it is an incipient subduction zone, consisting of eastward-dipping thrust faults.

The rifting and subsequent inversion has created a series of faults along the coast that have the potential to move and cause earthquakes, in the range of M_{w}6.8–7.9, in many cases with tsunamis. Major earthquakes and tsunamis along this boundary occurred in 1833, 1940, 1964, 1983 and 1993. The largest and most destructive tsunami in the Sea of Japan occurred in 1741 and was attributed to the eruption of Oshima. A fault known as the F43 (in the list of 60 faults evaluated) reaches the seabed just north of the Noto peninsula trending WSW–ENE. This southeast-dipping fault, which consists of two segments with a combined length of 94.2 km (58.5 mi), has been judged to be capable of producing an earthquake of M_{w}7.6.

=== Earthquake swarm ===
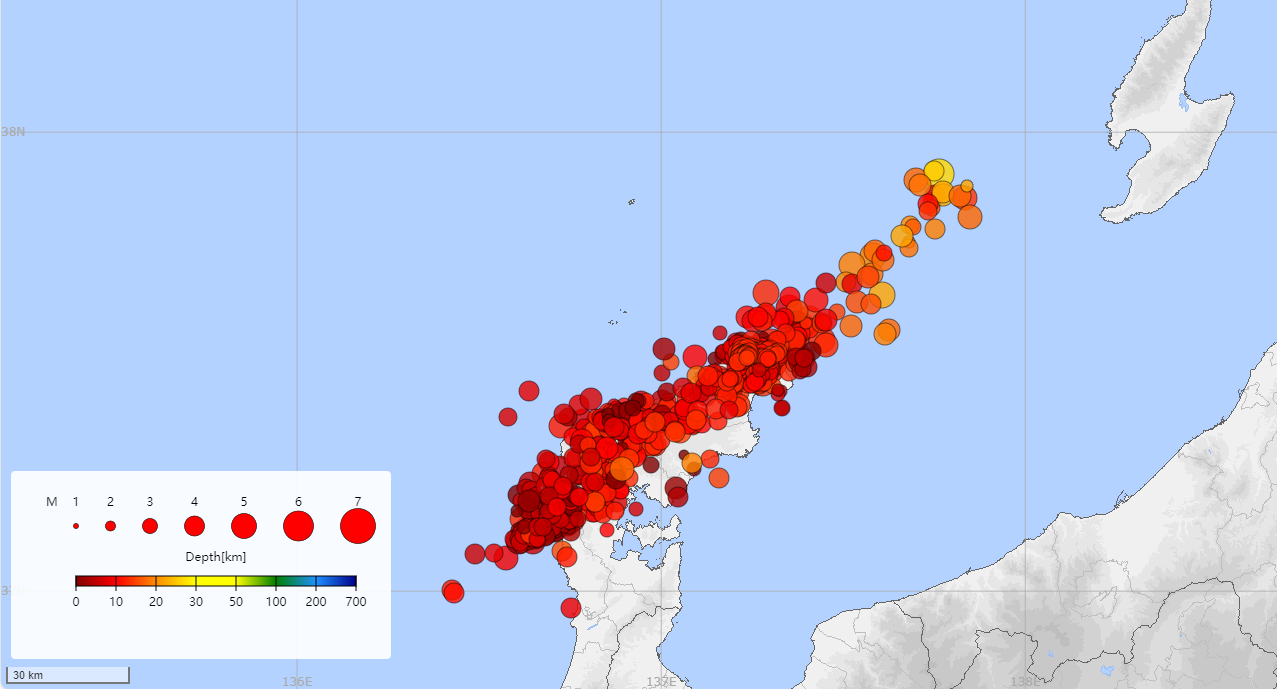
Noto earthquake swarm

The northeastern tip of the Noto Peninsula has been subject to an earthquake swarm for the last three years, with the largest earthquake being a M_{JMA} 6.5 event that took place in May 2023. The 1 January 2024 mainshock was the strongest to hit the peninsula since records began in 1885.

The swarm began in December 2020 at depths greater than 15 km (9.3 mi) beneath the peninsula's northeast. By mid-March 2021, the earthquake swarm migrated to shallower depths above 15 km (9.3 mi). Most earthquakes after May 2021 occurred at 10–15 km (6.2–9.3 mi) depth. The M_{w} 7.5 earthquake occurring after the swarm was deemed "rare". The general understanding of earthquake swarms are that due to the high intensity in crustal fracturing, such areas experiencing them are unlikely to generate large earthquakes. The swarm may have been triggered by the intrusion of fluids at deeper depths in response to crustal deformation.

Fluid upwelling may be occurring beneath the peninsula as evidenced by a 70 mm (2.8 in) uplift of the surface above the swarm. Seismologists considered the swarm unexpected as the peninsula lacked active volcanic or geothermal features to produce high-pressure fluids that would promote such seismic activity. These fluids may have originated from the upper mantle and migrated upwards into the crust through faults. Lubricated by fluids, these faults began producing earthquakes. No direct connection between the swarm and mainshock has been established, however, the swarm may have induced stress on these faults as they moved.

== Earthquake ==
USGS ShakeMap

The United States Geological Survey (USGS) reported a moment magnitude of 7.5 and a focal depth of 10 km (6.2 mi) for the earthquake. The Japan Meteorological Agency recorded a magnitude of M_{JMA} 7.6. It was the largest earthquake to strike Ishikawa since at least 1885, and the largest to strike Mainland Japan since the 2011 Tōhoku earthquake.

The focal mechanism of the mainshock corresponded to shallow reverse faulting along a northeast-trending plane dipping northwest or southeast, happening along the convergent boundary between the Okhotsk Plate and Amurian Plate. A magnitude 5.8 foreshock struck four minutes before the mainshock, while a magnitude 6.2 aftershock struck nine minutes later. More than 1,200 aftershocks were recorded across a 100 km (62 mi) zone. At least seven of them registered a magnitude of 5.0 and above.

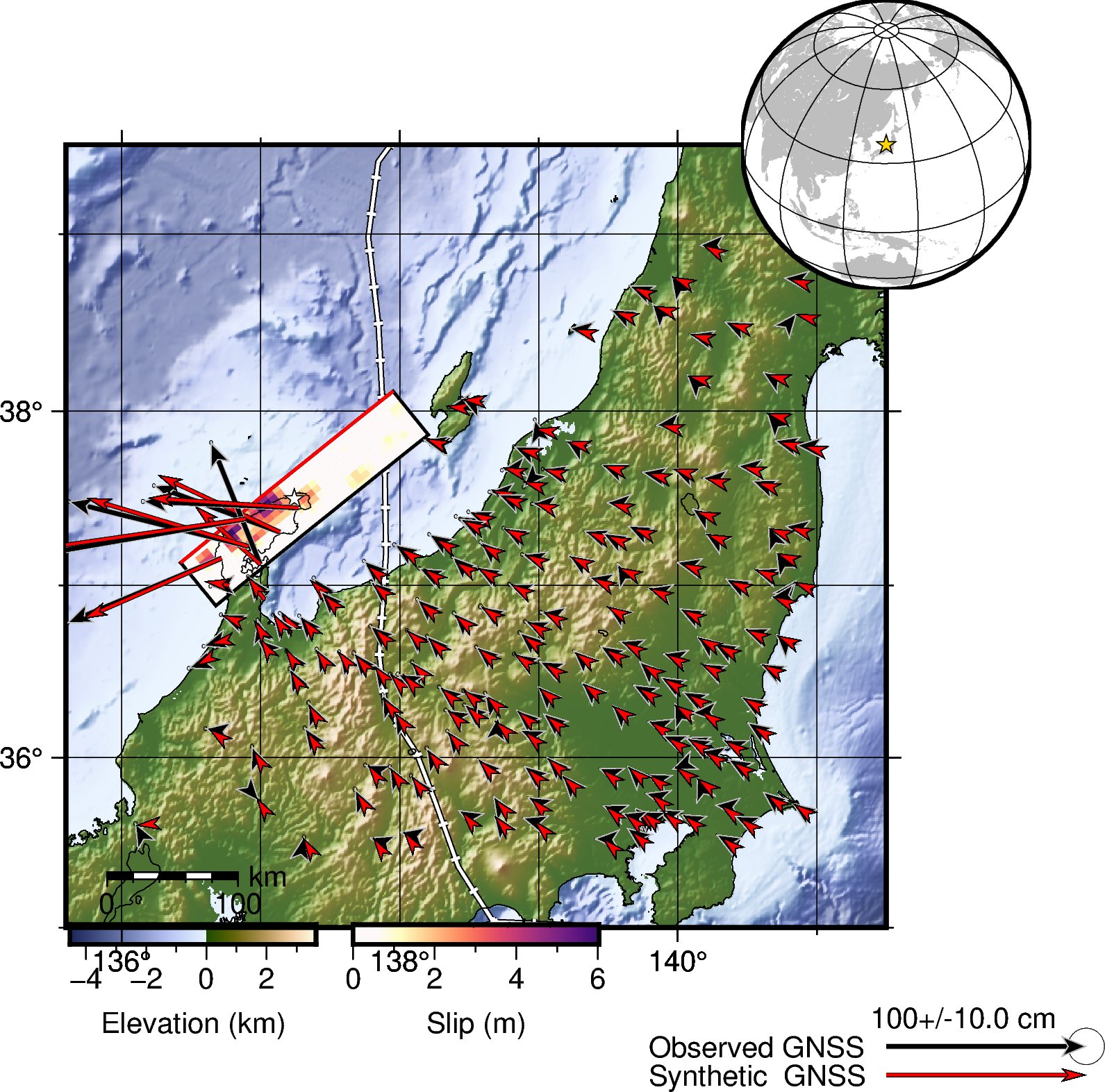
USGS-generated Finite Fault Surface Projection

According to a finite fault model released by the USGS, the earthquake rupture extended over 160 km (99 mi) by 20 km (12 mi) from the southwestern Noto Peninsula to Sado Island along a southeast-dipping fault. Slip was mostly concentrated entirely beneath the peninsula. The zones of the largest slip occurred southwest of the hypocenter while little to no slip occurred on the segment offshore between the peninsula and island. The patch immediately southwest of the epicenter produced a displacement of 5.992 m (20 ft) beneath the peninsula's coast. Another zone of slip occurred further southwest beneath the same stretch of coastline, producing up to 6.030 m (20 ft) of slip beneath Motoichi. The fault likely ruptured towards the seafloor at the peninsula while little to no slip was observed on the seafloor between the peninsula and Sado Island. The entire rupture process took about 50 seconds with the greatest phase of seismic moment release occurring some 25 seconds after initiation.

Due to the lack of significant slip on the segment offshore between the peninsula and Sado Island, seismologist Kenji Satake said there is still potential for another magnitude 7.0 or larger earthquake and tsunami. Research led by Kimiyuki Asano at the Disaster Prevention Research Institute at Kyoto University analysed waveforms recorded by seismometers and determined the earthquake consisted of two subevents. The first subevent, measuring M_{JMA} 7.3, ruptured a fault beneath the peninsula, causing coastal uplift. A second subevent identical in magnitude ruptured the offshore segment 13 seconds after the completion of the first subevent.

=== Ground effects ===
About 85 km (53 mi) of coastline spanning Suzu, Wajima and Shika was raised and the shore moved seawards by up to 200 m (660 ft). Wajima's Minazuki Bay was uplifted 4 m (13 ft) while at Nagahashimachi's fishing port, a tide gauge was rendered unusable because the seafloor was exposed.

The Geospatial Information Authority of Japan (GSI) said parts of the country moved up to 1.3 m (4 ft 3 in) westwards with the maximum displacement observed at Wajima due to crustal deformation. At Anamizu, land shifted 1 m (3 ft 3 in) westwards. However, the agency said these movements could be slope or local ground movement instead. The agency also added that crustal uplift of 4 m (13 ft) occurred in western Wajima and 1.1 m (3 ft 7 in) in northern Suzu. Near Wajima's port, the shoreline of a sandy beach was moved 250 m (820 ft) seawards due to the coastal uplift. Uplift at Kaiso Fishing Port in Wajima by 4 m (13 ft) exposed parts of the seafloor.

The coastline in the Kawaura district of Suzu moved 175 m (574 ft) seawards due to the coastal uplift, while the land area expanded by a total of 2.4 km^{2} (0.93 sq mi). A port in the Ozawa district of Wajima was entirely drained. A seaward movement of 240 m (790 ft) was detected in the coasts of Monzenmachi and Kuroshimamachi districts in Wajima, as well as an expansion of 4.4 km^{2} (1.7 sq mi) in the Noto Peninsula. Areas in the northern part of the peninsula were also found to have risen while the southern sections, particularly in Anamizu, had subsided.

The GSI said due to the land expansion by 4.4 km^{2} (1.7 sq mi), Ishikawa Prefecture may have become larger than Fukui Prefecture in land area. The latter, having an area of 4,190.54 km^{2} (1,617.98 sq mi), is 4.34 km^{2} (1.68 sq mi) larger than Ishikawa Prefecture, according to a survey in October 2023. However, this difference was expected to be temporary due to the effects of coastal erosion. It has been theorized that the coastal uplift may have fortuitously lessened the effects of the tsunami which followed the earthquake.

Kaiso Fishing Port before and after seismic uplift

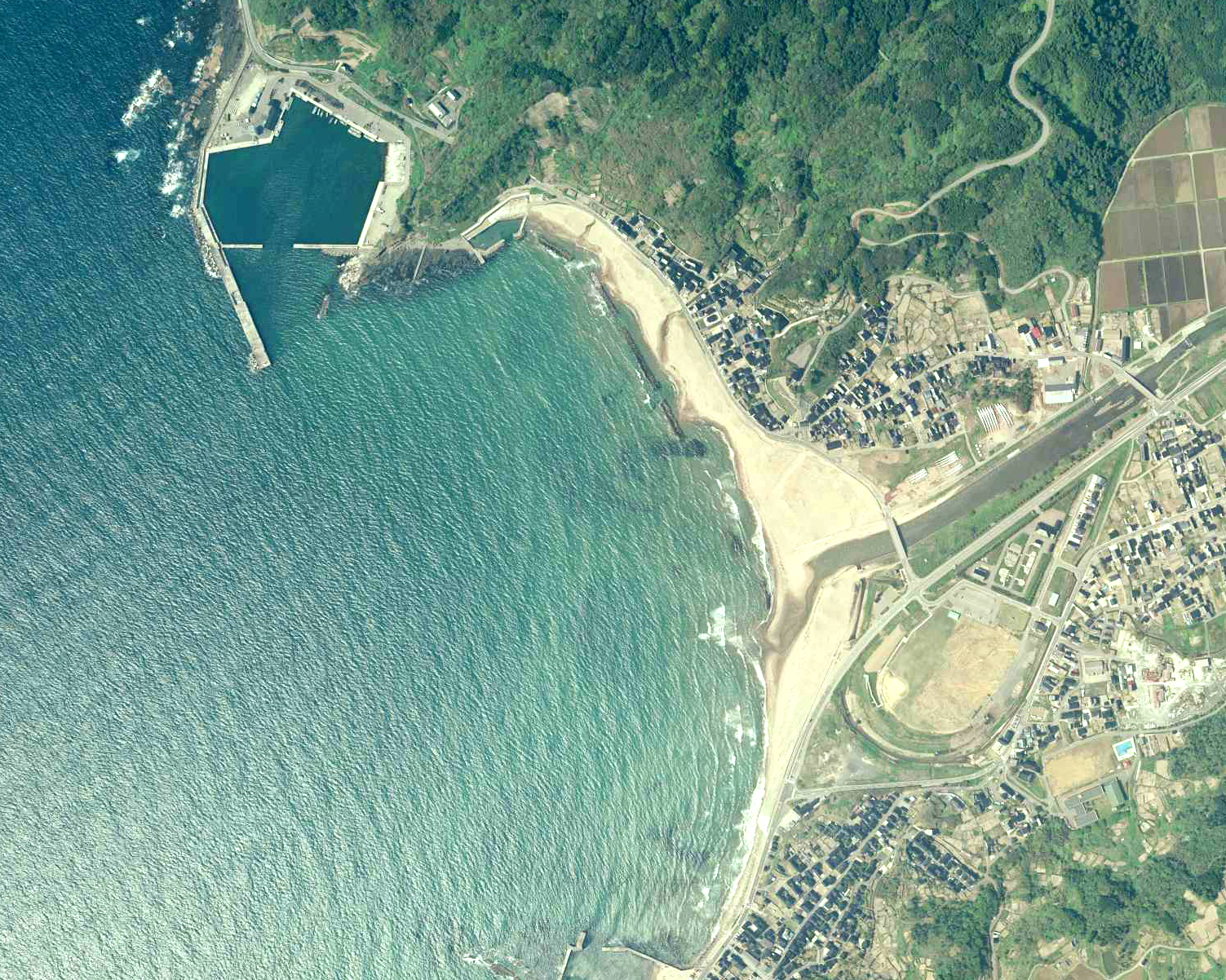
Photographed in 2010: a levee can be seen along the shore

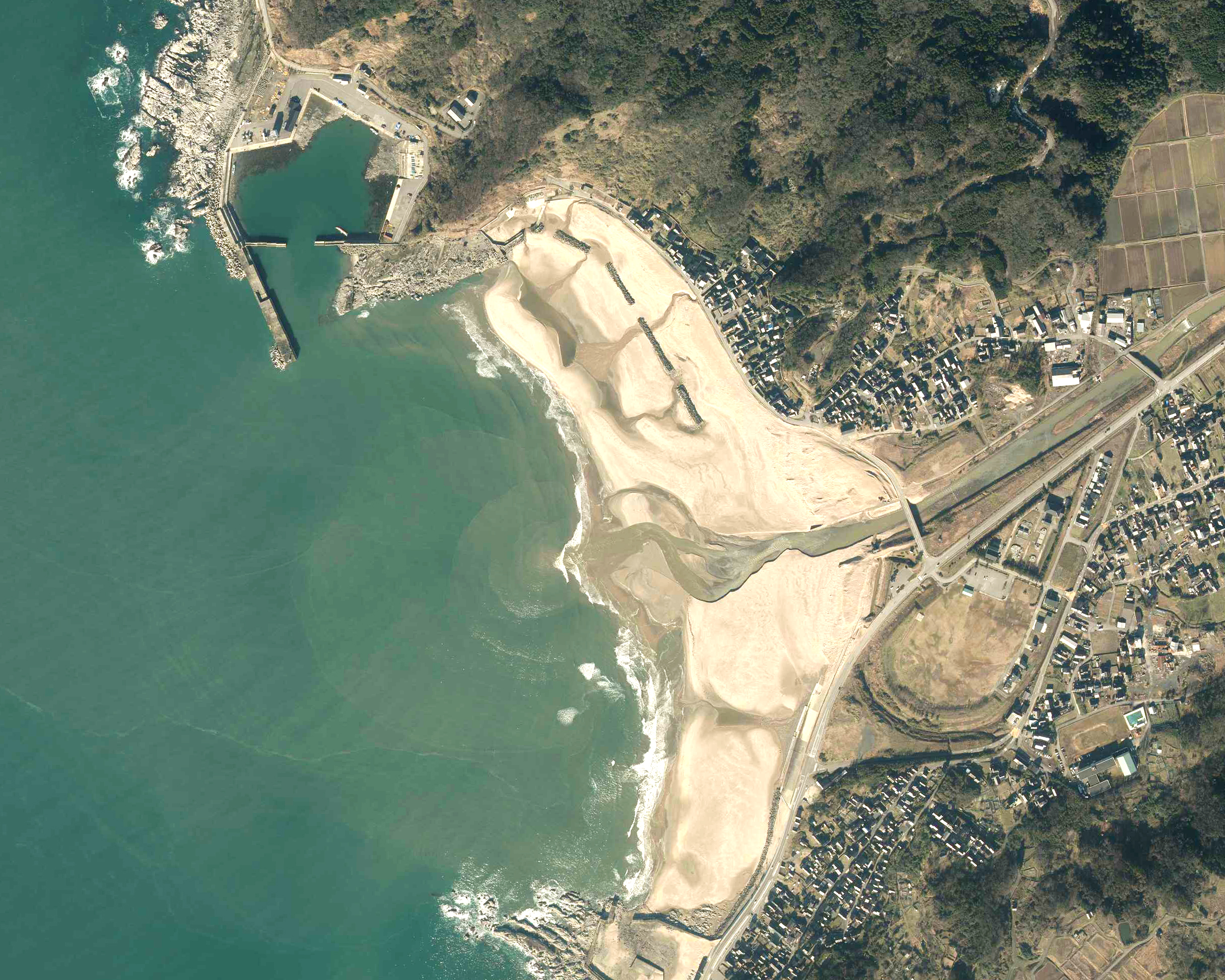
Photographed on 11 January 2024: levee is completely exposed on the raised beach

Across the mountainous region of the peninsula, landslides were widespread. There were also extensive slope failures, particularly in the northeastern part of the peninsula. The number of landslides was estimated at 1,000. At least nine landslide dams were discovered in the Wajima area on 9 January, which had the potential to cause debris avalanches. In Wajima, a landslide dam caused water to overflow downstream into fields, potentially causing a collapse. In Jōetsu, Niigata, a landslide measuring 16,000 m^{3} (570,000 cu ft) buried a section of National Route 8.

A scarp trending east–west across a zone 4 km (2.5 mi) long and 0.1–0.4 km (0.062–0.249 mi) wide occurred along the Wakayama River in Suzu. The maximum vertical offset was 2.2 m (7 ft 3 in) in Naka district, Wakayama town. These scarps did not display any observable horizontal displacement. It propagated through and displaced rice fields, roads and rivers among other features. The GSI said these scarps may represent a fold in response to compressive forces due to the geology of the area. However, they did not rule out the scarp being the toe of a landslide, though this is a less probable explanation.

Surveys by the Japan Coast Guard revealed a section of uplifted seafloor south of the active fault trace. The seabed north of the Noto Peninsula lies 40–90 m (130–300 ft) beneath the sea. The recent survey and survey results from the previous year suggested a 3 m (9.8 ft) uplift of the seafloor.

=== Intensity ===
The Japan Meteorological Agency said it recorded a maximum seismic intensity of 7 (Shindo 7), the highest level on its seismic intensity scale, the first time that an earthquake of that intensity had been observed in the country since 2018. It corresponded to a maximum Modified Mercalli intensity of X–XI (Extreme). The USGS assigned a maximum intensity of IX (Violent). The maximum intensity was reported in Shika and Wajima, Ishikawa Prefecture. Intensity 6+ was recorded in Nanao, Suzu, Noto and Anamizu. Intensity 6– was recorded in Nagaoka in Niigata Prefecture and in Ishikawa's Nakanoto. The earthquake was also felt by residents in Tokyo and across the Kanto Region and as far as Aomori Prefecture in the northern tip of Honshu to Kyushu in the south of the country. A peak ground acceleration of 2,826 gal was observed in Shika, which was close to that recorded during the 2011 Tōhoku earthquake which measured 2,934 gal. Due to the ground beneath Wajima and Anamizu comprising soft sediments, ground motions were amplified. However, the amplification was strongly influenced by soil softening processes directly caused by the strong shaking. This also affected the observed intensity in Anamizu, Wajima, Monzen, and Noto Island.

Locations with a seismic intensity of Shindo 5− and higher
Intensity	Prefecture	Locations
7	Ishikawa	Shika, Wajima
6+	Ishikawa	Anamizu, Nanao, Suzu, Noto
6−	Ishikawa	Nakanoto
6−	Niigata	Nagaoka
5+	Ishikawa	Hakui, Hōdatsushimizu, Kanazawa, Komatsu, Kaga, Kahoku, Nomi
5+	Niigata	Sanjō, Kashiwazaki, Mitsuke, Minamiuonuma, Kariwa, Itoigawa, Myōkō, Jōetsu, Chūō-ku, Minami-ku, Nishi-ku, Nishikan-ku, Tsubame, Aga, Sado
5+	Toyama	Toyama, Funahashi, Takaoka, Himi, Oyabe, Nanto, Imizu
5+	Fukui	Awara
5−	Ishikawa	Hakusan, Tsubata, Uchinada
5−	Niigata	Ojiya, Kamo, Tōkamachi, Izumozaki, Kita-ku, Higashi-ku, Kōnan-ku, Akiha-ku, Gosen, Agano
5−	Toyama	Namerikawa, Kurobe, Kamiichi, Tateyama, Asahi, Tonami
5−	Fukui	Fukui, Sakai
5−	Nagano	Nagano, Shinano, Sakae
5−	Gifu	Takayama, Hida

=== Long period ground motion ===
The JMA also reported that the Noto Region of Ishikawa Prefecture registered the highest possible Long Period Ground Motion (LPGM) intensity of 4.

Locations with LPGM Class of II or higher observed
Class	Prefecture	Locations
IV	Ishikawa	Noto Region
III	Ishikawa	Kaga Region
III	Toyama	Eastern and Western Toyama
III	Niigata	Jōetsu, Chūetsu, Kaetsu Regions
III	Nagano	Central Nagano
II	Akita	Northern Akita Coast
II	Yamagata	Shonai Region, Murayama Region, Okitama Region
II	Ibaraki	Southern Ibaraki
II	Saitama	Northern Saitama
II	Chiba	Northwestern and Northeastern Chiba
II	Tokyo	23 wards
II	Kanagawa	Eastern Kanagawa
II	Niigata	Sado Island
II	Fukui	Reihoku (Northern Fukui)
II	Nagano	Northern Nagano
II	Aichi	Western Aichi
II	Mie	Northern Mie
II	Osaka	Southern Osaka
II	Hyōgo	Southeastern Hyōgo
II	Wakayama	Northern Wakayama

=== Aftershocks ===
Map of earthquakes - USGS data (map data) JMA data (map data)

The earthquake generated aftershocks that extended 160 km (99 mi) along a northeast–southwest trend. The largest aftershocks were recorded beneath the peninsula. About 15 minutes after the mainshock, a M_{w} 6.1 event was recorded. Two M_{w} 6.2 and 6.0 aftershocks were recorded on 9 January and 1 June, respectively.

List of aftershocks with a seismic intensity of Shindo 5− and higher
Time (JST)	Epicenter	Magnitude (USGS)	Intensity (Shindo)	Depth	Notes
1 January 16:18:42	37.190°N 136.827°E	mb 6.2	5+	10 km (6 mi)	
1 January 16:56:48	37.300°N 136.888°E	M_{ww} 5.6	5+	10 km (6 mi) (USGS); 20 km (12 mi) (JMA)	
1 January 17:22:11	37.463°N 137.224°E	mb 4.9	5-	10 km (6 mi)	
1 January 18:03:49	37.534°N 137.419°E	mb 5.5	5-	10 km (6 mi) (USGS); 20 km (12 mi) (JMA)	
1 January 18:08:17	37.515°N 137.403°E	mb 5.6	5-	10 km (6 mi)	
1 January 18:40:00	37.148°N 136.656°E	mb 5.0	5-	10 km (6 mi)	
1 January 20:35:32	37.166°N 136.695°E	mb 4.6	5-	10 km (6 mi)	
2 January 10:17:31	37.247°N 136.769°E	M_{ww} 5.4	5-	6 km (4 mi) (USGS); 10 km (6 mi) (JMA)	
2 January 17:13:41	37.142°N 136.685°E	mb 4.7	5+	10.9 km (7 mi)	
3 January 02:21:47	37.480°N 137.319°E	M_{ww} 4.8	5+	10 km (6 mi)	
3 January 10:54:34	37.352°N 136.928°E	M_{ww} 5.3	5+	10 km (6 mi)	
6 January 05:26:51	37.223°N 136.827°E	M_{ww} 5.1	5+	10 km (6 mi)	
6 January 23:20:23	37.199°N 136.693°E	mb 4.5	6-	10 km (6 mi)	(Note: According to the JMA, this aftershock only lasted a few seconds and the measured intensities around the Shindo 6− point were much lower than what would be expected of an earthquake of that intensity. An investigation is ongoing.)
9 January 17:59:10	37.873°N 137.781°E	M_{ww} 5.9	5-	10 km (6 mi)	(Note: According to a report of the JMA, this aftershock caused a Tsunami Forecast, for waves up to 20 cm (7.9 in) in Ishikawa, Niigata and Sado Island areas.)
16 January 18:42:16	37.131°N 136.798°E	mb 4.7	5-	10 km (6 mi)	
2 June 06:31:38	37.457°N 137.239°E	M_{ww} 5.8	5+	4.8 km (3 mi)	

Number of aftershocks by magnitude (From 1 to 3 January)
Magnitude	Occurrences
M ≥ 6	1
6 > M ≥ 5	13
5 > M ≥ 4	141
4 > M ≥ 3	743
3 > M ≥ 2	2,203
2 > M ≥ 1	1,206
1 > M ≥ 0	14
Not rated	10
Total	4,331

Number of aftershocks by date (From 1 to 8 January)
Date (JST)	Noto region	Off the coast of the Noto Peninsula	Near Sado	Off the coast of central and southwestern Niigata Prefecture	Off the western coast of Ishikawa Prefecture	Total	Cumulative
1 January	404	176	67	24	3	674	674
2 January	1,091	584	250	83	22	2,030	2,704
3 January	862	429	234	67	35	1,627	4,331
4 January	699	325	159	51	16	1,250	5,581
5 January	496	234	108	60	16	914	6,495
6 January	444	185	114	33	20	796	7,291
7 January	410	153	82	36	12	693	7,984
8 January	369	134	60	30	5	598	8,582

== Tsunami ==
=== Japan ===
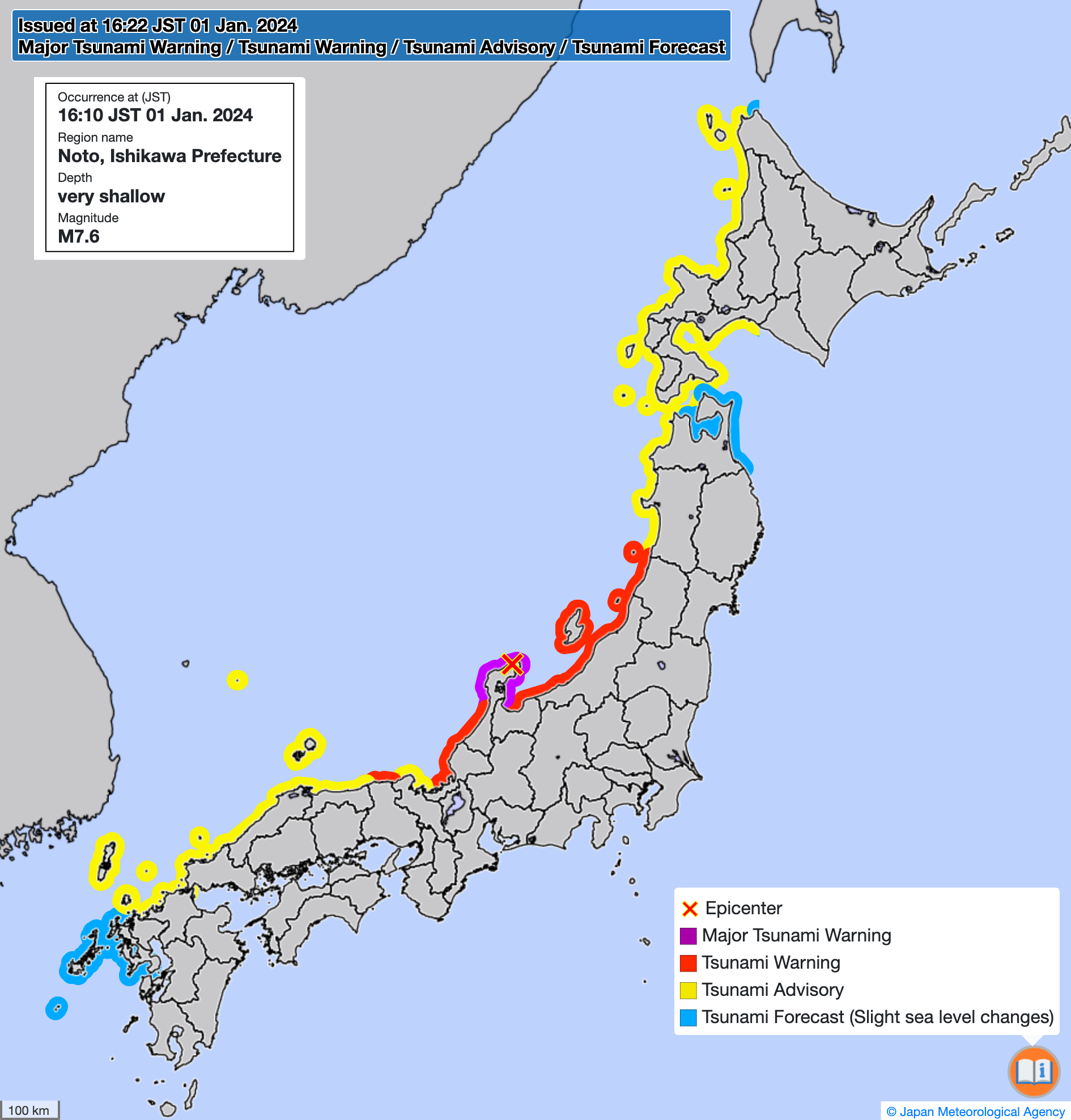
Map of Tsunami Warnings issued by the Japan Meteorological Agency at 1 January 2024 16:22 JST

Large parts of Japan's western coast, from Hokkaido to Nagasaki Prefectures were immediately placed under a tsunami warning after the earthquake struck, with evacuation orders issued in Ishikawa, Niigata, Toyama, and Yamagata prefectures. The earthquake triggered a major tsunami warning, the first one since the 2011 Tōhoku earthquake. Public broadcaster NHK said tsunami waves of 5 m (16 ft) could be expected. The Pacific Tsunami Warning Center said dangerous tsunami waves were possible within 300 km (190 mi) of the epicenter.

The evacuation orders covered 62,000 people, with 1,000 evacuees finding shelter at the Japan Air Self-Defense Force base in Wajima in Ishikawa Prefecture. The major tsunami warning was later downgraded to a tsunami warning at 20:30, about four hours after the earthquake. These tsunami warnings were later downgraded to advisories, which were eventually lifted at 10:00 on 2 January, about 18 hours after the earthquake.

On the peninsula's northern coast, about 370 hectares of land was inundated. The first waves were reported to have arrived at around 16:21, although a team of researchers from Tohoku University's International Research Institute of Disaster Science said the first waves reached the Noto Peninsula within a minute of the earthquake. Along the Noto Peninsula, the second wave was the largest and most destructive. In Suzu, the first waves were estimated to arrive one minute after the shock and two minutes later at Nanao. They also estimated Toyama was struck by the waves in about five minutes. The quicker-than-anticipated tsunami arrival meant people did not evacuate in time. Fumihiko Imamura, a member of the research team, said it may have been due to the close proximity of the fault to the coast or a possible submarine landslide in Toyama Bay. Tsunamis in the Sea of Japan have been observed to arrive faster than those along Japan's Pacific coast. Tsunami modelling executed by the University of Tokyo and Building Research Institute of Japan computed the tsunami to be 3.6 m (12 ft) in Suzu; 3 m (9.8 ft) in Noto; 2.5 m (8 ft 2 in) in Shika and 2 m (6 ft 7 in) in Jōetsu, Niigata.

Flooding by the tsunami exceeded 4 m (13 ft) along the east and western part of the peninsula. In Suzu, the highest waves exceeded 4.7 m (15 ft) at Misaki Town, destroying homes and damaging the seawall. At Shika's Kagami area, the tsunami was recorded at 5.1 m (17 ft). The highest tsunami was measured in Monzenmachi Kuroshima at Wajima with a run up height of 11.3 m (37 ft). This measurement was recorded from fishing gear and other marine debris swept onto a hill. A run-up of about 4.2 m (14 ft) was estimated at Shika based on the survey of warehouses and port facilities. Aerial photographs of Suzu suggested a wave height of 3 m (9.8 ft) above sea level; subsequent analysis indicated a wave of 4.5 m (15 ft) at Nanba, Misakimachi. Tsunami waves exceeding 1.2 m (4 ft) struck Wajima, however data from the tide gauge was incomplete as it was one of several tide gauges across the peninsula that stopped receiving information shortly after. A tide gauge at the Shika Nuclear Power Plant recorded a rise of 3 m (9.8 ft) in tide level at between 17:45 and 18:00. The plant's operator later said that a 4 m (13 ft) wave reached the facility, which was built at an elevation of 11 m (36 ft) above sea level and had a seawall measuring 4 m (13 ft) high, at 17:45, without causing damage.

A tsunami measuring 90 cm (35 in) struck Kanazawa, while a tsunami of 80 cm (31 in) struck Toyama Prefecture and Sakata, Yamagata Prefecture. Waves measuring 50 cm (20 in) were recorded in Nanao and Tsuruga while waves measuring 40 cm (16 in) were recorded at Kashiwazaki, Tobishima, and Sado Island. In Toyama city, a 0.5 m (1 ft 8 in) wave was reported. The tsunami was recorded in Tottori Prefecture with heights of 0.6 m (2 ft 0 in) in Sakaiminato and 0.2 m (7.9 in) in Iwami; in Toyooka, Hyōgo Prefecture, it reached 0.4 m (1 ft 4 in). A 0.4 m (1 ft 4 in) tsunami was recorded at the port area of Maizuru, Kyoto Prefecture. In Hokkaido, waves of up to 60 cm (24 in) were reported in Setana, while 50 cm (20 in) waves struck Okushiri Island.

At Funami Park, a public park 600 m (2,000 ft) from the Seki River mouth in Jōetsu, the tsunami had a height of 7.45 m (24.4 ft), the highest recorded in Niigata Prefecture. The tsunami swept people away at the entrance of a building and in the park. The locally high waves may be attributed to the seafloor bathymetry concentrating the tsunami at a specific location. Video footage in Jōetsu, Niigata showed the tsunami approaching the rivermouth at 16:35, crashing into embankments and causing seawater to overflow. Evidence of tsunami sediments and marine flora suggested the tsunami reached at least 5.5 km (3.4 mi) upstream from the river mouth. It also flowed along the Hokura River for 1.6 km (0.99 mi) starting from its confluence at the Seki River. Wave heights along the coast southwest of the rivermouth were between 1.5 m (4 ft 11 in) and 5.0 m (16.4 ft). Northeast of the rivermouth, they ranged from 1.8 m (5 ft 11 in) to 4.0 m (13.1 ft). At Naoetsu beach, tsunami debris indicated 2 m (6 ft 7 in) waves struck while 3 km (1.9 mi) to the west in Tanhama beach, waves were estimated at 4 m (13 ft).

=== Damage ===
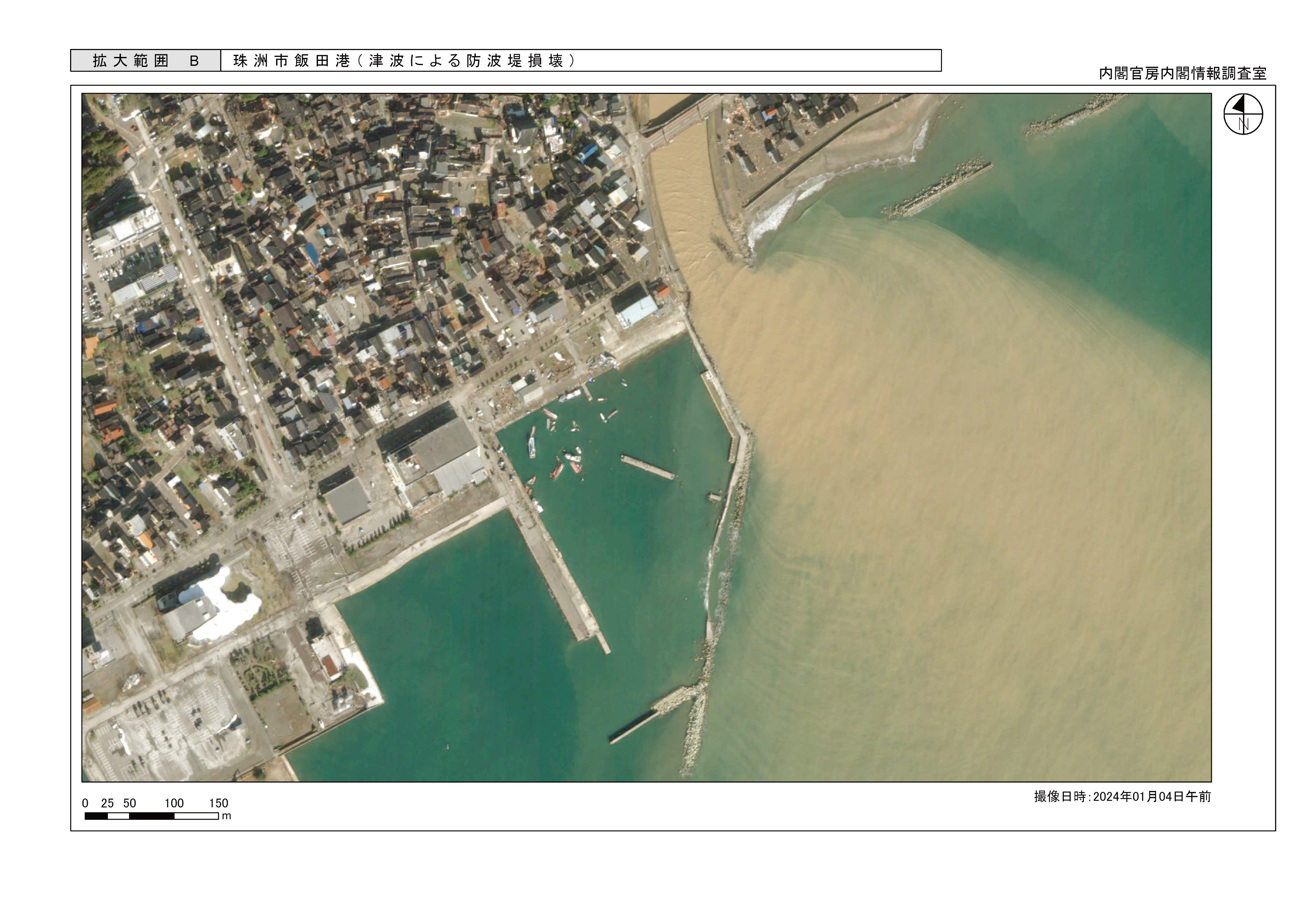
Damage in the port area of Suzu

In northeastern Suzu, the tsunami was said to have arrived a minute following the earthquake. Homes were washed off their foundations and some were driven further inland. At least two people were killed by the tsunami in Ukai Horyumachi District, however the total tsunami death toll may have been at least 26 including 24 in Ukai Horyumachi. The tsunami in Ukai Horyumachi reached up to 5.45 m (17.9 ft) and almost every building in the town within a block of the coast was swept away or damaged beyond repair. The combined effects of the earthquake and tsunami damaged or destroyed 90 percent of the town's buildings. In Suzu City, many fishing vessels capsized or were carried onto land. Building collapses and overturned cars were observed from a news helicopter flyover of the city. A resident recalled tsunami waves washing over a road, picking up cars and debris. Ishikawa Prefecture's governor, Hiroshi Hase, said the tsunami flooded the Iida Port area by up to 100 m (330 ft) inland. A study conducted by professor Shunichi Koshimura of Tohoku University found that the damage in Suzu was exacerbated by the seabed terrain of Toyama Bay.

In Shika, the tsunami waves reached the port at 17:40; it had a 4.2 m (14 ft) run-up and the fishing port. Tsunami observations in the peninsula were made difficult by the coastal uplift raising parts of the coast by up to 4.1 m (13 ft) and extending the coastline further seawards.

In the Shiromaru area of Noto, homes were destroyed and a fire was started. About 4.6 ha (11 acres) of coastline was damaged. The tsunami in Shiromaru reached 5.58 m (18.3 ft), one of the highest run ups recorded in the peninsula. Heavy damage was recorded in the district with many houses swept away or destroyed. Most coastal homes that weren't destroyed were damaged beyond repair and later demolished. Out of 80 occupied households in Shiromaru, 60 were severely damaged by the tsunami and fires.

On Hegurajima, the tsunami swept away homes and disabled basic services. Three people were stranded on the island prior to rescue two weeks later. A run-up of 6.28 m (20.6 ft) on the island was determined, one of the highest recorded in Ishikawa Prefecture. In Kurikawashiri, Noto, inundation was observed 700 m (2,300 ft) inland.

Misaki Town, in Suzu City, had one of the highest recorded run up on the Noto Peninsula. Located on the tip of the peninsula, close to the rupture, waves up to 5.64 m (18.5 ft) washed away several waterfront homes. Despite severe coastal damage and high run ups, no injuries or fatalities from the tsunami were recorded in Misaki. Extensive evacuation drills that had taken place multiple times a year in Misaki since the 2011 Tōhoku earthquake and tsunami, saved lives when the Noto tsunami hit.

In Monzenmachi Kuroshima, Wajima City, a maximum run up of 11.3 m (37 ft) was recorded. Despite the much higher waves than areas on the coast of Suzu City, tsunami damage in the Wajima region was comparatively light. This is because communities built along the West coast of the peninsula are built on stepped hills, with almost all buildings a notable distance above sea level. The regions with the highest run up also have a much lower population than the flat plains that the tsunami damaged towns on the East Coast of the peninsula are built on. The East coast also does not have significant sea defenses.

In Jōetsu, Niigata, the locally-high run-up exceeding 7 m (23 ft) flooded 15 homes along the Seki River bank. Beach houses and other buildings were also swept away. Ten fishing vessels capsized in the Ogata Fishing Port area. Containers were also washed away and warehouses storing machinery were flooded. The Ministry of Land, Infrastructure, Transport and Tourism (MLIT) assessed that the tsunami inundated up to 190 ha (470 acres) of land in Suzu, Noto and Shika, and damaged breakwaters in at least seven beaches. At least 120 maritime vessels were reported to have been sunk or capsized from the tsunami, while at least 70 percent of ports in Ishikawa Prefecture sustained damage. The Ministry of Agriculture, Forestry and Fisheries said that 60 out of 69 fishing ports in Ishikawa Prefecture were affected by the tsunami, 18 of which were completely unusable and nine others partially functional.

=== Elsewhere along the Sea of Japan ===
The Korea Meteorological Administration warned that the coastlines of Gangwon Province and Pohang in South Korea could experience a rise in sea levels. Waves of 0.3 m (1 ft) were anticipated along the nation's east coast from 18:29 to 19:17 local time. A 0.45 m (1 ft 6 in) tsunami was later reported to have occurred in Gangwon. A 0.85 m (3 ft) wave reportedly struck Mukho at around 20:00 local time. Tsunamis with heights of 0.66 m (2 ft 2 in) were recorded in Uljin; 0.45 m (1 ft 6 in) in Sokcho and 0.39 m (1 ft 3 in) in Gangneung. It is thought to be the first tsunami of over 0.5 m (1 ft 8 in) observed in the country since 1993. According to Yonhap News Agency, citing North Korean state radio, a tsunami warning was issued with waves of 2.08 m (6 ft 10 in) potentially hitting the country's east coast.

Warnings were also issued in Russia for tsunami waves estimated to reach 1 m (3 ft), particularly along the west coast of Sakhalin Island, where evacuations were said to be conducted, although Russia later said that no evacuations were taking place there. Tsunami warnings were also declared in parts of Primorsky Krai, Khabarovsk Krai, Vladivostok and Nakhodka. The Emergencies Ministry of Russia said "response teams are ready to deal with the possible consequences of a tsunami." Officials in Vladivostok later said "no tsunami was observed" while in Nakhodka, "the tsunami passed almost unnoticed." A 0.63 m (2 ft 1 in) wave was observed at Preobrazhenie in Primorsky Krai; at Kholmsk, it measured 0.18 m (7.1 in).

== Casualties ==
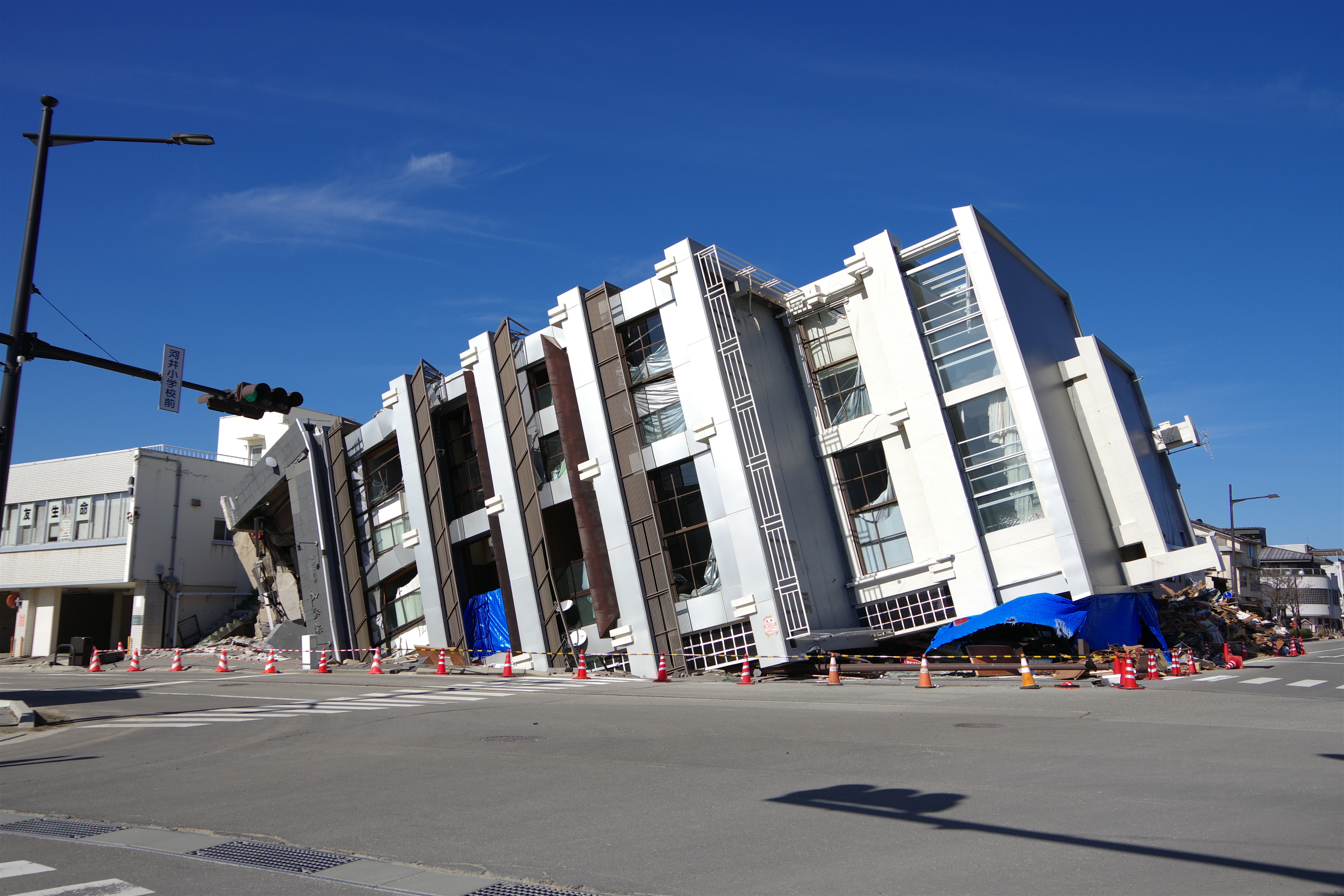
Tipped-over building in Wajima(from above to below)

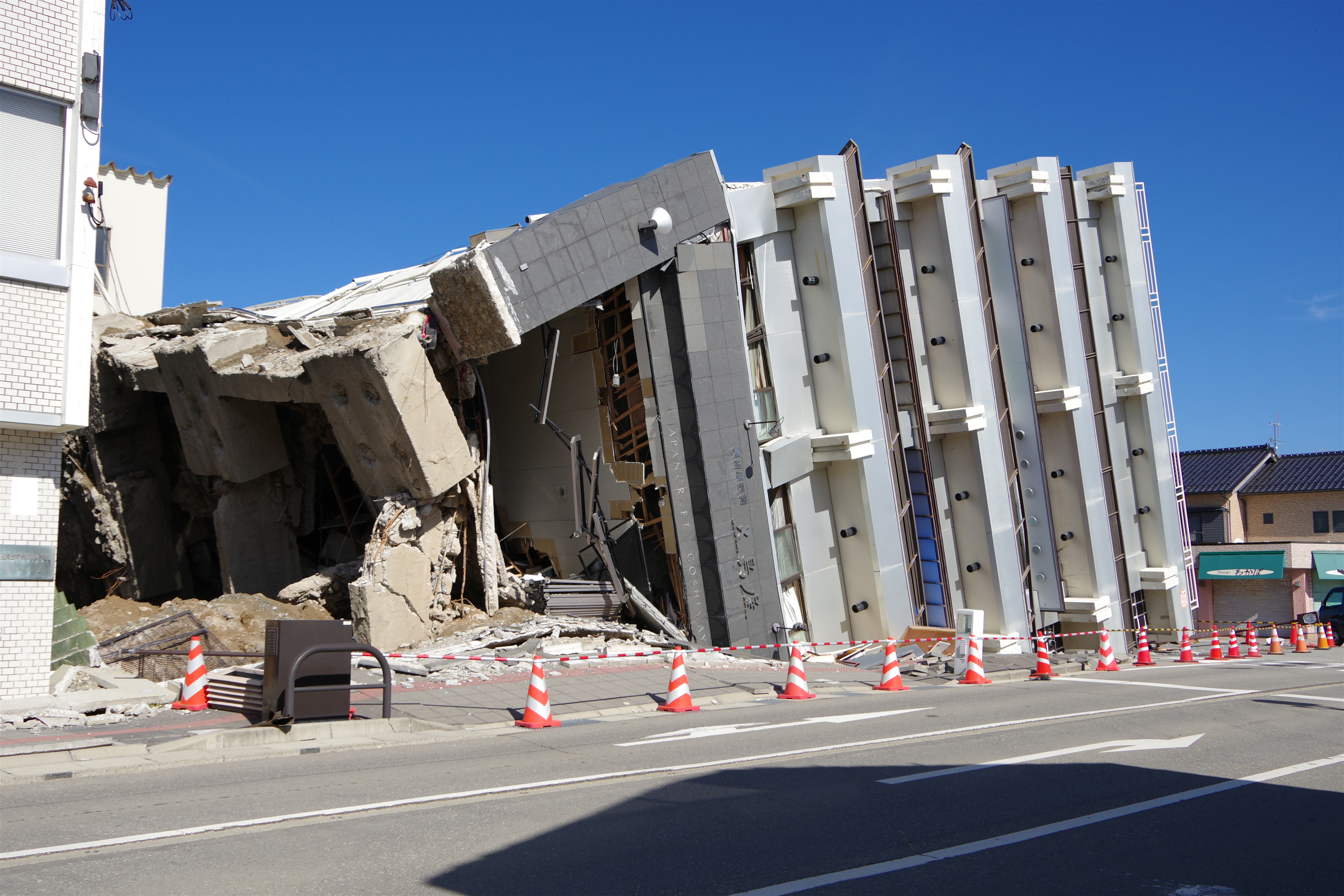

The earthquake killed 761 people, including 533 people who died in the aftermath. A majority of direct deaths were due to collapsed homes. At least 747 deaths were confirmed in Ishikawa Prefecture, including 248 in Wajima, 192 in Suzu, 87 in Noto, 84 in Nanao, 57 in Anamizu, 28 in Shika, 7 in Hakui, 6 in Uchinada, 3 in Nakanoto, and 1 each in Kanazawa, Hakusan and Komatsu. Eight people died in Toyama Prefecture: 4 in Himi, 2 in Takaoka and 1 each in Toyama City and Imizu. Six more died in Niigata Prefecture: four in Niigata City and two in Jōetsu. Additionally, there were 25 deaths from landslides and two more were killed by the tsunami, although the total number of tsunami deaths may be 26.

At least 1,277 people were injured in Ishikawa, 401 of them seriously, and as of 30 April 2026, two people remained missing. Information provided by the National Police Agency following autopsies found that 92 of the victims were crushed to death, 49 died of suffocation or respiratory failure, 32 died from hypothermia, and three died of burns. Many of those killed were the elderly.

By June 2024, there were 233 applications to local cities and towns to review deaths and register them as disaster-related. Three meetings have been held as of June 2024; the first meeting in May resulted in 30 new cases being registered as related deaths. On 18 June, city officials were recommended to certify 22 new deaths. On 25 June, a joint panel discussion by the Ishikawa prefectural government and town officials recommended that 18 additional deaths be registered as disaster-related. If these additional cases are certified, it would bring the projected total death toll to 299. Five more applications read on the same day were subjected to further review.

In an assessment of 115 indirect deaths released in December 2024, "distress after the earthquake and fear of aftershocks" was cited as the cause in 89 fatalities, followed by "severed lifelines such as electricity and water" at 53 cases, and "life in evacuation centers" at 37 cases; 200 additional cases were still subject to review.

== Impact ==
The Japanese government estimated the total cost of damage in Ishikawa, Toyama and Niigata to be ¥1.1-2.6 trillion (US$7.4-17.6 billion). Most of the cost was attributed to damaged homes, roads, ports and other infrastructure. Ishikawa Prefecture alone accounted for between ¥0.9–1.3 trillion (US$5.7–8.3 billion). Damage was especially severe in Wajima and Suzu. At least 780 people across 30 districts in remote villages were isolated due to damaged roads and landslides and required helicopters to be reached. Many of the collapsed houses in Wajima were traditional wooden structures that were built prior to current building regulations that were imposed in 1981, which was equivalent to around 56.4 percent of the town's buildings. Information from 2018 also revealed that more than half of buildings in Wajima did not follow these regulations. In Suzu, many buildings were built before the enactment of modern building codes in 1950, while in 2019, only 51 percent of the town's houses were deemed earthquake-resistant, compared with 87 percent for the entire country. Around 66 percent of residences in Suzu were wooden homes that were built before 1980, while 61 percent of buildings in Noto were found to have been built before 1981.

At least 155,160 structures, including 116,615 houses, 443 public buildings and 38,102 of unspecified use, were damaged across Ishikawa, including 24,891 which were partially or completely destroyed. In Wajima, 6,282 homes were fully or partially destroyed and 4,352 others were damaged, along with 11,709 buildings. Ninety percent of the fatalities there were attributed to falling debris from collapsed houses. A fire occurred in the city at around 17:00. Due to damaged roads, firefighters were unable to extinguish the flames. The fire consumed an estimated 200 buildings, including many homes, and the Asaichi morning market, a 1,000-year-old shopping district and tourist attraction that hosted about 200 stalls. An area of up to 48,000 m^{2} (520,000 sq ft) was affected by the fire, which experts said was exacerbated by the loss of water supply and the tsunami warning, which prevented firefighters from responding immediately to the blaze. The Fire and Disaster Management Agency later said that the fire may have been caused by electrical wiring that had been damaged by the earthquake. At least 518 people were injured in the city. In Suzu, there were 252 injuries and up to 90 percent of the buildings were affected. In the city, 3,871 homes were severely damaged or destroyed and 1,748 were partially damaged. Fires also caused severe damage to many buildings. Damage and casualties in the city were exacerbated by previous earthquakes, most notably a M_{JMA}6.5 event in May 2023 which damaged or destroyed a quarter of Suzu's houses. Many people were still residing in these damaged houses at the time of the earthquake. The mayor of Suzu said about 4,000 to 5,000 households of the city's 6,000 were no longer habitable, adding that damage was "catastrophic".

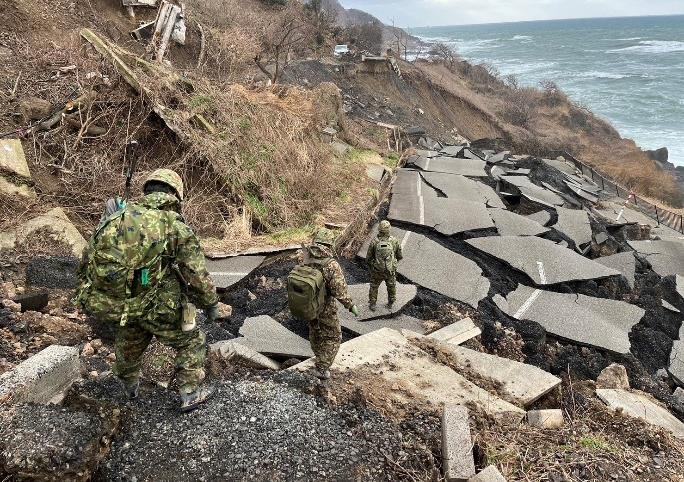
Ground failure along the coast

The Ishikawa Nanao Police Station said collapsed homes trapped people before they were rescued. A spokesperson at Wajima Municipal Hospital said people had broken bones or were injured by falling objects. At least 116 people were injured and 7,462 houses in Shika were damaged, including 3,032 which collapsed or sustained severe damage. In Anamizu, 258 people were injured, 387 houses collapsed, 1,289 were partially destroyed and 1,647 were damaged; a landslide in the town killed 16 people and destroyed three houses.

In Noto, 58 people were injured, 1,319 homes were completely or partially destroyed and 4,512 others were damaged, along with 4,215 buildings. Five of the affected houses were destroyed by fires. The tsunami also washed debris onto streets. Operations of the Noto Airport were suspended after five cracks as long as 10 m (33 ft) appeared on the runway; the terminal of the airport also sustained damage. Access roads leading to the airport were blocked, while about 500 passengers were left stranded inside the facility, which was expected to be closed until 4 January. Access to the northern part of the Noto Peninsula was limited by a damaged road. In Nanao, 39 people were injured, 5,616 houses fully or partially collapsed and 11,504 others were damaged. Noto Island was isolated after the bridge linking it to the town was closed. In Kanazawa, nine people were injured and 20,667 buildings were damaged, including 285 which collapsed or sustained severe damage.

In Niigata Prefecture, six people were killed, 60 others were injured, 4,271 buildings collapsed or were badly affected and 21,192 others were partially damaged, with 18,814 homes affected in Niigata City alone; 44 areas of Nishi Ward had liquefaction reported. On Sado Island, four buildings were razed, 31 were partially destroyed and 482 were damaged. In Toyama Prefecture, eight people were killed, and 58 others were injured, 14 of them seriously. Eight of the injuries occurred after the ceiling of a pachinko parlor collapsed in Toyama City. Two residents of the prefecture were also killed in Ishikawa. At least 1,066 houses collapsed or were severely damaged and 21,748 others were partially damaged, mostly in the cities of Himi, Takaoka and Imizu. In Fukui Prefecture, six people sustained minor injuries, 12 houses partially collapsed and 830 others were damaged, including 45 in Awara. Five injuries were also reported in Osaka, two in Hyōgo, and one each in Gifu and Aichi. In Nagano Prefecture, 21 houses were damaged.

Cracked roads and broken water mains were reported in the cities of Himi and Oyabe, Toyama Prefecture. Residents of Himi experienced water outages lasting nearly two weeks, with orders to conserve water lasting until February. In Toyama prefecture, underground snow-removal equipment for city roads was damaged in multiple areas, resulting in the deployment of snowplows and other equipment following heavy snowfall on 23 January. Liquefaction occurred in Uozu and in Niigata city; sewer pipes also ruptured and many homes were left without water. Thirty homes in Nishi-ku were damaged. The Onohiyoshi Shrine in Kanazawa also sustained damage. A landslide struck the main expressway between Toyama and Kanazawa, ripping apart several hundred meters of roadway. Four houses along a hill fell over as the land under them collapsed in the eastern part of Kanazawa. Sections of Japan National Route 8 was buried by landslides in Jōetsu, while track foundations caved in at the JR Echigo Line. A bridge along the Kurobe Gorge Railway, a popular tourist line, was damaged due to falling rocks. Cracks also appeared at the Nōetsu Expressway.

Around 260 convenience stores in the affected areas belonging to 7-Eleven and Family Mart were closed, while deliveries were delayed due to road closures. Japan Post also suspended services to the Noto Peninsula until 12 January due to road closures. NTT Docomo, Rakuten Mobile, Softbank and KDDI reported telecommunications and internet service disruptions in Ishikawa and Niigata prefectures, while NTT West said its facilities were damaged by the earthquake. At Shika Nuclear Power Plant, an explosion occurred near the power transformer of the No. 2 reactor, while the transformer at the No. 1 reactor was rendered inoperable due to an oil spill. The site's 4 m (13 ft) high seawall was found to have tilted by around several centimeters following the earthquake. At the Kashiwazaki-Kariwa Nuclear Power Plant in Niigata prefecture, water spilled from the fuel pools of two reactors due to the force of the earthquake. Traditional industries were also affected, with the Ishikawa Sake Brewers Association saying the earthquake left all 11 manufacturers in the Oku-Noto region, which includes Wajima and Suzu, unable to operate, with five of them suffering complete destruction of their facilities.

At least 36,000 households and 19 medical facilities lost power following the earthquake and more than 110,000 households were left without water. By the morning of 3 January, the number of households without power had dropped to approximately 33,900. A month after the earthquake, water shortages continued to affect about 37,000 households, with full restoration of services not expected until April. In Shika, water was being rationed daily at six litres per person following the earthquake.

The Ministry of Education, Culture, Sports, Science and Technology reported that 276 educational facilities had been damaged by the earthquake, particularly in Niigata, Ishikawa, Toyama, Fukui and Shiga prefectures. It also said 39 schools in four prefectures had been converted to evacuation shelters. The ministry also reported damage to 20 cultural sites in Toyama and Niigata prefectures. Several stone lanterns collapsed at the Zuiryū-ji temple in Takaoka, which is a designated National Treasure, while a slope collapsed at the Sado mine. About 350 people across evacuation centers were infected by COVID-19 or the common flu, while at least 40 cases of gastrointestinal illnesses such as norovirus were detected. In Suzu, a 90-year-old woman was rescued from a collapsed house after 124 hours.

The KAGRA Gravitational-wave observatory in the northernmost part of Gifu Prefecture, which was in the process of upgrading its systems for the fourth observing run, suffered damage to the instruments and was forced to delay its planned Spring 2024 return to operations in order to assess and repair the damage.

A review conducted after the earthquake found that Ishikawa Prefecture's disaster preparedness plan had been insufficient to handle the event. It found that the plan had not been significantly updated since 1997 and made only provisions for a magnitude 7.0 earthquake that would be localized in scope and classified as a low-level disaster with only three deaths, 120 destroyed buildings and 2,781 evacuees. Exactly one year after the earthquake, it was revealed the Japanese government estimated only 40 direct deaths from the earthquake.

The governor of Ishikawa Prefecture, Hiroshi Hase, said that the earthquake had produced at least 2.4 million tons of waste, equivalent to seven-years' worth of waste produced in the prefecture, with 60 percent of it originating in Suzu, Wajima, Noto and Anamizu, which was also equivalent to 60 years' worth of waste produced in these towns.

On 3 June 2024, a magnitude M_{JMA}6.0 (M_{w}5.8) aftershock struck the Noto Peninsula, destroying five houses in Wajima and injuring three people, including a woman who broke her leg after being startled by an earthquake alert in Tsubata and another person in Namerikawa, Toyama who sustained injuries to his head and hips while evacuating.

Casualties and damage by prefecture
Prefecture	Area	Fatalities		Injuries	Housing Damage			Max. Shindo
Prefecture	Area	Direct	Indirect	Injuries	Fully Collapsed	Half Collapsed	Partially Damaged	Max. Shindo
Ishikawa	Anamizu	20	37	258	387	1,289	1,647	6+
Ishikawa	Hakui	1	6	7	62	488	3,440	5+
Ishikawa	Hakusan	-	1	2	-	-	1,885	5-
Ishikawa	Hōdatsushimizu	-	-	-	12	79	1,787	5+
Ishikawa	Kaga	-	-	-	14	54	7,121	5+
Ishikawa	Kahoku	-	-	-	9	248	3,427	5+
Ishikawa	Kanazawa	-	1	9	32	253	20,382	5+
Ishikawa	Kawakita	-	-	-	-	-	69	4
Ishikawa	Komatsu	-	1	2	1	80	11,529	5+
Ishikawa	Nakanoto	-	3	6	56	912	3,379	6−
Ishikawa	Nanao	5	79	39	536	5,080	11,504	6+
Ishikawa	Nomi	-	-	1	1	13	3,133	5+
Ishikawa	Nonoichi	-	-	1	-	-	1,531	4
Ishikawa	Noto	2	85	58	294	1,025	4,512	6+
Ishikawa	Shika	2	26	116	562	2,470	4,419	7
Ishikawa	Suzu	97	95	252	1,756	2,115	1,748	6+
Ishikawa	Tsubata	-	-	2	9	83	3,511	5-
Ishikawa	Uchinada	-	6	6	124	565	2,337	5-
Ishikawa	Wajima	101	147	518	2,311	3,971	4,352	7
Subtotal		228	490	1,277	6,166	18,725	91,713	7
Toyama	Asahi	-	-	3	-	-	144	4
Toyama	Funahashi	-	-	-	-	-	33	5+
Toyama	Himi	-	3	11	232	504	6,037	5+
Toyama	Imizu	-	1	7	14	64	3,337	5+
Toyama	Kamiichi	-	-	-	-	-	155	5-
Toyama	Kurobe	-	-	8	-	-	248	5-
Toyama	Namerikawa	-	-	-	-	-	212	5-
Toyama	Nanto	-	-	-	-	-	265	5+
Toyama	Nyūzen	-	-	-	-	-	72	4
Toyama	Oyabe	-	-	2	10	40	1,829	5+
Toyama	Takaoka	-	2	6	-	152	5,338	5+
Toyama	Tateyama	-	-	-	-	-	84	5-
Toyama	Tonami	-	-	1	-	-	203	5-
Toyama	Toyama	-	1	18	2	49	3,685	5+
Toyama	Uozu	-	-	2	-	-	109	4
Subtotal		-	7	58	258	809	21,751	5+
Niigata	Aga	-	-	-	-	-	8	5+
Niigata	Agano	-	-	-	-	-	214	5-
Niigata	Gosen	-	-	1	-	-	495	5-
Niigata	Jōetsu	-	2	6	2	46	1,305	5+
Niigata	Kamo	-	-	-	-	-	58	5-
Niigata	Kariwa	-	-	-	-	-	60	5+
Niigata	Kashiwazaki	-	-	3	3	22	843	5+
Niigata	Itoigawa	-	-	4	-	5	669	5+
Niigata	Izumozaki	-	-	-	-	-	12	5-
Niigata	Mitsuke	-	-	2	-	-	274	5+
Niigata	Murakami	-	-	-	-	-	8	4
Niigata	Minamiuonuma	-	-	-	-	-	4	5+
Niigata	Myōkō	-	-	-	-	-	25	5+
Niigata	Nagaoka	-	-	4	-	7	724	6−
Niigata	Niigata	-	4	28	102	4,040	14,672	5+
Niigata	Ojiya	-	-	3	-	-	26	5-
Niigata	Sado	-	-	-	4	31	482	5+
Niigata	Sanjō	-	-	3	-	6	485	5+
Niigata	Seirō	-	-	-	-	1	24	4
Niigata	Shibata	-	-	-	-	-	32	4
Niigata	Tainai	-	-	-	-	-	9	4
Niigata	Tōkamachi	-	-	-	-	-	37	5-
Niigata	Tsubame	-	-	-	-	2	722	5+
Niigata	Tsunan	-	-	-	-	-	1	4
Niigata	Yahiko	-	-	-	-	-	1	4
Subtotal		-	6	54	111	4,160	21,192	6−
Total		228	504	1,395	6,526	23,694	134,656	7
Total		732		1,395	6,526	23,694	134,656	7

== Response ==
=== Government response ===
Prime Minister Fumio Kishida announced the establishment of a special emergency center to gather and disseminate information on the earthquake and tsunami. Defense minister Minoru Kihara ordered the Japan Self-Defense Forces (JSDF) to assist in rescue efforts. He later announced the deployment of 2,000 JSDF personnel to the affected region, with 8,500 others on standby. About 20 JSDF aircraft were also dispatched to survey the damage. An additional 2,000 firefighters and 1,000 police officers were also deployed to assist in rescue operations. About 3,000 rescuers were sent to the Noto Peninsula alone. By 4 January, at least 150 people had been rescued, while at least 2,000 of the 10,000 evacuees from Wajima had received humanitarian aid.

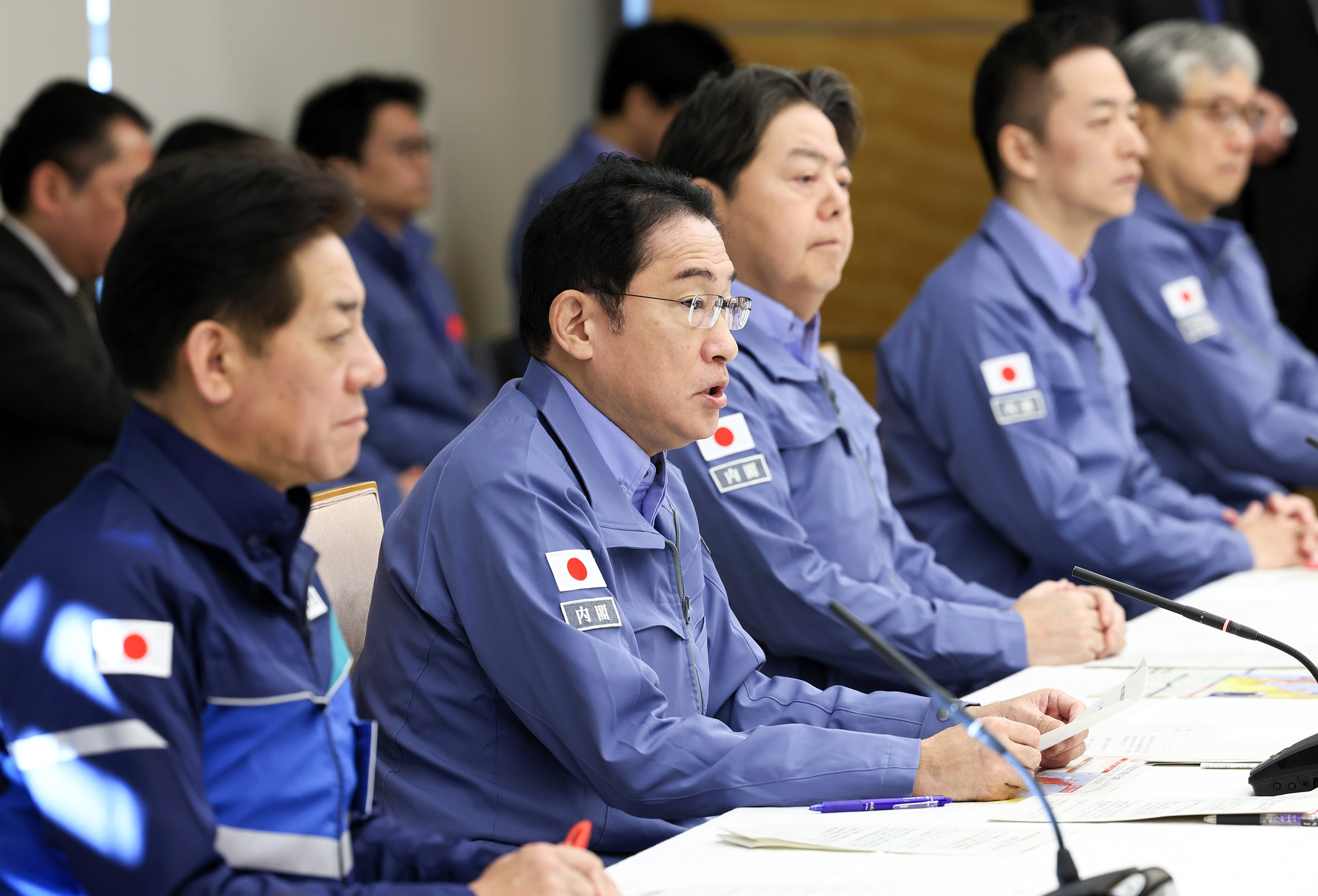
Prime Minister Fumio Kishida led the government response to the earthquake.

The Japanese government announced that it would allocate 4 billion yen ($28 million) from reserve funds to use in disaster relief efforts and increased the number of JSDF personnel involved in the response to 6,300. Defence Minister Kihara added that UH60JA helicopters were to be used in relief efforts, in their first major deployment since the 2023 Miyakojima helicopter crash in April. The Japanese government also announced that families whose houses were completely destroyed or severely damaged would receive aid amounting to 3 million yen ($20,000). Kishida later said that the government would allocate a total of 100 billion yen ($690 million) in reconstruction efforts and increase its reserve funds to $6.9 billion in the upcoming annual budget to ensure support for recovery efforts.

Ishikawa, Niigata, Toyama and Fukui prefectures requested financial support for 47 municipalities under the Disaster Relief Act, under which the national government is expected to cover 50 to 90 percent of expenses for disaster response and rehabilitation. The Japanese health ministry also instructed hospitals to offer health insurance coverage to patients affected by the quake, including those without insurance certificates and opened a telephone interpreting service in 23 languages to help medical workers handle foreign patients in the affected areas. Authorities in Ishikawa prefecture also opened an email help line to assist affected residents and tourists. By May, the number of displaced had fallen to 4,606, while about 3,780 households remained without water. As of December 2024, more than 200 people remained in shared emergency shelters.

On 4 January, the Japan Coast Guard began searching its coast with an aircraft and patrol boat for people missing; presumably swept away by the tsunami. At least one person was declared missing from the tsunami. At least two people were rescued after the expiration of the 72-hour survival window in Wajima on 4 January. Large holes in roads and landslides made rescue efforts challenging four days after the earthquake. Snowy weather conditions also affected rescue efforts, with snowfall reaching 10 cm (3.9 in) in several areas and raising concerns of additional building collapses. Snowfall significantly affected rescuers' ability to deliver supplies to isolated villages and recover survivors. Power was also cut due to snow, disabling cell phones.

By 3 January, about 31,800 people were living in shelters following the earthquake, with about 27,700 sheltering in 336 evacuation centers in Ishikawa prefecture alone. Following reports of deaths at evacuation centers, several vulnerable evacuees were evacuated to other prefectures, with at least 30 people being transferred to medical facilities in Aichi Prefecture. The government said it had secured about 6,500 public housing units for evacuees to resettle across the country. The construction of temporary housing began on 12 January with 115 home units in Wajima and Suzu. Sixty units in Noto and Anamizu were also scheduled for construction on 15 January. A month after the earthquake, around 14,000 people remained displaced due to the disaster and about 2,867 people continued to live in damaged homes.

Local authorities announced plans to transfer students from schools in Wajima that had been converted to evacuation centers to schools in Hakusan and Kanazawa, followed by around 140 junior high school students from Suzu and Noto. Fifty students from a high school in Wajima were transferred to Kai, Yamanashi prefecture, with 600 others expected to arrive in April. Schools in some of the affected areas resumed on 15 January, along with garbage-collection services in Wajima. At least 44 schools in the affected areas remain closed as of 22 January but gradually reopened, with the remaining seven schools reopening in Wajima on 6 February. Applicants from Ishikawa Prefecture who were unable to take the Common Test for University Admissions held on 13–14 January due to the earthquake were allowed to undertake makeup examinations scheduled later in the month.

On 14 January, Kishida made his first visit to the disaster zone, where he held an aerial inspection over Ishikawa Prefecture and visited evacuation centers in Wajima and Suzu. On 25 January, the Japanese government unveiled a disaster recovery package in which residents were exempted from the cost of demolishing their homes and would receive around $20,000 to rebuild destroyed or severely damaged houses. It also called for the construction of wooden and conventional makeshift prefabricated dwellings. The government also pledged to shoulder up to 75 percent of costs in resuming operations at small and midsized businesses, with a limit of $10 million. It also pledged to support the replacement of affected agricultural machinery and fishing boats, as well as the recovery of traditional industries in the area such as Wajima-nuri lacquerware. The government also said it was planning to shoulder half the hotel fees for tourists in the Hokuriku Region with a limit of $135 per stay to promote tourism. The government said the package would be funded by the national budget's reserve funds in the 2023 and 2024 fiscal years.

=== Energy infrastructure ===
Kansai Electric Power Company, Tokyo Electric Power Company and Hokuriku Electric Power Company said they were inspecting their nuclear power plants for abnormalities. Both the Kansai and Hokuriku Electric Power Companies initially said no abnormalities were reported, with the reactors at the latter's Shika Nuclear Power Plant in Ishikawa Prefecture having been closed for inspections at the time of the earthquake. However, a cumulative oil spillage of 19,800 liters at two of the reactors was later revealed, partially impacting the plant's ability to receive power from external sources. Hokuriku Electric Power Company subsequently said that repairs at the facility would take more than six months. Eighteen of the Shika nuclear plant's 116 radiation monitoring posts were also rendered offline by the earthquake. Ground deformation, including subsidence, was also recorded in 80 locations inside the plant compound.

The Japanese Nuclear Regulation Authority (NRA) also found no irregularities in power plants along the Sea of Japan coastline, but ordered Hokuriku Electric Power Company to conduct further study of the earthquake's impact on the Shika Nuclear Power Plant. Hokuriku Electric Power Company also shut down two generators at its Nanao Ota thermal power plant in Nanao.

By 29 January, electricity had been restored to 80 percent of households in Wajima and Suzu, and 99 percent in Nanao, Noto, Anamizu and Shika. Ishikawa's governor Hiroshi Hase said power was expected to be fully restored in the prefecture by 31 January.

Concerns over the safety of the Shika nuclear power plant and nearby nuclear facilities led to residents living near the power plants to submit a petition to the NRA on 2 February asking for a suspension in the screening process undertaken prior to reopening the Shika power plant until damage at the facility is fully examined and safety measures are implemented.

Minor damage was recorded at the Shika Nuclear Power Plant following a M_{JMA}6.0 (M_{w}5.8) aftershock on 3 June 2024.

=== Transport ===
Shinkansen services were suspended in central and eastern parts of Japan following the earthquake, stranding at least 1,400 passengers aboard four stalled trains between Toyama and Kanazawa for about 11 hours. Local train services were also halted for up to 24 hours following the earthquake, stranding about 1,000 passengers aboard express trains. Shinkansen services resumed in the afternoon of 2 January. Several major highways in the affected areas were also closed. All Nippon Airways and Japan Airlines cancelled flights to Toyama, Ishikawa, and Niigata prefectures for the rest of 1 January. Japan Airlines subsequently announced additional flights to Komatsu Airport in Ishikawa Prefecture and Niigata Airport on 2 January.

By the morning of 3 January, Japan Railways partially resumed services, however, some local lines remained suspended, including the Nanao Line and the Noto Railway. The MLIT confirmed that Noto Airport would remain closed until 4 January. Following repairs, the airport reopened to JSDF aircraft on 11 January, while All Nippon Airways resumed commercial services to and from the airport on 27 January, albeit in a limited capacity until the end of February. The Noto Railway resumed full operations on 6 April.

=== Humanitarian aid ===
Due to blocked roads, humanitarian aid was sent to the peninsula using ships, while other isolated areas were accessed through helicopters. In light of the difficulties in providing aid, Ishikawa Prefecture asked individuals to refrain from sending aid, instead limiting the call to corporations only. By 4 January, authorities had delivered about 240,000 meals, 500 packages of powdered milk, and 190,000 bottles of drinking water to the affected areas.

On the evening of 2 January, a runway collision occurred at Haneda Airport in Tokyo between a Japan Coast Guard DHC-8 aircraft carrying humanitarian aid to earthquake victims in Niigata and Japan Airlines Flight 516, an A350-900 from New Chitose Airport landing at Haneda, destroying both aircraft. All 379 people aboard the JAL plane were evacuated; however, 15 sustained injuries. The captain of the Coast Guard plane escaped with critical injuries, while the remaining five crew members were killed.

Fundraising campaigns across the country collected a total amount of ¥10 billion ($67 million) for relief aid. Private organizations raised at least $8 million in crowdfunding drives for relief aid, while the Ishikawa prefectural government began accepting cash donations at its offices, including those in Tokyo and Osaka, while announcing plans to open a bank account for further donations. By 24 January, the prefectural government said that it had received a total of at least ¥11 billion ($74.4 million) in donations, which was augmented by donations amounting to $8.1 million for the local Japanese Red Cross Society (JRCS) and $2.4 million to the local Central Community Chest of Japan (CCCJ) branch. The CCCJ also established the Disaster Relief Volunteer & NPO Support Fund (VolSup) to support NPOs and their activities in providing help to victims.

Apparel companies, including Gunze, Fast Retailing and Onward Holdings, donated at least 170,000 items for victims of the earthquake. About 110 hotels and inns volunteered to take in 3,000 people displaced by the earthquake. JR Freight announced that it would carry humanitarian aid to the affected areas for free. Nintendo announced that it will donate ¥50 million via the JRCS for disaster relief, with The Pokémon Company also having donated the same amount earlier in the month. KDDI offered 550 Starlink routers to shelters, government offices and medical teams operating in areas affected by the earthquake. In February 2024, the Japan Sumo Association donated ¥10 million to Ishikawa Prefecture, plus ¥5 million collected from spectators at the January tournament in Tokyo. Two months later, in April 2024, the association also organized its first kanjin-sumō (勧進相撲, charity sumo) tournament in 62 years with an additional ¥27 million raised during the event.

The JRCS dispatched staff members and Emergency Medical Relief Teams to Ishikawa prefecture, focusing on hospitals, social welfare facilities, and evacuation centers. It also deployed Disaster Medical Coordination teams, nurses, and provided psychosocial support to affected people. The JRCS also installed a temporary water distribution system at evacuation centers in Nanao, which began supplying water on 22 January by purifying water from a swimming pool.

The Taiwanese government announced ¥60 million in aid to support rescue operations and relief. A donation account was also created, while a fundraising campaign collected over NT$540 million ($17.2 million) from the private sector. United States Ambassador Rahm Emanuel pledged an initial $100,000 in humanitarian aid to Japan and logistical support from the United States military. Japan said it only had plans to accept aid from the United States despite offers from other countries including Taiwan and China. In a statement from Chief Cabinet Secretary Yoshimasa Hayashi, the country was "not accepting any personnel or material aid at the moment given the situation on the ground and the efforts that would be required to receive them." South Korea also said that it would provide $3 million in humanitarian aid. The Thai embassy in Tokyo sent 2,500 kilograms of food and other relief items to Ishikawa Prefecture.

Los Angeles Dodgers baseball player Shohei Ohtani donated an undisclosed amount of aid to victims in the Noto peninsula. The Dodgers subsequently announced that it would donate an additional $1 million towards earthquake relief.

The Peace Boat Disaster Relief Volunteer Centre (PBV) and Peace Wing launched initiatives to support the affected regions, with PBV providing food and material supplies, first-aid, and support for shelter operations and disaster relief volunteer centers, while Peace Wing dispatched an emergency support team, including doctors, nurses, rescue workers, and a disaster relief dog team, to provide search and rescue support, medical support, and emergency supplies.

From 3 May to 2 June 2024, a special event was held in Nanao by manga author Makoto Ojiro, aiming to support the city. With the help of the manga publisher Shogakukan, the proceeds from the sales of her manga, Insomniacs After School—which is set in Nanao—will be donated to the city's relief fund for one year, from 16 April 2024 to 15 April 2025.

On January 4, 2024, the Yomiuri Light and Love Foundation donated ¥10 million to Ishikawa Prefecture from its Large-Scale Disaster Relief Fund, which was funded by proceeds from the sale of original merchandise for the "Yuzuru Hanyu Exhibition 2022," organized by the Yomiuri Shimbun. In March 2024, it was also announced that a portion of the merchandise sales from the 2024 "Yuzuru Hanyu Notte Stellata" ice show would be donated to support the earthquake victims through the Japanese Red Cross Society. On June 30, 2024, professional figure skater Yuzuru Hanyu and the Yomiuri Shimbun jointly donated an additional ¥2 million to the Yomiuri Light and Love Foundation to support victims of the Noto Peninsula earthquake. Subsequently, on September 15, 2024, Yuzuru Hanyu led a charity ice show performance titled "Challenge" in Ishikawa Prefecture, accompanied by figure skaters Satoko Miyahara, Akiko Suzuki, and Takahito Mura. The event was streamed live and on-demand via video streaming services, selling more than 10,000 tickets. The ¥53,662,728 ($367,758) proceeds from the event were donated to the Ishikawa Prefecture and Noto local government for the reconstruction of the areas affected by the earthquake.

== Aftermath ==
The aftermath of the earthquake included a major humanitarian impact in the worst affected regions, as well as a national economic impact. Preliminary findings by Japanese financial services company Nomura Securities suggested the temporary stagnation of economic activity would push down nominal GDP by 23 to 50 billion yen. Nomura estimated that the most affected cities, such as Suzu, Wajima and Nanao, will experience a temporary pause in economic activity. NHK added that losses are likely to increase, as the damage to roads, housing and factories has not been considered in the research. However, it is estimated that the wider impact on supply chains may be less than those compared to the 2016 Kumamoto earthquakes. Tourism in the affected areas suffered negatively, with 10,000 people cancelling their bookings in Toyama Prefecture alone, leading to losses of about 140 million yen ($970,000).

As of 5 January, approximately 24,000 buildings remained without electricity in Ishikawa prefecture, and the Minister of Economy, Trade and Industry, Ken Saitō, told reporters of the difficulty of estimating a clear timeframe for the recovery of power. Two whale sharks at the Notojima Aquarium died nine days after the earthquake. Park officials said damaged equipment may have deteriorated living conditions inside the tank and contributed to their deaths. In total, around 5,000 creatures died in the aquarium following damage from the earthquake to its water circulation equipment and pipes.

At least 32 criminal incidents relating to the earthquake were reported following the disaster, including burglaries of damaged or evacuated homes and thefts at evacuation centers. The police pledged to install about 1,000 security cameras in the affected areas in response to these incidents.

The perceived slow response drew widespread criticism from the public. Anger was directed at Kishida for his delayed deployment of the JSDF. He was also criticized for only visiting an evacuation center briefly two weeks after the earthquake. In Wajima, there were over 4,000 registrations for temporary housing units with baths and water heating, of which, only 550 were constructed by mid-February. Only 40 of the 456 temporary housing units in Suzu were completed. Local officials said about 14,000 temporary housing units would be ready by the end of March. Despite reassurance by the government, local residents' confidence remains low due to living conditions in evacuation centers and the delayed response. By the end of February, more than 11,000 people remained in temporary shelters.

The earthquake also led to a weakening of the Japanese yen, in contrast to its temporary appreciation against the dollar following previous earthquakes.

Some of the vendors affected by the destruction of the Asaichi morning market in Wajima temporarily relocated to Kanazawa in March. The market itself reopened on 6 April.

The effects of the earthquake have led to an exodus of young people from the affected region, hampering reconstruction efforts. More than 100 businesses in Ishikawa Prefecture have closed since the earthquake, and many business owners cited population outflows and slow progress in reconstruction efforts for their decisions to close.

In February 2025, researchers at the University of Tokyo used mobile phone data to estimate that the populations of Wajima and Suzu had declined by 30% since before the earthquake, significantly higher than the 10% decrease reported in official figures. Recovery has been slowed by delays in constructing housing for displaced residents. Wajima is estimated to need between 1,000 and 1,400 units, and Suzu around 700, with full occupancy not expected until 2026.

== Reactions ==
=== Domestic ===
Emperor Naruhito and Empress Masako's annual New Year appearance and greetings to the public on 2 January was cancelled due to the earthquake. The Imperial Household Agency said it was the first time that the event was cancelled due to a natural disaster. It also reported that the Imperial couple "wish that rescue operations and fire-fighting efforts in affected areas will progress as quickly as possible amid the severe cold weather." At a function in Tokyo marking his first public appearance for the year on 15 January, the emperor offered his first public condolences for those affected and praised relief workers for their efforts. He also sent a message of sympathy to Ishikawa governor Hiroshi Hase. Ahead of his 64th birthday on 23 February, the emperor reiterated his condolences for the victims and expressed an intent for the Imperial couple to visit the Noto Peninsula once circumstances allow. The Imperial couple finally visited the area on 22 March and on 12 April. Prime Minister Kishida also postponed a ceremonial New Year visit to the Ise Shrine due to the earthquake.

A moment of silence was held for the victims of the earthquake on the first day of trading of 2024 at the Tokyo Stock Exchange.

Toyota delayed the beginning of its domestic vehicle manufacturing operations for 2024, which had been due to begin on 8 January, until further notice, citing earthquake damage to some of its suppliers.

=== International ===
North Korean leader Kim Jong Un sent a telegram to Japanese Prime Minister Fumio Kishida, his condolences and wished the Japanese people a fast recovery. It marked the first time Kim has sent his condolences after a natural disaster, and the first time he has sent a telegram to Kishida. It was also the first time that North Korea had sent official condolences to Japan since 1995. Australian Prime Minister Anthony Albanese sent condolences and said Australia was ready to send any assistance to Japan. Philippine president Bongbong Marcos offered to send assistance to Japan, while the Armed Forces of the Philippines also offered to collaborate with the Japan Self-Defense Forces in its response to the earthquake. International Monetary Fund Managing Director Kristalina Georgieva and Pope Francis also expressed their prayers to the victims of the earthquake. The United States announced preparations for military logistics, food and aid. United States Forces Japan remained "ready to support our Japanese Allies during this difficult time."

In China, a news anchor from Hainan Radio and Television was suspended after stating on his Weibo account that the earthquake was retribution over the Japanese government's decision to discharge radioactive water from the Fukushima Daiichi Nuclear Power Plant into the Pacific Ocean which started in September 2023.

== Misinformation ==
Misinformation about the earthquake spread on social media platforms such as Twitter. Users falsely linked a November 2023 video of an underwater earthquake in Indonesia, photos of the 2011 Tōhoku and 2016 Kumamoto earthquakes and a 2021 landslide following the earthquake. At least one account, claiming to belong to a victim of the earthquake, was found to be using misinformation to seek donations online. False claims were also made of the earthquake being man-made, with a video citing a previous nuclear weapons test by North Korea. Analysis conducted by NHK found that many sources of misinformation regarding false requests for rescue appeared to have originated from overseas-based accounts, especially in Pakistan. Such accounts have been popularly dubbed "impression zombies" (インプレゾンビ, imprezombi) and are a growing phenomenon on the social media platform following Elon Musk's acquisition and alteration to monetization policies for its "premium" users.

Former Japanese Prime Minister Yukio Hatoyama incorrectly claimed the earthquake caused a fire at the Shika Nuclear Power Plant and suggested that impacts of the earthquake had been deliberately downplayed to restart the plant. While there had been a minimal oil spill at two of the reactors, there was no impact on the plant.

== Gallery ==
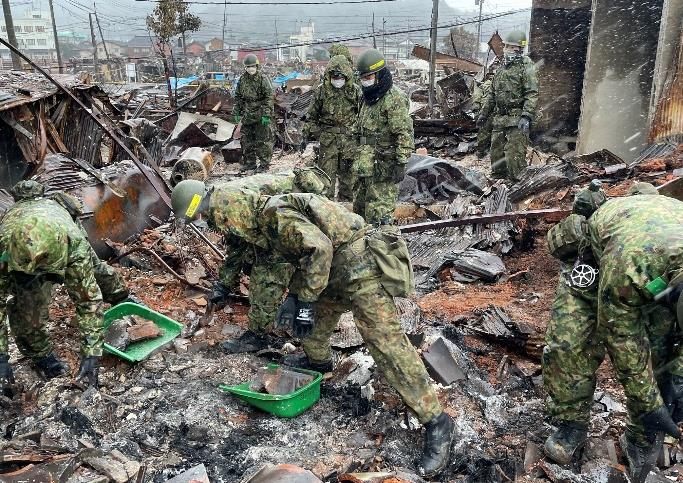
Japan Self-Defense Forces in Wajima

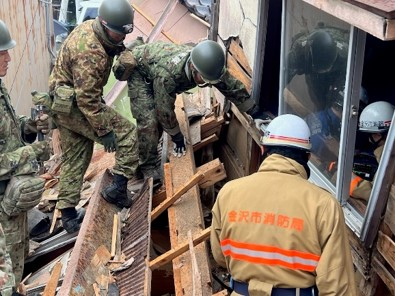
Rescue troops in Kanazawa

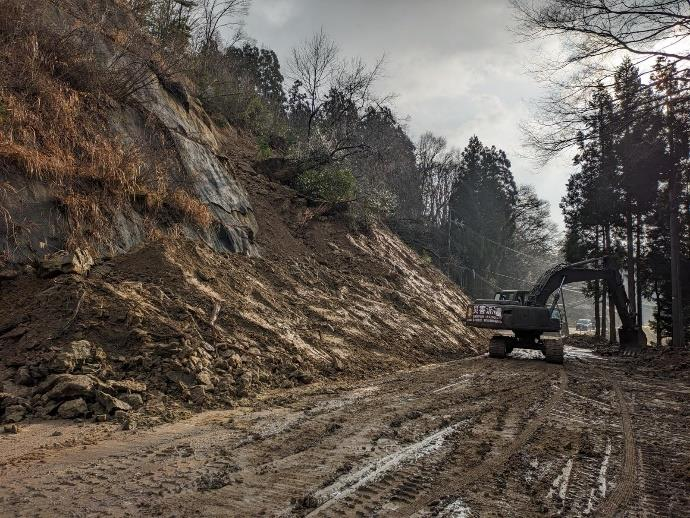
Road clearing

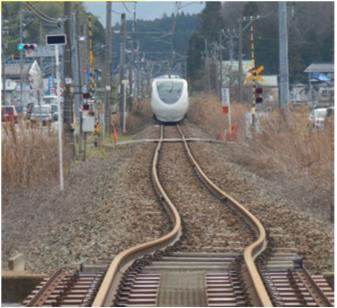
Distorted railway line between Nanao and Wakuraonsen Stations

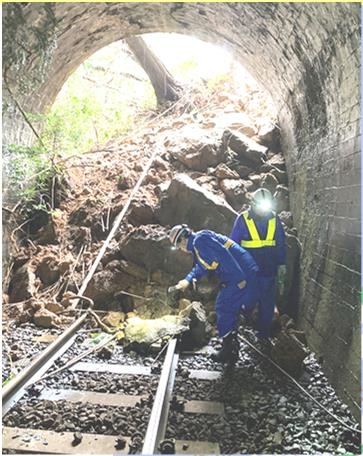
Landslide between Notokashima and Anamizu Stations

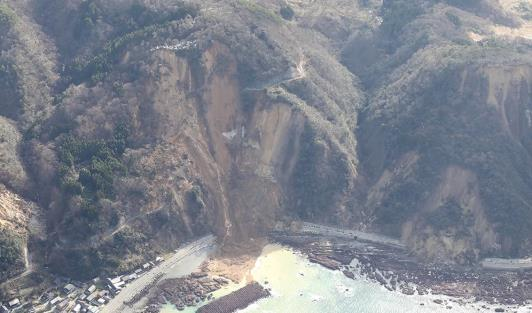
Coastal landslide

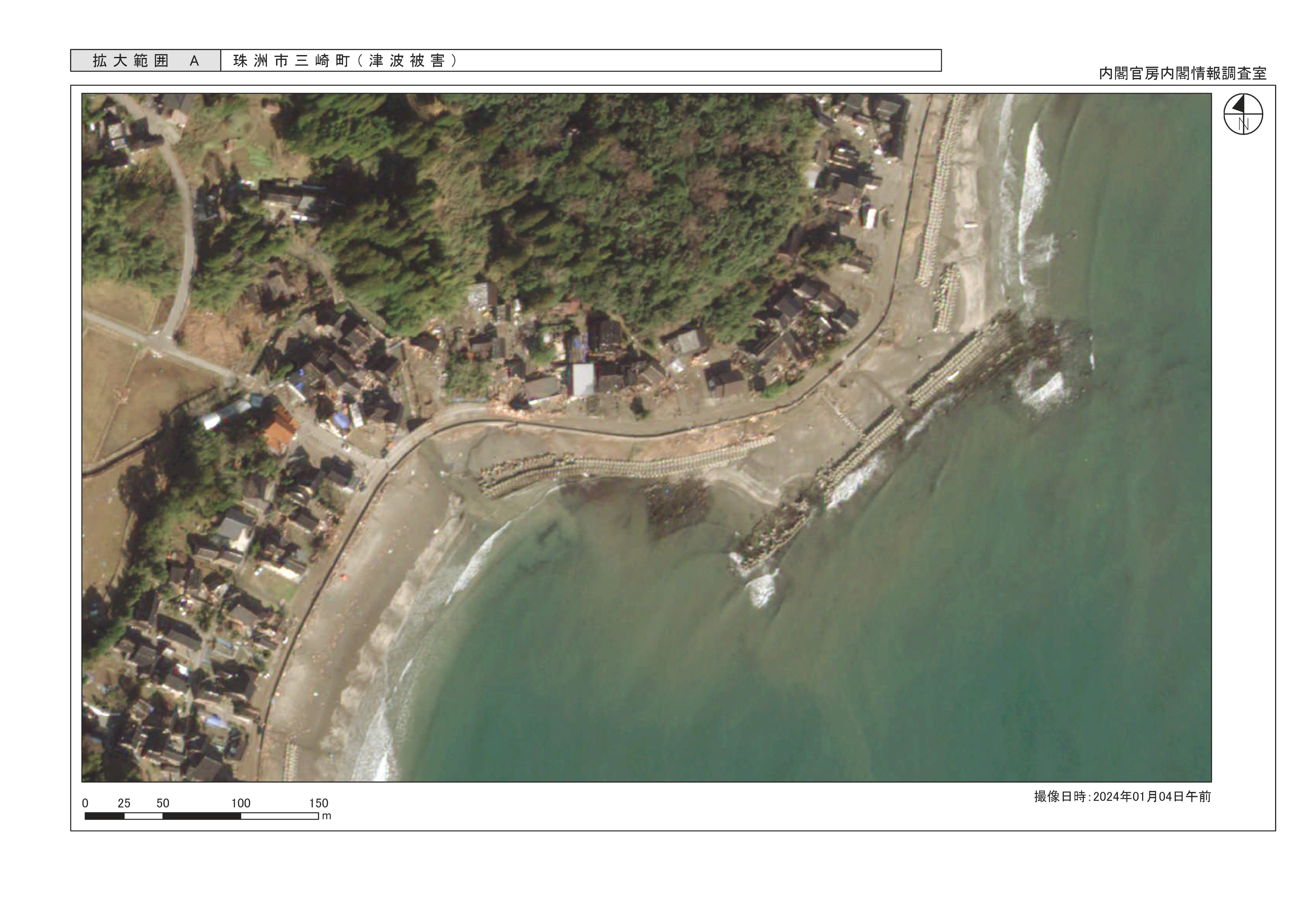
Coastal uplift and tsunami damage in Suzu

Effects of coastal uplift comparison

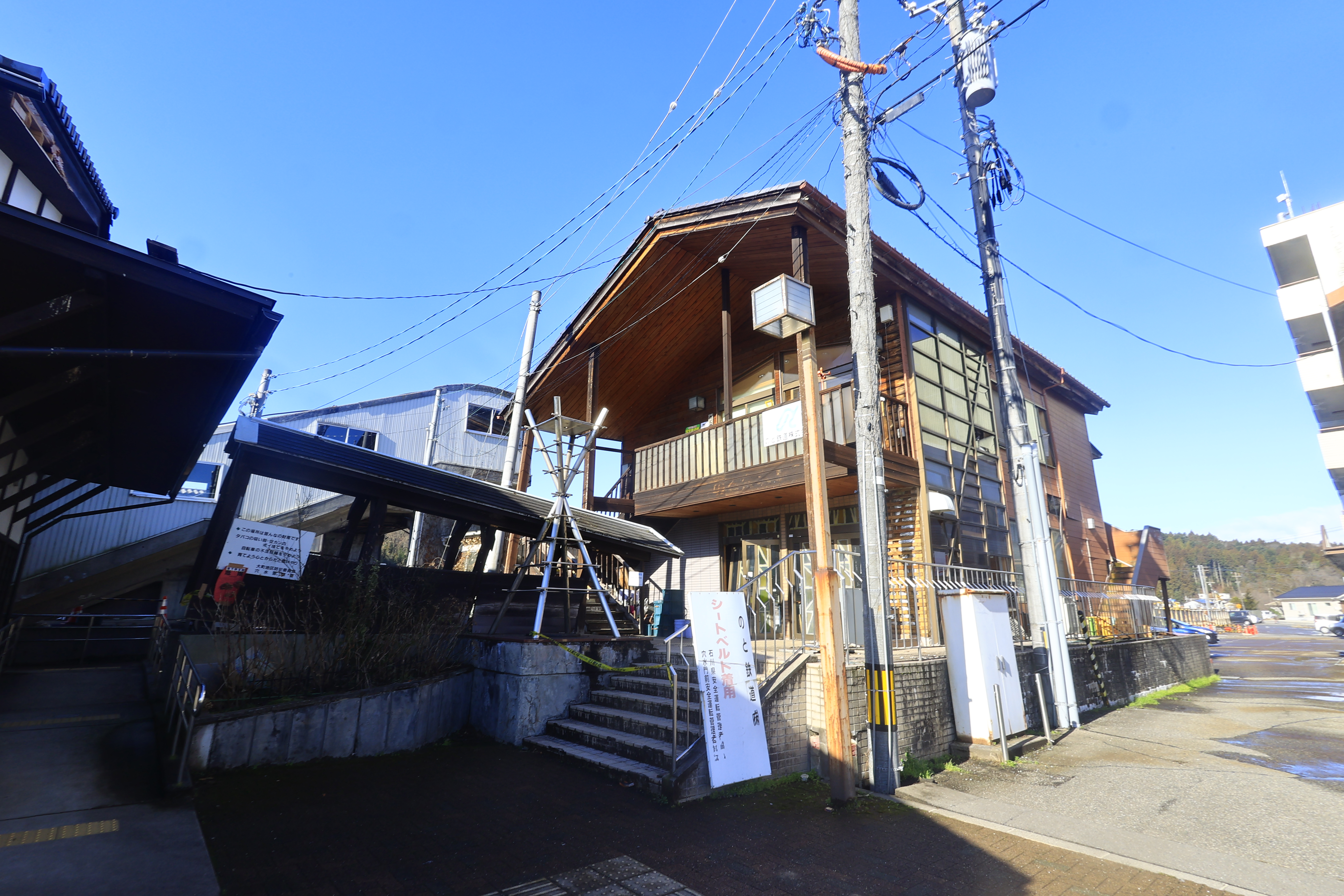
Damage to Anamizu Station

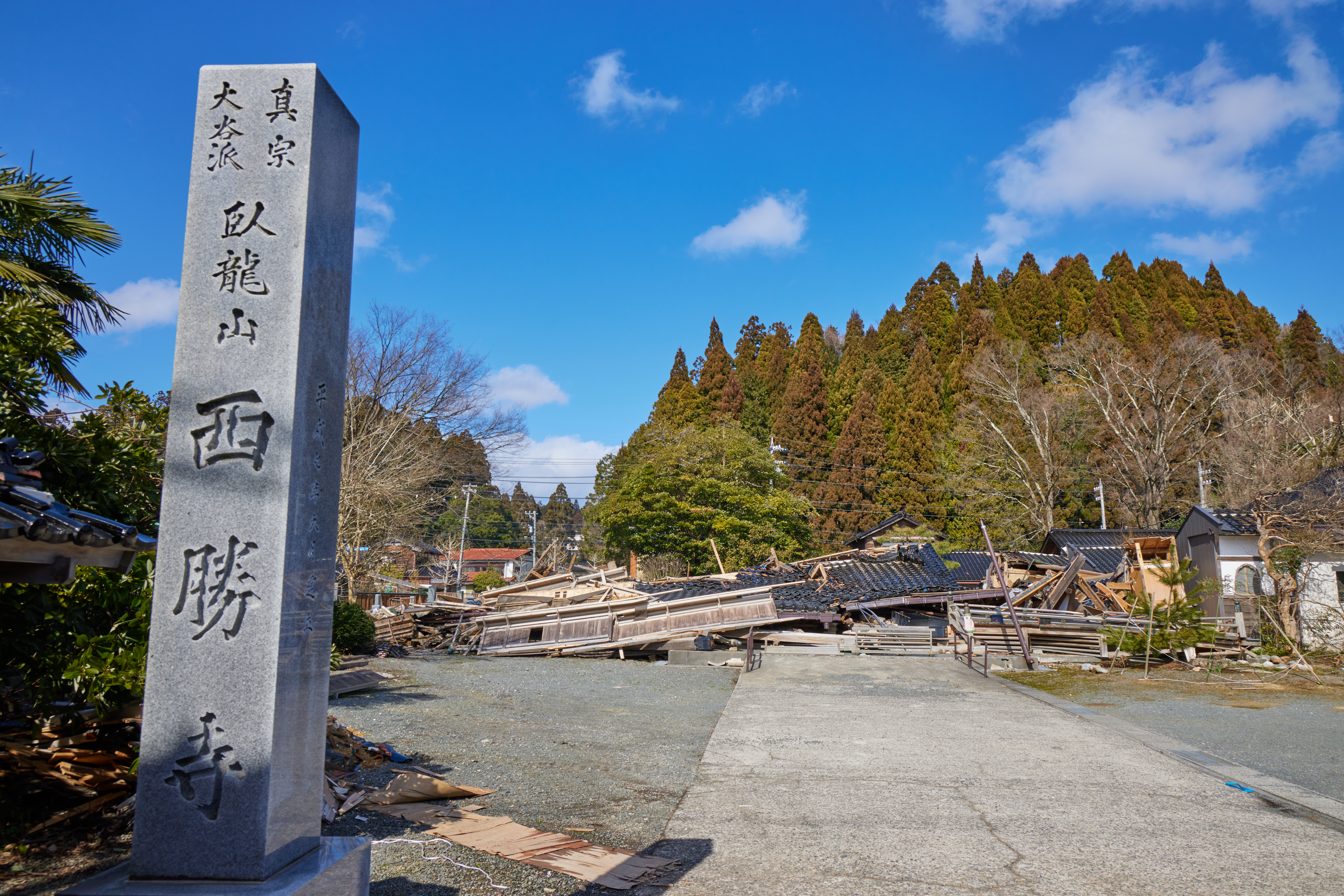
Collapsed temple in Suzu

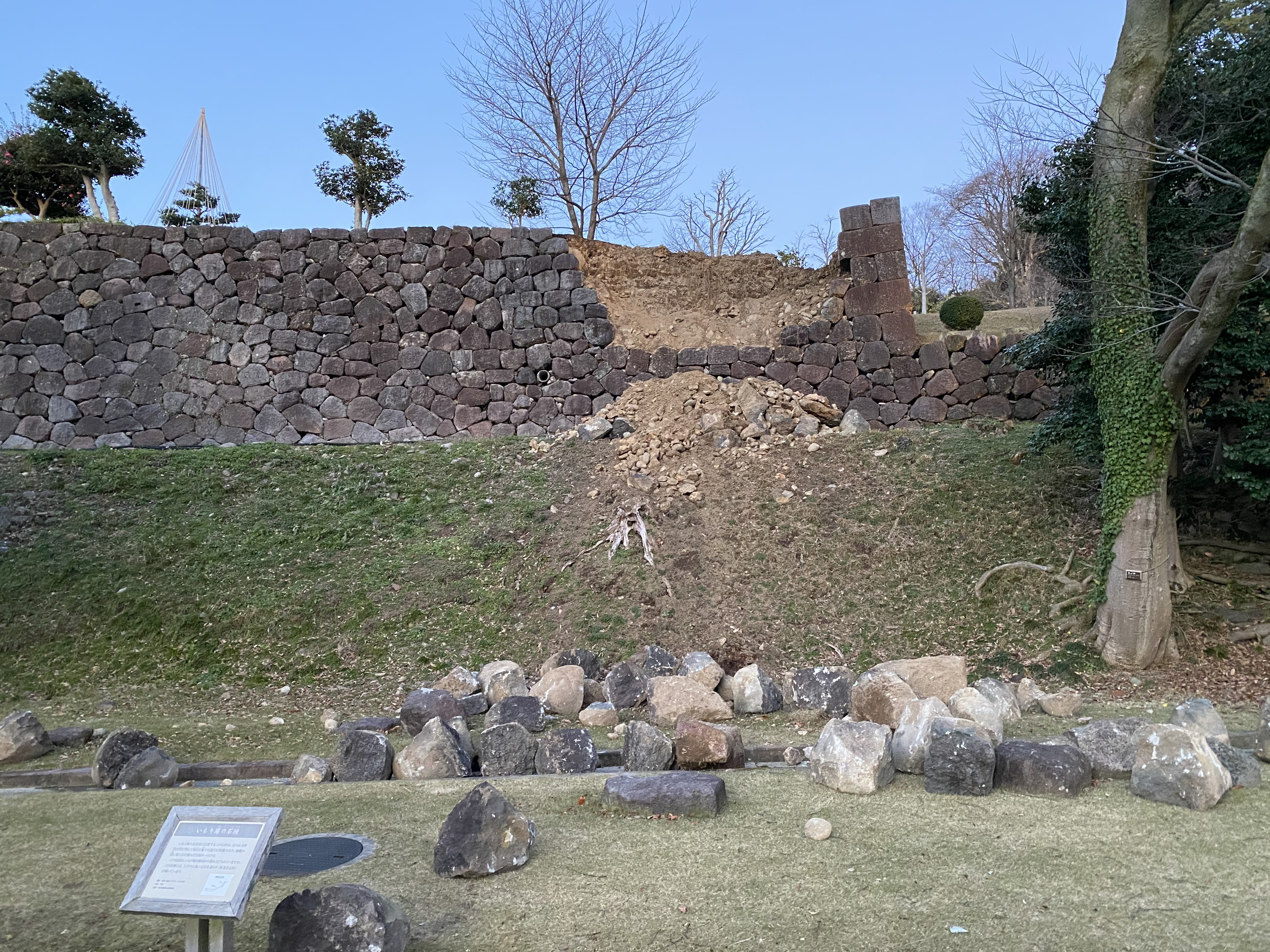
Damaged wall at Kanazawa Castle

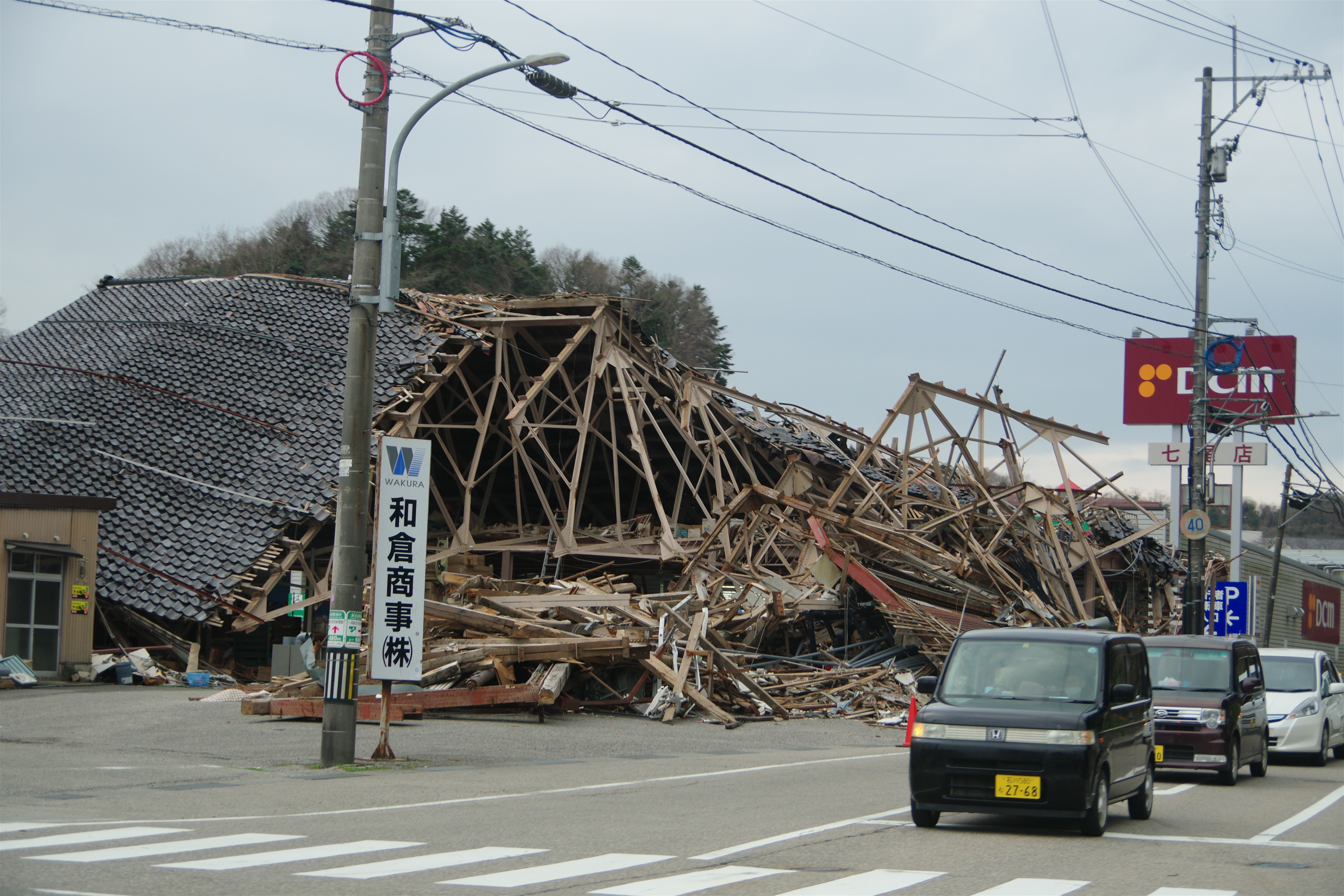
Partially collapsed warehouse in Nanao

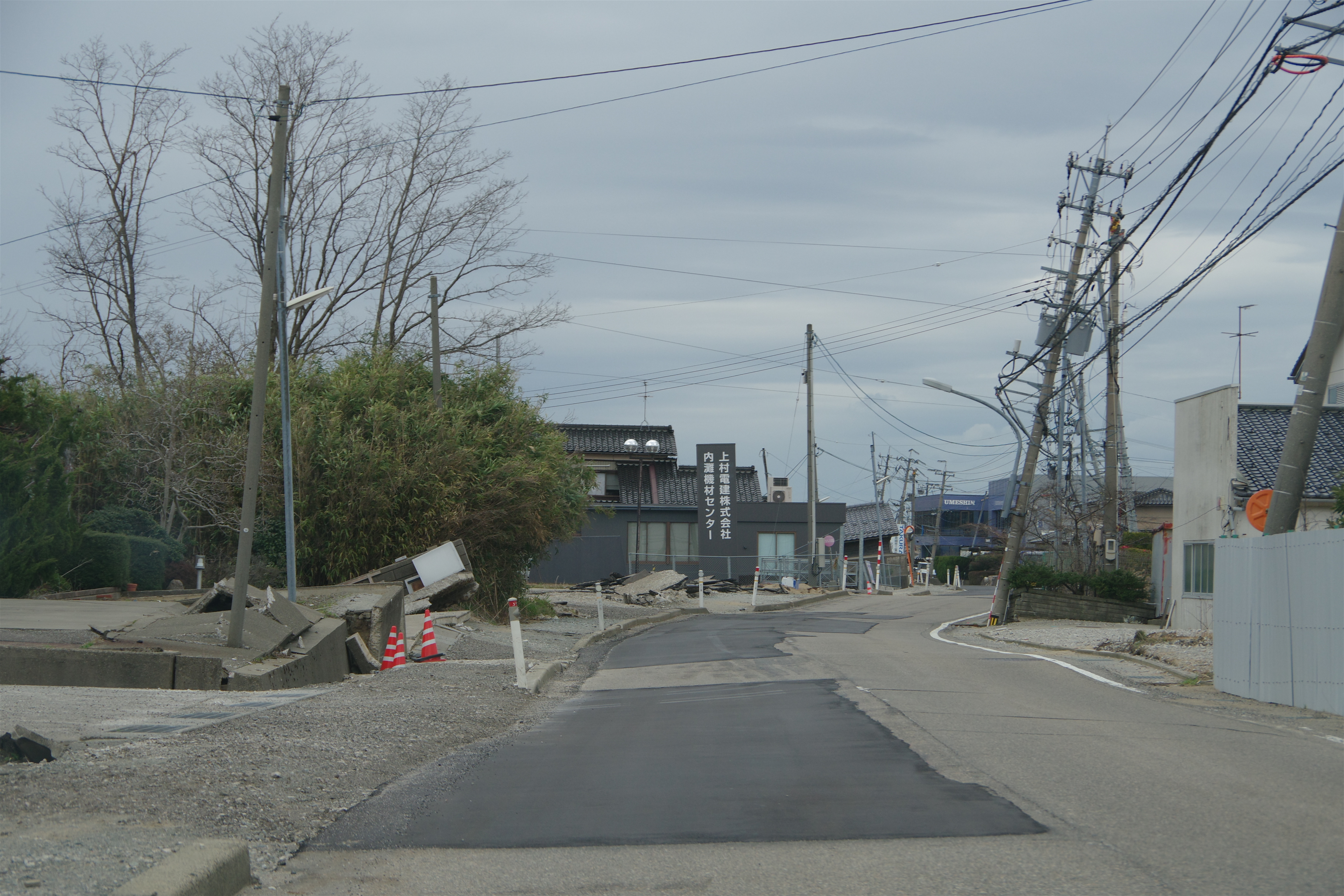
Liquefaction damage in Uchinada

== See also ==
- List of earthquakes in 2024
- List of earthquakes in Japan
- List of tsunamis
- 2007 Noto earthquake
