= Onohiyoshi Shrine =

Shinto shrine in Japan

Onohiyoshi Shrine 大野日吉神社
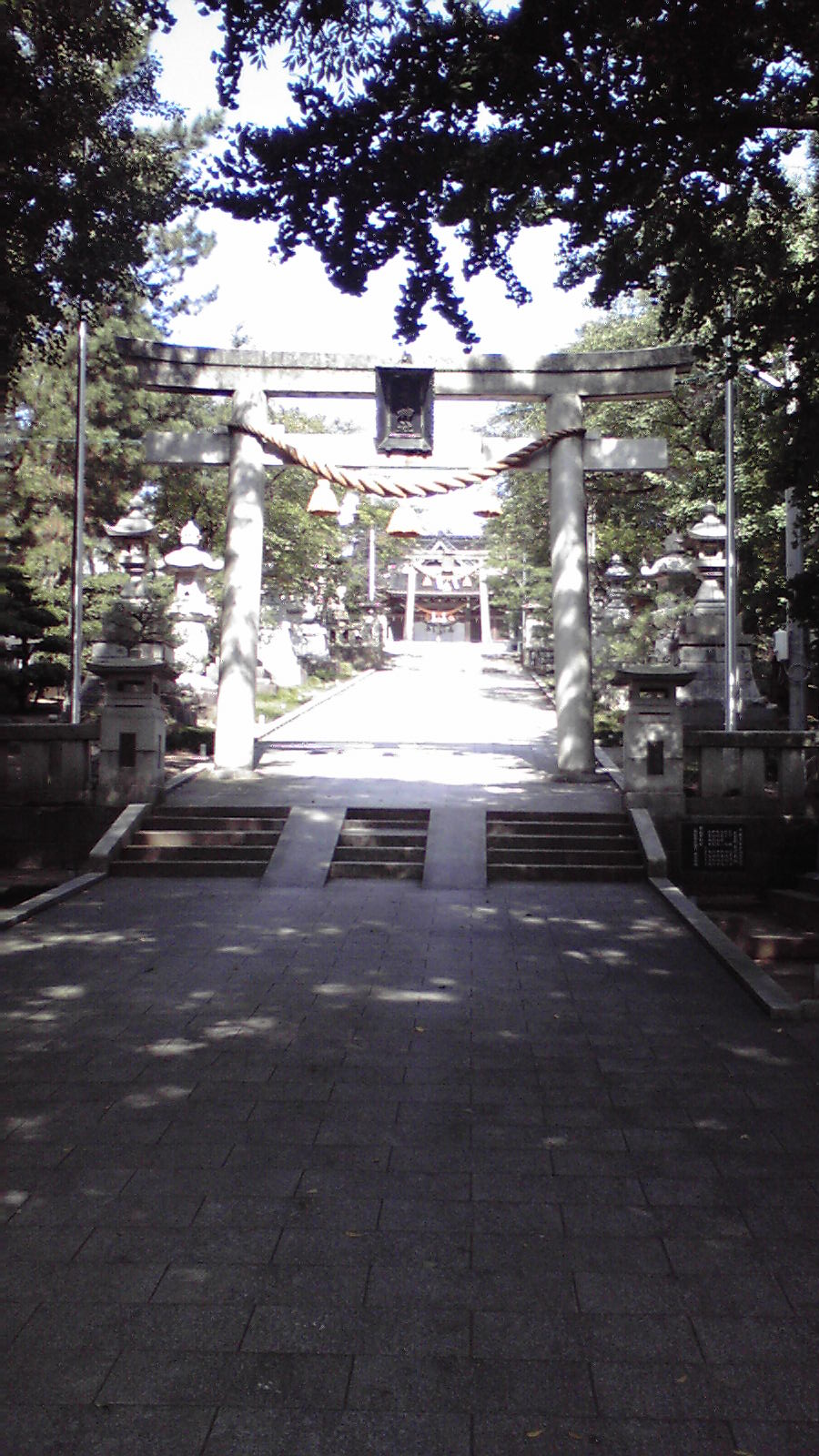

- Location within Japan

Religion
- Affiliation: Shinto
- Deity: Oyamakui no Kami, Ōmononushi
- Type: Village shrine

Location
- Location: Kanazawa, Ishikawa, Japan
- Coordinates: 36°36′46.54″N 136°36′6.13″E

Architecture
- Established: 733

The Onohiyoshi Shrine (大野日吉神社, Ōno hiyoshijinja) is a Shinto shrine located in Kanazawa, Ishikawa. The shrine is dedicated to deities Oyamakui no Kami and Ōmononushi. It is said to have been founded in 733.

The shrine suffered damage during the 2024 Sea of Japan earthquake.
