= Fumihiko Imamura =

- Born: September 24, 1961 (age 64)
- Education: Tohoku University
- Occupation: Scientist

Fumihiko Imamura (今村文彦, Imamura Fumihiko; born September 24, 1961) is a Japanese academic, civil engineer, and Director of the International Research Institute of Disaster Science at Tohoku University in Sendai, Miyagi Prefecture.

After the 2004 Indian Ocean earthquake and tsunami, Imamura was prominent amongst those who proposed that December 26 should be an international day of commemoration. He argued that the simple idea could be effective in preparing people for the giant waves.

== Early life ==
Imamura received his undergraduate degree from Tohoku University in 1984, and was awarded his Ph.D. in civil engineering in 1989.

== Career ==
Imamura is a member of the faculty of Tohoku University. Professor Imamura's fields of interest include tsunami engineering, coastal and river engineering and disaster science. He was among those NHK designated as an expert on disaster response during the 2011 Tōhoku earthquake and tsunami.

His current research encompasses numerical tsunami simulation, warning systems, disaster prevention and evacuation systems. In addition to studying modern and ancient tsunamis through field surveys and analysis of historical documents, the engineering simulation project is used to develop highly accurate quantitative tsunami warnings and assess characteristics of waterfront structures.

== Selected works ==
In a statistical overview derived from writings by and about Fumihiko Imamura, OCLC/WorldCat encompasses roughly 6 works in 10+ publications in 2 languages and 80+ library holdings.

- Tsunamis: 1992-1994; their generation, dynamics, and hazard (1995)
- Sumatra tsunami on 26th December 2004: proceedings of the special Asia tsunami session at APAC 2005, September 4–8, 2005, Seogwipo KAL Hotel, Jeju-do, Korea (2005)

=== Journals ===
- Yanagisawa, Ken; Fumihiko Imamura; Tsutomu Sakakiyama; Tadashi Annaka; Tomoyoshi Takeda; Nobuo Shuto. "Tsunami Assessment for Risk Management at Nuclear Power Facilities in Japan," Pure and Applied Geophysics, 164, no. 2-3 (2007): 565-576.
