= List of mergers in Ishikawa Prefecture =

This is a list of mergers in Ishikawa Prefecture, Japan since the Heisei era.

== Mergers from April 1, 1999 to Present ==
- On March 1, 2004 - the towns of Nanatsuka, Takamatsu and Unoke (all from Kahoku District) were merged to create the city of Kahoku.
- On October 1, 2004 - the old city of Nanao absorbed the towns of Nakajima, Notojima and Tatsuruhama (all from Kashima District) to create the new and expanded city of Nanao.
- On February 1, 2005 - the old city of Mattō was merged with the towns of Mikawa and Tsurugi, and the villages Kawachi, Oguchi, Shiramine, Torigoe and Yoshinodani (all from Ishikawa District) to create the city of Hakusan.
- On February 1, 2005 - the towns of Neagari, Tatsunokuchi and Terai (all from Nomi District) were merged to create the city of Nomi.
- On March 1, 2005 - the town of Noto, and village of Yanagida (both from Fugeshi District) was merged with the town of Uchiura (from Suzu District) to create the new expanded town of Noto. Fugeshi District and Suzu District were both dissolved as a result when merged into Hōsu District. Also, all villages in Ishikawa Prefecture have been dissolved.
- On March 1, 2005 - the towns of Oshimizu and Shio (both from Hakui District) were merged to create the town of Hōdatsushimizu.
- On March 1, 2005 - the towns of Kashima, Rokusei and Toriya (all from Kashima District) were merged to create the town of Nakanoto.
- On September 1, 2005 - the town of Togi (from Hakui District) was merged into the expanded town of Shika.
- On October 1, 2005 - the old city of Kaga absorbed the town of Yamanaka (from Enuma District) and to create the new and expanded city of Kaga. Enuma District was dissolved as a result of this merger.
- On February 1, 2006 - the old city of Wajima absorbed the town of Monzen (from the newly created Hōsu District) to create the new and expanded city of Wajima.
- On November 11, 2011 - the town of Nonoichi (from Ishikawa District) was elevated to city status. Ishikawa District was dissolved as a result of this merger.
