= Torigoe Castle =

- 鳥越城
- Hakusan, Ishikawa Prefecture, Japan
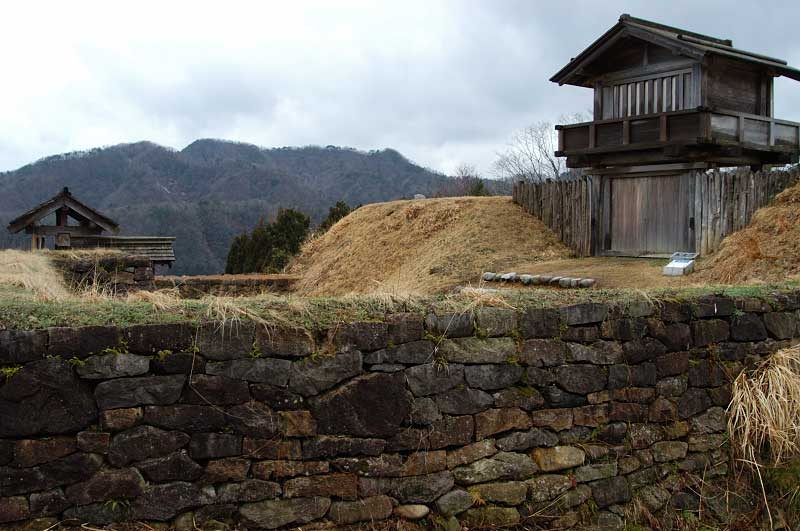
- Restored buildings of Torigoe Castle

Site information
- Type: yamashiro-style Japanese castle
- Open to the public: yes
- Condition: ruins

Location
- Coordinates: 36°21′58″N 136°36′04″E

Site history
- Built: c.1580
- In use: Sengoku period
- Demolished: unknown

Torigoe Castle (鳥越城, Torigoe-jō) was a Sengoku period yamashiro-style Japanese castle located in the Torigoe area of what is now part of the city of Hakusan, Ishikawa Prefecture in the Hokuriku region of Honshu, Japan. Its ruins have been protected as a National Historic Site since 1985. The National Historic Site consists of the ruins of two castles, Torigoe Castle and Futoge Castle. The two castles were built on two mountaintops with the Dainichi River between them in 1573 as the final bastions for the Kaga Ikkō-Ikki movement.

== Background ==
Following the Onin War (1467 - 1477), the weakened Muromachi shogunate was unable to exert control over the Hokuriku region, much of which came under the control of the Jōdo Shinshū-led Ikkō-ikki movement led by the priest Rennyo, who abolished the local feudal rulers and social structure to create a semi-theocratic "peasant's republic". Kaga Province fell to the movement in 1488. However, the movement was strongly opposed by Oda Nobunaga, who invaded Kaga after successfully seizing neighbouring Echizen Province in 1573. The Ikkō-ikki leadership at Hongan-ji responded by sending a commander named Suzuki Dewa-no-kami (about whom little is known) to organise the resistance to Nobunaga in around 1580. He chose a remote valley whose entrance was protected by Funaoka Castle as his stronghold. This valley already had a small castle called Futoge Castle (二曲城); however, Suzuki chose to build a second, and larger castle immediately across the Dainichi River, and named it Torigoe Castle.

== Structure ==
Torigoe Castle is located on a 312-meter high, long and narrow ridge between the main stream of the Tedori River and its tributary Dainichi River. The inner bailey is located on the highest part of the ridge, and is a rectangular area with dimensions of 50 x 20 meters with a fortified two-story gate and yagura turrets. Parts of the ramparts are reinforced with stone. To the south of the inner bailey is a secondary kuruwa enclosure. There is also a third kuruwa behind the main bailey, and all of these enclosures were protected by dry moats. The total size of the castle was approximately 300 x 50 meters.

Neighbouring Futoge Castle was much smaller, but was likewise built on a ridge with several small enclosures.

== History ==
Oda forces captured Ōyama-gōbō, the headquarters of the Kaga Ikkō-ikki in 1580, and the Oda army led by Sakuma Morimasa moved swiftly to crush remaining resistance at Torigoe Castle. However, Suzuki used his force of matchlock gunners with great effect, and the Oda army was unable to take Torigoe on its first attempt. Meanwhile, word reached the defenders that the head of the Jōdo Shinshū movement had reached an accommodation with Nobunaga at Ishiyama Hongan-ji. This meant that they were now isolated, and thus when the Oda general Shibata Katsuie invited a parley, Suzuki Dewa-No-Mami accepted his offer and went to his castle for negotiations. The parley was a ruse, and Suzuki and his generals were murdered. Now leaderless, Torigoe Castle quickly fell to the Oda. The following year, Shibata moved his army to Kanazawa, and the local Ikkō-ikki partisans of the Hakusan area seized the opportunity to retake Torigoe and Futoge Castles, killing the Shibata-appointed commanders. Shibata responded by recovering the castles and slaughtering all 300 of the defenders.

Torigoe Castle was abandoned some time after the 1583 Battle of Shizugatake. Kaga Province came under the rule of the Maeda clan. Maeda Toshiie was still wary of a revival of the Kaga Ikkō-ikki movement and refortified nearby Funaoka Castle; however, Torigoe and Futoge castles were abolished and the sites were lost. Archaeological excavations have revealed the outlines of the fortifications and foundations of the structures, some of which have been restored as a tourist attraction. The castle was listed as one of the Continued Top 100 Japanese Castles in 2017.

== Gallery ==
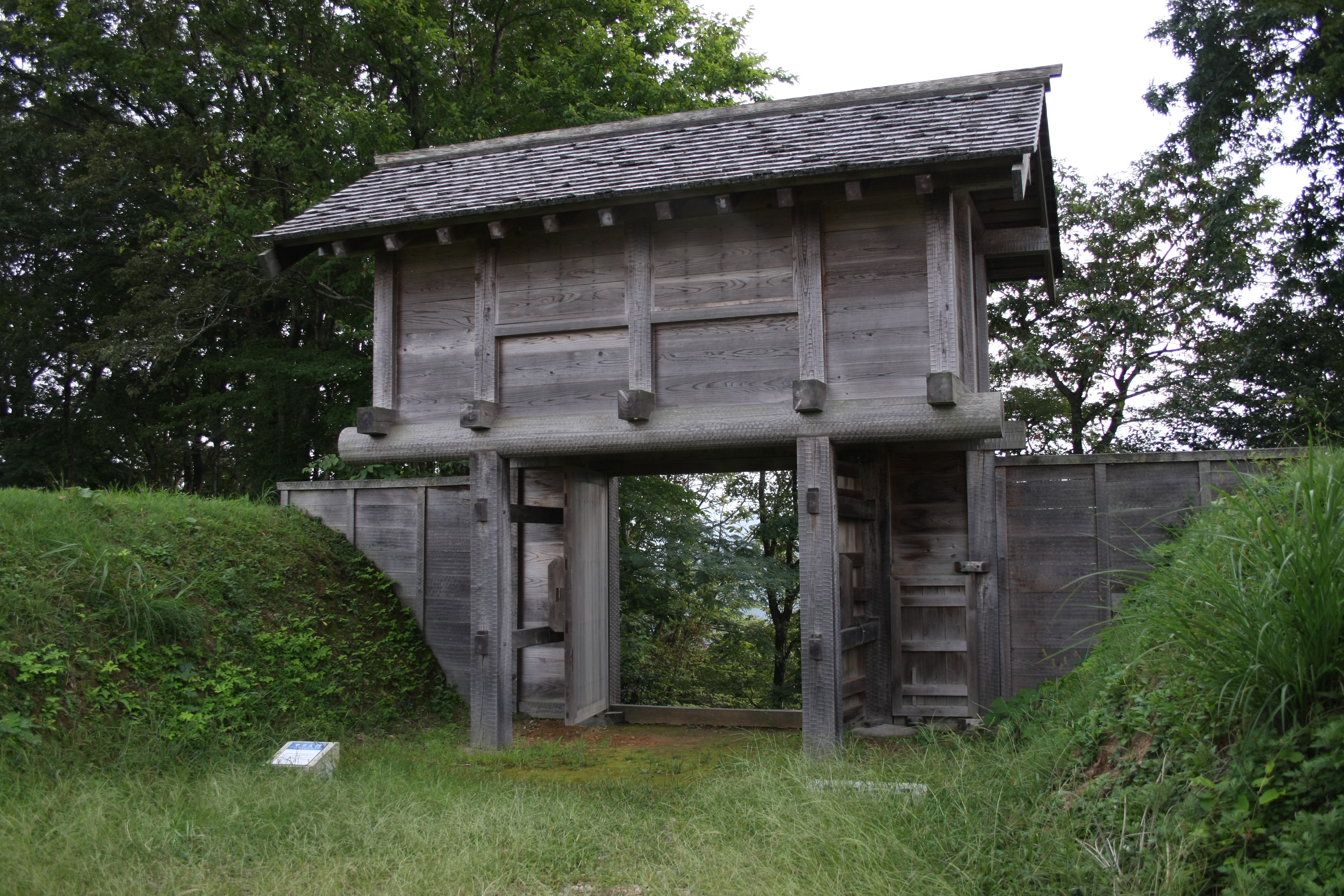
Naka-no-maru Gate

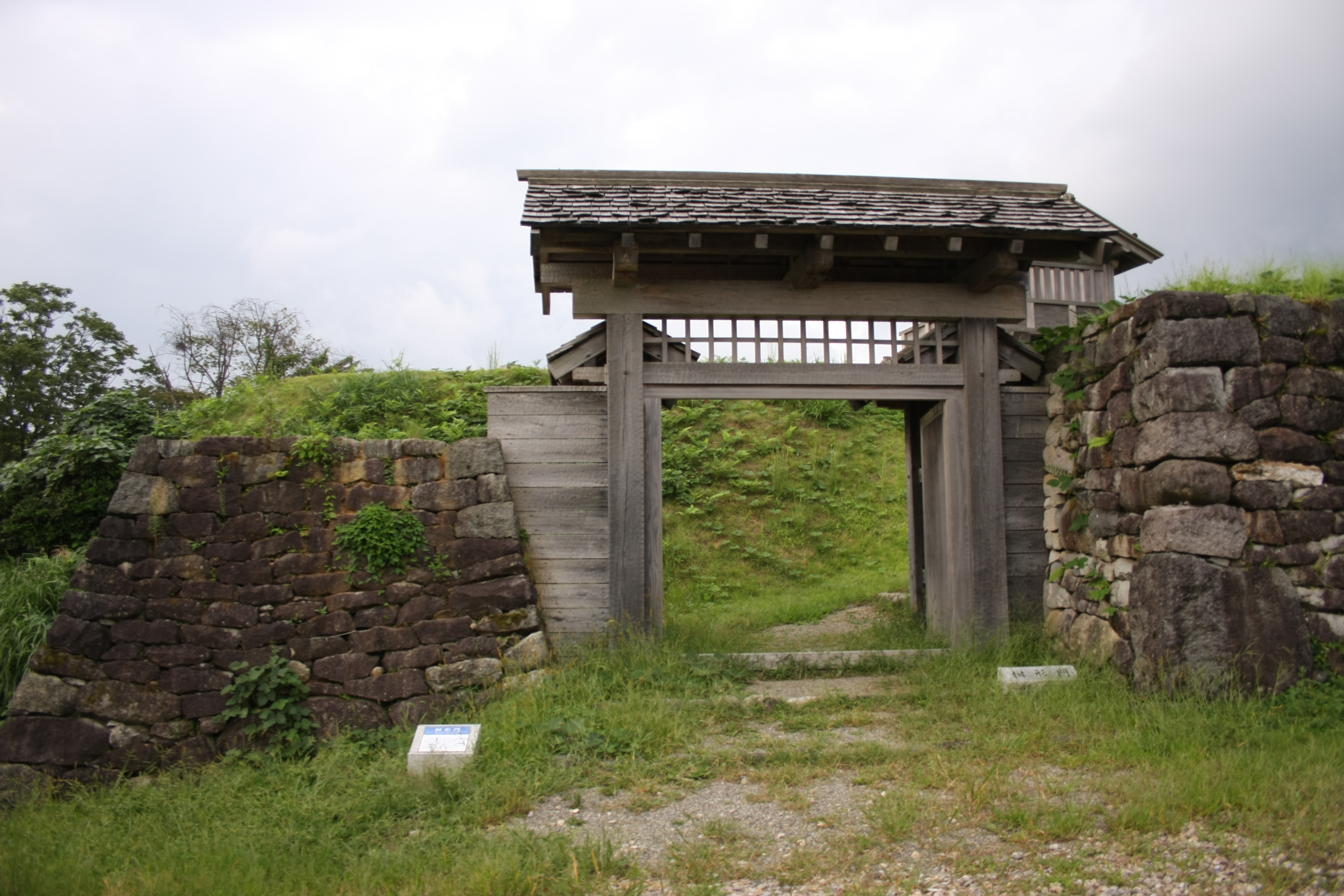
Masugata Gate

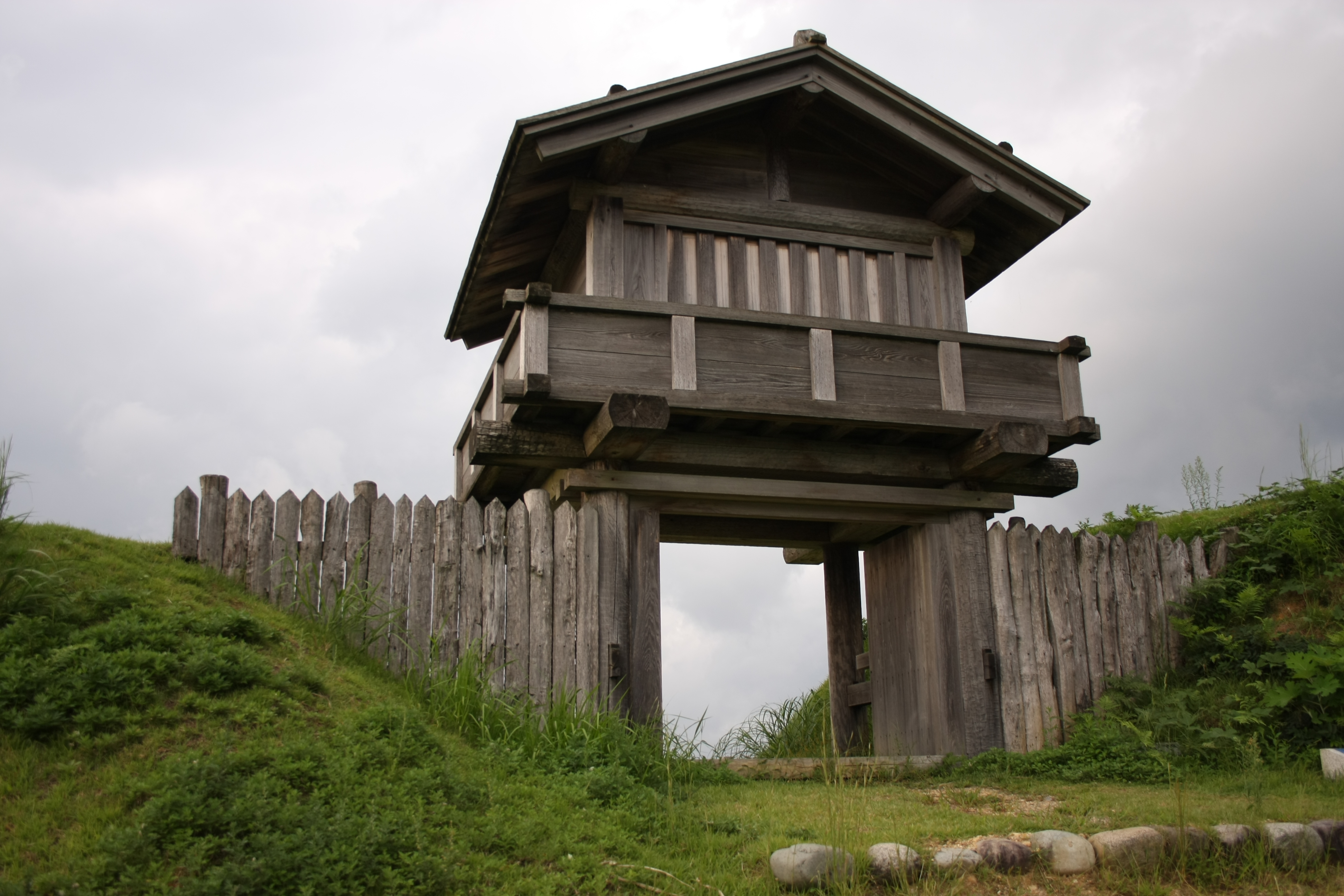
Honmaru Gate

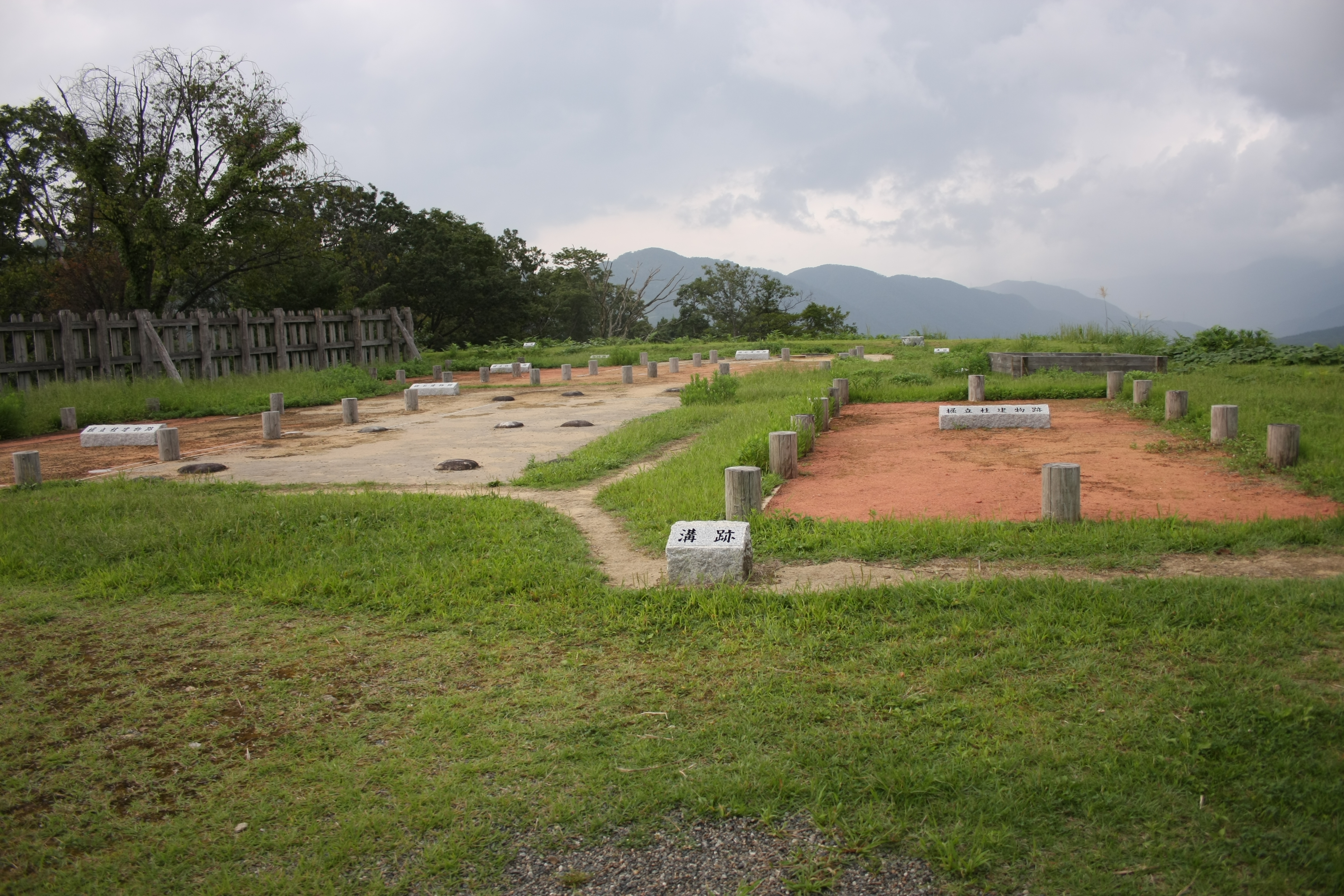
Honmaru

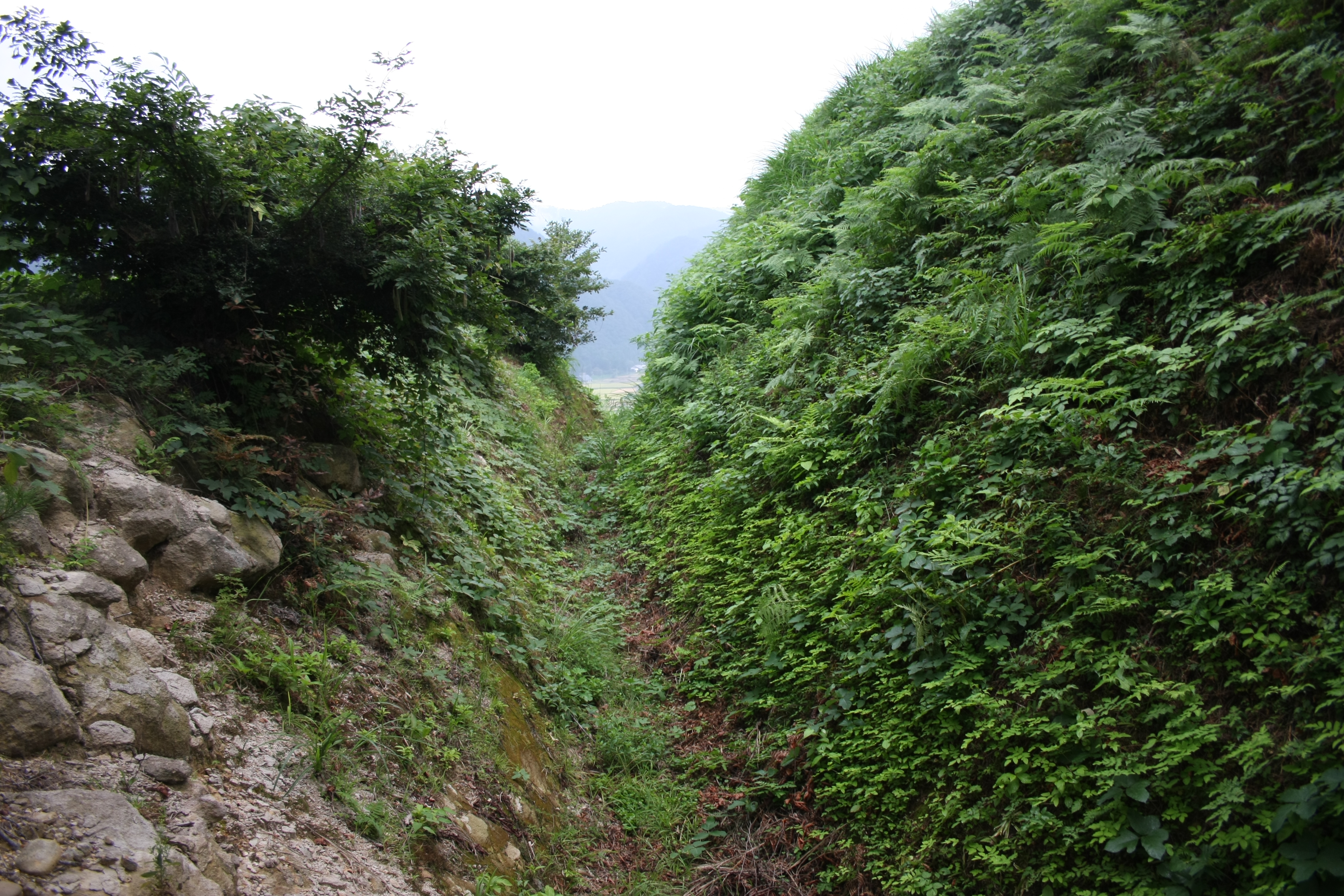
Moat

== See also ==
- List of Historic Sites of Japan (Ishikawa)
