= Ishikawa District =

Ishikawa District can refer to two districts in Japan:

- Ishikawa District, Ishikawa
- Ishikawa District, Fukushima
