= Notojima =

Island in Nanao Bay, Japan

Notojima Island
Native name: 能登島 Notojima
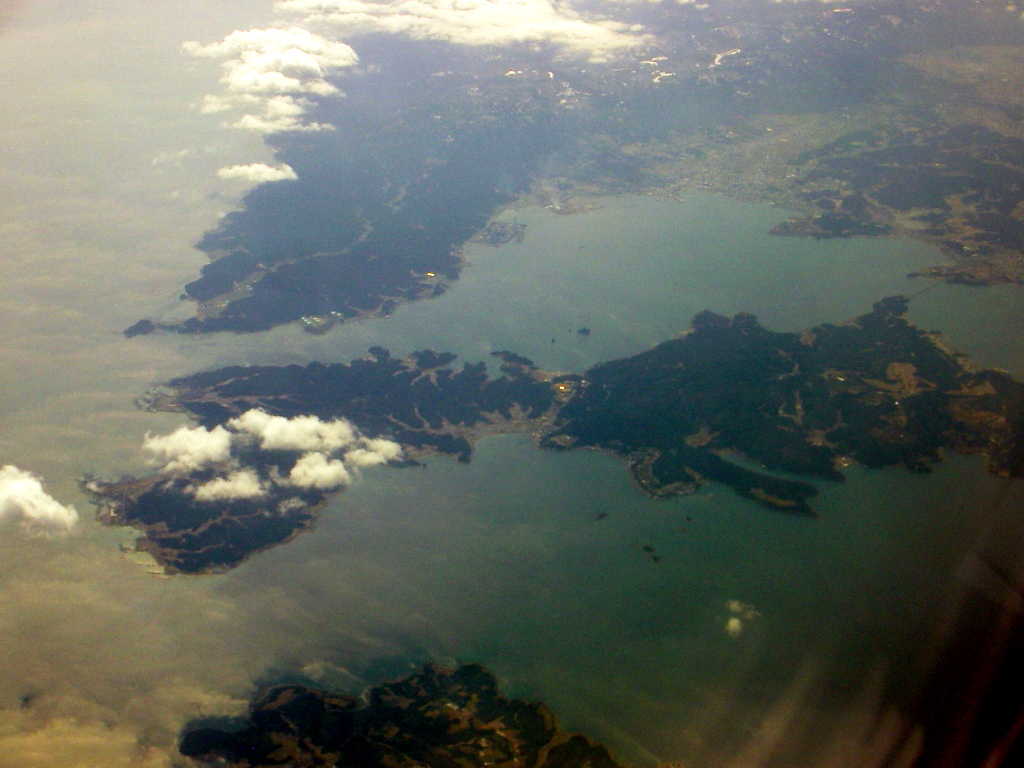

- Location within Japan Location within Ishikawa Prefecture

Geography
- Location: Sea of Japan
- Coordinates: 37°07′30″N 136°59′47″E
- Area: 46.78 km^{2} (18.06 sq mi)
- Length: 11 km (6.8 mi)
- Width: 2 km (1.2 mi)
- Coastline: 71.9 km (44.68 mi)
- Highest elevation: 196.8 m (645.7 ft)
- Highest point: mount Yomurazuka

Administration
- Japan
- Prefecture: Ishikawa Prefecture
- City: Nanao

Demographics
- Population: 3187 (2003)
- Pop. density: 68.13/km^{2} (176.46/sq mi)
- Ethnic groups: Japanese

Notojima (能登島, Noto-jima) is a volcanic island in the Nanao Bay (七尾湾) portion of the Sea of Japan, less than 500 meters off the coast of the Ishikawa prefecture in Japan. Notojima Island is administered as part of Nanao city. The two bridges connecting Notojima to the mainland trisect Nanao Bay into Nanao-North, Nanao-West and Nanao-Nambu bays. The island's highest peak is Mount Yomurazuka at 196.8 m (646 ft). The island has both elementary and middle schools.

== History ==
On February 1, 1955 the three villages of the island are merged into Notojima town. Notojima big bridge (能登島大橋, Notojima ohashi) (southern bridge) was completed in 1982. Twin Bridge Noto (ツインブリッジ能登, Tsuinburijji Noto) (northern bridge) was completed in 1999.

On October 1, 2004 the town of Notojima was abolished and Notojima island became part of the city of Nanao and of Noto-Hanto Quazi-National Park. An earthquake with 6.9 on the Moment magnitude scale occurred March 25, 2007.

== Attractions ==
- At the Notojima Aquarium (のとじま臨海公園水族館) visitors can watch dolphin and seal shows, animal feeding and meet many species in the 'touch and feel' tank. The aquarium also has a collection of jellyfish. In addition, whale sharks also live in the facility newly established in 2010.
- The Notojima Glass Art Museum is the only public specialized glass art museum in Japan. The open space outside the Museum also has 14 glass sculptures.
- Notojima cuisine is famous for its black burgers.

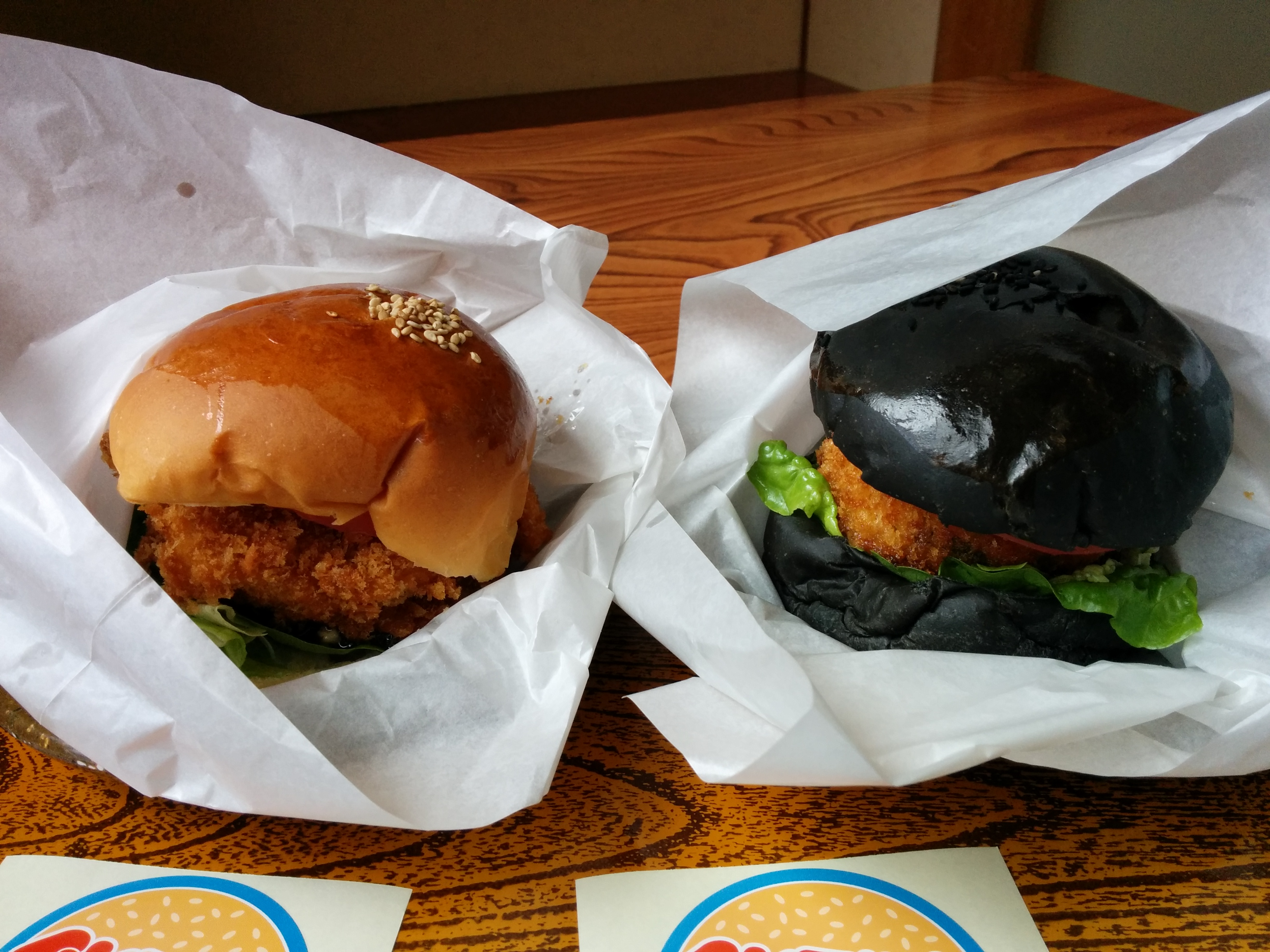

- The waters around Notojima are a common location for recreational sailing.
