= Notojima Aquarium =

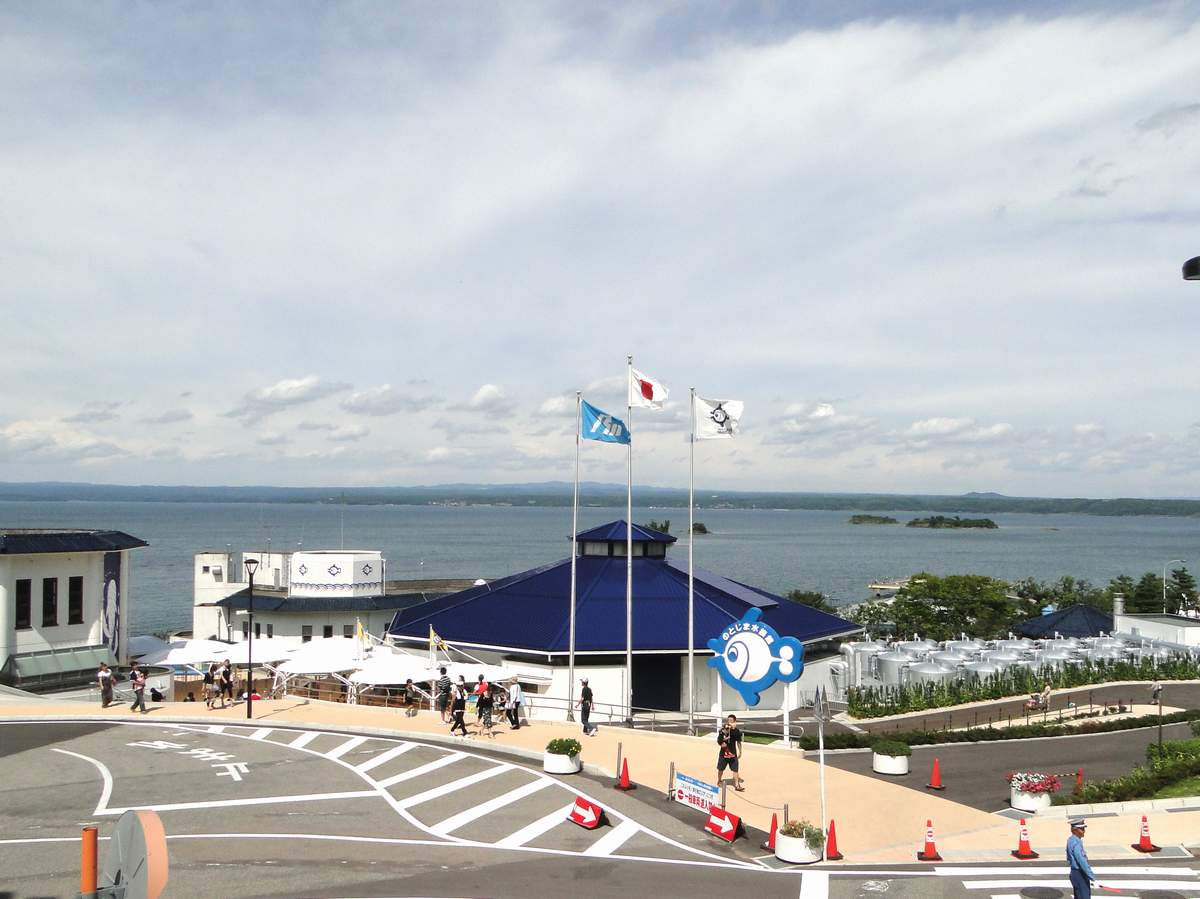
- Interactive map of Notojima Aquarium
- Date opened: 1 July 1982
- Location: Notojima, Nanao, Ishikawa, Japan
- No. of animals: 40,000
- No. of species: 500
- Memberships: JAZA
- Major exhibits: Blue World; Dolphins' Paradise; Noto Sea Galleria
- Website: www.notoaqua.jp

Notojima Aquarium (のとじま臨海公園水族館, Notojima Rinkaikouen Suizokukan) is a public aquarium located on the north coast of Notojima in Nanao, Ishikawa Prefecture. It is a member of the Japanese Association of Zoos and Aquariums (JAZA), and the aquarium is accredited as a Registered Museum by the Ministry of Education, Culture, Sports, Science and Technology.

== Exhibits ==
Whale Sharks in the "Blue World" tank

Notojima Aquarium is the only public aquarium in Ishikawa Prefecture that opened in 1982, and is the largest public aquarium facility on the Sea of Japan side.

The large tank of the "Natural Ecological Museum of the Sea" is one of the largest tanks in Japan for keeping giant kelps (height 7 m (23 ft), width 12 m (39 ft)), and more than 10,000 sardines are in captivity here also. Spotted seals and river otters are also kept at this facility.

Also aquarium have The 22m tunnel fish tank, dubbed "Dolphins' Paradise" for Pacific white-sided dolphins, Humboldt penguins and fish. In 2010, a project to attach an artificial tail fin to a Pacific white-sided dolphin with a missing caudal fin named Lanan is started. following Fuji at the Okinawa Churaumi Aquarium, succeeded in installing the second artificial tail fin of a dolphin in the world with the cooperation of Bridgestone.

In 2010, captivity whale sharks in the panoramic fish tank of the new facility "Blue World" is started and aquariums have captivity to this day. also captivity large pelagic fish such as bluefin tuna. In the winter season after 2013, aquariums installed multiple kotatsu in front of the fish tank of "Blue World" and adopted a system to observe fish while warming the body. Nine days after the 2024 Noto earthquake, a male whale shark at the attraction died which officials attributed to equipment damage leading to poor living conditions in the tank. The next day, a female individual was also found to be dead.

== Gallery ==
Exterior

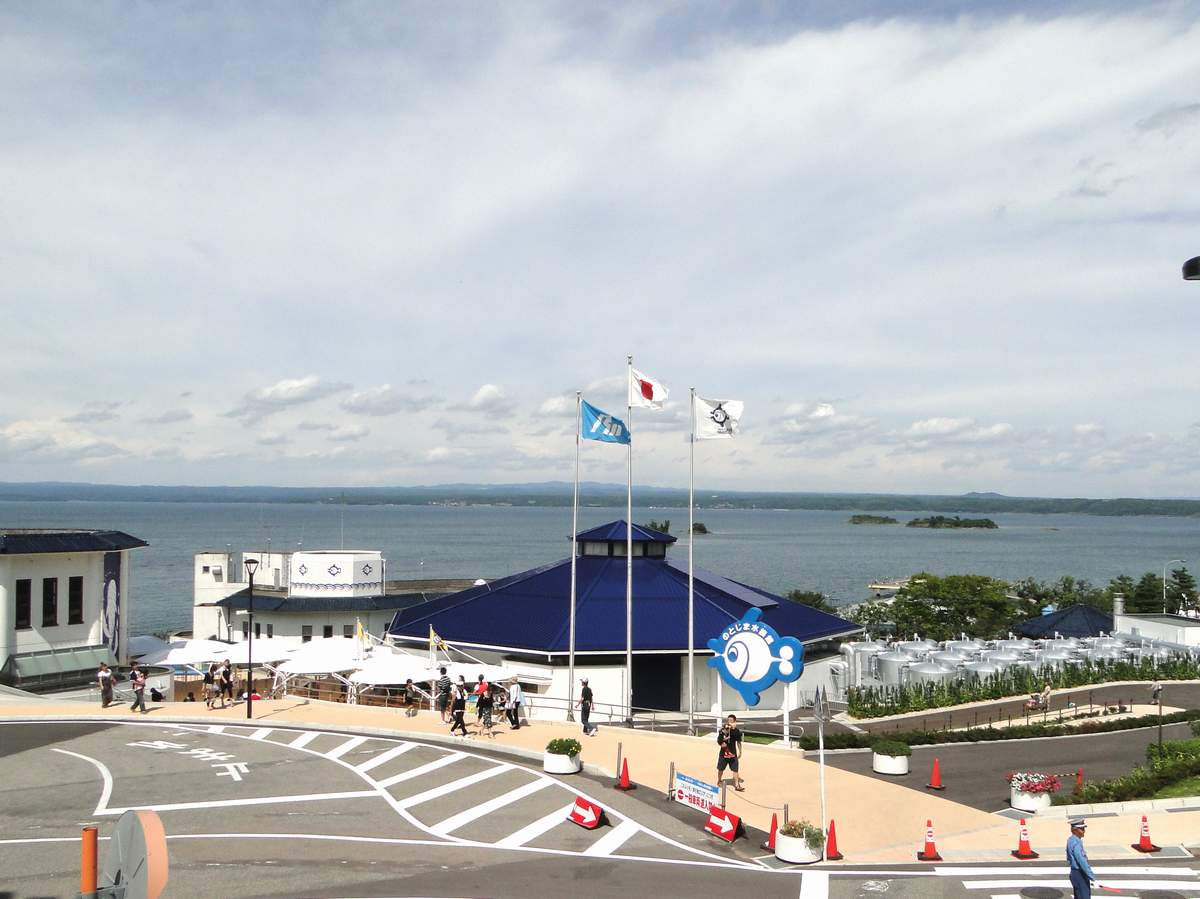

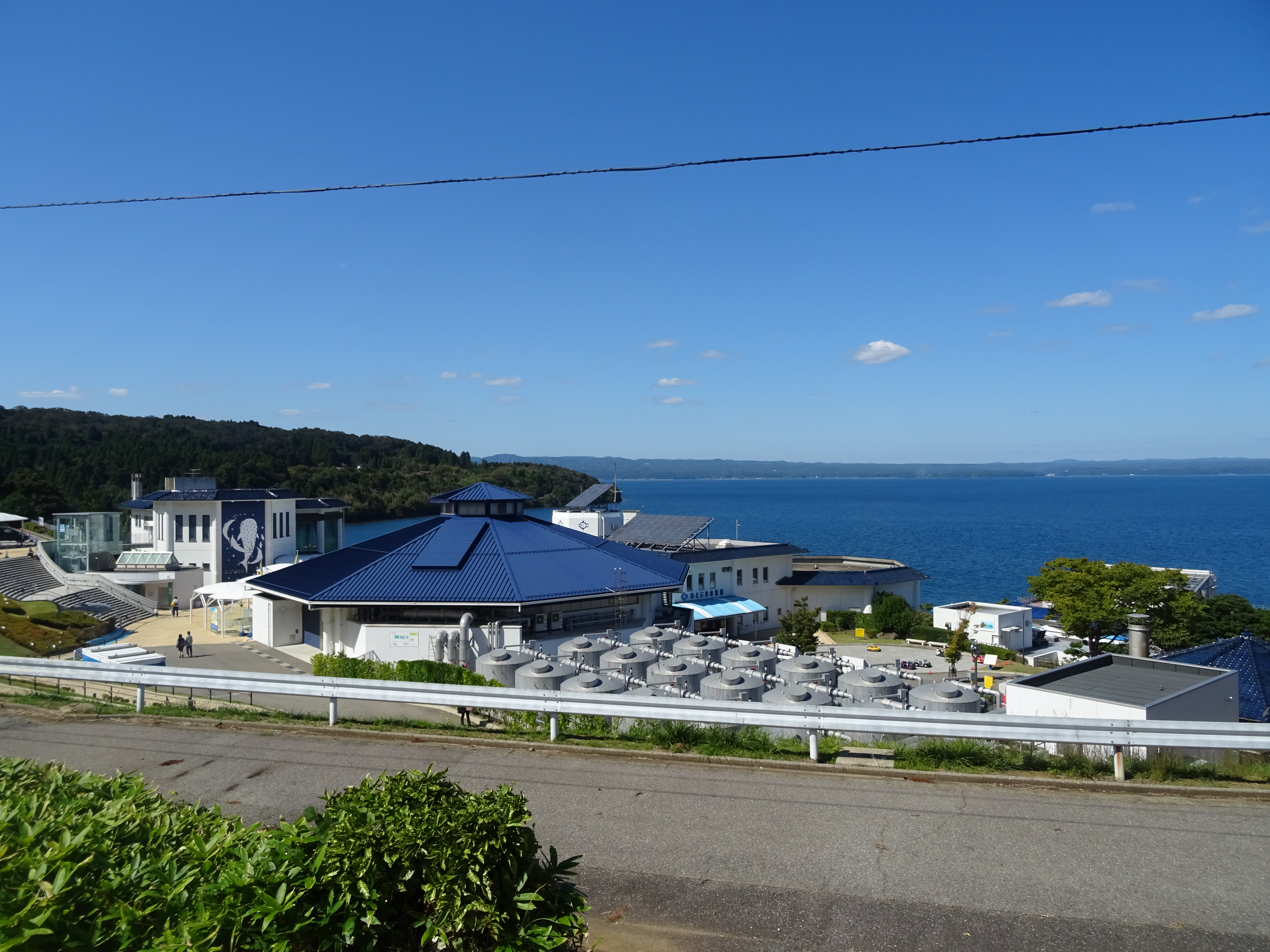

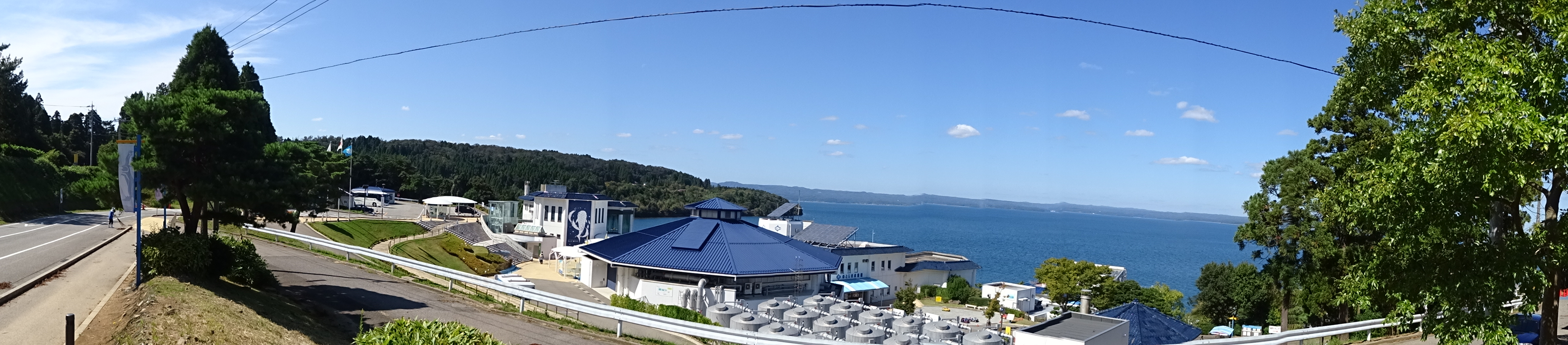

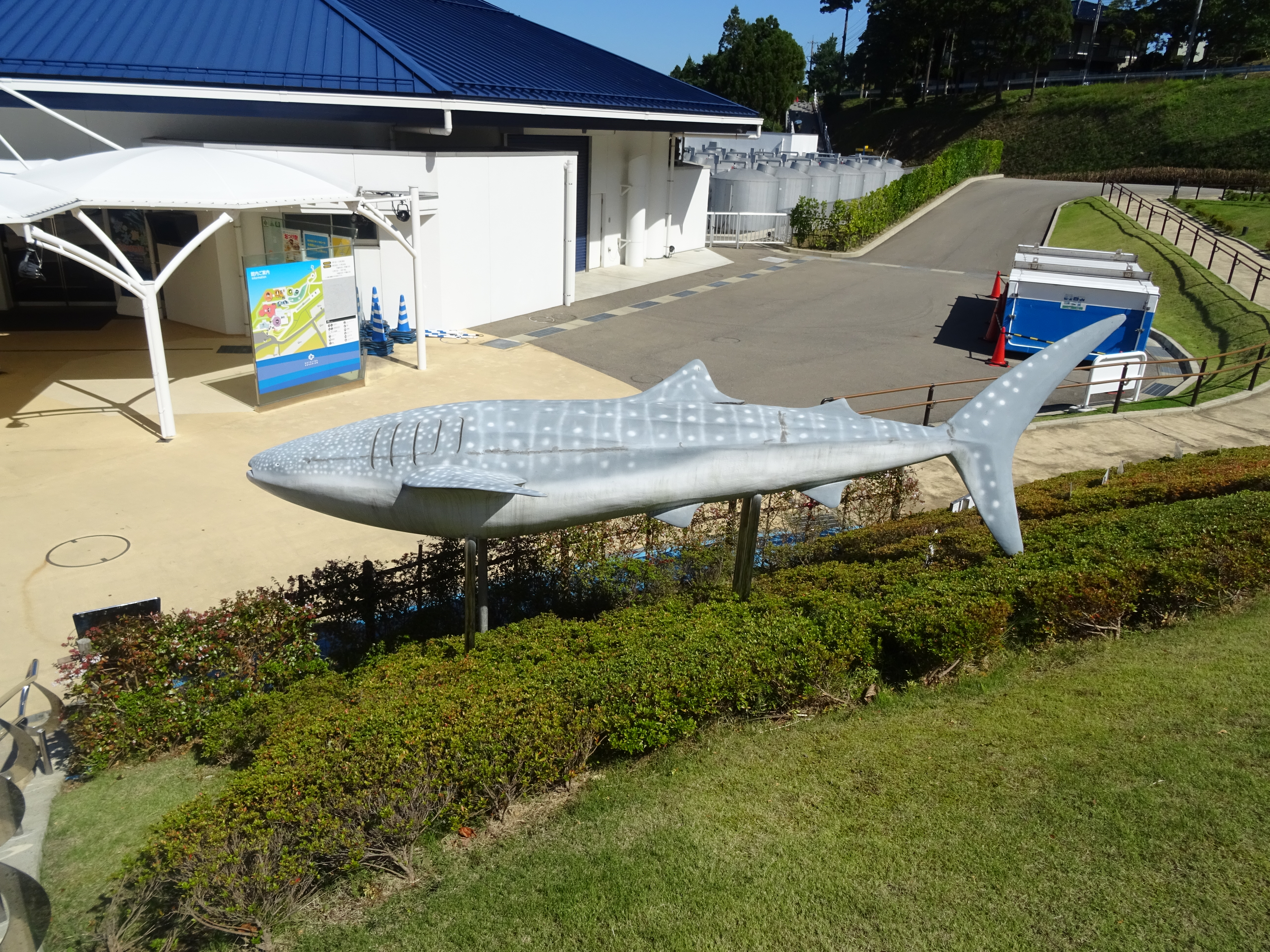

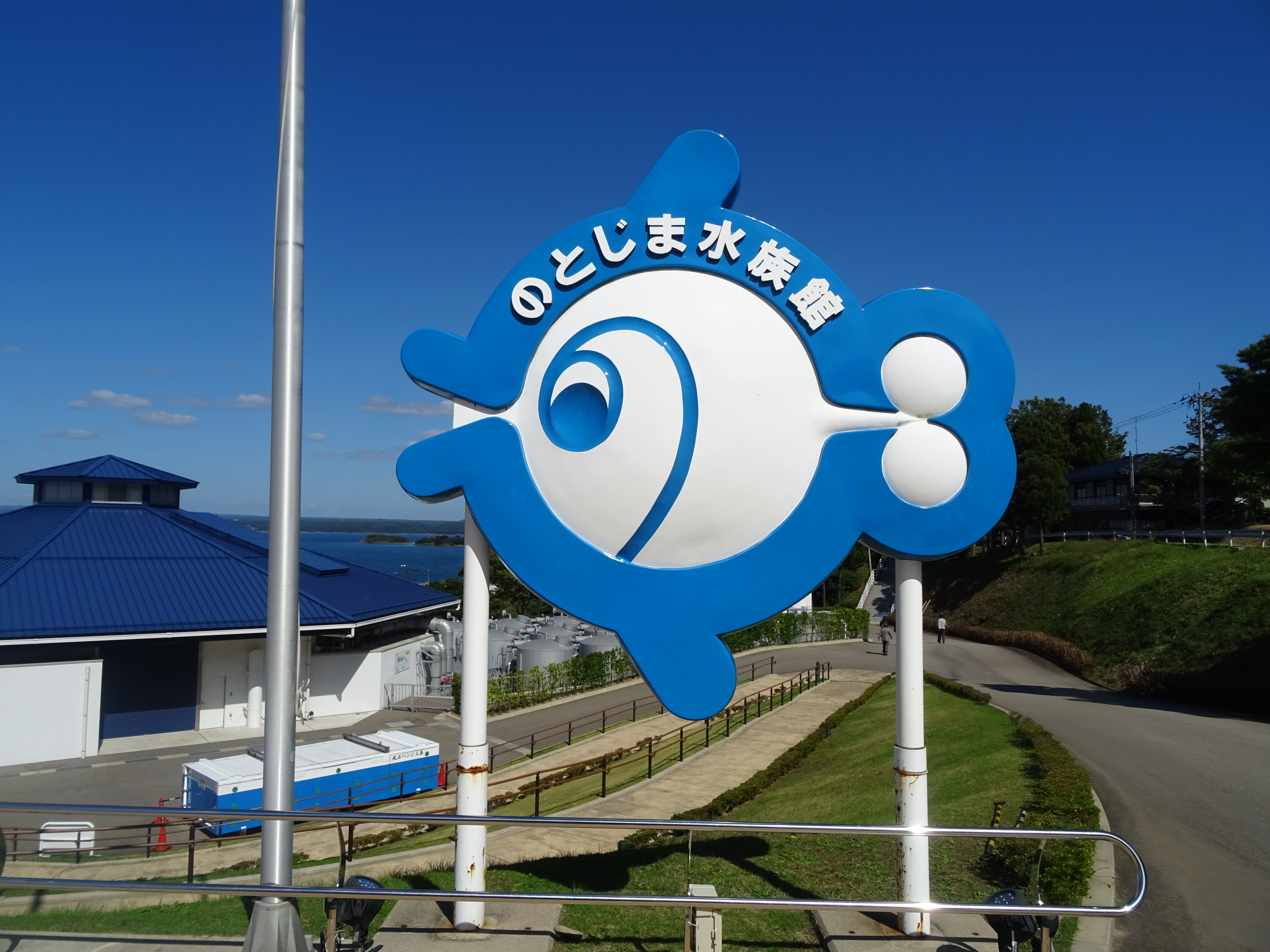

Fish tank

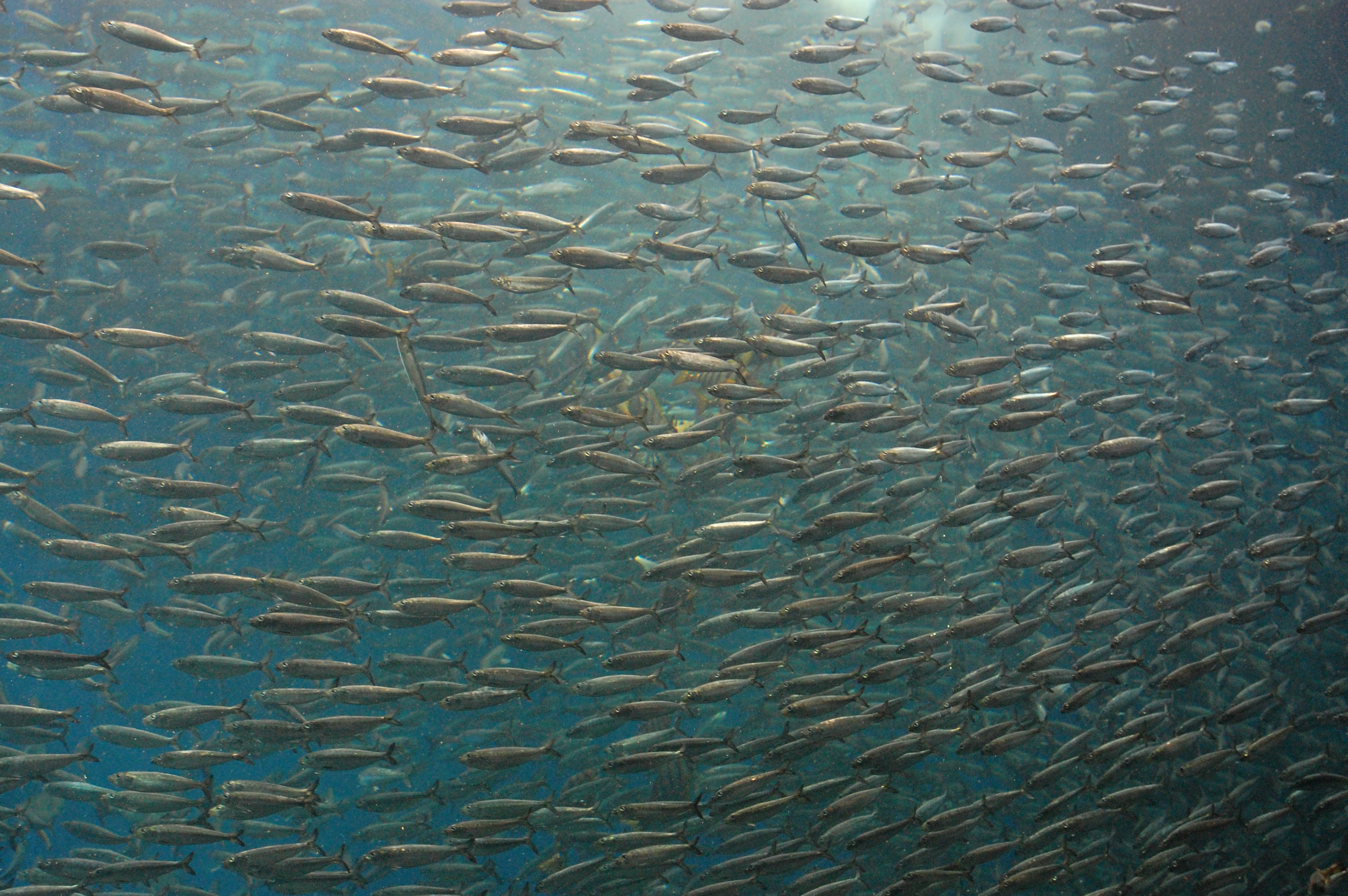

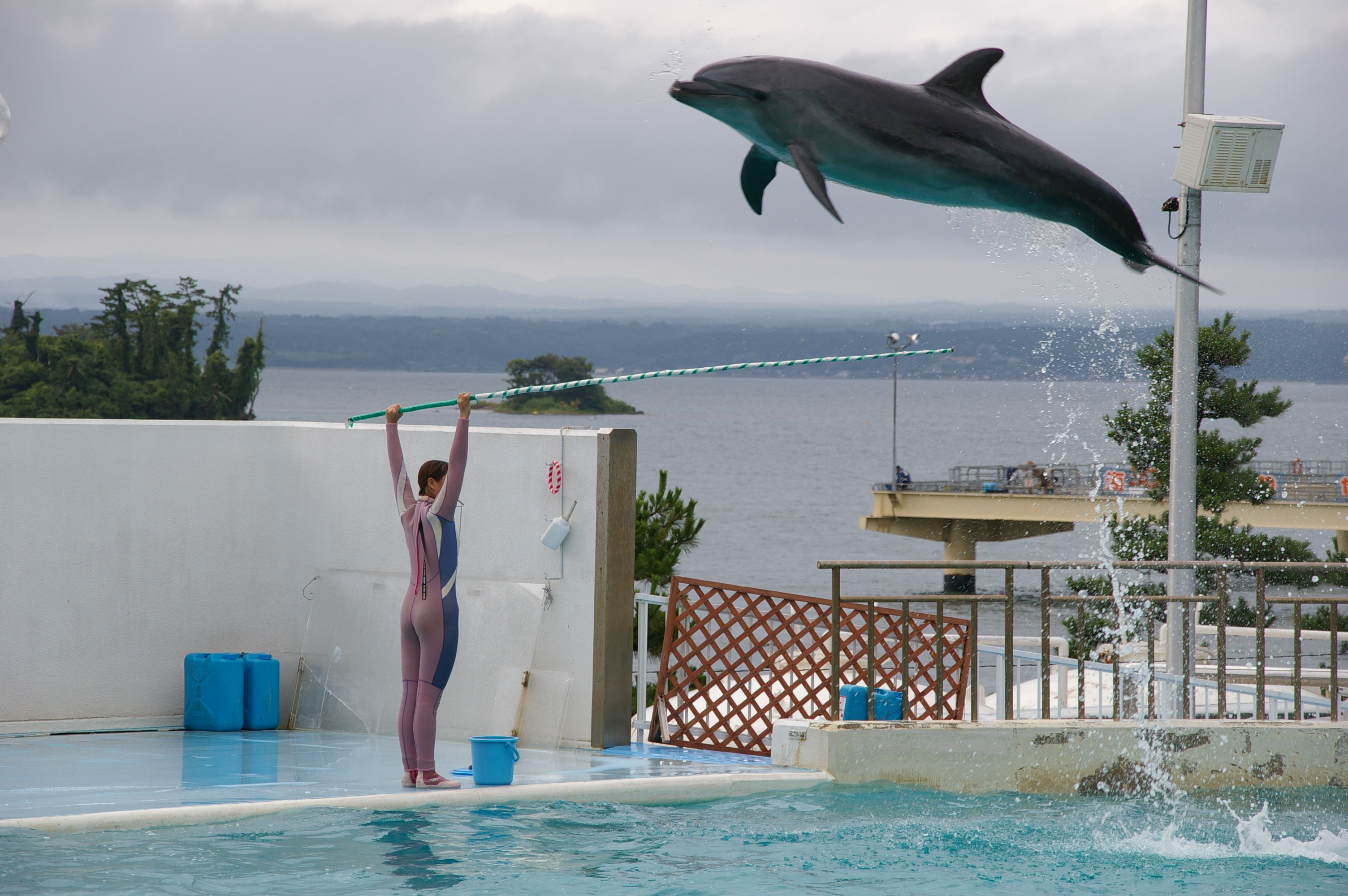

== See also ==
- Notojima
- Notojima, Ishikawa
