= Sandenkanaya Kofun =

- 散田金谷古墳 (Japanese)
- Sandenkanaya Kofun Sandenkanaya Kofun (Japan)
- 36°51′20″N 136°48′58″E
- Type: Kofun
- Periods: Kofun period
- Location: Hōdatsushimizu, Ishikawa, Japan
- Region: Hokuriku region

Site notes
- Public access: Yes (park)

The Sandenkanaya Kofun (散田金谷古墳)} is a late Kofun period burial tumulus located in the Sanden neighborhood of the town of Hōdatsushimizu, Ishikawa in the Hokuriku region of Japan. The tumulus was designated a National Historic Site of Japan in 1982.

== Overview ==
The Sandenkanaya Kofun is located a hill at the confluence of the Shio River and the Kose River at the base of the Noto Peninsula. The tumulus is an oval-shaped empun-style (円墳) kofun, with maximal length of 21 meters, partially surrounded by horseshoe-shaped moat three meters wide and 0.5 meters deep. The horizontal burial chamber opens to the southwest, and has a total length of 9.85 meters, length of 5.80 meters, width of 2.65 meters, and height of 2.76 meters and is the largest in the Hokuriku region. It is made of granite and andesite and the sarcophagus is made of granite.

- Major axis: 21meters
- Minor axis: 18.5 meters
- Height: 3.5 meters

This tomb was excavated by locals in 1903, and a house-shaped sarcophagus with a roofline decorated with chigi was found. It is an Ishikawa Prefectural Tangible Cultural Property. Grave goods included Sue ware, swords, bronze mirrors, beads and other jewellery, and horse fittings. The tumulus is believed to have been built in the latter half of the 6th century, based on excavated items. Restoration work on the tumulus was carried out from 1986 to 1988, and the tumulus was partially dismantled and repaired in 2006 to 2007.

Some of the excavated items are kept at the Tokyo National Museum. The site is open to the public as part of an archaeological park. The burial chamber can be viewed only from the outside. It is located about 20 minutes by car from Minami-Hakui Station on the JR West Nanao Line.

== See also ==
- List of Historic Sites of Japan (Ishikawa)
