= Nishi-Mattō Station =

Railway station in Hakusan, Ishikawa Prefecture, Japan

Nishi-Mattō Station 西松任駅
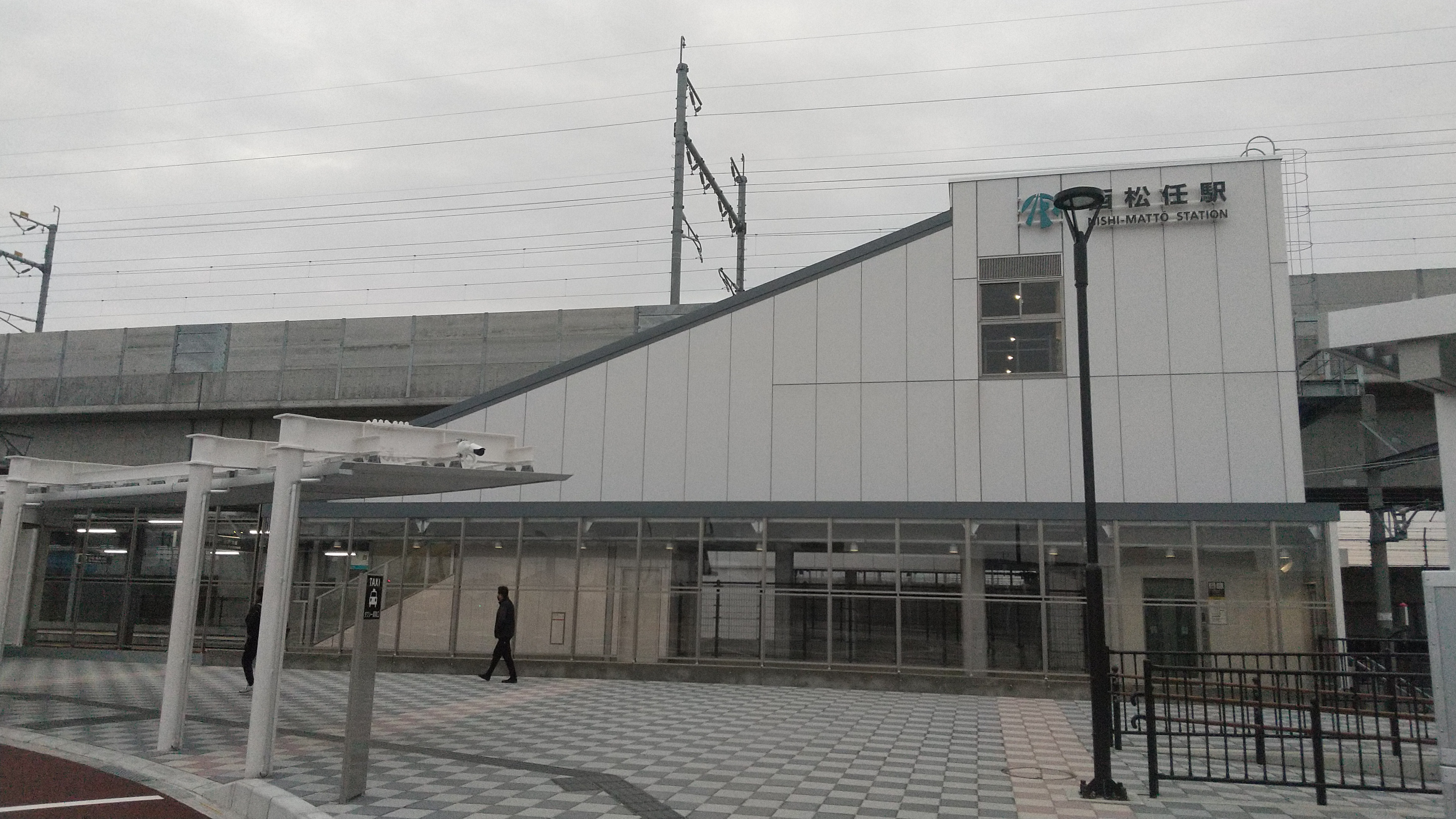
- Station building exterior on 17 March 2024

General information
- Location: 1832 Kitayasuda-cho, Hakusan City, Ishikawa Prefecture; Japan
- Coordinates: 36°31′3.68″N 136°32′56.08″E
- Operator: IR Ishikawa Railway
- Line: ■ IR Ishikawa Railway Line
- Distance: 165.3 km (102.7 mi) from Maibara
- Platforms: 2 side platforms
- Tracks: 2

Construction
- Structure type: At-grade

Other information
- Status: Unstaffed

History
- Opened: 16 March 2024; 2 years ago

Passengers
- 1870 passengers/day (estimated)
Location
- Location within Ishikawa Prefecture Location within Chubu region Location within Japan

Nishi-Mattō Station (西松任駅, Nishi-Mattō-eki) is a railway station on the IR Ishikawa Railway Line in the city of Hakusan, Ishikawa, Japan, operated by IR Ishikawa Railway. The station opened on 16 March 2024, in tandem with the extension of the Hokuriku Shinkansen to Tsuruga.

== Background ==
The construction of the new station was financed by the Japanese national government (through the Railway Transport Authority) and local governments.

The station is located in close proximity to the Hokuriku Shinkansen Hakusan General Rolling Stock Yard.

=== Services ===
Following the station's opening, the station is served by 44 eastbound trains (towards Kanazawa) and 45 westbound trains (towards Fukui) on weekdays and 42 eastbound trains and 44 westbound trains on weekends and holidays, which collectively provide a half-hourly service in both directions.

== Adjacent stations ==
«	Service	»
IR Ishikawa Railway Line
Kaga-Kasama	Local	Mattō

== See also ==
- List of railway stations in Japan
