= Mikawa, Ishikawa =

Dissolved municipality in Ishikawa prefecture, Japan

Mikawa (美川町, Mikawa-machi) was a town located in Ishikawa District, Ishikawa Prefecture, Japan.

As of 2003, the town had an estimated population of 12,918 and a density of 1,416.45 persons per km^{2}. The total area was 9.12 km^{2}.

On February 1, 2005, Mikawa, along with the city of Mattō, the town of Tsurugi, and the villages of Kawachi, Oguchi, Shiramine, Torigoe and Yoshinodani (all from Ishikawa District), was merged to create the city of Hakusan and no longer exists as an independent municipality.

A new joint-venture car assembly factory is scheduled to be built in the outskirts.
