= Hōdatsushimizu =

Hōdatsushimizu 宝達志水町
- Town
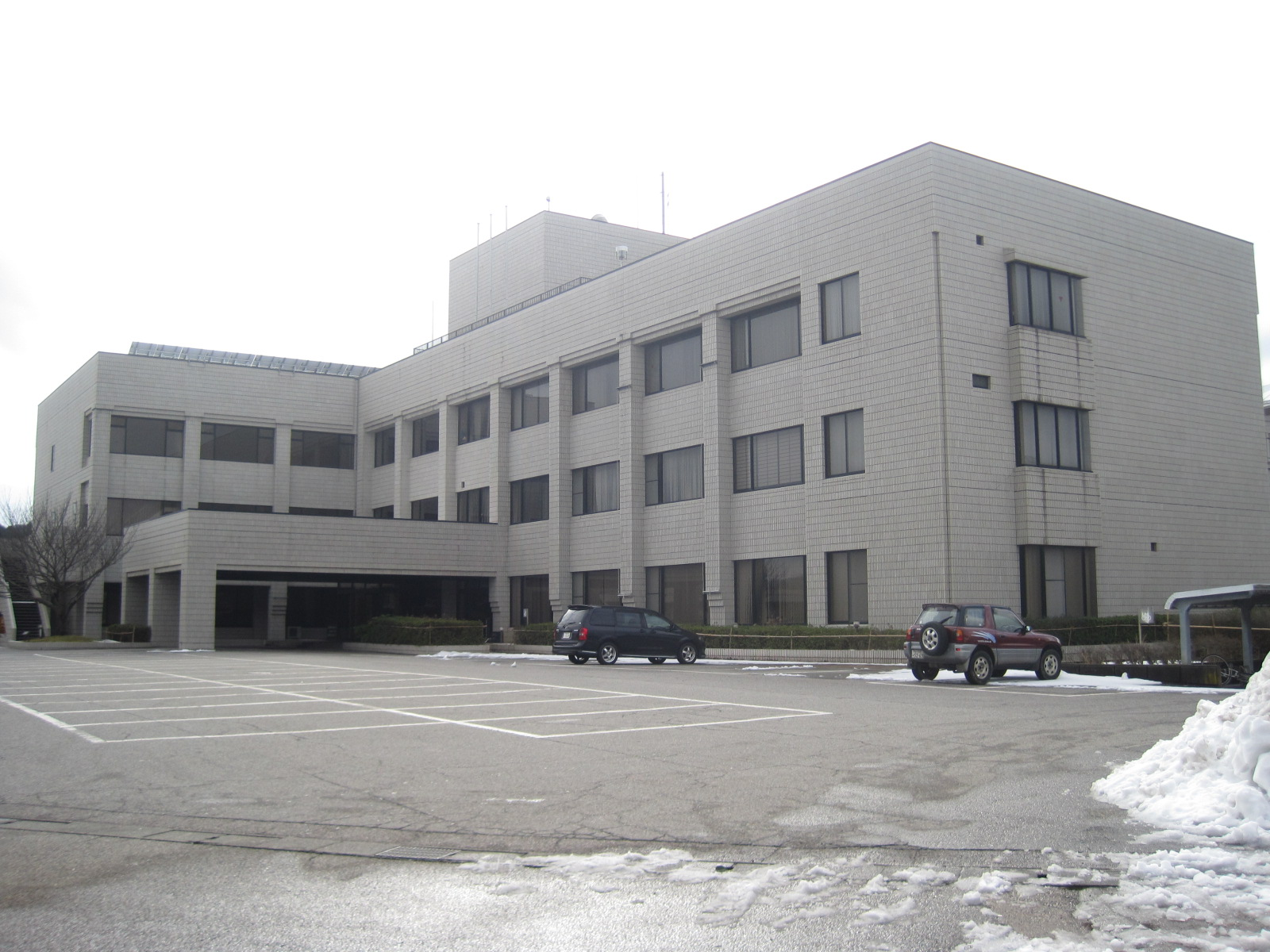
- Hōdatsushimizu Town Hall

- Flag Seal

- Location of Hōdatsushimizu in Ishikawa Prefecture

- Coordinates: 36°51′45.6″N 136°47′51.5″E
- Country: Japan
- Region: Chūbu; Hokuriku
- Prefecture: Ishikawa
- District: Hakui

Area
  - Total: 111.52 km^{2} (43.06 sq mi)

Population (January 31, 2018)
  - Total: 13,418
  - Density: 120.32/km^{2} (311.63/sq mi)
- Time zone: UTC+9 (Japan Standard Time)
- City symbols
- Tree: Fagus crenata
- Flower: Sakura
- Bird: Japanese bush warbler
- Phone number: 0767-29-3111
- Address: 18-1 Koura, Hōdatsushimizu-machi, Hakui-gun, Ishikawa-ken 925-0198
- Website: Official website

Hōdatsushimizu (宝達志水町, Hōdatsushimizu-chō) is a town located in Hakui District, Ishikawa Prefecture, Japan. As of 31 January 2018, the town had an estimated population of 13,418 in 4962 households, and a population density of 84 persons per km^{2}. The total area of the town was 111.52 square kilometres (43.06 sq mi). In 2013, the Food and Agriculture Organization recognised Hōdatsushimizu under its Globally Important Agricultural Heritage Systems (GIAHS) programme as a sustainable agricultural model.

== Geography ==
Hōdatsushimizu occupies the southern neck of Noto Peninsula, facing the Sea of Japan to the west and Toyama Prefecture to the east. It is one hour from Kanazawa by train. Mount Hōdatsu, the highest mountain in the Noto Peninsula, is in Hōdatsushimizu. The town has a humid subtropical climate (Köppen Cfa) characterized by mild summers and cold winters with heavy snowfall. The average annual temperature in Hōdatsushimizu is 13.3 °C. The average annual rainfall is 2435 mm with September as the wettest month. The temperatures are highest on average in August, at around 25.9 °C, and lowest in January, at around 2.1 °C.

=== Neighbouring municipalities ===
- Ishikawa Prefecture
  - Hakui
  - Kahoku
  - Tsubata
- Toyama Prefecture
  - Himi
  - Takaoka

== Demographics ==
Per Japanese census data, the population of Hōdatsushimizu has declined over the past 40 years.

Historical population
Year	Pop.	±%
1970	17,107	—
1980	17,115	+0.0%
1990	16,897	−1.3%
2000	15,891	−6.0%
2010	14,277	−10.2%
2020	12,121	−15.1%

== History ==
The area around Hōdatsushimizu has been settled since the Japanese Paleolithic period, and remnants of Jōmon period and Yayoi period settlements have been found in many areas. The area was part of ancient Noto Province from the Nara period. During the Sengoku Period, the area was contested between the Hatakeyama clan, Uesugi clan and Maeda clan. The Siege of Suemori (1584) occurred in what is now part of the town. The area became part of Kaga Domain under the Edo period Tokugawa shogunate, and was noted for its gold mine Following the Meiji restoration, the area was organised into Hakui District, Ishikawa.

The modern town of Hōdatsushimizu was formed March 1, 2005 from the merger of the towns of Oshimizu and Shio, and its name is a compound of these former names (Shio + Oshimizu).

== Economy ==
Agriculture is important to the local economy.

== Education ==
Hōdatsushimizu has five public elementary schools and one public middle school operated by the town government, and one public high school operated by the Ishikawa Prefectural Board of Education.

== Transportation ==
=== Railway ===
West Japan Railway Company - Nanao Line

- Menden - Hōdatsu - Shikinami

=== Highway ===
National Route 159
National Route 249
National Route 415
National Route 470
National Route 471

== Local attractions ==
- Chirihama Nagisa Driveway
- Mount Hōdatsu, Hōdatsu
- Sandenkanaya Kofun, National Historic Site
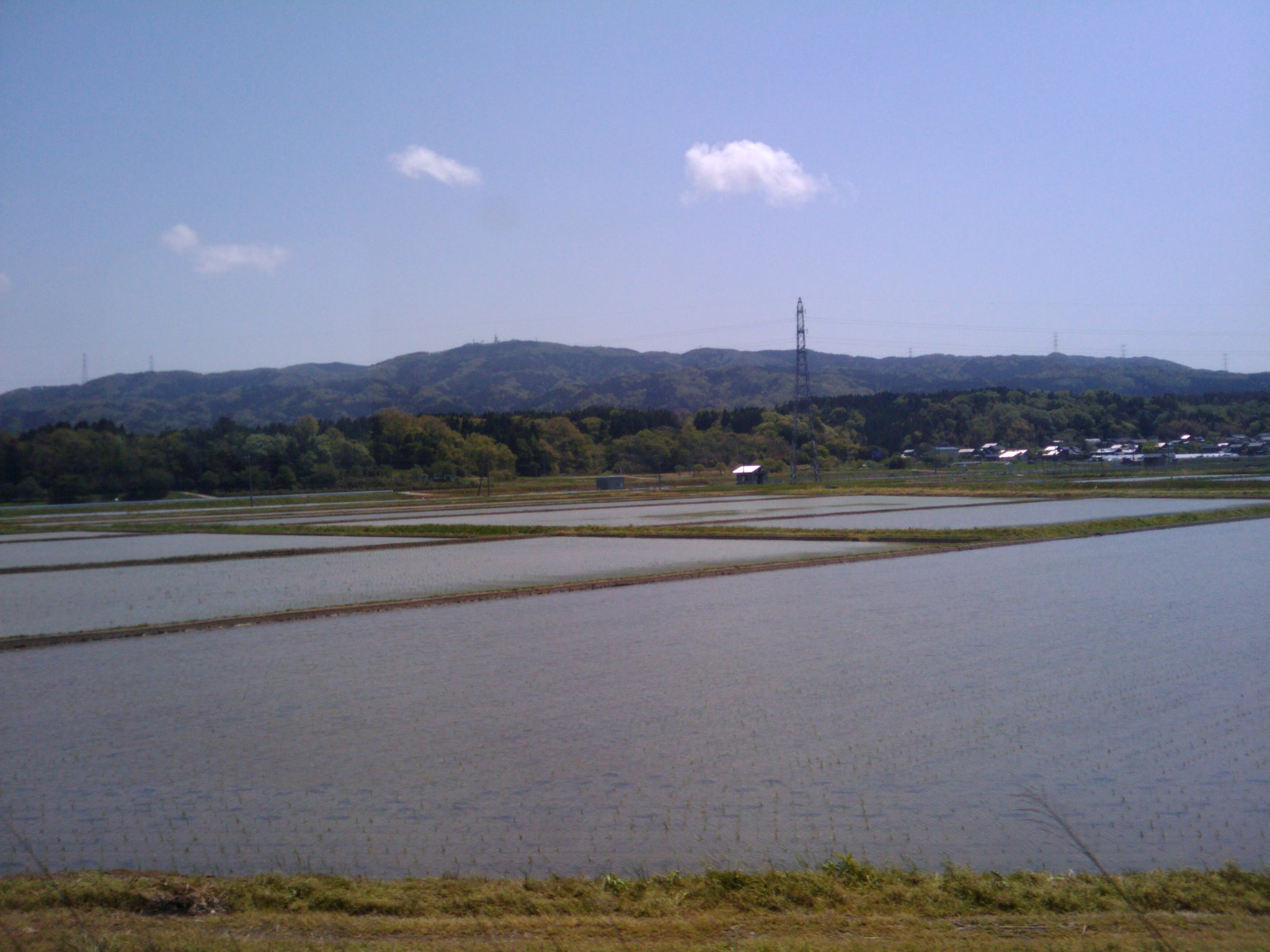
Mount Hodatsu

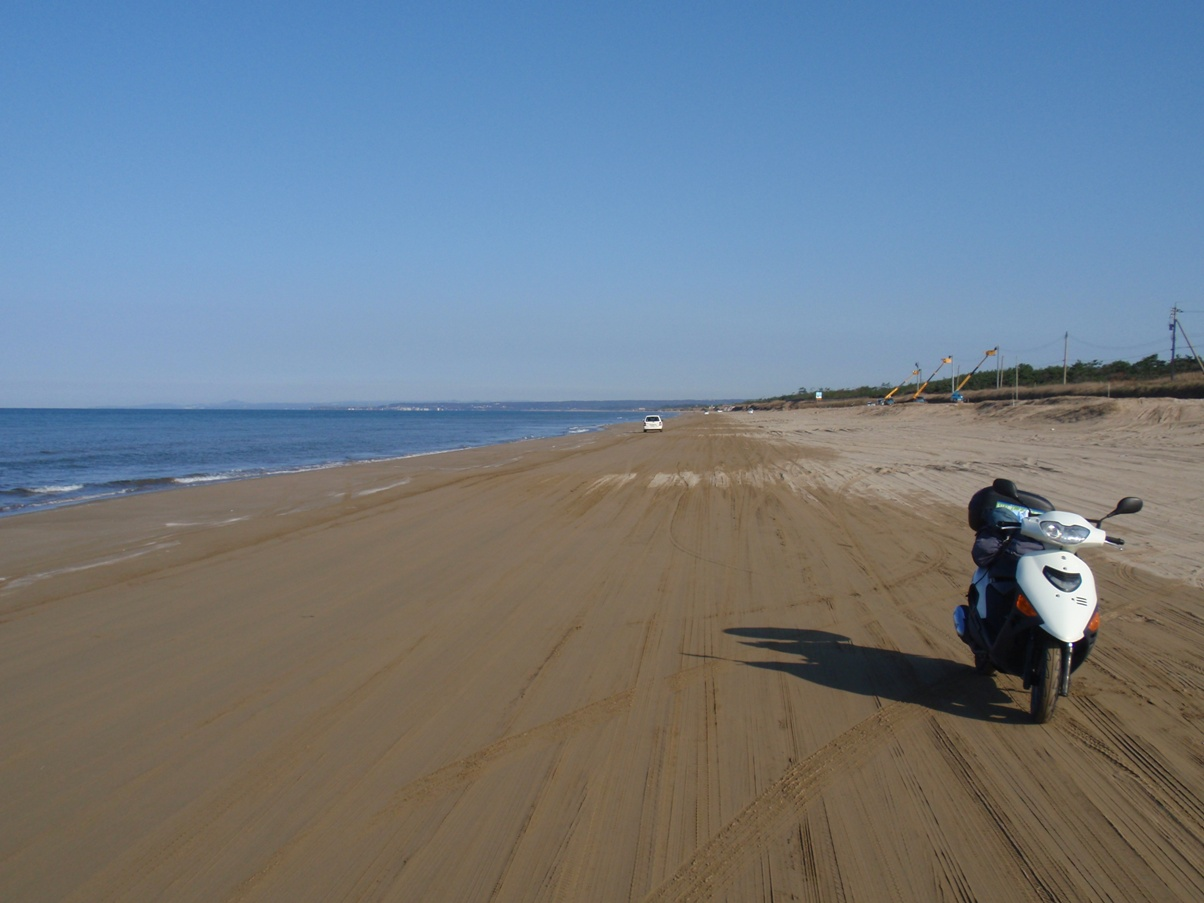
Chirihama-Nagisa drive-way

== Mascot ==
Hoppy-san, the town's mascot

Hōdatsushimizu's mascot is Hoppy-san (ほっぴーさん), a fairy from Mount Hodatsu. He is usually laid-back and calm. He tends to promote everything that his town has to offer and checks out any latest trends surrounding not just Hōdatsushimizu but also Japan and the rest of the world. He ends his sentences with "~dappi" (～だっぴ).
