= Kawachi, Ishikawa =

Dissolved municipality in Ishikawa prefecture, Japan

Kawachi (河内村, Kawachi-mura) was a village located in Ishikawa District, Ishikawa Prefecture, Japan.

As of 2003, the village had an estimated population of 1,168 and a density of 15.69 persons per km^{2}. The total area was 74.42 km^{2}.

On February 1, 2005, Kawachi, along with the city of Mattō, the towns of Mikawa and Tsurugi, and the villages of Oguchi, Shiramine, Torigoe and Yoshinodani (all from Ishikawa District), was merged to create the city of Hakusan and no longer exists as an independent municipality.
