= Oguchi, Ishikawa =

Dissolved municipality in Ishikawa prefecture, Japan

Oguchi (尾口村, Oguchi-mura) was a village located in Ishikawa District, Ishikawa Prefecture, Japan.

As of 2003, the village had an estimated population of 698 and a population density of 5.08 persons per km^{2}. The total area was 137.52 km^{2}.

On February 1, 2005, Oguchi, along with the city of Mattō, the towns of Mikawa and Tsurugi, and the villages of Kawachi, Shiramine, Torigoe and Yoshinodani (all from Ishikawa District), was merged to create the city of Hakusan and no longer exists as an independent municipality.
