= Yoshinodani, Ishikawa =

Dissolved municipality in Ishikawa prefecture, Japan

Yoshinodani (吉野谷村, Yoshinodani-mura) was a village located in Ishikawa District, Ishikawa Prefecture, Japan.

As of 2003, the village had an estimated population of 1,310 and a density of 9.17 persons per km^{2}. The total area was 142.89 km^{2}.

On February 1, 2005, Yoshinodani, along with the city of Mattō, the towns of Mikawa and Tsurugi, and the villages of Kawachi, Oguchi, Shiramine and Torigoe (all from Ishikawa District), was merged to create the city of Hakusan and no longer exists as an independent municipality.
