= Nakanoto =

Nakanoto 中能登町
- Town
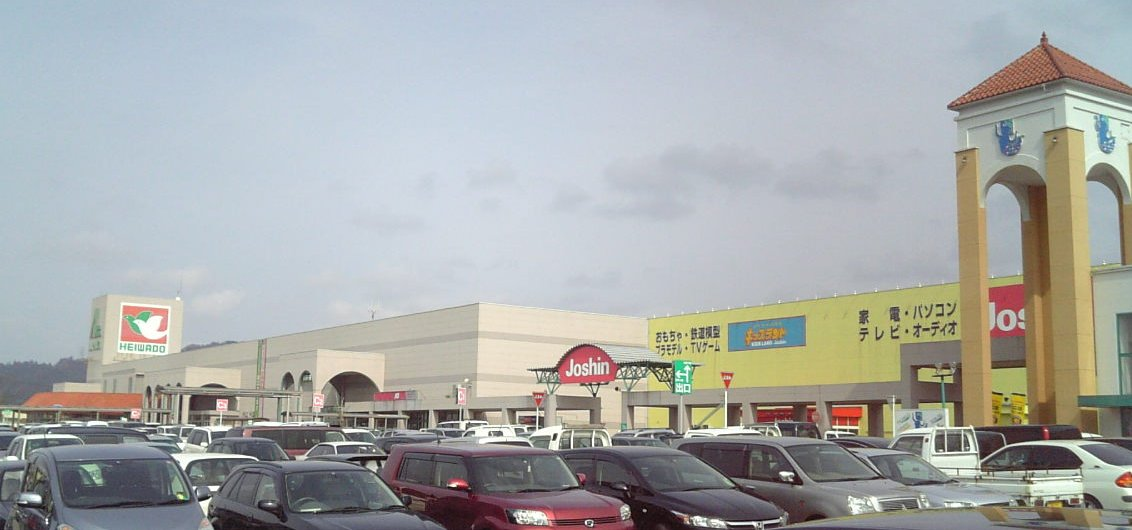
- Shopping center in Nakanoto

- Flag Seal

- Location of Nakanoto in Ishikawa Prefecture

- Coordinates: 36°59′22″N 136°54′5.3″E
- Country: Japan
- Region: Chūbu; Hokuriku
- Prefecture: Ishikawa
- District: Kashima

Area
  - Total: 89.45 km^{2} (34.54 sq mi)

Population (February 1, 2018)
  - Total: 18,278
  - Density: 204.3/km^{2} (529.2/sq mi)
- Time zone: UTC+9 (Japan Standard Time)
- City symbols
- Tree: Sakura
- Flower: Lilium
- Bird: Japanese bush-warbler
- Phone number: 0767-74-1234
- Address: 9-46 Suezaka, Nakanoto-cho, Kashima-gun, Ishikawa-ken 929-1792
- Website: Official website

Nakanoto (中能登町, Nakanoto-machi) is a town located in Kashima District, Ishikawa Prefecture, Japan. As of 1 February 2018, the town had an estimated population of 18,278 in 6,625 households, and a population density of 84 persons per km^{2}. The total area of the town was 246.76 square kilometres (95.27 sq mi).

== Geography ==
Nakanoto occupies the base of Noto Peninsula and is bordered by Toyama Prefecture to the south. Natural features of Nakanoto include Mount Sekidou and Fudo waterfall. It is one and a half hours from Kanazawa by train. Nakanoto has a humid subtropical climate (Köppen Cfa) characterized by mild summers and cold winters with heavy snowfall. The average annual temperature in Nakanoto is 13.7 °C. The average annual rainfall is 2411 mm with September as the wettest month. The temperatures are highest on average in August, at around 26.1 °C, and lowest in January, at around 2.8 °C.

=== Neighbouring municipalities ===
- Ishikawa Prefecture
  - Hakui
  - Nanao
  - Shika
- Toyama Prefecture
  - Himi

== Demographics ==
Per Japanese census data, the population of Nakanoto has declined over the past 50 years.

Historical population
Year	Pop.	±%
1970	23,181	—
1980	22,475	−3.0%
1990	20,678	−8.0%
2000	19,149	−7.4%
2010	18,535	−3.2%
2020	16,540	−10.8%

== History ==
The area around Nakanoto was part of ancient Noto Province. During the Sengoku Period (1467–1568), the area was contested between the Hatakeyama clan, Uesugi clan and Maeda clan, with the area becoming part of Kaga Domain under the Edo period Tokugawa shogunate. Following the Meiji restoration, the area was organised into Kashima District, Ishikawa.

The town was founded on March 1, 2005, from the merger of three towns in the district: Kashima, Rokusei, and Toriya.

== Education ==
Nakanoto has three public elementary schools and one public middle school operated by the town government, and one public high school operated by the Ishikawa Prefectural Board of Education.

== Transportation ==
=== Railway ===
West Japan Railway Company - Nanao Line

- Kanemaru - Notobe - Yoshikawa - Noto-Ninomiya

=== Highway ===
National Route 159

== Local attractions ==
- Amanomiya Kofun Cluster

== Mascot ==
Orihime, the town's mascot

Nakanoto's mascot is Orihime (おりひめ), created on 2012, based on the local legend of two Orihime. Her birthday is 7 July.
