= Tsurugi, Ishikawa =

Tsurugi, Ishikawa 鶴来町
- Former settlement
- Interactive map of Tsurugi, Ishikawa
- Country: Japan
- Prefecture: Ishikawa
- District: Ishikawa District, Ishikawa

Tsurugi (鶴来町, Tsurugi-machi) was a town located in Ishikawa District, Ishikawa Prefecture, Japan.

As of 2003, the town had an estimated population of 22,103 and a density of 620.17 persons per km^{2}. The total area was 35.64 km^{2}.

On February 1, 2005, Tsurugi, along with the city of Mattō, the town of Mikawa, and the villages of Kawachi, Oguchi, Shiramine, Torigoe and Yoshinodani (all from Ishikawa District), was merged to create the city of Hakusan and no longer exists as an independent municipality.
