= Kashima District, Ishikawa =

District in the Ishikawa Prefecture

Coordinates: 36.980°N 136.902°E

Kashima District in Ishikawa Prefecture.

Kashima (鹿島郡, Kashima-gun) is a district located in Ishikawa Prefecture, Japan.

As of April 1, 2005 population data, the district has an estimated population of 18,952 with a density of 212 persons per km^{2}. The total area is 89.36& km^{2}.

== Municipalities ==
The district consists of one town:

- Nakanoto (Note: Classified as a town.)

== History ==
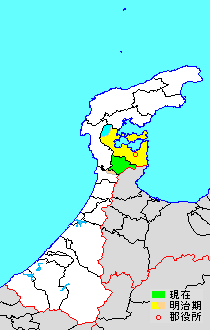
Map showing original extent of Kashima District in Ishikawa Prefecture: * yellow - areas formerly within the district borders during the early Meiji period: 1. Nakanoto-machi

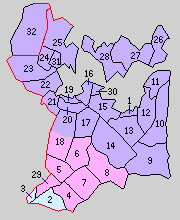
Colored areas are in this district.

=== Recent mergers ===
- On October 1, 2004 - The towns of Nakajima, Tatsuruhama and Notojima were merged into the expanded city of Nanao.
- On March 1, 2005 - The towns of Kashima, Toriya and Rokusei were merged to form the town of Nakanoto.
