= Notojima, Ishikawa =

Dissolved municipality in Ishikawa prefecture, Japan

Notojima (能登島町, Notojima-machi) was a town coincident with Notojima island in Kashima District, Ishikawa Prefecture, Japan. It was formed February 1, 1955 by merger of the three villages on Notojima island.

As of 2003, the town had an estimated population of 3,187 and a density of 68.13 persons per km^{2}. The total area was 46.78 km^{2}.

The Hirokami, Niigata was the sister city of Notojima.

On October 1, 2004, Notojima, along with the towns of Nakajima and Tatsuruhama (all from Kashima District), was merged into the expanded city of Nanao and no longer exists as an independent municipality.

== Sights ==
- At the Notojima Aquarium visitors can watch dolphin and seal shows, animal feeding and meet many species in the 'touch and feel' tank. The aquarium also has a collection of jellyfish. In addition, whale sharks also live in the facility newly established in 2010.
- The Notojima Glass Museum is the only public specialized glass art museum in Japan. The open space outside the Museum also has 14 glass sculptures.
