= Shika =

Shika 志賀町
- Town
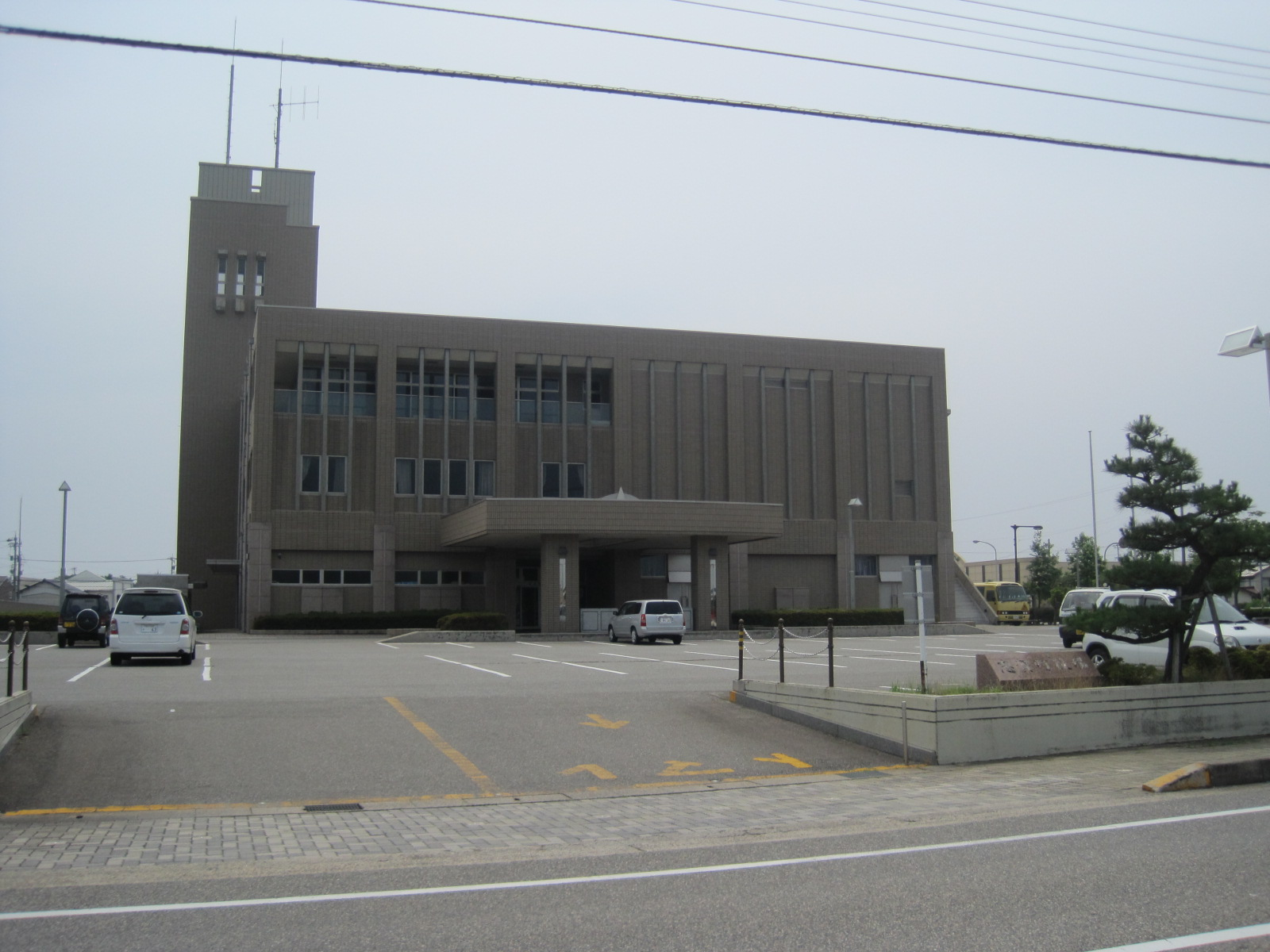
- Shika Town Hall

- Flag Seal

- Location of Shika in Ishikawa Prefecture

- Coordinates: 37°0′22.3″N 136°46′40.9″E
- Country: Japan
- Region: Chūbu; Hokuriku
- Prefecture: Ishikawa
- District: Hakui

Government
  - -Mayor: Masaru Koizumi

Area
  - Total: 246.76 km^{2} (95.27 sq mi)

Population (January 31, 2018)
  - Total: 20,845
  - Density: 84.475/km^{2} (218.79/sq mi)
- Time zone: UTC+9 (Japan Standard Time)
- Phone number: 0767-32-1111
- Address: 1-1 Sueyoshi Senko, Shika-machi, Hakui-gun, Ishikawa-ken 925-0198
- Climate: Cfa
- Website: Official website
- Symbols
- Flower: Rosa rugosa
- Tree: Ilex integra

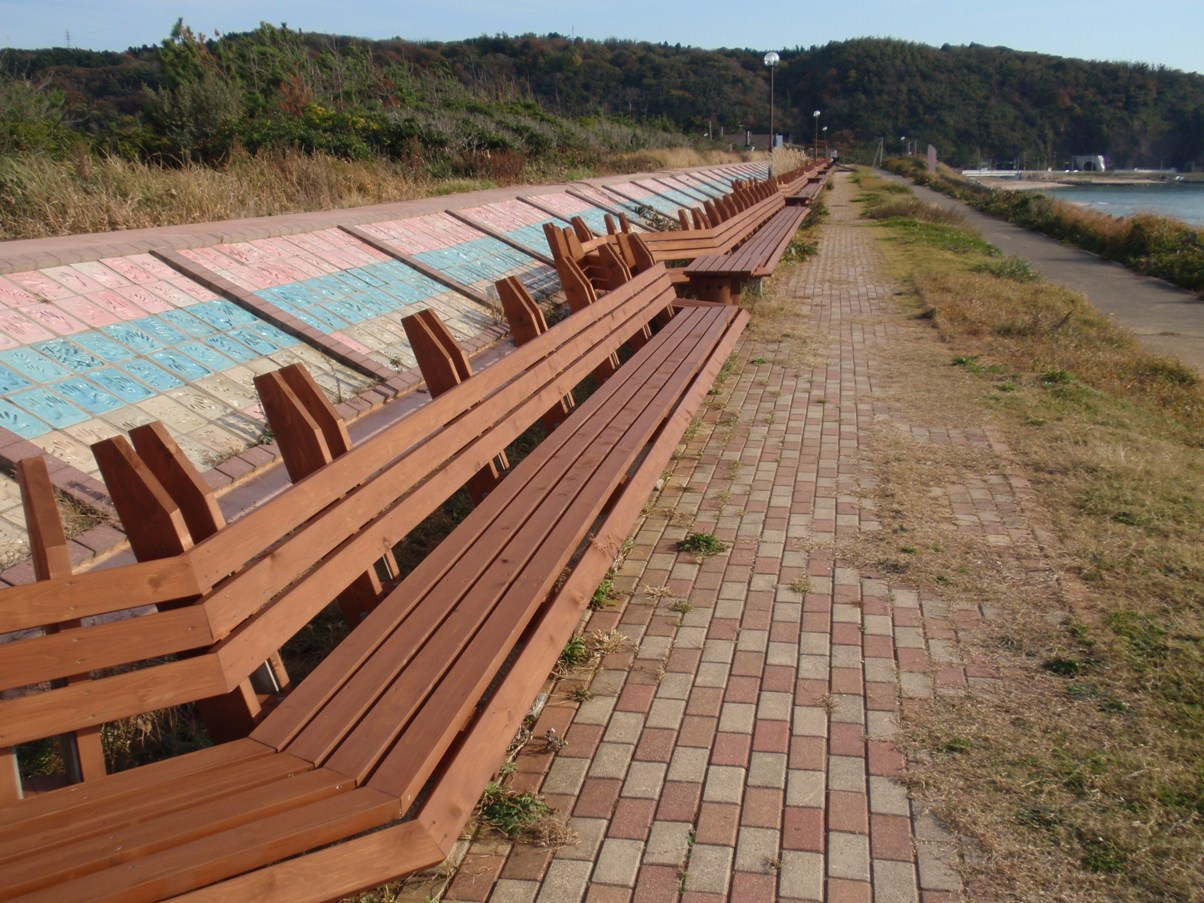
The longest bench in the world at Masuho Beach

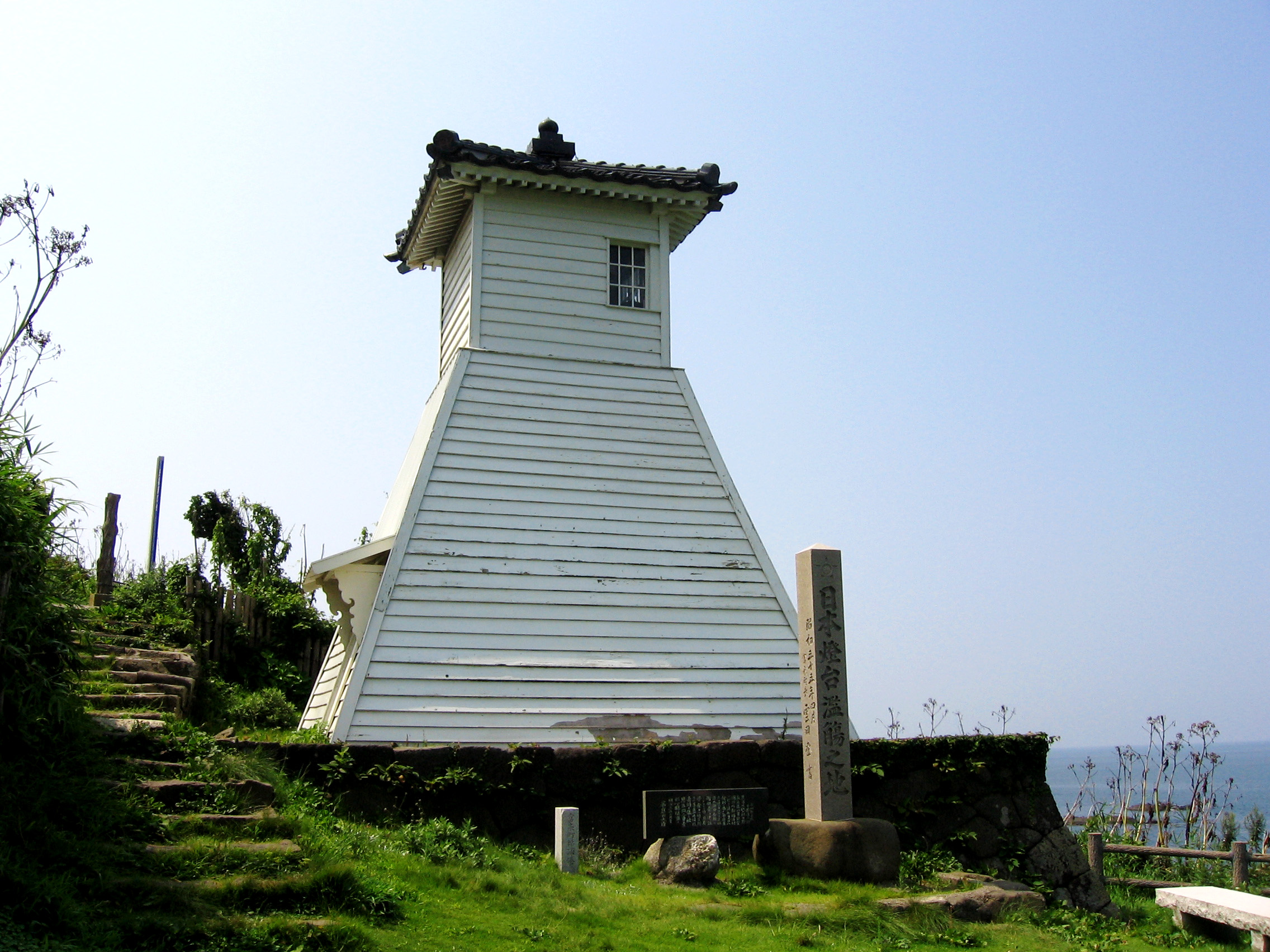
A lighthouse in the town

Shika (志賀町, Shika-machi) is a town located in Hakui District, Ishikawa Prefecture, Japan. As of 31 January 2018, the town had an estimated population of 20,845 in 8090 households, and a population density of 84 persons per km^{2}. The total area of the town is 246.76 square kilometres (95.27 sq mi).

== Geography ==
Shika occupies the southwestern coastline of Noto Peninsula, facing the Sea of Japan on the west. It is one and a half hours from Kanazawa by car. Shika has a humid subtropical climate (Köppen Cfa) characterized by mild summers and cold winters with heavy snowfall. The average annual temperature in Shika is 13.3 °C. The average annual rainfall is 2405 mm with September as the wettest month. The temperatures are highest on average in August, at around 25.7 °C, and lowest in January, at around 2.5 °C.

Part of the town is within the limits of the Noto Hantō Quasi-National Park.

=== Neighbouring municipalities ===
- Ishikawa Prefecture
  - Anamizu
  - Hakui
  - Nakanoto
  - Nanao
  - Wajima

=== Climate ===
Climate data for Shika (1991−2020 normals, extremes 1978−present)
Month	Jan	Feb	Mar	Apr	May	Jun	Jul	Aug	Sep	Oct	Nov	Dec	Year
Record high °C (°F)	16.5 (61.7)	18.6 (65.5)	23.1 (73.6)	27.1 (80.8)	31.2 (88.2)	34.4 (93.9)	37.3 (99.1)	40.1 (104.2)	37.0 (98.6)	31.6 (88.9)	24.7 (76.5)	19.8 (67.6)	40.1 (104.2)
Mean daily maximum °C (°F)	7.1 (44.8)	7.5 (45.5)	10.7 (51.3)	16.1 (61.0)	21.1 (70.0)	24.9 (76.8)	28.5 (83.3)	30.8 (87.4)	26.9 (80.4)	21.5 (70.7)	15.7 (60.3)	10.2 (50.4)	18.4 (65.2)
Daily mean °C (°F)	3.6 (38.5)	3.7 (38.7)	6.3 (43.3)	11.3 (52.3)	16.4 (61.5)	20.6 (69.1)	24.7 (76.5)	26.4 (79.5)	22.3 (72.1)	16.7 (62.1)	11.2 (52.2)	6.4 (43.5)	14.1 (57.4)
Mean daily minimum °C (°F)	0.2 (32.4)	−0.2 (31.6)	1.4 (34.5)	6.0 (42.8)	11.4 (52.5)	16.5 (61.7)	21.3 (70.3)	22.5 (72.5)	18.2 (64.8)	11.9 (53.4)	6.5 (43.7)	2.5 (36.5)	9.9 (49.7)
Record low °C (°F)	−11.3 (11.7)	−9.1 (15.6)	−5.6 (21.9)	−3.8 (25.2)	0.5 (32.9)	6.7 (44.1)	12.1 (53.8)	12.7 (54.9)	7.0 (44.6)	1.0 (33.8)	−1.4 (29.5)	−3.9 (25.0)	−11.3 (11.7)
Average precipitation mm (inches)	152.6 (6.01)	101.5 (4.00)	105.7 (4.16)	105.2 (4.14)	107.6 (4.24)	151.9 (5.98)	203.8 (8.02)	172.5 (6.79)	173.9 (6.85)	134.7 (5.30)	170.9 (6.73)	197.7 (7.78)	1,775 (69.88)
Average precipitation days (≥ 1.0 mm)	22.6	17.1	15.0	11.1	10.1	10.2	11.7	9.2	11.4	12.2	16.6	22.6	169.8
Mean monthly sunshine hours	58.7	92.0	152.8	194.6	206.8	165.7	154.4	207.8	155.9	155.8	107.2	62.7	1,713.5
Source: Japan Meteorological Agency

== Demographics ==
Per Japanese census data, the population of Shika has declined over the past 50 years.

Historical population
Year	Pop.	±%
1970	31,323	—
1980	30,636	−2.2%
1990	28,782	−6.1%
2000	25,396	−11.8%
2010	22,216	−12.5%
2020	18,630	−16.1%

== History ==
The area around Shika was part of ancient Noto Province. During the Sengoku Period (1467–1568), the area was contested between the Hatakeyama clan, Uesugi clan and Maeda clan, with the area becoming part of Kaga Domain under the Edo period Tokugawa shogunate. Following the Meiji restoration, the area was organised into Hakui District, Ishikawa, and the village of Shika was established with the creation of the modern municipalities system on April 1, 1889. Shika was raised to town status on February 1, 1936. On September 1, 2005, the former town of Togi was annexed by Shika.

On January 9, 2015, a resident reported a wooden boat to the local police, which was washed up on the shore. Due to Hangul characters on the boat it was suspected to be from North Korea. The police arrested one man on the boat, who claimed he had left North Korea unintended in mid-December 2014 when conducting an inspection of the boat.

On January 1, 2024, the region experienced intense shaking due to the 2024 Noto earthquake. The town experienced the highest possible intensity on the Shindo scale - 7, and 23 people were killed. It was also among the first to receive a major tsunami warning since the 2011 Tōhoku earthquake.

== Economy ==
Once a centre for the garment manufacturing industry, the local economy is now dominated by the presence of the Shika Nuclear Power Plant operated by Hokuriku Electric Power Company. Commercial fishing and agriculture are also important to the local economy.

== Education ==
Shika has two public elementary schools and two public middle schools operated by the town government, and one public high school operated by the Ishikawa Prefectural Board of Education.

== Transportation ==
=== Railway ===
- The town has no passenger railway service since the closure of the Hokuriku Railway's Noto Line on June 25, 1972.

=== Highway ===
National Route 249

== International relations ==
Shika has no sister cities. Its friendship cities are:

- Karawang, Indonesia, since January 25, 1999
- Colwood, Canada, since May 11, 1999

== Local attractions ==
- Fukura Lighthouse, built in 1867, the oldest wooden lighthouse in Japan
- Mount Takatsume
- Noto Kongo coastline
