= Shiramine, Ishikawa =

Dissolved municipality in Ishikawa prefecture, Japan

Coordinates: 36.138168°N 136.677913°E

Shiramine (白峰村, Shiramine-mura) is the southernmost part of Hakusan, Ishikawa Prefecture, Japan. It was once registered as a village and a part of Ishikawa District, but on February 1, 2005, Shiramine, along with the city of Mattō, the towns of Mikawa and Tsurugi, and the villages of Kawachi, Oguchi, Torigoe and Yoshinodani (all from Ishikawa District), was merged to create the city of Hakusan, and thus it no longer exists as an independent municipality.

As of 2003, the village had an estimated population of 1,131 and a density of 5.11 persons per km^{2}. The total area was 221.50 km^{2}. Today Shiramine is promoted to visitors through its nature, culture, and geography. Local attractions include the Hakusan Folk Museum, the Hakusan Dinosaur Park Shiramine, Shiramine Onsen Soyu, the Tedori River Development Museum, and the Hakusan Sabo Science Museum.

== See also ==
- Groups of Traditional Buildings
