= Hakusan, Ishikawa =

Hakusan 白山市
- City
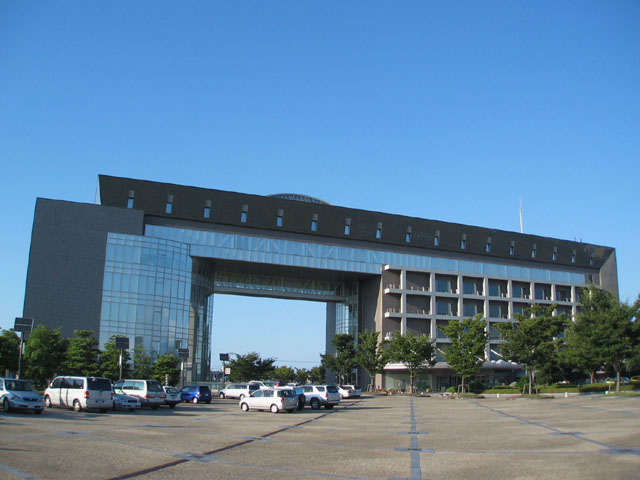
- Hakusan City Hall

- Flag Emblem

- Location of Hakusan in Ishikawa Prefecture

- Coordinates: 36°30′59.9″N 136°33′56.1″E
- Country: Japan
- Region: Chūbu (Hokuriku)
- Prefecture: Ishikawa Prefecture
- Matsutō city settled: October 10, 1970
- Changed to current name: February 1, 2005

Government
  - - Mayor: Toshikazu Tamura

Area
  - Total: 754.93 km^{2} (291.48 sq mi)

Population (December 31, 2019)
  - Total: 113,715
  - Density: 150.63/km^{2} (390.13/sq mi)
- Time zone: UTC+9 (Japan Standard Time)
- Phone number: 076-276-1111
- Address: 2-1 Kuramitsu, Hakusan-shi, Ishikawa-ken 924-8688
- Climate: Cfa
- Website: Official website
- Symbols
- Bird: Japanese bush-warbler
- Flower: Morning glory
- Tree: Japanese beech

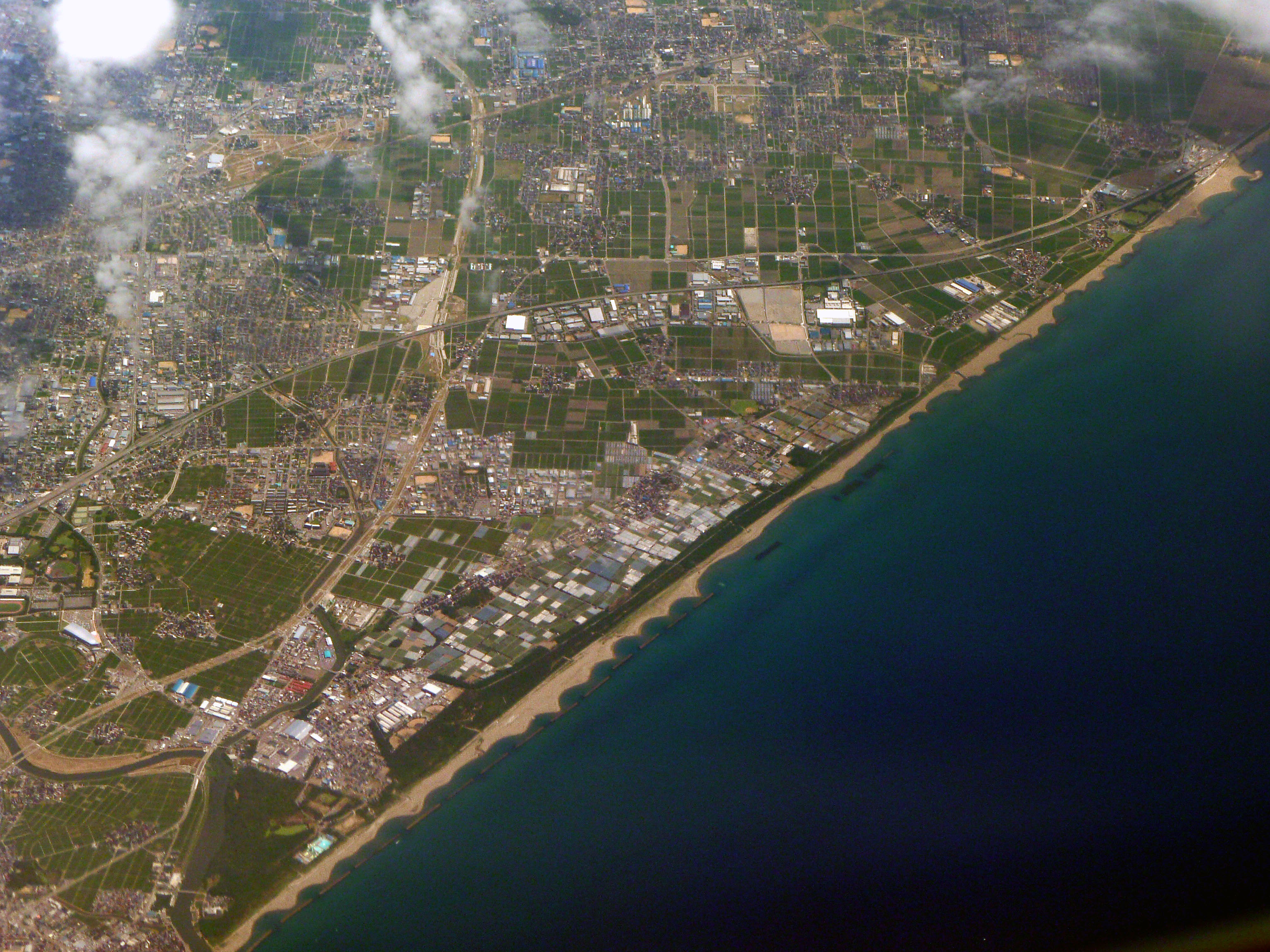
Coastal area of Hakusan

Hakusan (白山市, Hakusan-shi) is a city located in Ishikawa Prefecture, Japan. As of 31 January 2018, the city had an estimated population of 113,375 in 43246 households, and a population density of 290 persons per km^{2}. The total area of the city was 754.93 square kilometres (291.48 sq mi). It is the second-most populous city in Ishikawa Prefecture after Kanazawa.

== Geography ==
Hakusan is located in southwestern Ishikawa Prefecture in the Hokuriku region of Japan and is bordered by the Sea of Japan to the west and Fukui Prefecture to the south, and Gifu Prefecture and Toyama Prefectures to the east. The southeastern portion of the city is dominated by high mountains. Parts of the city are within the borders of Hakusan National Park.

=== Neighbouring municipalities ===
- Fukui Prefecture
  - Katsuyama
  - Ōno
- Gifu Prefecture
  - Shirakawa (village)
  - Takayama
- Ishikawa Prefecture
  - Kanazawa
  - Kawakita
  - Komatsu
  - Nomi
  - Nonoichi
- Toyama Prefecture
  - Nanto

=== Climate ===
Hakusan has a humid subtropical climate (Köppen Cfa) characterized by mild summers and cold winters with heavy snowfall. The average annual temperature in Hakusan is 14.2 °C. The average annual rainfall is 2542 mm with September as the wettest month. The temperatures are highest on average in August, at around 26.8 °C, and lowest in January, at around 2.9 °C.

Climate data for Hakusan (1991−2020 normals, extremes 1978−present)
| Month | Jan | Feb | Mar | Apr | May | Jun | Jul | Aug | Sep | Oct | Nov | Dec | Year |
|---|---|---|---|---|---|---|---|---|---|---|---|---|---|
| Record high °C (°F) | 17.9 (64.2) | 19.6 (67.3) | 25.7 (78.3) | 29.6 (85.3) | 32.2 (90.0) | 34.3 (93.7) | 37.3 (99.1) | 37.4 (99.3) | 35.5 (95.9) | 31.7 (89.1) | 26.8 (80.2) | 23.9 (75.0) | 37.4 (99.3) |
| Mean daily maximum °C (°F) | 5.0 (41.0) | 5.9 (42.6) | 10.4 (50.7) | 17.0 (62.6) | 22.2 (72.0) | 25.0 (77.0) | 28.8 (83.8) | 30.5 (86.9) | 26.2 (79.2) | 20.6 (69.1) | 14.7 (58.5) | 8.2 (46.8) | 17.9 (64.2) |
| Daily mean °C (°F) | 1.5 (34.7) | 1.8 (35.2) | 5.1 (41.2) | 11.3 (52.3) | 16.6 (61.9) | 20.2 (68.4) | 24.1 (75.4) | 25.2 (77.4) | 21.1 (70.0) | 15.3 (59.5) | 9.7 (49.5) | 4.3 (39.7) | 13.0 (55.4) |
| Mean daily minimum °C (°F) | −1.3 (29.7) | −1.6 (29.1) | 0.8 (33.4) | 5.9 (42.6) | 11.4 (52.5) | 16.2 (61.2) | 20.5 (68.9) | 21.2 (70.2) | 17.2 (63.0) | 11.2 (52.2) | 5.6 (42.1) | 1.2 (34.2) | 9.0 (48.3) |
| Record low °C (°F) | −10.0 (14.0) | −8.4 (16.9) | −6.3 (20.7) | −2.9 (26.8) | 1.5 (34.7) | 7.5 (45.5) | 13.6 (56.5) | 13.7 (56.7) | 7.8 (46.0) | 1.7 (35.1) | −1.4 (29.5) | −8.7 (16.3) | −10.0 (14.0) |
| Average precipitation mm (inches) | 340.5 (13.41) | 210.2 (8.28) | 195.6 (7.70) | 167.7 (6.60) | 162.2 (6.39) | 208.7 (8.22) | 290.8 (11.45) | 224.4 (8.83) | 235.6 (9.28) | 215.8 (8.50) | 277.9 (10.94) | 372.1 (14.65) | 2,901.4 (114.23) |
| Average snowfall cm (inches) | 217 (85) | 155 (61) | 56 (22) | 2 (0.8) | 0 (0) | 0 (0) | 0 (0) | 0 (0) | 0 (0) | 0 (0) | 1 (0.4) | 89 (35) | 518 (204) |
| Average precipitation days (≥ 1.0 mm) | 23.5 | 19.2 | 16.8 | 13.2 | 12.1 | 12.5 | 14.7 | 11.2 | 13.6 | 13.5 | 17.2 | 22.5 | 190 |
| Average snowy days (≥ 3 cm) | 17.8 | 14.9 | 6.8 | 0.3 | 0 | 0 | 0 | 0 | 0 | 0 | 0.1 | 8.0 | 47.9 |
| Mean monthly sunshine hours | 51.2 | 74.6 | 120.9 | 175.0 | 196.9 | 139.0 | 139.8 | 186.1 | 138.6 | 137.5 | 99.5 | 56.3 | 1,515.4 |
Source: Japan Meteorological Agency

== Demographics ==
Per Japanese census data, the population of Hakusan has recently plateaued after decades of strong growth.

Historical population
| Year | Pop. | ±% |
|---|---|---|
| 1970 | 65,725 | — |
| 1980 | 81,286 | +23.7% |
| 1990 | 98,499 | +21.2% |
| 2000 | 106,977 | +8.6% |
| 2010 | 110,459 | +3.3% |
| 2020 | 110,408 | −0.0% |

== History ==
The area around Hakusan was part of ancient Kaga Province. The area became part Kaga Domain under the Edo period Tokugawa shogunate. Following the Meiji restoration, the area was organised into Ishikawa District, Ishikawa. The town of Mattō was established with the creation of the modern municipalities system on April 1, 1889. It became a city on October 10, 1970. On February 1, 2005, Mattō merged with the towns of Mikawa and Tsurugi, and the villages of Kawachi, Oguchi, Shiramine, Torigoe and Yoshinodani (all from Ishikawa District) to form the city of Hakusan.

== Government ==
Hakusan has a mayor-council form of government with a directly elected mayor and a unicameral city legislature of 21 members.

== Economy ==
Eizo and its subsidiary, Irem, have their headquarters in Hakusan.

== Education ==
・International College of Technology, Kanazawa, a private technical college located in Hakusan foothills.

Hakusan has 19 public elementary schools and ten middle schools operated by the city government, and three public high schools operated by the Ishikawa Prefectural Board of Education and one by the city government. There is also one private high school. Kinjo College, a private junior college is also located in Hakusan.

== Transportation ==
=== Railway ===
Effective 16 March 2024, JR West no longer operates in Hakusan as its operations on the Hokuriku Main Line have since been transferred to the IR Ishikawa Railway.

IR Ishikawa Railway

- Komaiko - Mikawa - Kaga-Kasama - Nishi-Mattō - Mattō

Hokuriku Railroad - Ishikawa Line

- Hibari - Sodani - Dōhōji - Inokuchi - Oyanagi - Hinomiko - Tsurugi

=== Highway ===
- Hokuriku Expressway

National Route 8
National Route 157
National Route 305
National Route 360

== Sister cities ==
- Beaugency, Loiret, France
- Boston, Lincolnshire, United Kingdom
- Columbia, Missouri, United States
- Fujieda, Shizuoka, Japan
- Liyang, Jiangsu, China
- Penrith, New South Wales, Australia
- Raunheim, Hesse, Germany

== Local attractions ==
- Ishikawa Forest Experiment Station
- Hakusan, the "White Mountain" from which the merged city took its name.
- Hakusan National Park
- Matto Stadium is home to the city's major football club, FC Hokuriku (formerly Fervorosa Ishikawa, Fervorosa Hakusan and FC Goals) which competes in the Hokushinetsu Regional League.
- Tedori River
- Torigoe Castle ruins, a National Historic Site
