= Tatsuruhama =

Dissolved municipality in Ishikawa prefecture, Japan

Tatsuruhama (田鶴浜町, Tatsuruhama-machi) was a town located in Kashima District, Ishikawa Prefecture, Japan.

As of 2003, the town had an estimated population of 5,812 and a density of 204.65 persons per km^{2}. The total area was 28.40 km^{2}.

On October 1, 2004, Tatsuruhama, along with the towns of Nakajima and Notojima (all from Kashima District), was merged into the expanded city of Nanao and no longer exists as an independent municipality.

Since 1992, Tatsuruhama's sister city was Morgantown, Kentucky, United States of America.

== Tatsuruhama Bird Park ==
The bird park opened in 1997 and was introduced as a natural habitat for birds in the area to improve conservation. Around 2000 trees were planted in an area of approximately 1.8 hectares.

== Tatsuruhama High School ==
Tatsuruhama High School has specialised Nursing and Welfare courses. Students who complete 3rd year high school (12th year of schooling) can go on to either further study in Welfare training colleges, or continue through the school's own speciality training course (専攻) at Noto General Hospital (能登総合病院) for a further two years to become a fully qualified nurse. There is an onsite dormitory for 50 students, and the school used to be a girls-only school, but has recently opened its doors to male students also (the school's population of male students remains fairly low).
