= Toriya, Ishikawa =

Dissolved municipality in Kashima district, Ishikawa prefecture, Japan

Toriya (鳥屋町, Toriya-machi) was a town located in Kashima District, Ishikawa Prefecture, Japan.

In 2003, the town had an estimated population of 5,576 and a population density of 206.52 per km^{2}. The total area was 27.00 km^{2}.

On March 1, 2005, Toriya, along with the towns of Kashima and Rokusei (all from Kashima District), was merged to create the town of Nakanoto.

== History ==
April 1, 1889 - Toriya-mura, Kashima-gun was established as a result of the town/village system.

November 3, 1939 - Toriya-mura, Kashima-gun was abolished and Toriya-cho, Kashima-gun was established with its area.

March 31, 1954 - Aza-Seto and Aza-Hanamizuki in Soma-mura, Kashima-gun were incorporated into Toriya-cho, Kashima-gun.

March 1, 2005 - Toriya-cho, Kashima-cho, and Kanzai-cho, Kashima-gun were abolished, and Nakanoto-cho, Kashima-gun was established with their areas.
