= Mattō, Ishikawa =

Dissolved municipality in Ishikawa prefecture, Japan

Mattō (松任市, Mattō-shi) was a city in Ishikawa Prefecture, Japan.

In 2003, the city had an estimated population of 66,520 and a population density of 1,109.96 persons per km^{2}. The total area was 59.93 km^{2}.

The city was founded in 1970. On February 1, 2005, Mattō, along with the towns of Mikawa and Tsurugi, and the villages of Kawachi, Oguchi, Shiramine, Torigoe and Yoshinodani (all from Ishikawa District), was merged to create the city of Hakusan, and no longer exists as an independent municipality.
