= Nakajima, Ishikawa =

Dissolved municipality in Ishikawa prefecture, Japan

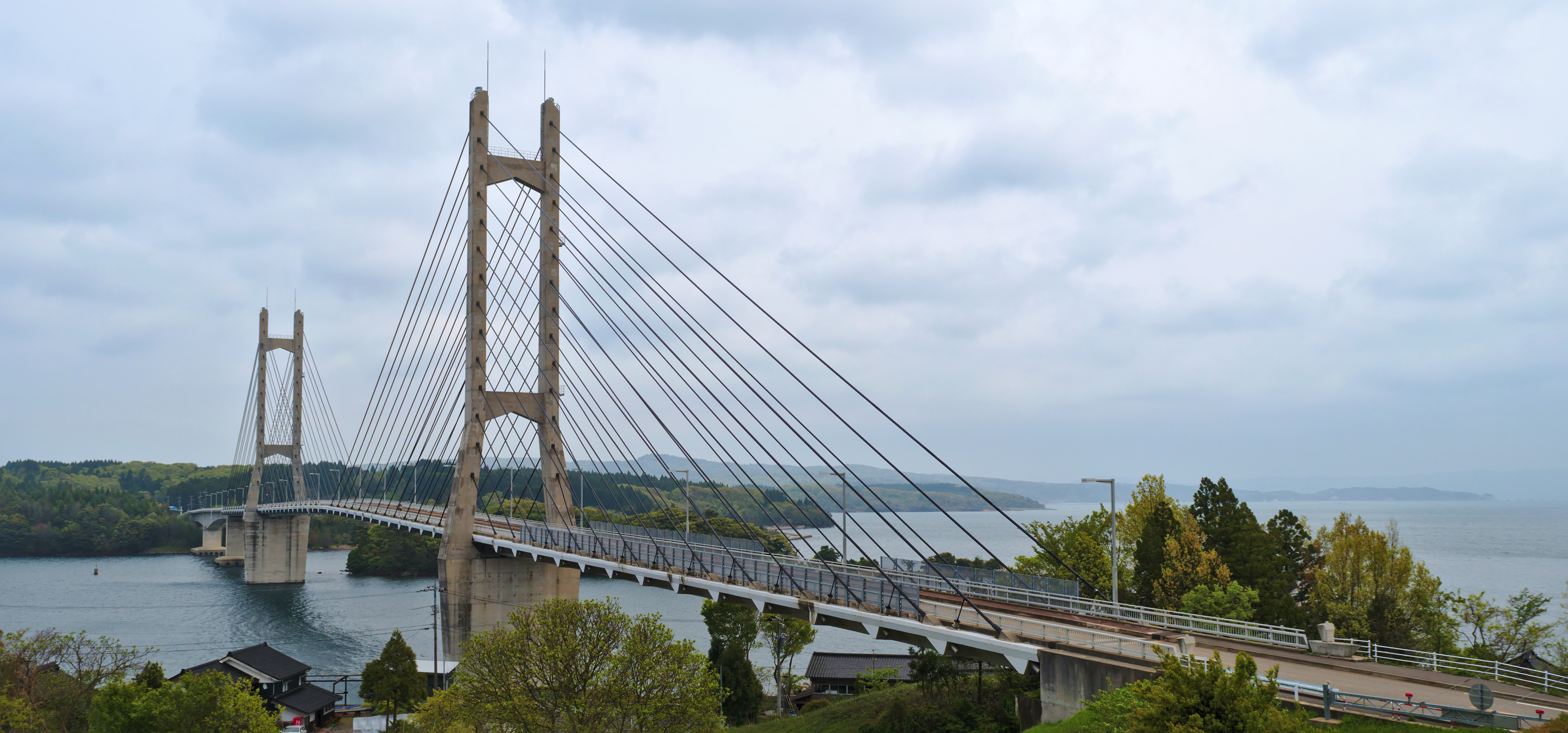
Nakajima is connected to Noto island by the Nakanoto Agricultural Bridge.

Nakajima (中島町, Nakajima-machi) was a town located in Kashima District, Ishikawa Prefecture, Japan.

As of 2003, the town had an estimated population of 6,952 and a density of 70.40 persons per km^{2}. The total area was 98.75 km^{2}.

On October 1, 2004, Nakajima, along with the towns of Notojima and Tatsuruhama (all from Kashima District), was merged into the expanded city of Nanao and no longer exists as an independent municipality.
