= Oshimizu, Ishikawa =

Dissolved municipality in Ishikawa prefecture, Japan

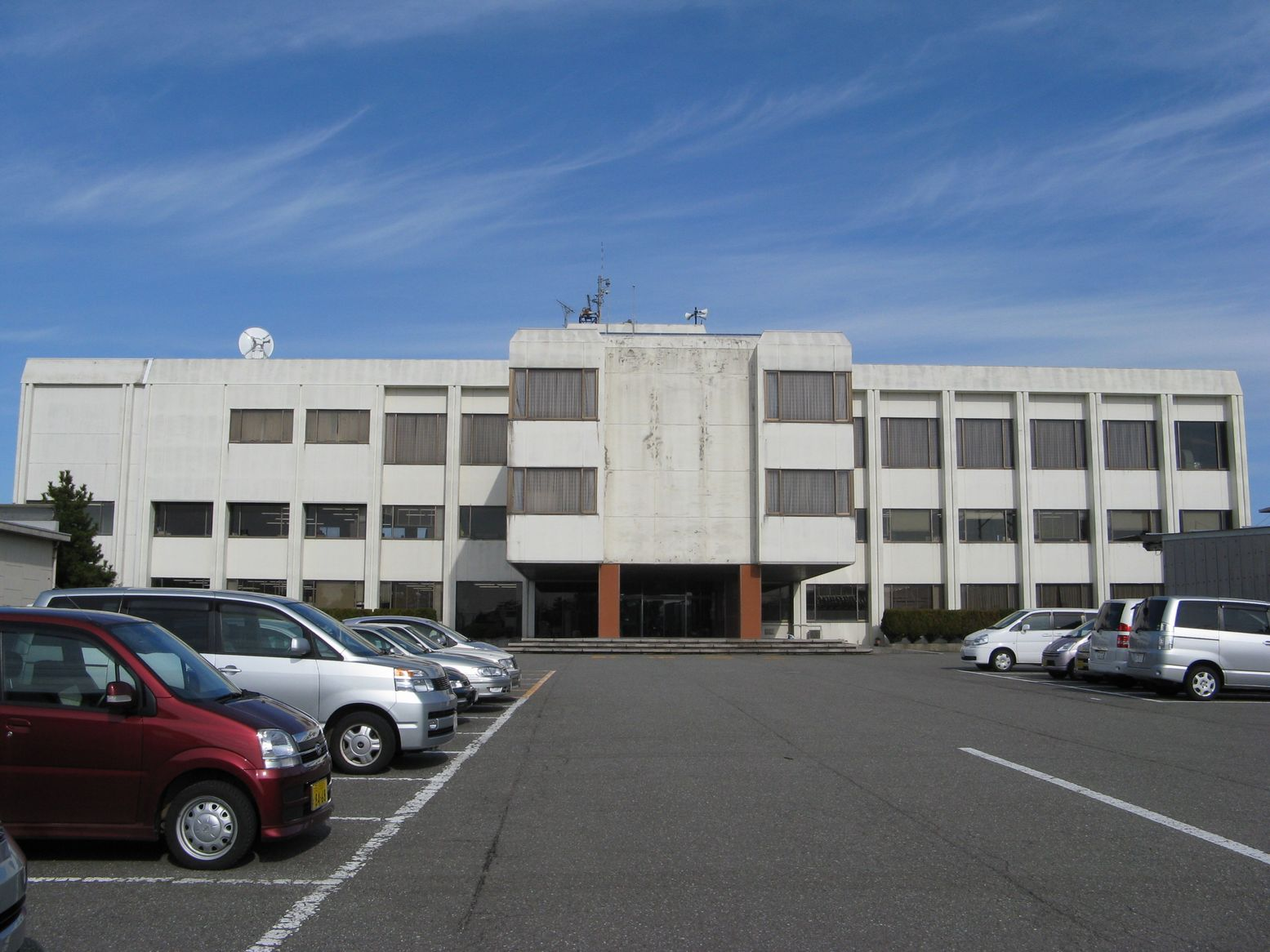
former Oshimizu Town Hall

Oshimizu (押水町, Oshimizu-machi) was a town located in Hakui District, Ishikawa Prefecture, Japan. As of 2003, the town had an estimated population of 8,429 and a density of 157.79 persons per km^{2}. The total area was 53.42 km^{2}.

On March 1, 2005, Oshimizu, along with the town of Shio (also from Hakui District), was merged to create the town of Hōdatsushimizu and no longer exists as an independent municipality.
