= Kashima, Ishikawa =

Dissolved municipality in Kashima district, Ishikawa prefecture, Japan

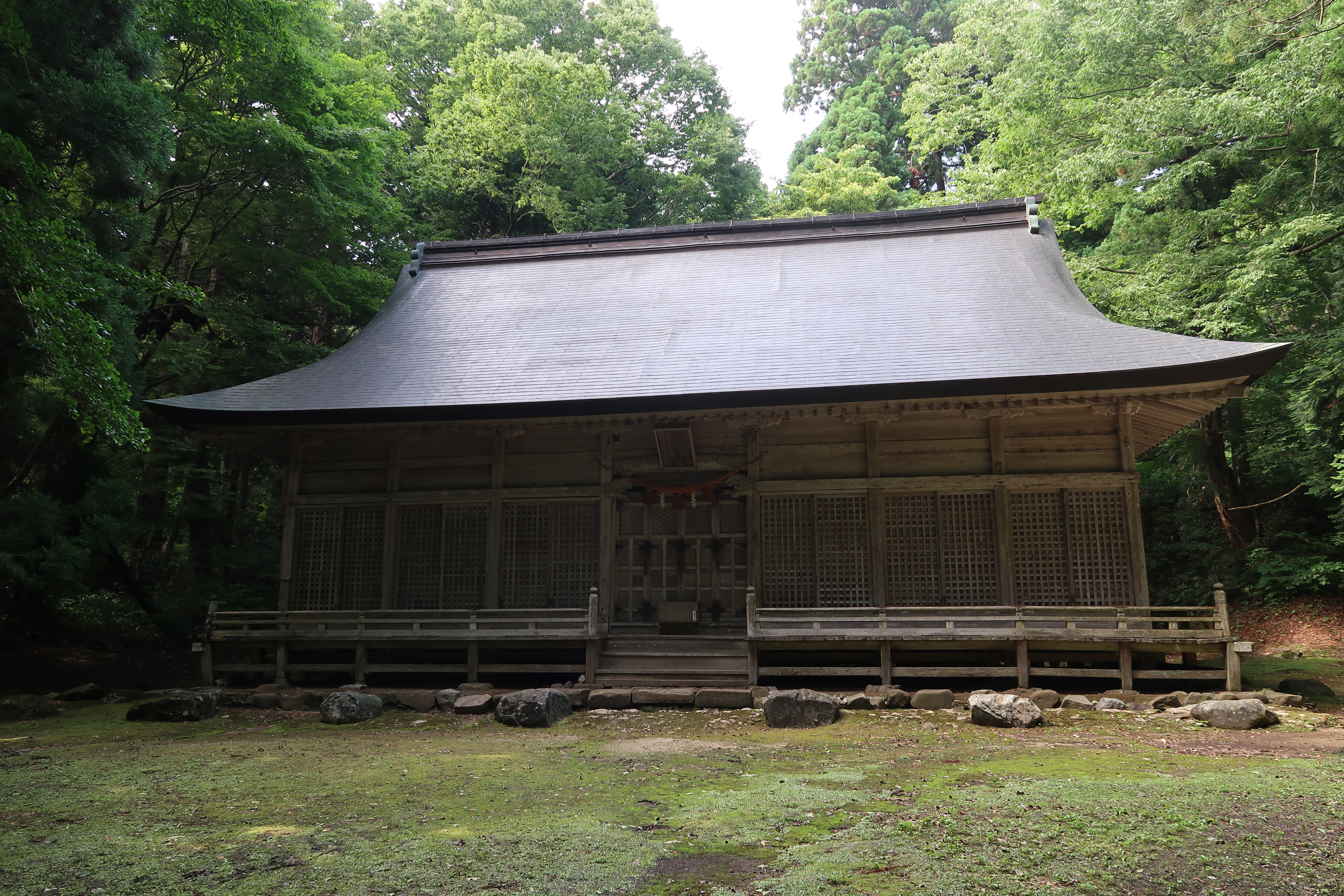
Isu-ryu Kihiko Shrine

Kashima (鹿島町, Kashima-machi) was a town located in Kashima District, Ishikawa Prefecture, Japan. On March 1, 2005, Kashima was merged with the towns of Rokusei and Toriya (all from Kashima District) to create the town of Nakanoto. As of 2003, the town had an estimated population of 8,515, a density of 178.96 persons per km^{2}, and a total area of 47.58 km^{2}.
