= Togi, Ishikawa =

- Former municipality
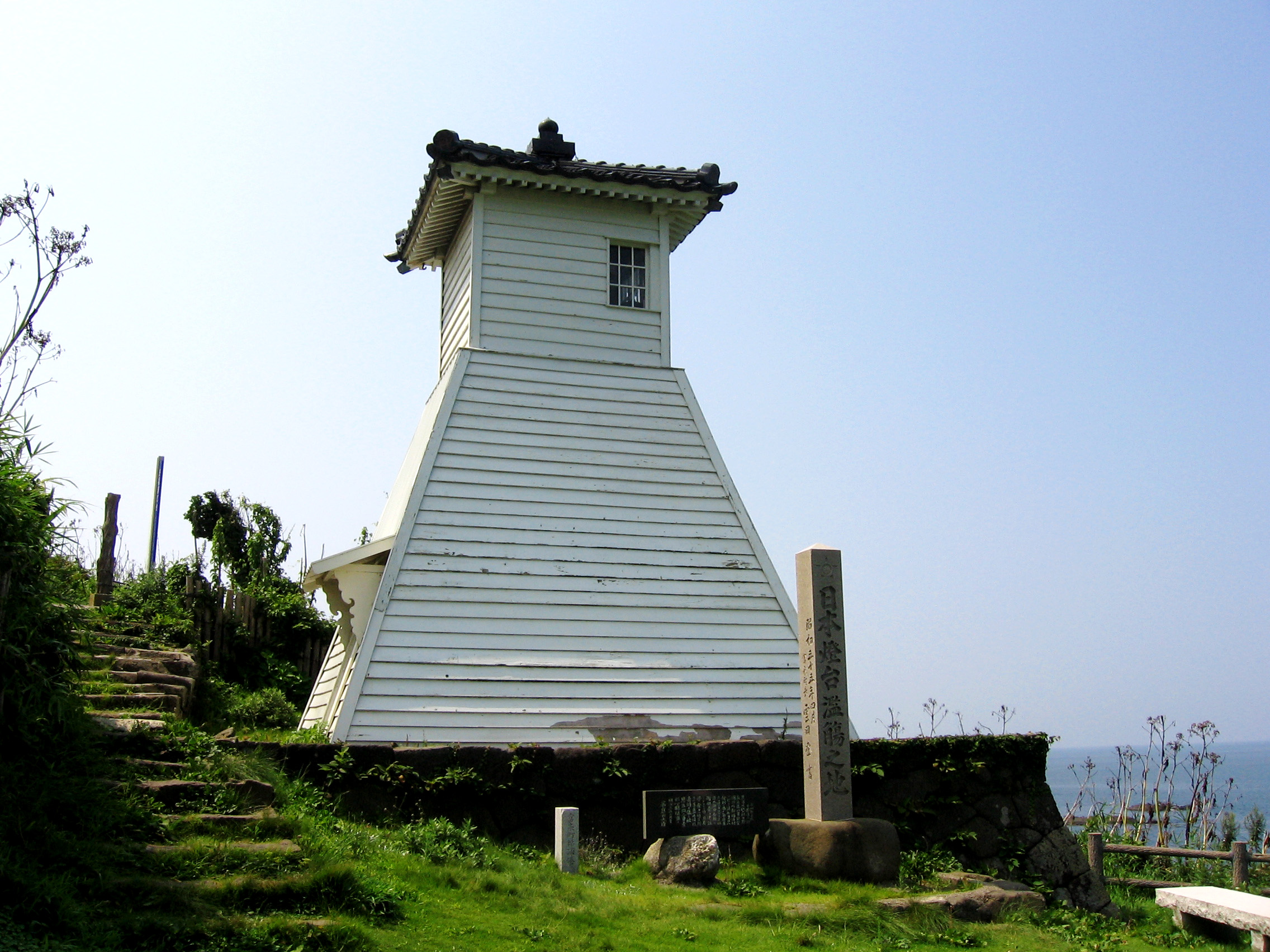
- A lighthouse in the town.

- Flag Seal
- Interactive map of Togi, Ishikawa

Togi (富来町, Togi-machi) was a town located in Hakui District, Ishikawa Prefecture, Japan.

As of 2003, the town had an estimated population of 8,985 and a density of 72.77 persons per km^{2}. The total area was 123.48 km^{2}.

On September 1, 2005, Togi was merged into the expanded town of Shika.
