= Rokusei, Ishikawa =

Dissolved municipality in Ishikawa prefecture, Japan

Rokusei (鹿西町, Rokusei-machi) was a town located in Kashima District, Ishikawa Prefecture, Japan.

As of 2003, the town had an estimated population of 4,868 and a density of 329.36 persons per km^{2}. The total area was 14.78 km^{2}.

On March 1, 2005, Rokusei, along with towns of Kashima and Toriya (all from Kashima District), was merged to create the town of Nakanoto.
