= Hakui District =

District in Ishikawa prefecture, Japan

Coordinates: 36°52′N 136°48′E

Hakui District in Ishikawa Prefecture.

Hakui (羽咋郡, Hakui-gun) is a district located in Ishikawa Prefecture, Japan.

As of 2003, the district has an estimated population of 39,888 with a density of 111.35 persons per km^{2}. The total area is 358.23 km^{2}.

== Municipalities ==
The district consists of two towns:

- Hōdatsushimizu (Note: Classified as a town.)
- Shika

== History ==
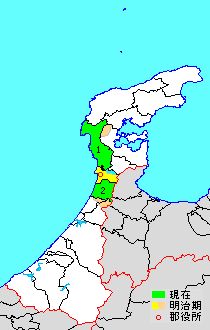
Map showing original extent of Hakui District in Ishikawa Prefecture: * yellow - areas formerly within the district borders during the early Meiji period: 1. Hōdatsushimizu-machi; 2. Shika-machi

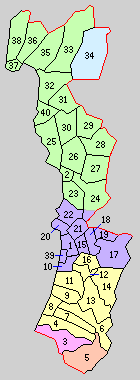
Colored areas are in this district.

=== Recent mergers ===
- On March 1, 2005 - The towns of Oshimizu and Shio were merged to form the town of Hōdatsushimizu.
- On September 1, 2005 - The town of Togi was merged into the expanded town of Shika.
