= Shio, Ishikawa =

Dissolved municipality in Ishikawa prefecture, Japan

Shio (志雄町, Shio-machi) was a town located in Hakui District, Ishikawa Prefecture, Japan.

As of 2003, the town had an estimated population of 7,112 and a density of 122.07 persons per km^{2}. The total area was 58.26 km^{2}.

On March 1, 2005, Shio, along with the town of Oshimizu (also from Hakui District), was merged to create the town of Hōdatsushimizu and no longer exists as an independent municipality.
