= Ishikawa District, Ishikawa =

Former district in Ishikawa prefecture, Japan

Coordinates: 36°32′24″N 136°36′36″E

Ishikawa (石川郡, Ishikawa-gun) was a district located in Ishikawa Prefecture, Japan.

As of February 2011, the district had an estimated population of 51,976 with a density of 3,830 persons per km^{2}. The total area was 13.56 km^{2}.

== Municipalities ==
Prior to its dissolution, the district consisted of only one town:

- Nonoichi (Note: Classified as a town.)

== History ==
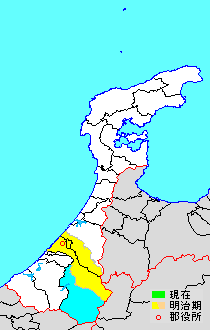
Map showing original extent of Ishikawa District in Ishikawa Prefecture: * yellow - areas formerly within the district borders during the early Meiji period}

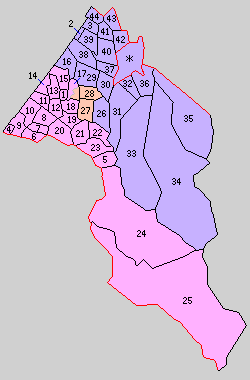
Colored areas are in this district.

=== Recent mergers ===
- On February 1, 2005 - The towns of Mikawa and Tsurugi, and the villages of Kawachi, Oguchi, Shiramine, Torigoe and Yoshinodani were merged with the city of Mattō to form the city of Hakusan.
- On November 11, 2011 - The town of Nonoichi was elevated to city status to become the city of Nonoichi. Therefore, Ishikawa District was dissolved as a result of this merger.

== See also ==
- List of dissolved districts of Japan
