= Tatsuruhama Station =

Railway station in Nanao, Ishikawa Prefecture, Japan

Tatsuruhama Station 田鶴浜駅
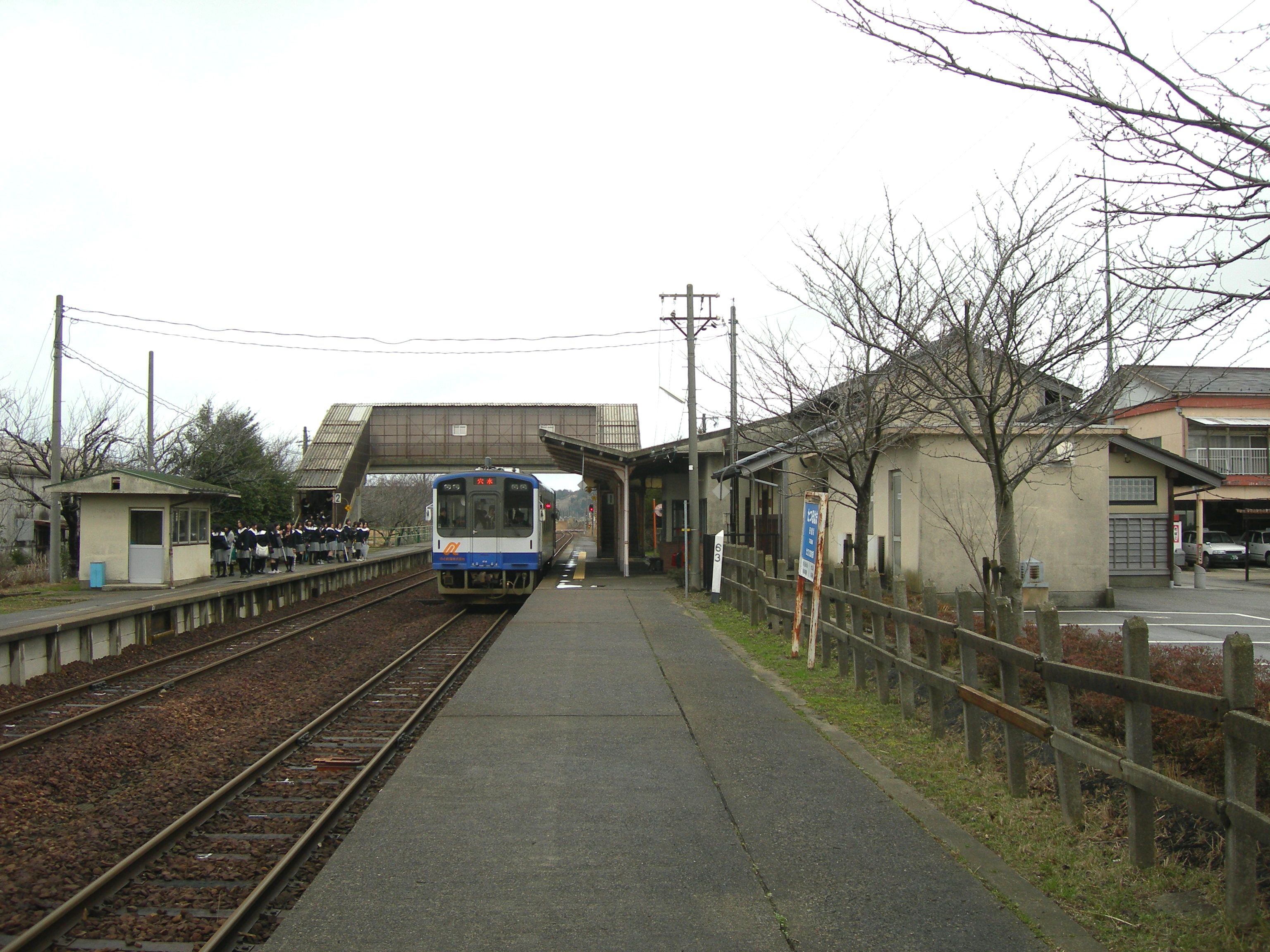
- Tatsuruhama Station platforms in March 2010

General information
- Location: 13 Tatsuruhama, Nanao City, Ishikawa Prefecture 929-2121; Japan
- Coordinates: 37.0658°N 136.8913°E
- Operator: Noto Railway
- Line: Nanao Line
- Distance: 8.6 km (5.3 mi) from Nanao
- Platforms: 2 side platforms
- Tracks: 2

Construction
- Structure type: At grade

Other information
- Status: Staffed
- Website: Official website

History
- Opened: 31 October 1928; 97 years ago

Passengers
- FY2019: 197 daily

Services
Preceding station	Noto Railway	Following station
Wakuraonsen towards Nanao	Nanao Line	Kasashiho towards Anamizu
Location
- Location within Ishikawa Prefecture Location within Chubu region Location within Japan

Tatsuruhama Station (田鶴浜駅, Tatsuruhama-eki) is a railway station on the Nanao Line in the city of Nanao, Ishikawa, Japan, operated by the private railway operator Noto Railway.

== Lines ==
Tatsuruhama Station is served by the Noto Railway Nanao Line between Nanao and Anamizu, and is 8.6 km from the starting point of the line at Nanao.

== Station layout ==
The station consists of two opposed side platforms connected by a footbridge. The station is staffed.

=== Platforms ===
1	■ Noto Railway Nanao Line	for Anamizu for Nanao and Kanazawa
2	■ Noto Railway Nanao Line	for Nanao and Anamizu (peak use only)

== History ==
Tatsuruhama Station opened on 31 October 1928. With the privatization of Japanese National Railways (JNR) on 1 April 1987, the station came under the control of JR West. On 1 September 1991, the section of the Nanao Line from Nanao to Anamizu was separated from JR West into the Noto Railway.

== Passenger statistics ==
In fiscal 2015, the station was used by an average of 210 passengers daily (boarding passengers only).

== Surrounding area ==
- National Route 249
- Former Tsuruhama Town Hall
- Tsuruhama Post Office

== See also ==
- List of railway stations in Japan
