= Nanao =

Nanao may refer to:

== Places ==
- Nanao, Ishikawa (七尾市), Japan
  - Nanao Line a rail line through Nanao, Ishikawa
  - Nanao Station a station on the Nanao Line
- Nan'ao County (南澳县), Shantou, Guangdong
  - Nan'ao Island (南澳岛), forming most of Nan'ao County
- Nan'ao Subdistrict (南澳街道), a subdistrict of Shenzhen, Guangdong
- Nan-ao, Yilan (南澳鄉), a township in Yilan County, Taiwan

== People ==
- Nanao Arai (荒井 菜々緒; born 1988), Japanese actress and model
- Nanao Sakaki (ななお さかき; 1923–2008), Japanese poet
- Nanao Singh Thokchom (born 1991), Indian boxer
- Haruhi Nanao (七緒 はるひ; born 1973), Japanese voice actress
- Naru Nanao (七尾 奈留), Japanese artist
- Tavito Nanao (七尾 旅人; born 1979), Japanese singer-songwriter who debuted in 1998

== Characters ==
- Nanao Ise, a character in the Bleach series
- Nanao Hibiya, a character in Reign of the Seven Spellblades.
- Nanao Kisaragi, a character in the light novel series Tsurune.

== Other ==
- The Eizo Nanao Corporation, a manufacturer of high-quality computer displays
