= Noto-Nakajima Station =

Railway station in Nanao, Ishikawa Prefecture, Japan

Noto-Nakajima Station 能登中島駅
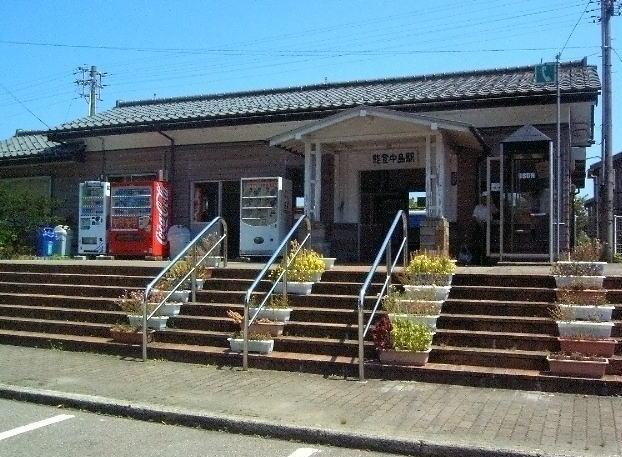
- Noto-Nakajima Station in August 2008

General information
- Location: Hamada, Nakajima-machi, Nanao City, Ishikawa Prefecture 929-2241; Japan
- Coordinates: 37°6′33″N 136°51′12″E
- Operator: Noto Railway
- Line: Nanao Line
- Distance: 16.3 km (10.1 mi) from Nanao
- Platforms: 1 side + 1 island platform
- Tracks: 3

Construction
- Structure type: At grade

Other information
- Status: Staffed
- Website: Official website

History
- Opened: 31 October 1928; 97 years ago

Passengers
- FY2019: 115 daily

Services
Preceding station	Noto Railway	Following station
Kasashiho towards Nanao	Nanao Line	Nishigishi towards Anamizu
Location
- Location within Ishikawa Prefecture Location within Chubu region Location within Japan

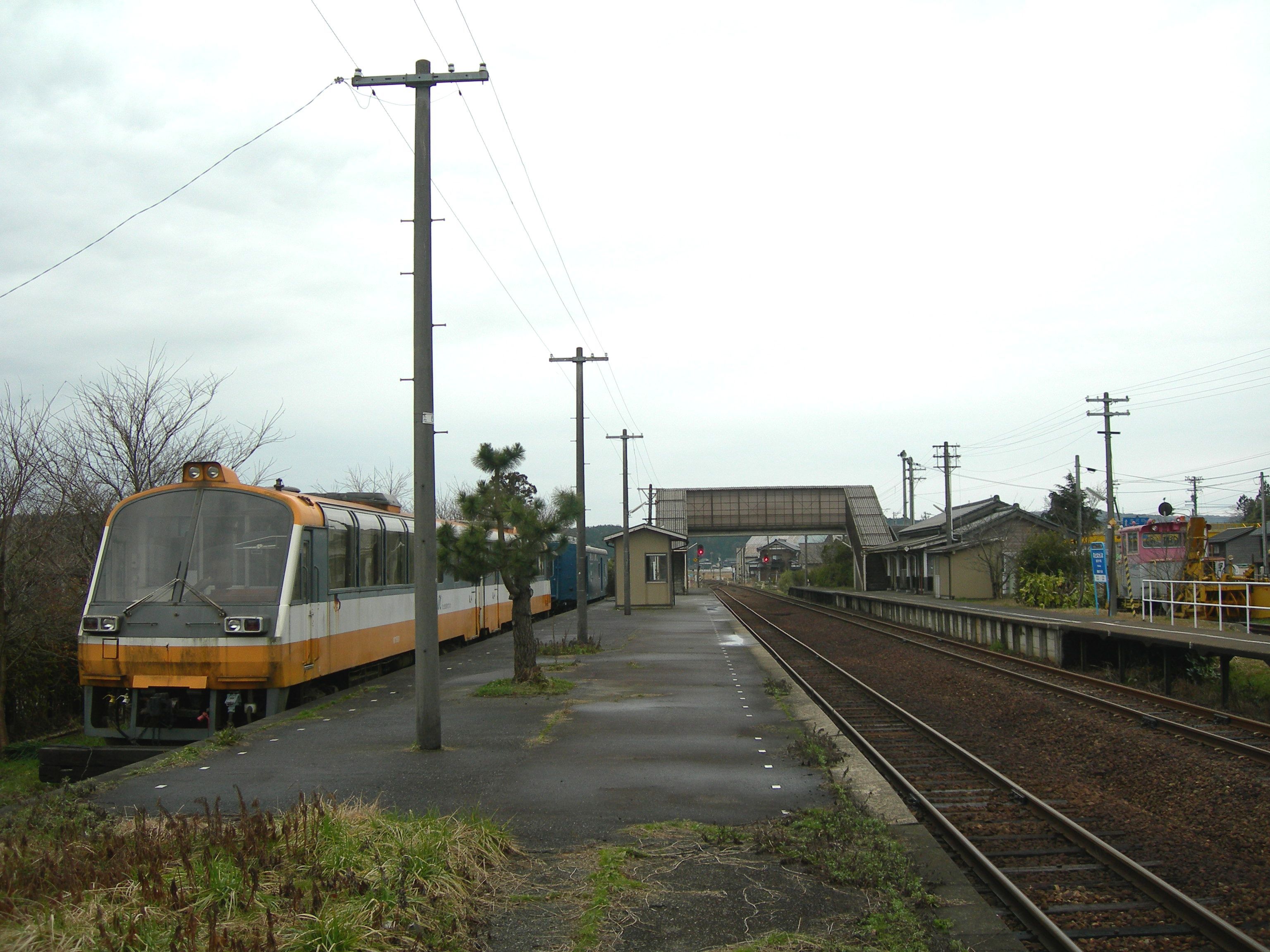
Platforms, March 2010

Noto-Nakajima Station (能登中島駅, Noto-Nakajima-eki) is a railway station on the Nanao Line in the city of Nanao, Ishikawa, Japan, operated by the private railway operator Noto Railway.

== Lines ==
Noto-Nakajima Station is served by the Noto Railway Nanao Line between Nanao and Anamizu, and is 16.3 km from the starting point of the line at Nanao.

== Station layout ==
The station consists of one ground-level side platform and one ground-level island platform connected by a footbridge. The station is staffed.

=== Platforms ===
1	■ Noto Railway Nanao Line	for Anamizu
2	■ Noto Railway Nanao Line	for Nanao and Kanazawa
3	■ Noto Railway Nanao Line	(not in normal use)

== History ==
Noto-Nakajima Station opened on 31 October 1928. With the privatization of Japanese National Railways (JNR) on 1 April 1987, the station came under the control of JR West. On 1 September 1991, the section of the Nanao Line from Nanao to Anamizu was separated from JR West into the Noto Railway.

== Passenger statistics ==
In fiscal 2015, the station was used by an average of 145 passengers daily (boarding passengers only).

== Surrounding area ==
- National Route 249
- former Nakajima Town Hall

== See also ==
- List of railway stations in Japan
