= Kasashiho Station =

Railway station in Nanao, Ishikawa Prefecture, Japan

Kasashiho Station 笠師保駅
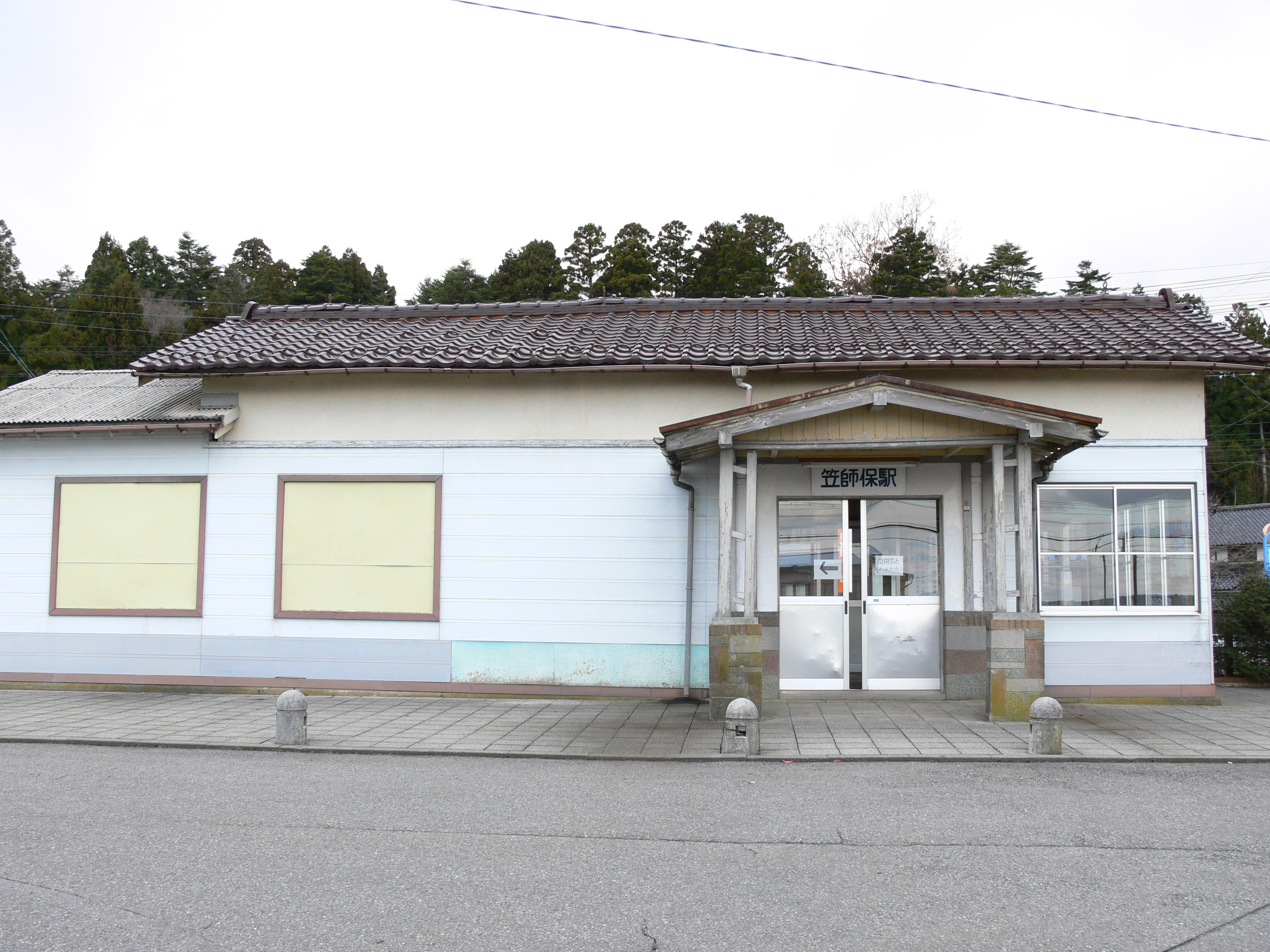
- Kasashiho Station in March 2009

General information
- Location: Shiotsu, Nakajima-machi, Nanao City, Ishikawa Prefecture 929-2234; Japan
- Coordinates: 37°4′45″N 136°51′27″E
- Operator: Noto Railway
- Line: Nanao Line
- Distance: 12.7 km (7.9 mi) from Nanao
- Platforms: 1 side platform
- Tracks: 1

Construction
- Structure type: At grade

Other information
- Status: Unstaffed
- Website: Official website

History
- Opened: 31 October 1928; 97 years ago

Passengers
- 2019: 30 daily

Services
Preceding station	Noto Railway	Following station
Tatsuruhama towards Nanao	Nanao Line	Noto-Nakajima towards Anamizu
Route map
Location
- Location within Ishikawa Prefecture Location within Chubu region Location within Japan

Kasashiho Station (笠師保駅, Kasashiho-eki) is a railway station on the Nanao Line in the city of Nanao, Ishikawa, Japan, operated by the private railway operator Noto Railway.

== Lines ==
Kasashiho Station is served by the Noto Railway Nanao Line between Nanao and Anamizu, and is 12.7 km from the starting point of the line at Nanao.

== Station layout ==
The station consists of one ground-level side platform serving a single bi-directional track. The station is unattended.

== History ==
Kasashiho Station opened on 31 October 1928. With the privatization of Japanese National Railways (JNR) on 1 April 1987, the station came under the control of JR West. On 1 September 1991, the section of the Nanao Line from Nanao to Anamizu was separated from JR West into the Noto Railway.

== Surrounding area ==
- Kasashiho Post Office

== See also ==
- List of railway stations in Japan
