= Nishigishi Station =

Railway station in Nanao, Ishikawa Prefecture, Japan

Nishigishi Station 西岸駅
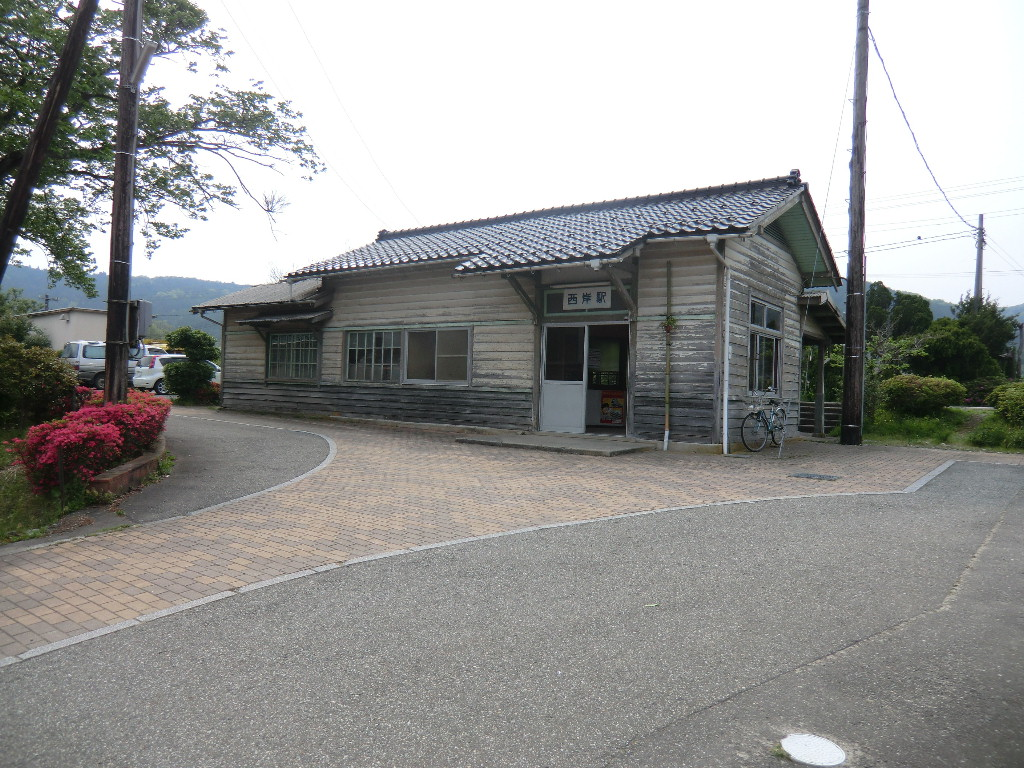
- Nishigishi Station in May 2011

General information
- Location: Soto, Nakajima-machi, Nanao City, Ishikawa Prefecture 929-2213; Japan
- Coordinates: 37°8′51″N 136°52′28″E
- Operator: Noto Railway
- Line: Nanao Line
- Distance: 22.5 km (14.0 mi) from Nanao
- Platforms: 2 side platforms
- Tracks: 2

Construction
- Structure type: At grade

Other information
- Status: Unstaffed
- Website: Official website

History
- Opened: 27 August 1932; 93 years ago

Passengers
- 2019: 24 (Daily)

Services
Preceding station	Noto Railway	Following station
Noto-Nakajima towards Nanao	Nanao Line	Noto-Kashima towards Anamizu
Location
- Location within Ishikawa Prefecture Location within Chubu region Location within Japan

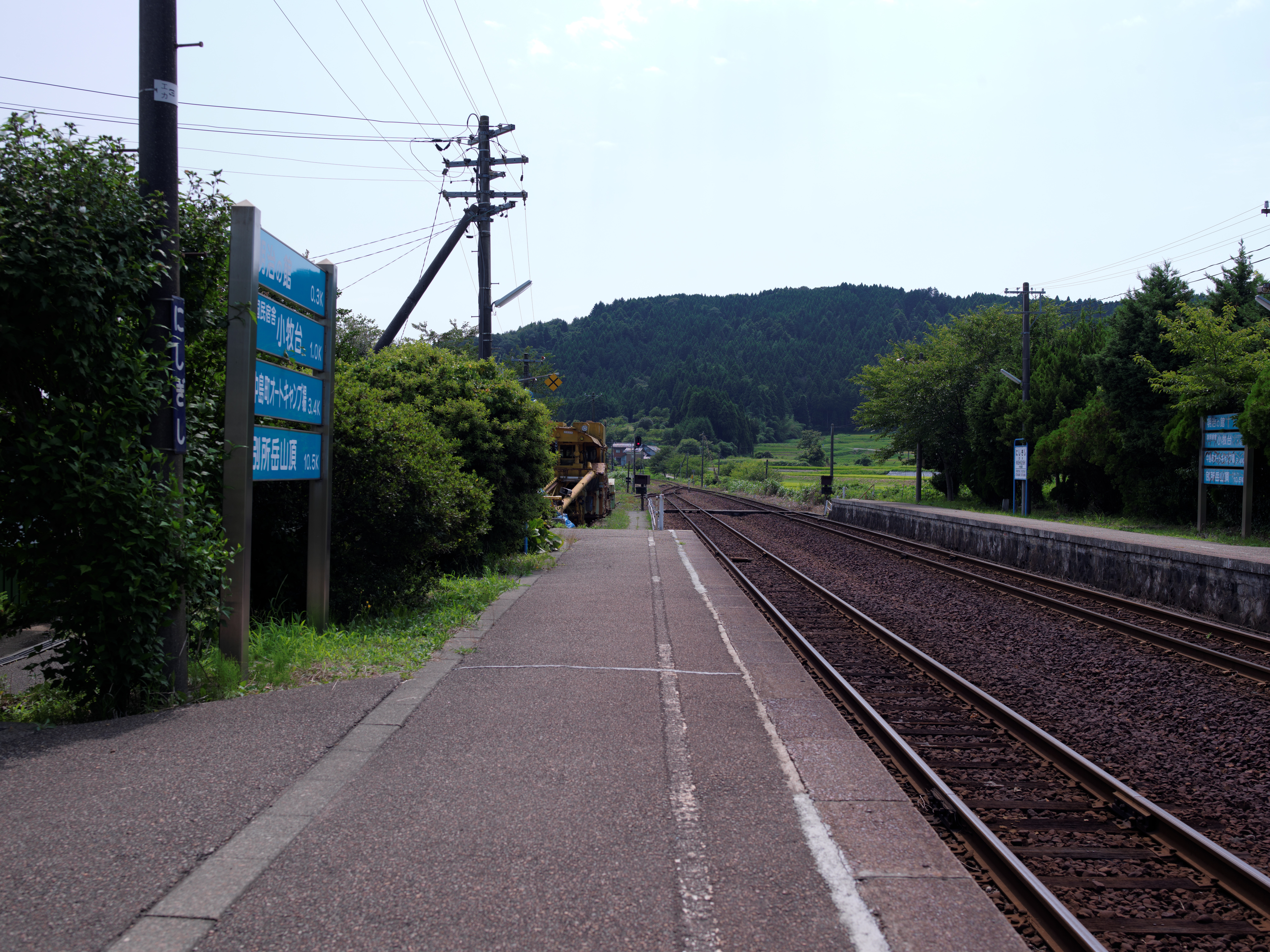
Platforms, August 2012

Nishigishi Station (Japanese: 西岸駅, Hepburn: Nishigishi-eki) is a railway station on the Nanao Line in the city of Nanao, Ishikawa, Japan. It is operated by the private railway operator Noto Railway.

== Lines ==
Nishigishi Station is served by the Noto Railway Nanao Line between Nanao and Anamizu, and is 22.5 km from the starting point of the line at Nanao.

== Station layout ==
The station consists of two opposed ground-level side platforms on a passing loop, connected by a level crossing. The station is unattended.

== History ==
Nishigishi Station opened on 27 August 1932. With the privatization of Japanese National Railways (JNR) on 1 April 1987, the station came under the control of JR West. On 1 September 1991, the section of the Nanao Line from Nanao to Anamizu was separated from JR West into the Noto Railway.

== Surrounding area ==
- National Route 249
- Nishigishi Post Office

== In fiction ==
Nishigishi Station served as inspiration for Yunosagi Station which features prominently in the 2011 anime Hanasaku Iroha. A symbolic Yunosagi station sign was unveiled on April 29, 2011.

== See also ==
- List of railway stations in Japan
