= Noto-Mii Station =

Former railway station in Wajima, Ishikawa prefecture, Japan

Coordinates: 37°18′54″N 136°54′5.4″E

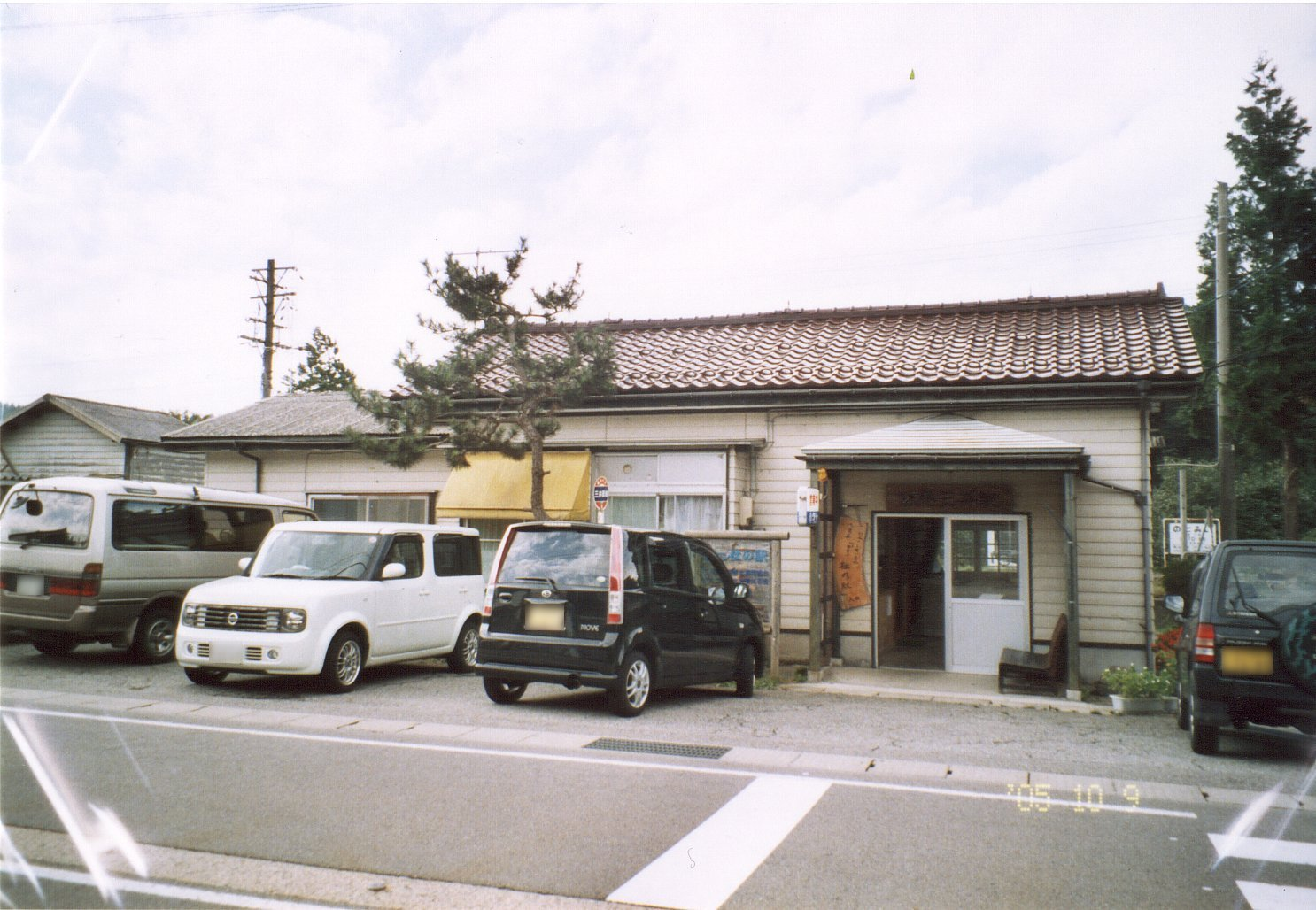
Former station building, October 2005

Noto-Mii Station (能登三井駅, Noto-Mii-eki) was a railway station located in Wajima, Ishikawa Prefecture, Japan. This station was abandoned in 2001.

== Line ==
- Noto Railway
  - Nanao Line

== Adjacent stations ==
«	Service	»
Noto Railway Nanao Line
Anamizu	-	Noto-Ichinose
