= Yoshikawa Station (Ishikawa) =

Railway station in Nakanoto, Ishikawa Prefecture, Japan

Yoshikawa Station 良川駅
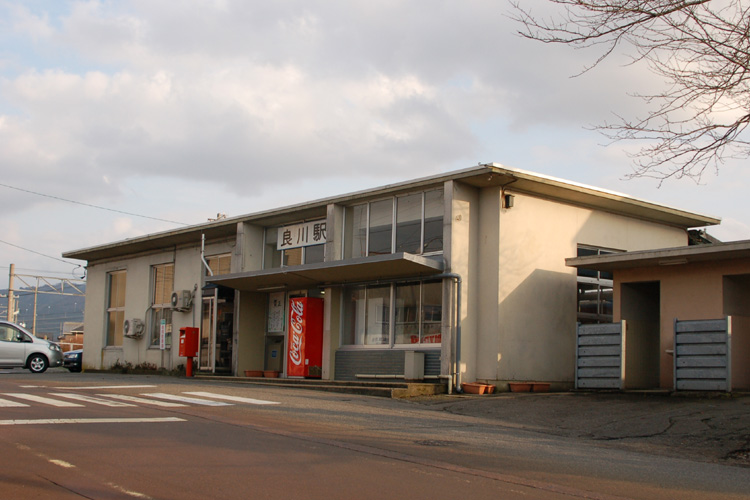
- Yoshikawa Station in January 2009

General information
- Location: 17-3-1 Yoshikawa, Nakanoto-machi, Kashima-gun, Ishikawa-ken 929-1717; Japan
- Coordinates: 36.9766°N 136.8948°E
- Operator: JR West
- Line: ■ Nanao Line
- Distance: 43.9 km from Tsubata
- Platforms: 2 side platforms
- Tracks: 2

Construction
- Structure type: At grade

Other information
- Status: Staffed
- Website: Official website

History
- Opened: 15 June 1901

Passengers
- FY2015: 306 daily
Location
- Location within Japan

Yoshikawa Station (良川駅, Yoshikawa-eki) is a railway station on the Nanao Line in Nakanoto, Kashima District, Ishikawa Prefecture, Japan, operated by the West Japan Railway Company (JR West).

== Lines ==
Yoshikawa Station is served by the Nanao Line, and is located 43.9 kilometers from the end of the line at Tsubata and 55.4 kilometers from Kanazawa.

== Station layout ==
The station consists of two opposed ground-level side platforms connected by a footbridge. The station is attended.

=== Platforms ===
1	■ Nanao Line	for Nanao
2	■ Nanao Line	for Tsubata and Kanazawa

== Adjacent stations ==
«	Service	»
Nanao Line
Notobe	-	Noto-Ninomiya

== History ==
The station opened on June 15, 1901. With the privatization of Japanese National Railways (JNR) on April 1, 1987, the station came under the control of JR West.

== Passenger statistics ==
In fiscal 2015, the station was used by an average of 306 passengers daily (boarding passengers only).

== Surrounding area ==
- National Route 159
- Yoshikawa Post Office

== See also ==
- List of railway stations in Japan
