= Wajima =

Wajima may refer to:

- Wajima, Ishikawa, a city in Japan
  - Wajima-nuri, a type of Japanese lacquerware from the same area
  - Wajima Station, a train station
- Wajima Hiroshi, Japanese sumo wrestler
- Wajima (horse), American Champion racehorse
- Koichi Wajima, Japanese professional boxer
- Tomoe Wajima, a fictional character in the anime/manga Hanasaku Iroha
