= Noto-Ichinose Station =

Abandoned railway station in Wajima, Ishikawa prefecture, Japan

Coordinates: 37°21′12″N 136°54′33.6″E

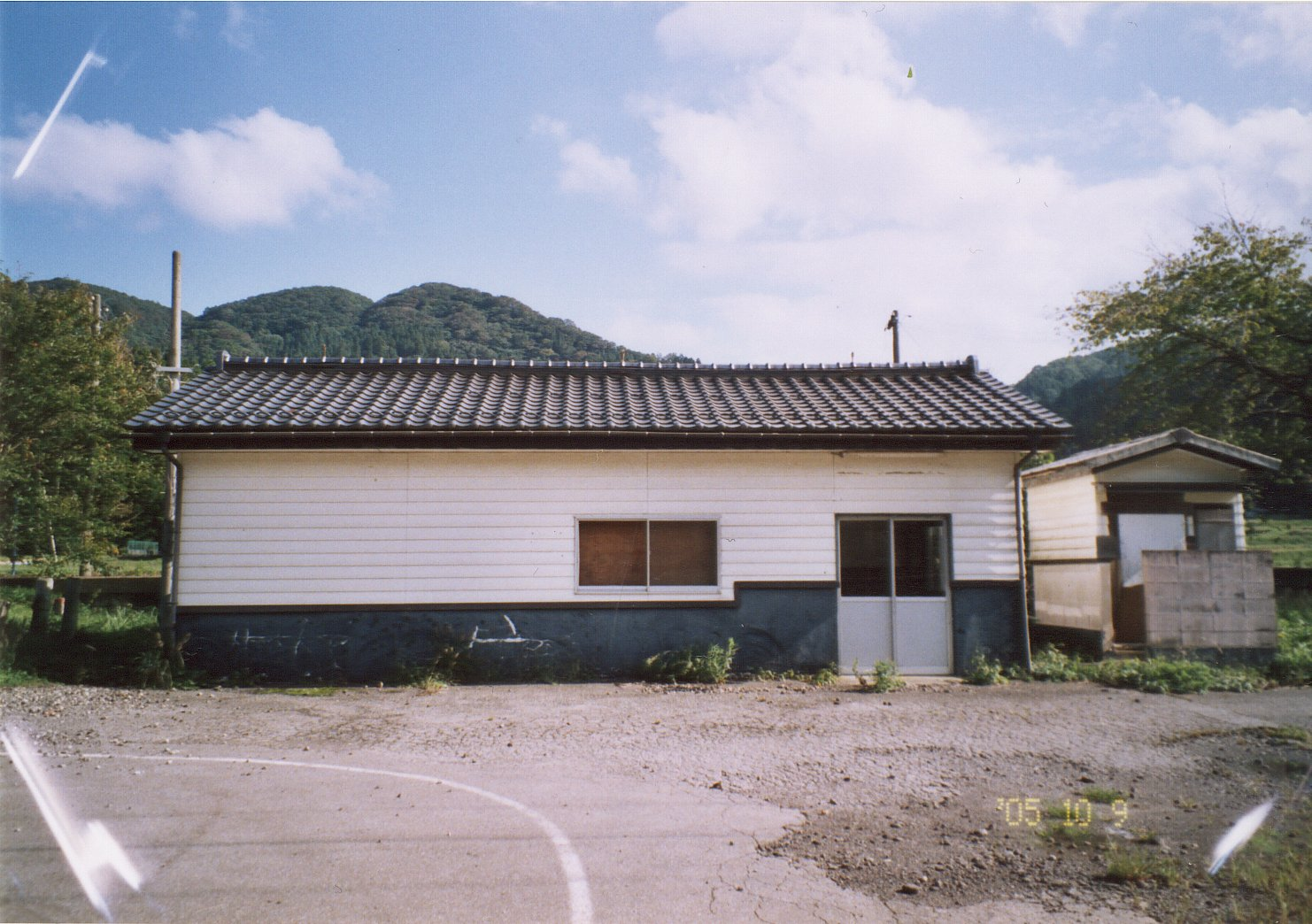
Former station building, October 2005

Noto-Ichinose Station (能登市ノ瀬駅, Noto-Ichinose-eki) was a railway station located in Wajima, Ishikawa Prefecture, Japan. This station was abandoned in 2001.

== Line ==
- Noto Railway
  - Nanao Line

== Adjacent stations ==
«	Service	»
Noto Railway Nanao Line
Noto-Mii	-	Wajima
