= Noto-Kashima Station =

Railway station in Anamizu, Ishikawa Prefecture, Japan

Noto-Kashima Station 能登鹿島駅
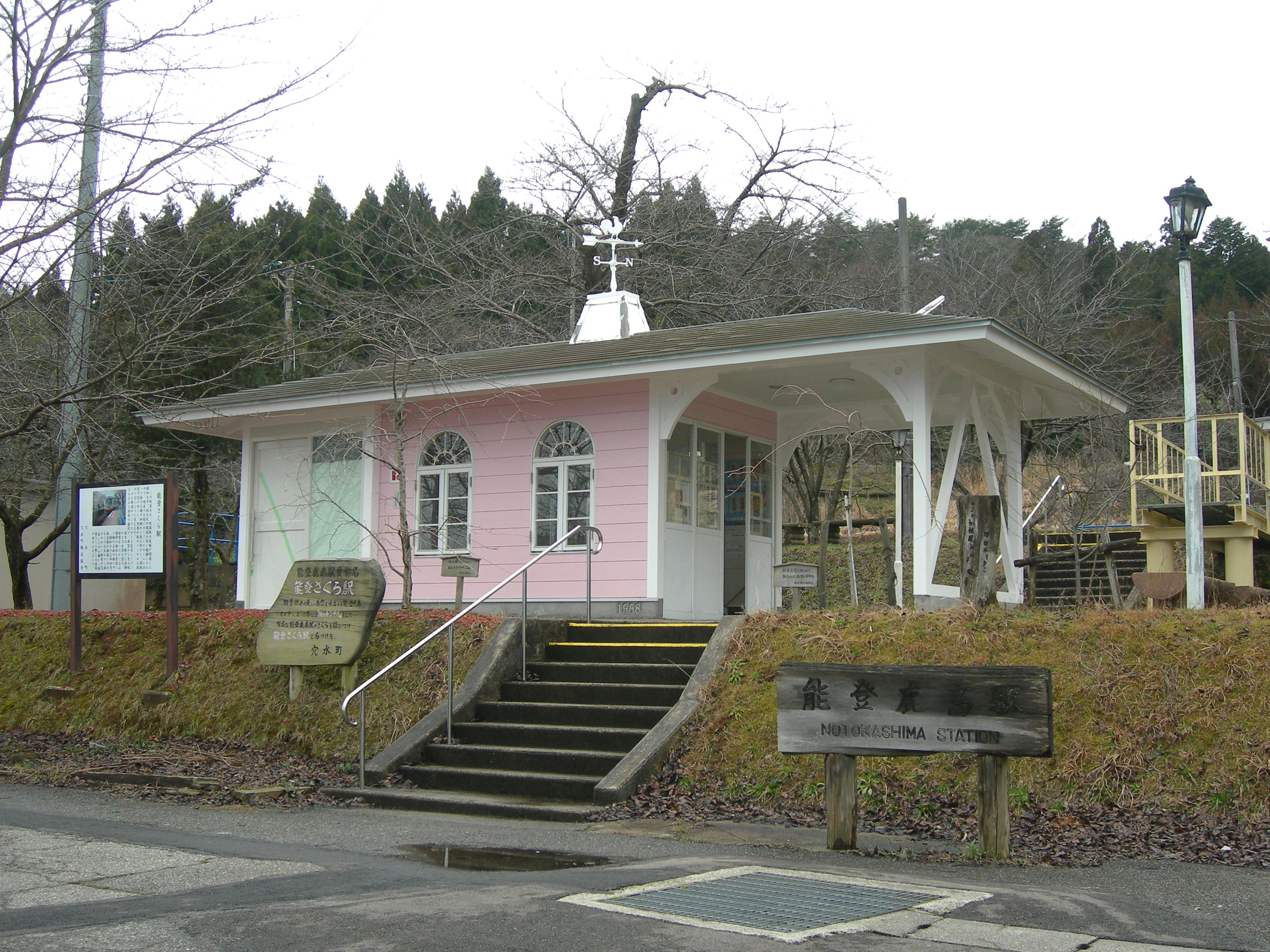
- Noto-Kashima Station in March 2010

General information
- Location: Hamada, Anamizu Town, Hōsu District, Ishikawa Prefecture 927-0039; Japan
- Coordinates: 37°10′47.46″N 136°53′53.24″E
- Operator: Noto Railway
- Line: Nanao Line
- Distance: 26.8 km (16.7 mi) from Nanao
- Platforms: 2 side platforms
- Tracks: 2

Construction
- Structure type: At grade

Other information
- Status: Unstaffed
- Website: Official website

History
- Opened: 27 August 1932; 93 years ago

Passengers
- 2019: 4 (Daily)

Services
Preceding station	Noto Railway	Following station
Nishigishi towards Nanao	Nanao Line	Anamizu Terminus
Location
- Location within Ishikawa Prefecture Location within Chubu region Location within Japan

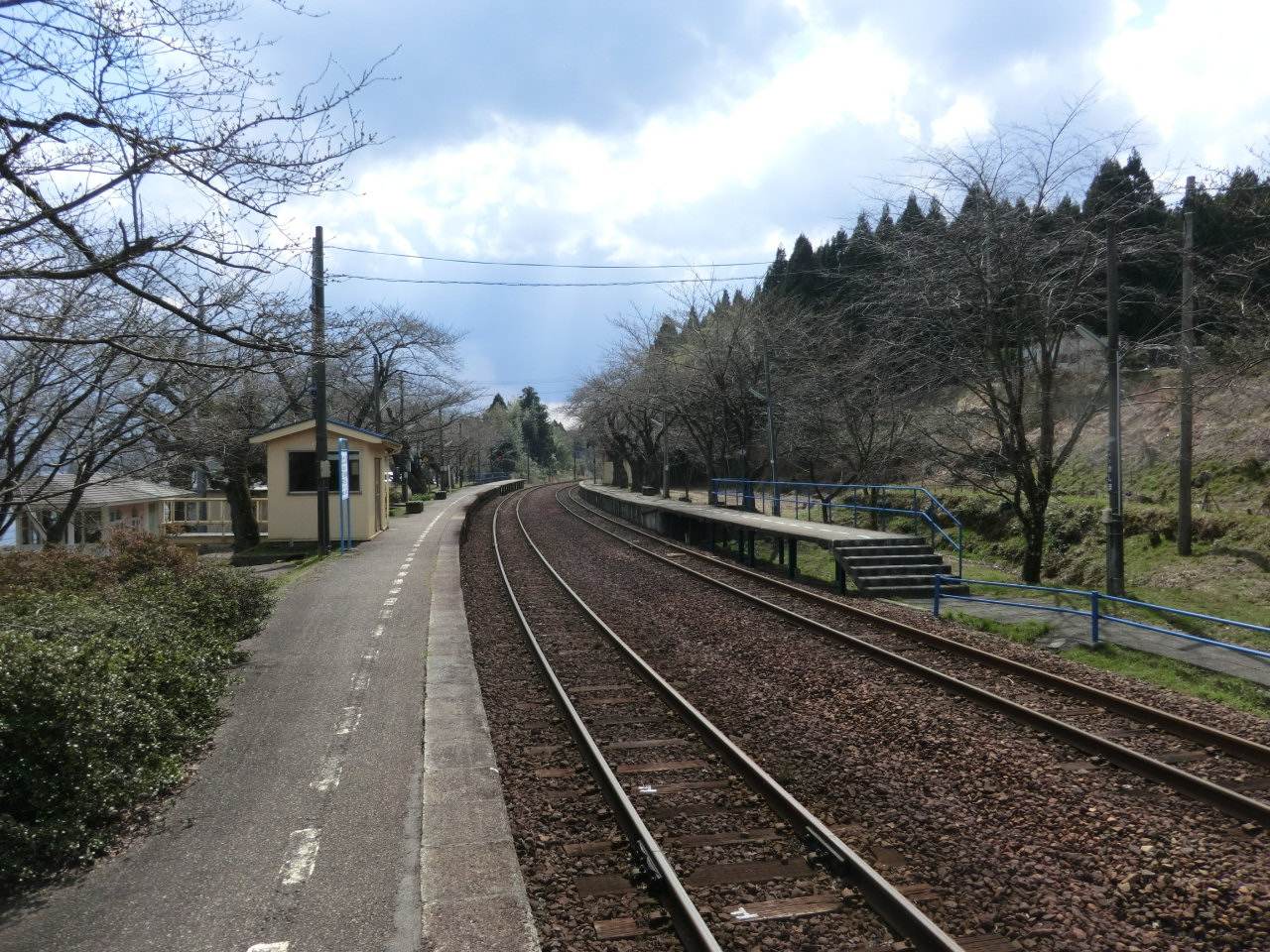
Platforms, March 2010

Noto-Kashima Station (能登鹿島駅, Noto-Kashima-eki) is a railway station on the Nanao Line in the town of Anamizu, Hōsu District, Ishikawa Prefecture, Japan, operated by the private railway operator Noto Railway.

== Lines ==
Noto-Kashiima Station is served by the Noto Railway Nanao Line between Nanao and Anamizu, and is 26.8 kms from the starting point of the line at Nanao.

== Station layout ==
The station consists of two opposed unnumbered ground-level side platforms connected by a level crossing. The station is unattended.

=== Platforms ===
Station side	■ Nanao Line	for Nanao and Kanazawa
Opposite side	■ Nanao Line	for Anamizu

== History ==
Noto-Nakajima Station opened on 27 August 1932. With the privatization of Japanese National Railways (JNR) on 1 April 1987, the station came under the control of JR West. On 1 September 1991, the section of the Nanao Line from Nanao to Anamizu was separated from JR West into the Noto Railway.

== Surrounding area ==
- National Route 249

== See also ==
- List of railway stations in Japan
