= Wakura Onsen =

Hot springs resort town in Ishikawa Prefecture, Japan

Wakura Onsen 和倉温泉
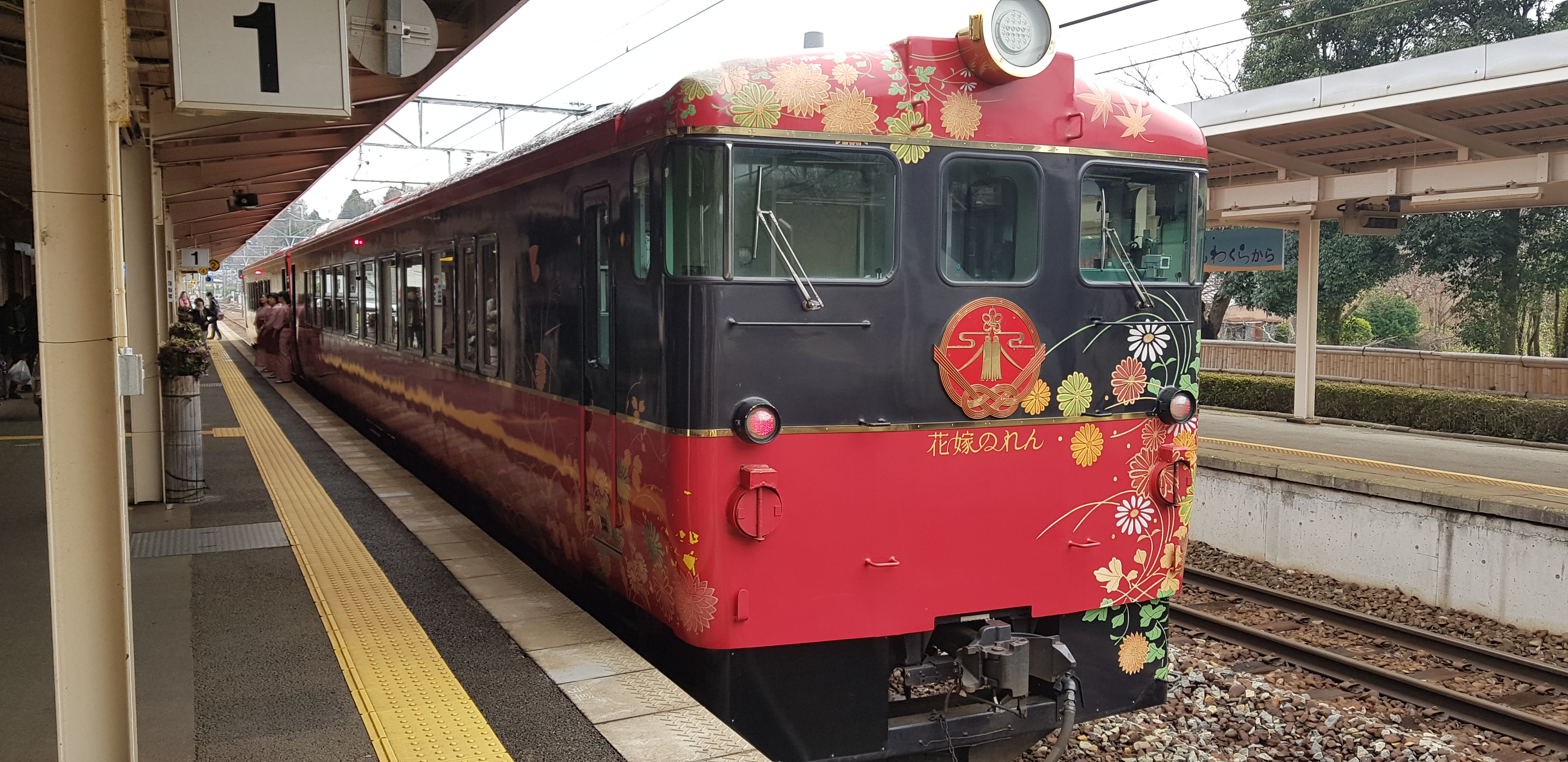
- Hanayome Noren train at Wakura-Onsen Station

- Location within Japan
- Interactive map of Wakura Onsen 和倉温泉
- Location: Nanao, Ishikawa, Japan
- Coordinates: 37.0867°N 136.918°E
- Elevation: 0 m (0 ft)
- Type: alkaline
- Discharge: 1600 liters/min
- Temperature: 89.1 deg C

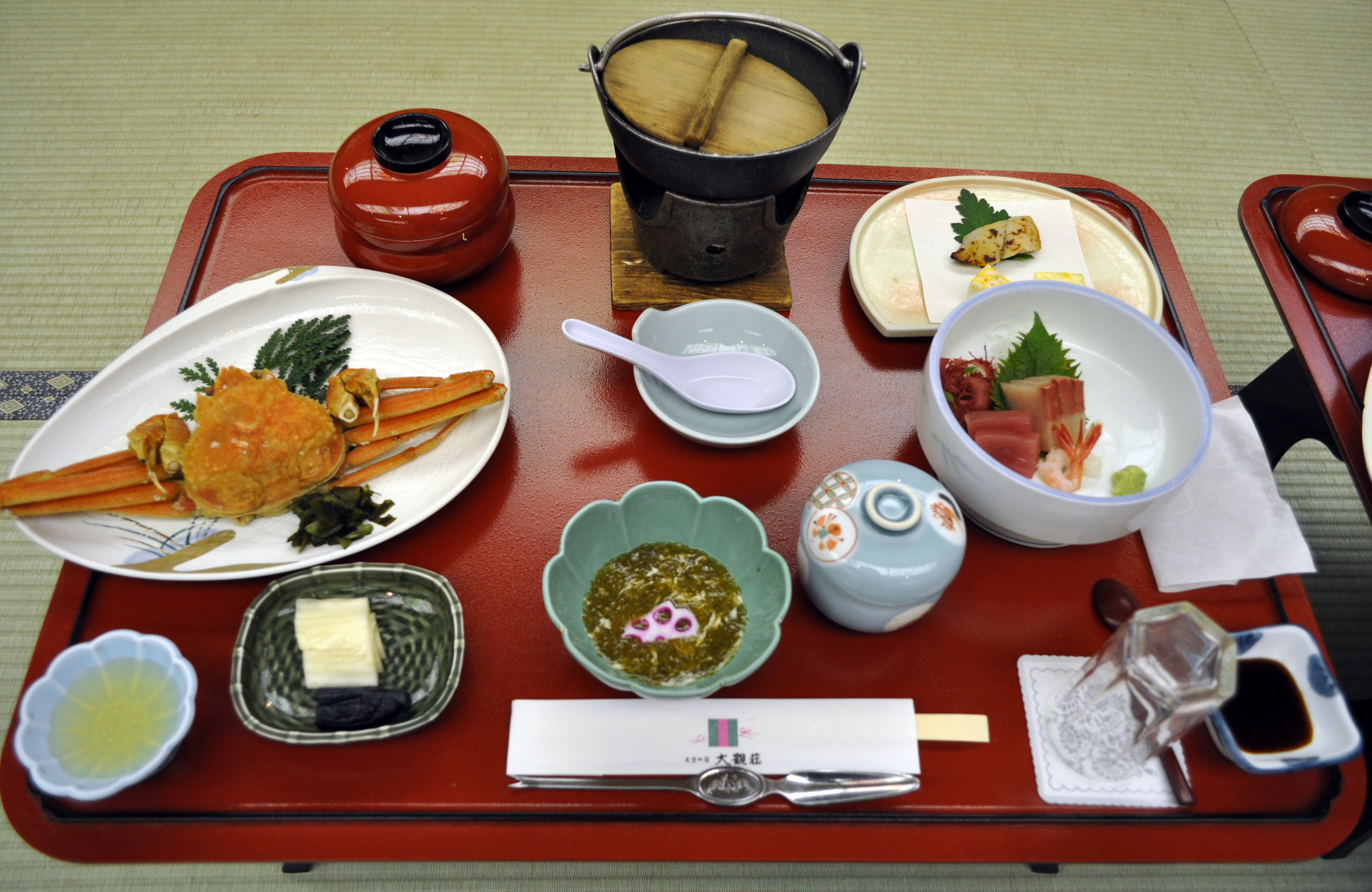
Dinner at Wakura Onsen

Wakura Onsen (和倉温泉) is a hot spring (onsen) resort on the edge of Nanao Bay at the base of the Noto Peninsula in Nanao, Ishikawa Prefecture, Japan and one of several well-known, high-end onsen resorts in Japan.

== History ==
Wakura Onsen has existed as a resort for 1,200 years. According to legend, the hot springs were originally discovered by a fisherman who noticed an injured crane bathing its wing in the warm water. There is a monument called the "Hot Water Reservoir of Wakura," located in the center of the onsen town "commemorating a heron resting in the ocean that led to the discovery of the hot springs."

The onsen was first mentioned in early Heian period documents, however full scale development initiated with the improvement of railway access in the Meiji period.

== Location ==
The Wakura hot springs system is are located next to the sea. There is a bathhouse in the town center that is open to the public for a fee. There are several ashiyu (foot baths) that are scattered throughout town that are available for public use without a fee. Across from a large ryokan complex is a hiroba (public square) with a hot spring sourced fountain, a shrine, and a park. Nearby is the Kado Isaburo Museum .

== Access ==
Wakura Onsen is approximately five minutes by car from Wakura Onsen Station on the JR West Nanao Line and Wakura IC on the Nanaota-Tsuruhama Bypass (National Route 249).

== See also ==
- List of hot springs in Japan
