= Nanao, Ishikawa =

Nanao 七尾市
- City
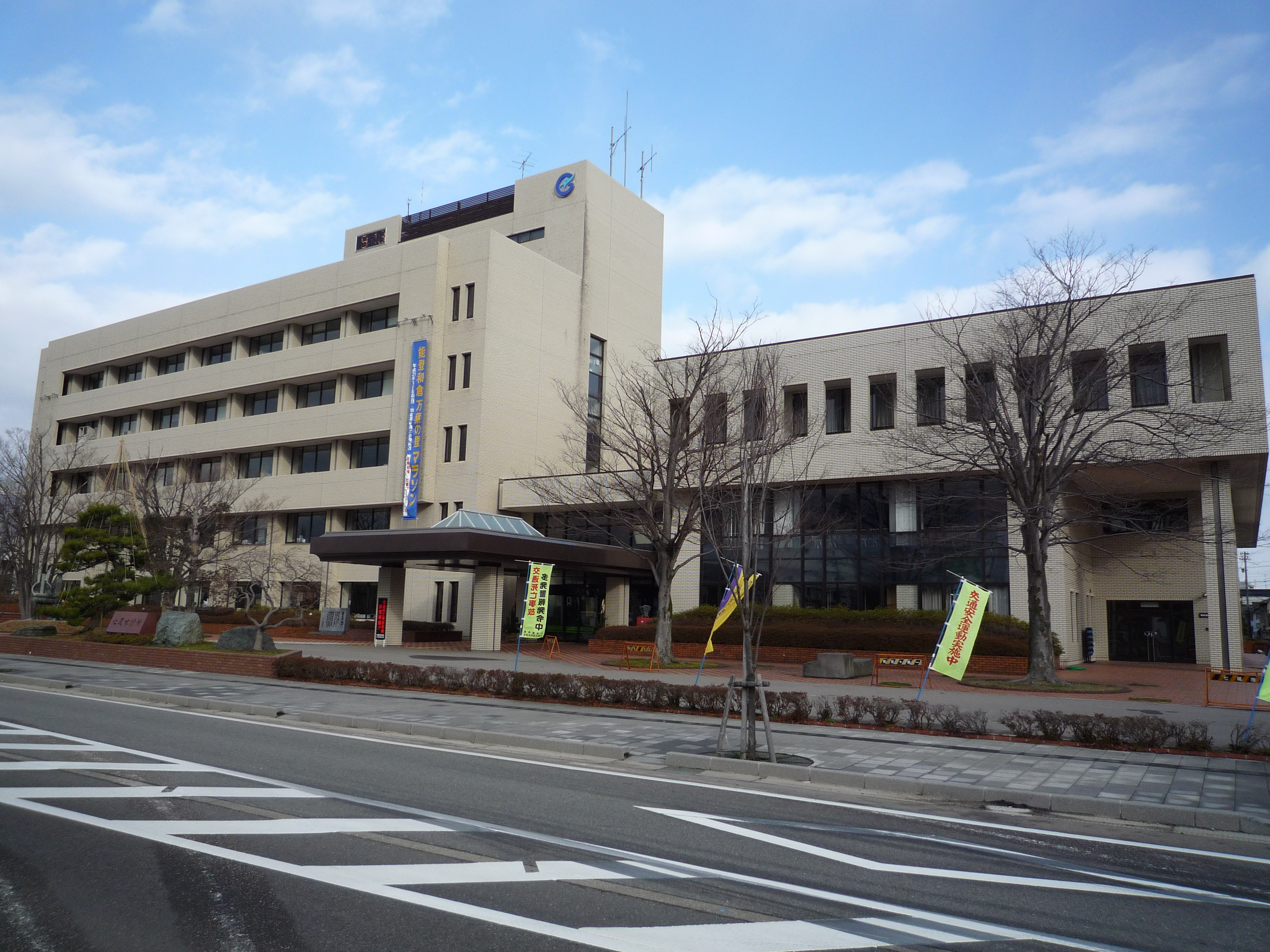
- Nanao City Hall

- Flag Seal

- Location of Nanao in Ishikawa Prefecture

- Coordinates: 37°2′35.3″N 136°58′2.8″E
- Country: Japan
- Region: Chūbu (Hokuriku)
- Prefecture: Ishikawa Prefecture

Government
  - Mayor: Yoshitaka Chatani (since November 2020)

Area
  - Total: 318.32 km^{2} (122.90 sq mi)

Population (March 31, 2022)
  - Total: 49,660
  - Density: 156.0/km^{2} (404.1/sq mi)
- Time zone: UTC+9 (Japan Standard Time)
- Phone number: 0767-53-1111
- Address: 1-25 Sodegaemachi, Nanao-shi, Ishikawa-ken 926-8611
- Climate: Cfa
- Website: www.city.nanao.lg.jp
- Symbols
- Bird: Common gull
- Flower: Azalea
- Tree: Pine

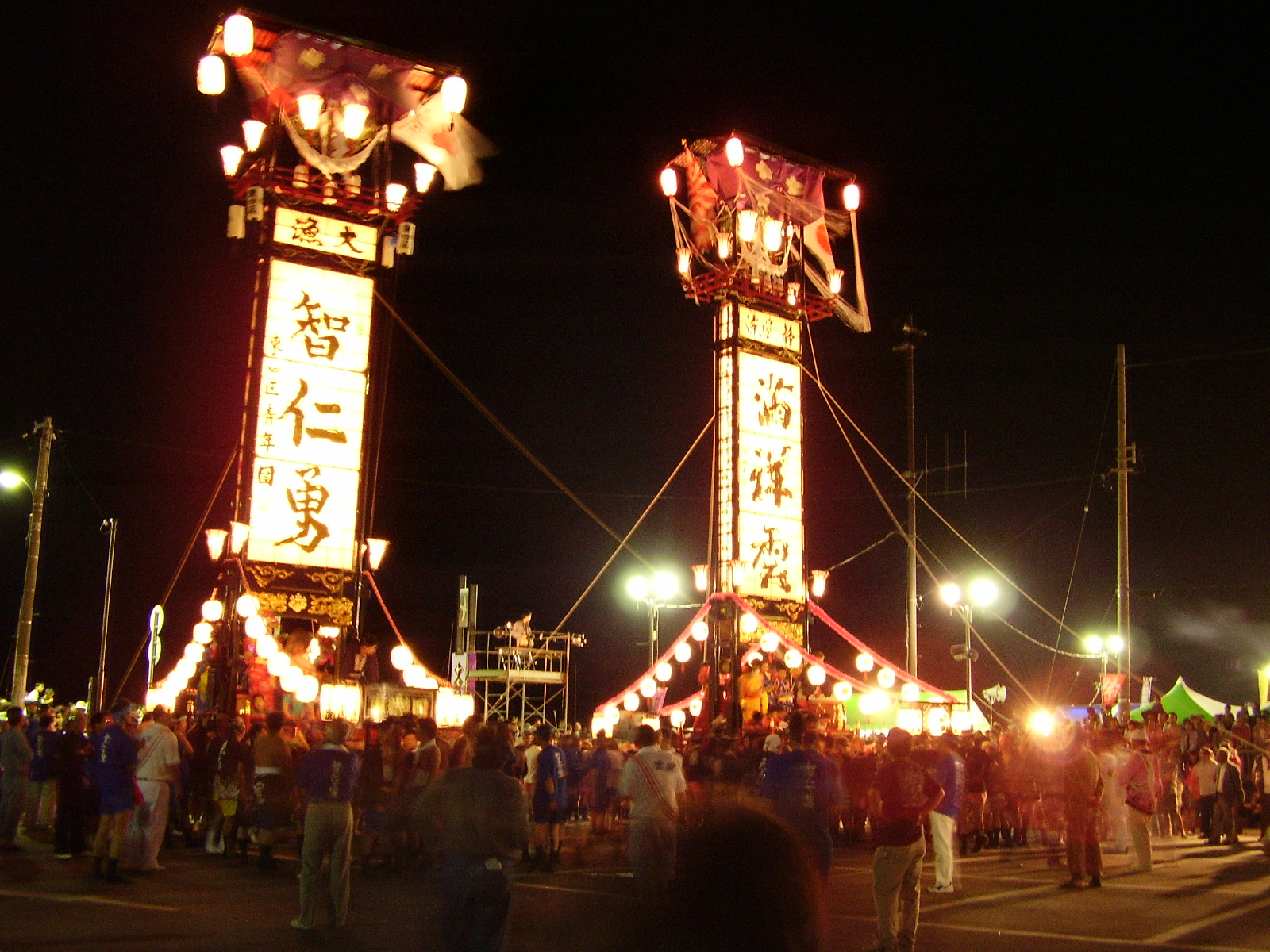
Ishizaki Kiriko Lantern Festival in August

Nanao (七尾市, Nanao-shi) is a city located in Ishikawa Prefecture, Japan. As of 31 March 2022, the city had an estimated population of 49,660 people in 21,809 households. The total area of the city was 318.32 square kilometres (122.90 sq mi). Nanao is the fifth largest city by population in Ishikawa, behind Kanazawa, Hakusan, Komatsu, and Kaga.

== Geography ==
Nanao occupies the southeastern coast of Noto Peninsula and is bordered by the Sea of Japan on the east and north, and Toyama Prefecture to the south. Parts of the city are within the borders of the Noto Hantō Quasi-National Park. The name "Nanao" (七尾) literally means "Seven Tails" and is said to be named for the seven mountain ridges (or "tails") surrounding Nanao that are visible when viewed from Joyama (七尾城山), site of the city's historical castle ruins. These ridges are called Kikuo (菊尾, "Chrysanthemum Tail"), Kameo (亀尾, "Turtle Tail"), Matsuo (松尾, "Pine Tail"), Torano'o (虎尾, "Tiger Tail"), Takeo (竹尾, "Bamboo Tail"), Umeo (梅尾, "Plum Tail"), and Tatsuo (龍尾, "Dragon Tail").

=== Neighbouring municipalities ===
- Ishikawa Prefecture
  - Anamizu
  - Nakanoto
  - Shika
- Toyama Prefecture
  - Himi

=== Climate ===
Nanao has a humid subtropical climate (Köppen Cfa) characterised by mild summers and cold winters with heavy snowfall. The average annual temperature in Nanao is 13.7 °C. The average annual rainfall is 2392 mm with September as the wettest month. The temperatures are highest on average in August, at around 26.0 °C, and lowest in January, at around 2.9 °C.

Climate data for Nanao (1991−2020 normals, extremes 1978−present)
Month	Jan	Feb	Mar	Apr	May	Jun	Jul	Aug	Sep	Oct	Nov	Dec	Year
Record high °C (°F)	16.8 (62.2)	21.9 (71.4)	28.3 (82.9)	30.1 (86.2)	32.1 (89.8)	34.3 (93.7)	37.4 (99.3)	38.1 (100.6)	37.1 (98.8)	31.9 (89.4)	26.3 (79.3)	22.1 (71.8)	38.1 (100.6)
Mean daily maximum °C (°F)	6.0 (42.8)	6.8 (44.2)	10.6 (51.1)	16.3 (61.3)	21.6 (70.9)	24.9 (76.8)	28.8 (83.8)	30.6 (87.1)	26.3 (79.3)	20.7 (69.3)	14.8 (58.6)	9.0 (48.2)	18.0 (64.5)
Daily mean °C (°F)	2.7 (36.9)	3.0 (37.4)	5.9 (42.6)	11.1 (52.0)	16.3 (61.3)	20.4 (68.7)	24.5 (76.1)	26.0 (78.8)	22.0 (71.6)	16.2 (61.2)	10.5 (50.9)	5.4 (41.7)	13.7 (56.6)
Mean daily minimum °C (°F)	−0.3 (31.5)	−0.6 (30.9)	1.5 (34.7)	6.2 (43.2)	11.6 (52.9)	16.7 (62.1)	21.3 (70.3)	22.5 (72.5)	18.4 (65.1)	12.2 (54.0)	6.5 (43.7)	2.0 (35.6)	9.8 (49.7)
Record low °C (°F)	−8.7 (16.3)	−7.1 (19.2)	−4.9 (23.2)	−2.4 (27.7)	2.1 (35.8)	9.4 (48.9)	14.2 (57.6)	14.4 (57.9)	8.2 (46.8)	2.0 (35.6)	−1.0 (30.2)	−5.6 (21.9)	−8.7 (16.3)
Average precipitation mm (inches)	207.4 (8.17)	126.3 (4.97)	139.1 (5.48)	126.0 (4.96)	120.0 (4.72)	168.5 (6.63)	222.7 (8.77)	183.0 (7.20)	206.5 (8.13)	156.7 (6.17)	205.7 (8.10)	255.1 (10.04)	2,117 (83.35)
Average snowfall cm (inches)	73 (29)	54 (21)	11 (4.3)	0 (0)	0 (0)	0 (0)	0 (0)	0 (0)	0 (0)	0 (0)	0 (0)	26 (10)	163 (64)
Average precipitation days (≥ 1.0 mm)	23.0	18.1	16.3	12.3	10.4	10.7	12.5	10.0	12.2	13.3	17.2	22.9	178.9
Average snowy days (≥ 3 cm)	7.7	5.9	1.2	0	0	0	0	0	0	0	0	2.9	17.7
Mean monthly sunshine hours	61.8	90.5	148.8	196.4	216.6	160.9	162.4	213.8	153.8	148.4	103.8	63.1	1,720.2
Source: Japan Meteorological Agency

== Demographics ==
Per Japanese census data, the population of Nanao has declined over the past 40 years.

Historical population
Year	Pop.	±%
1970	68,303	—
1980	69,945	+2.4%
1990	68,692	−1.8%
2000	63,963	−6.9%
2010	57,900	−9.5%
2020	50,300	−13.1%

== History ==
The area around Nanao was part of ancient Noto Province and contained the Nara period provincial capital and provincial temple. During the Sengoku Period (1467–1568), Nanao Castle was a major stronghold of the Hatakeyama clan, and was contested by the Uesugi clan and Maeda clan. The area became part Kaga Domain under the Edo period Tokugawa shogunate, with the exception of the Tsuruhama area, which was retained by the shogunate directly as tenryō territory.

Following the Meiji restoration, the area was organised into Kashima District, Ishikawa. The town of Nanao was established with the creation of the modern municipalities system on April 1, 1889. It was raised to city status on July 20, 1939.

On October 1, 2004, Nanao expanded by annexing the neighbouring municipalities of Nakajima, Notojima and Tatsuruhama (all from Kashima District).

On March 25, 2007, the 2007 Noto earthquake caused some property damage in Nanao, but no fatalities.

== Government ==
Nanao has a mayor-council form of government with a directly elected mayor and a unicameral city legislature of 18 members.

== Economy ==
Nanao is a regional commercial centre and a seaport on the Sea of Japan. Manufacturing, especially of bricks and cement, lumber processing, tourism, and agriculture are all major contributors of the local economy.

== Education ==
Nanao has 13 public elementary schools and four middle schools operated by the city government, and four public high school operated by the Ishikawa Prefectural Board of Education. There is also one private high school. The prefecture also operates one special education school.

== Transportation ==
=== Railway ===
West Japan Railway Company - Nanao Line

- Tokuda - Nanao - Wakura-Onsen

Noto Railway - Nanao Line

- Nanao - Wakura-Onsen- Tatsuruhama - Kasashiho - Noto-Nakajima - Nishigishi

=== Highway ===
National Route 159
National Route 160
National Route 249
National Route 470

=== Seaports ===
- Port of Nanao

=== Air ===
The city does not have an airport. The nearest airports are:

- Noto Airport, located 50 km (31 mi) south. The airport only provides one flight to Tokyo operated by ANA Airways.
- Toyama Airport, located 73.3 km (46 mi) south east. The airport provides domestic flights and international flights to parts of China and Taiwan.
- Komatsu Airport, located 100 km (62 mi) south west. The airport primarily serves domestic flights and international flights to China, South Korea and Taiwan.

== Local attractions ==
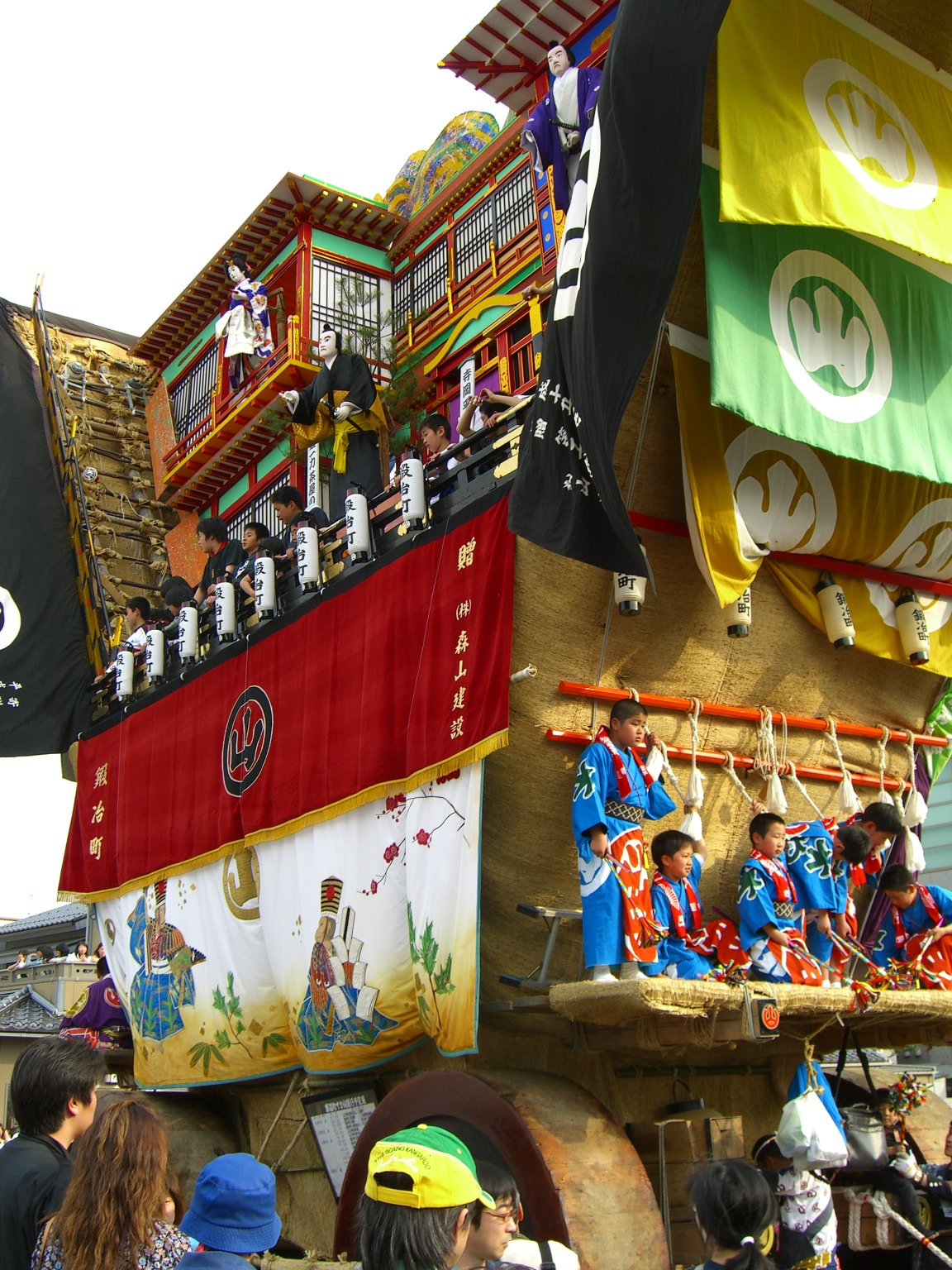
The Dekayama, a large mikoshi on wheels, passing through the crowd at the Seihakusai matsuri of Nanao

- Ishikawa Nanao Art Museum
- Nanao Castle site
- Noto Kokubun-ji site
- Notojima Glass Art Museum
- Susoezoana Kofun
- Wakura Onsen
- Yamanotera
- Hanayome Noren Museum

== In popular culture ==
The manga series Kimi wa Hōkago Insomnia and its live-action and anime adaptations take place in Nanao.

== Notable people from Nanao ==
- Min Ayahana, manga artist
- Wajima Hiroshi, sumo wrestler
- Kenta Matsudaira, Professional Table Tennis player
- Hasegawa Tōhaku, ancient Japanese painter

== Sister cities ==
- Bratsk, Irkutsk Oblast, Russia
- Gimcheon, North Gyeongsang, South Korea
- Jinzhou, Dalian, Liaoning, China
- Monterey, California, United States
- Morgantown, Kentucky, United States
