= Anamizu =

Town in Ishikawa, Japan

Anamizu 穴水町
- Town
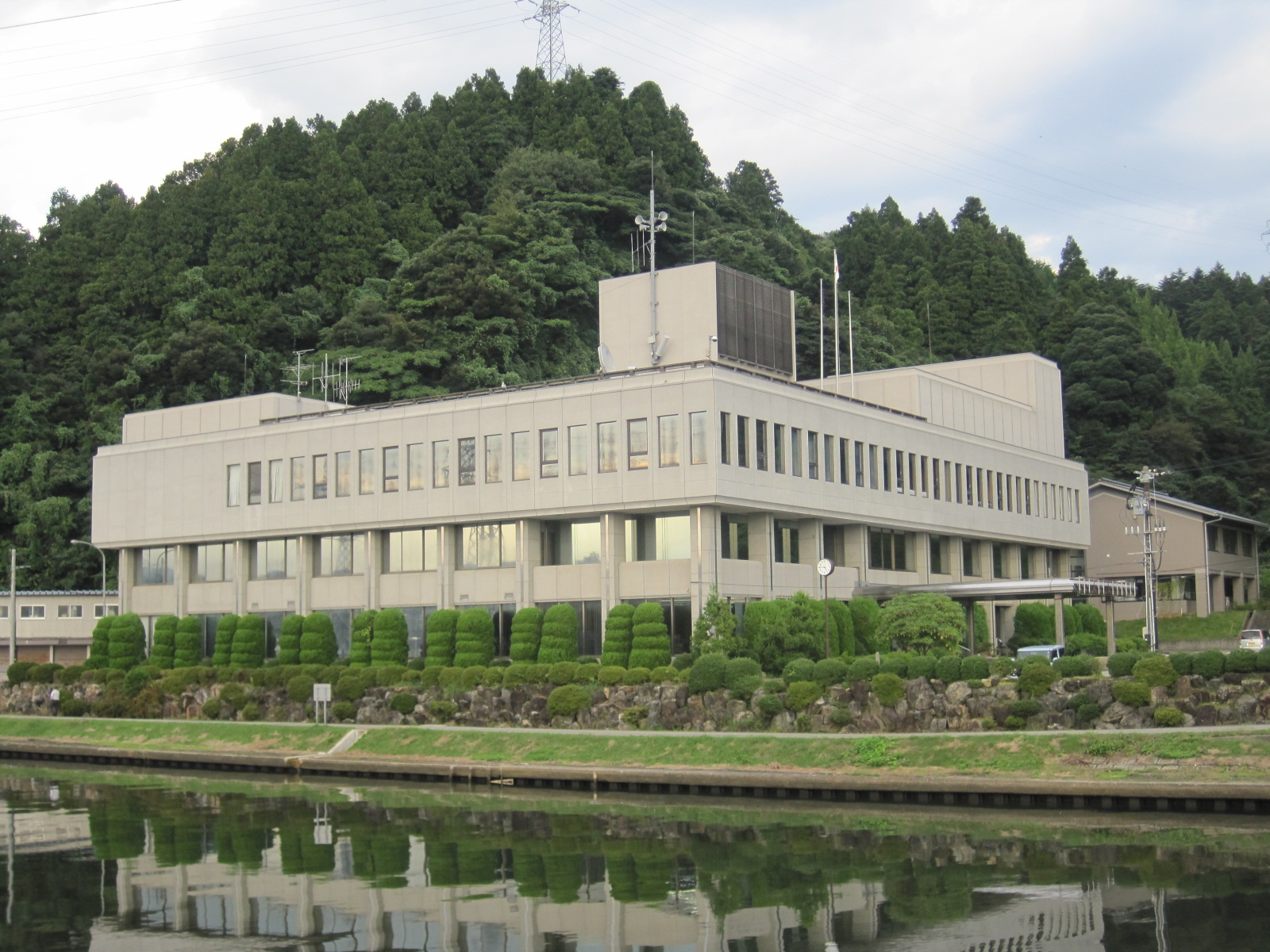
- Anamizu Town Hall

- Flag Emblem

- Location of Anamizu in Ishikawa Prefecture

- Coordinates: 37°13′51.3″N 136°54′44.2″E
- Country: Japan
- Region: Chūbu; Hokuriku
- Prefecture: Ishikawa
- District: Hōsu

Area
  - Total: 183.21 km^{2} (70.74 sq mi)

Population (September 30, 2021)
  - Total: 7,782
  - Density: 42.48/km^{2} (110.0/sq mi)
- Time zone: UTC+9 (Japan Standard Time)
- City symbols
- Tree: Hiba
- Flower: Bamboo lily
- Bird: Crested kingfisher
- Fish: Green pheasant
- Phone number: 0768-62-1000
- Address: 174 Kawajima, Anamizu-machi, Hōsu-gun, Ishikawa-ken 927-0492
- Website: Official website

Anamizu (穴水町, Anamizu-machi) is a town located in Hōsu District (formerly Fugeshi District), Ishikawa Prefecture, Japan. As of 30 September 2021, the town had an estimated population of 7,782 in 3,653 households, and a population density of 42 persons per km^{2}. The total area of the town was 183.21 square kilometres (70.74 sq mi).

== Geography ==
Anamizu occupies the southeastern coastline of Noto Peninsula, facing the Sea of Japan on the east and south. Anamizu has a humid subtropical climate (Köppen Cfa) characterized by mild summers and cold winters with heavy snowfall. The average annual temperature in Anamizu is 13.5 °C. The average annual rainfall is 2,352 mm with September as the wettest month. The temperatures are highest on average in August, at around 25.8 °C, and lowest in January, at around 2.9 °C.

Parts of the town are within the limits of the Noto Hantō Quasi-National Park.

=== Neighbouring municipalities ===
- Ishikawa Prefecture
  - Nanao
  - Noto
  - Shika
  - Wajima

== Demographics ==
Per Japanese census data, the population of Anamizu has declined over the past 50 years.

Historical population
Year	Pop.	±%
1970	15,488	—
1980	14,044	−9.3%
1990	12,831	−8.6%
2000	11,267	−12.2%
2010	9,735	−13.6%
2020	7,890	−19.0%

== History ==
The area around Anamizu was part of ancient Noto Province. During the Sengoku Period (1467–1568), the area was contested between the Hatakeyama clan, Uesugi clan and Maeda clan, with the area becoming part of Kaga Domain under the Edo period Tokugawa shogunate. Following the Meiji restoration, the area was organised into Fugeshi District, Ishikawa. The village of Anamizu was established on April 1, 1889, with the establishment of the modern municipalities system. It was raised to town status on August 10, 1903. Anamizu annexed the neighbouring villages of Shimazaki and Tobo on April 1, 1908; the villages of Kabuto and Sumiyoshi on March 31, 1954; and the village of Morohashi on March 10, 1955.

Anamizu and its surrounding area experienced the 2007 Noto earthquake on March 25, 2007, and the 2024 Noto earthquake on January 1, 2024. After the disaster, the survivors were housed in the municipal stadium named after sumo wrestler Endō, a native of Anamizu. Considered a local hero in his hometown, his sanshō trophies are displayed there. On February 6, 2024, Endō was part of a delegation of wrestlers from the prefecture (along with Ōnosato, Kagayaki and former Tochinonada); charged with symbolically presenting Governor Hiroshi Hase with the sums raised during the January tournament and donations from the Sumo Association.

== Economy ==
The economy of Anamizu is based on agriculture and commercial fishing.

== Education ==
Anamizu has two public elementary schools and one public middle school operated by the town government, and one public high school operated by the Ishikawa Prefectural Board of Education.

== Transportation ==
=== Railway ===
Noto Railway - Nanao Line

- Anamizu - Noto-Kashima

=== Highway ===
National Route 249
National Route 470

== Local attractions ==
- Anamizu's symbol is the Boramachi Yagura (ボラ待ちやぐら), a distinctive wooden fishing structure of which there is one in the Noto Bay on both the southern and northern borders of Anamizu town.

== Events ==
- The last weekend in January is the Anamizu Oyster Festival (カキまつり). At this festival, guests can purchase oysters or other foods from stalls and cook them on grills near the center of the venue. The venue changes every year but was held at the Anamizu Harbour Asunaro (穴水港湾あすなろ広場) in 2010.
- The third weekend in August is the celebration of Percival Lowell's contribution to astronomy and his time spent in the Noto peninsula. The main shopping street is lit with hundreds of candles and visitors can enjoy live music and food stalls.
- In the last week in October, the Anamizu Harvest Festival is celebrated. A few small stalls line the main shopping street in the town and visitors can enjoy some speciality foods.
- The Anamizu Town Festival (文化祭) is held the first weekend in November with events held all around the town, especially at the Noto Culture Centre.
