= Noto-Ninomiya Station =

Railway station in Nakanoto, Ishikawa Prefecture, Japan

Noto-Ninomiya Station 能登二宮駅
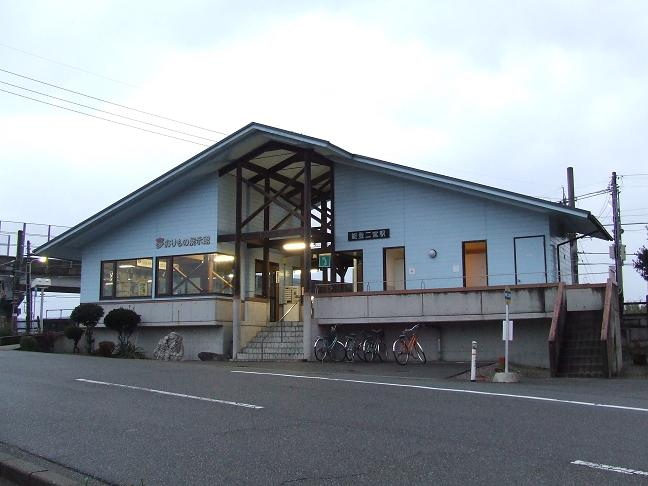
- Noto-Ninomiya Station in January 2009

General information
- Location: Shikibi-e 7-1, Nakamoto-machi, Kashima-gun, Ishikawa-ken 929-1802; Japan
- Coordinates: 36.9847°N 136.9173°E
- Operator: JR West
- Line: ■ Nanao Line
- Distance: 46.1 km from Tsubata
- Platforms: 1 side platform
- Tracks: 1

Construction
- Structure type: At grade

Other information
- Status: Unstaffed
- Website: Official website

History
- Opened: 10 February 1960
Location
- Location within Japan

Noto-Ninomiya Station (能登二宮駅, Noto-Ninomiya-eki) is a railway station on the Nanao Line in Nakanoto, Kashima District, Ishikawa Prefecture, Japan, operated by the West Japan Railway Company (JR West).

== Lines ==
Noto-Ninomiya Station is served by the Nanao Line, and is located 46.1 kilometers from the end of the line at Tsubata and 57.6 kilometers from Kanazawa.

== Station layout ==
The station consists of one ground-level side platform serving a single bi-directional track. The station is unattended.

== Adjacent stations ==
«	Service	»
Nanao Line
Yoshikawa	-	Tokuda

== History ==
The station opened on February 10, 1960. With the privatization of Japanese National Railways (JNR) on 1 April 1987, the station came under the control of JR West. A new station buildings as completed in November 1993.

== Surrounding area ==
- National Route 159

== See also ==
- List of railway stations in Japan
