= Noto Kagaribi =

Japanese limited express train service

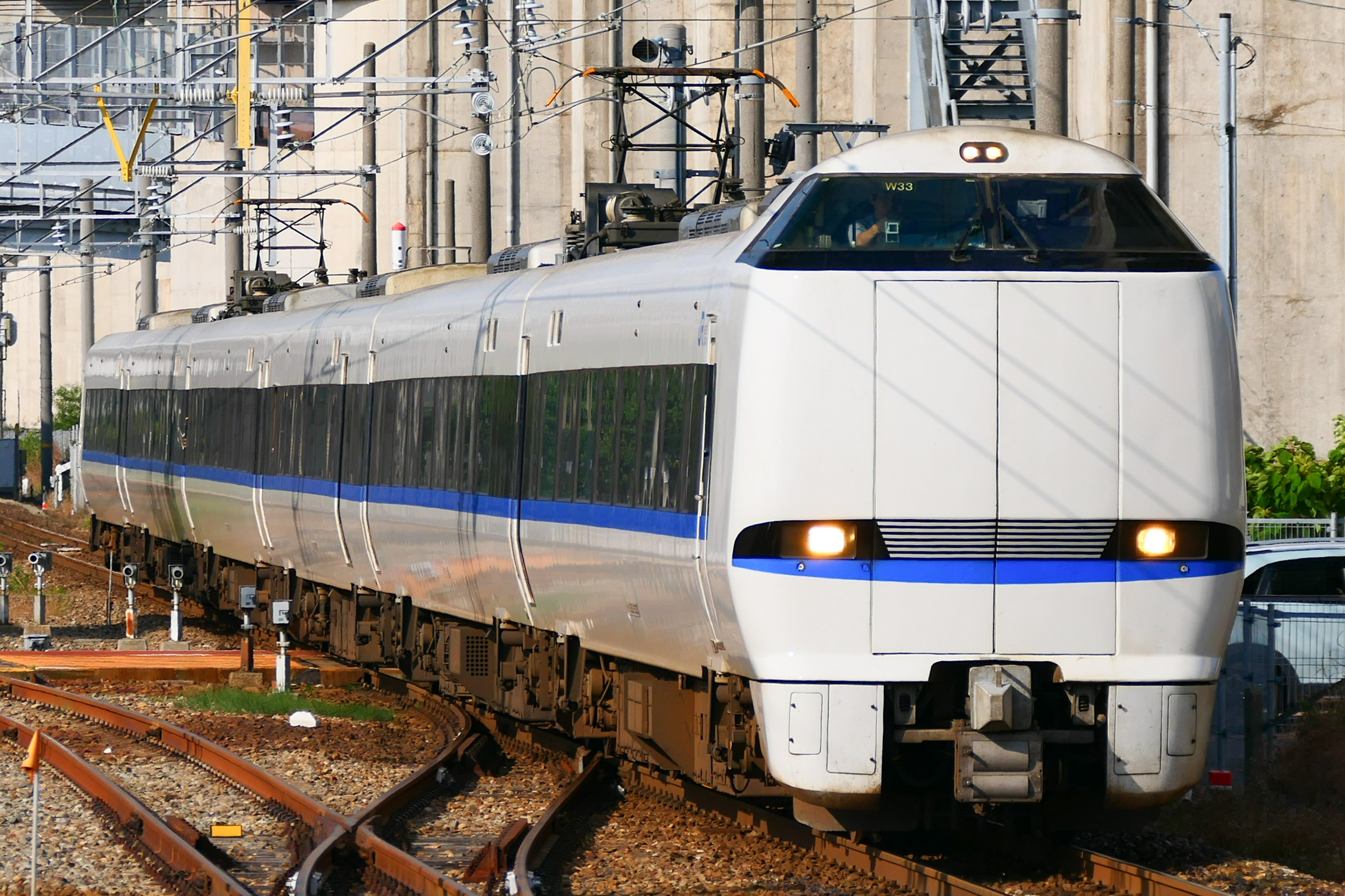
- Limited Express "Noto Kagaribi" entering Morimoto Station

Overview
- Service type: Limited express
- Status: Operational
- Locale: Ishikawa Prefecture, Japan
- First service: 14 March 2015
- Current operator: JR West

Route
- Termini: Kanazawa; Wakura-Onsen
- Service frequency: 5 return services daily
- Lines used: IR Ishikawa Railway Line, Nanao Line

On-board services
- Class: Ordinary + Green

Technical
- Rolling stock: 681 series, 683 series
- Track gauge: 1,067 mm (3 ft 6 in)

The Noto Kagaribi (能登かがり火) is a limited express train service operated by West Japan Railway Company (JR West) between Kanazawa and Wakura-Onsen in Ishikawa Prefecture, Japan, via the IR Ishikawa Railway Line and Nanao Line since 14 March 2015.

== Service outline ==
Five return services operate daily between Kanazawa and Wakura-Onsen, supplementing the Thunderbird services truncated with the opening of the Hokuriku Shinkansen extension from Nagano to Kanazawa on 14 March 2015.

The name, meaning "Noto bonfire", is intended to evoke an image of the bonfires and torches that form part of the summer festivals on the Noto Peninsula.

== Rolling stock ==
The services use 681 series and 683 series EMUs.

== Formations ==
Trains are generally formed as shown below, with car 1 at the Wakura-Onsen (northern) end. All cars are no-smoking.

Car No.	1	2	3
Accommodation	Reserved	Reserved	Non-reserved

== History ==
The name of the new train services was officially announced by JR West's Kanazawa Division on 7 October 2014.

== See also ==
- List of named passenger trains of Japan
