= Yamanotera =

Group of temples in Ishikawa, Japan

Coordinates: 37°02′58″N 136°57′10″E

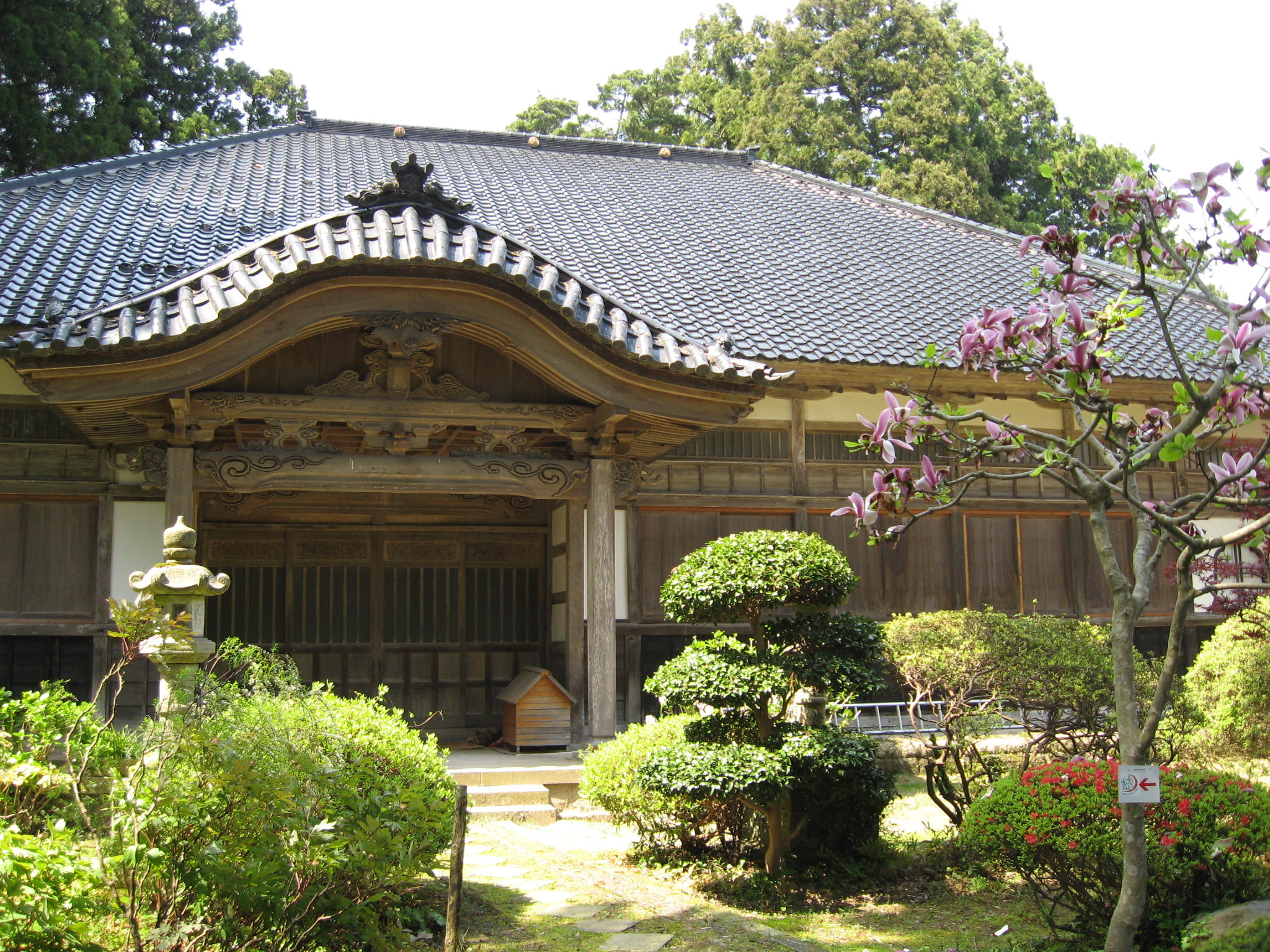
One of the temples of the Yamanotera

Yamanotera (山の寺) is the collective name for a group of temples located on a hill in Nanao, Ishikawa Prefecture, Japan.

In 1581, Maeda Toshiie, the Sengoku period ruler of Noto Province ordered the construction of 29 Buddhist temples as part of the defenses of Nanao Castle. All of the major Buddhist sects were represented, with the exception of the Jōdo Shinshū sect, which was the sect of the Ikkō-ikki movement that Maeda Toshiie was attempting to suppress. Today sixteen temples remain in 1581 and are considered of great historical importance to the local people.
