= Tokuda Station (Ishikawa) =

Railway station in Nanao, Ishikawa Prefecture, Japan

Tokuda Station 徳田駅
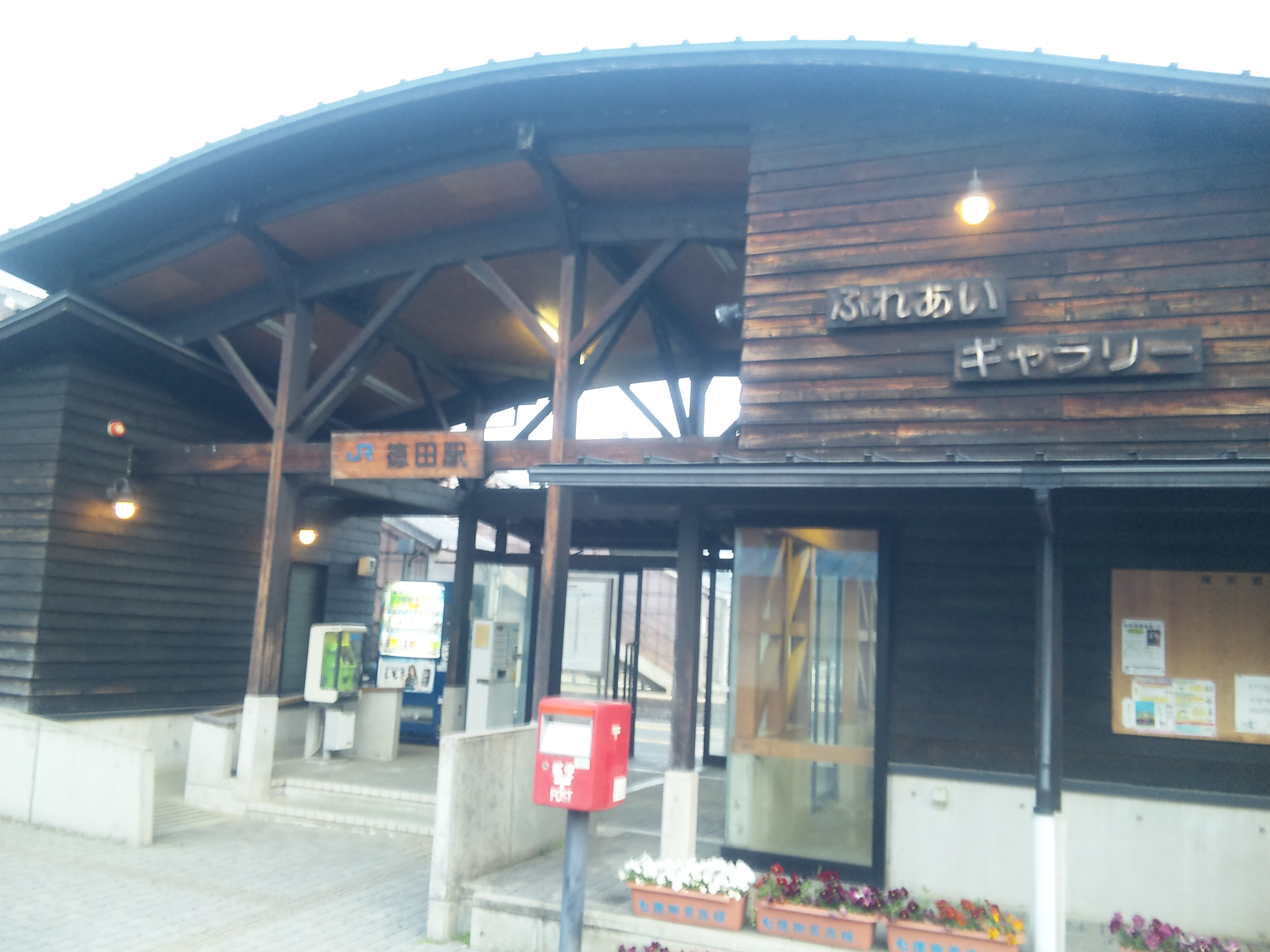
- Tokuda Station in January 2009

General information
- Location: Shimomachi, Nanao-shi, Ishikawa-ken 926-0824; Japan
- Coordinates: 37°0′27″N 136°55′49″E
- Operator: JR West
- Line: ■ Nanao Line
- Distance: 48.9 km from Tsubata
- Platforms: 2 side platforms
- Tracks: 2

Construction
- Structure type: At grade

Other information
- Status: Unstaffed
- Website: Official website

History
- Opened: 24 April 1898
Location
- Location within Japan

Tokuda Station (徳田駅, Tokuda-eki) is a railway station on the Nanao Line in Nanao, Ishikawa, Japan, operated by the West Japan Railway Company (JR West).

== Lines ==
Tokuda Station is served by the Nanao Line, and is located 48.9 kilometers from the end of the line at Tsubata and 60.4 kilometers from Kanazawa.

== Station layout ==
The station consists of two opposed unnumbered ground-level side platforms connected by a footbridge. The station is unattended.

=== Platforms ===
station side	■ Nanao Line	for Tsubata and Kanazawa
opposite side	■ Nanao Line	for Nanao

== Adjacent stations ==
«	Service	»
Nanao Line
Noto-Ninomiya	-	Nanao

== History ==
The station opened on April 24, 1898. With the privatization of Japanese National Railways (JNR) on 1 April 1987, the station came under the control of JR West.

== Surrounding area ==
- Nanao Shinonome High School
- Nanao Special Education School

== See also ==
- List of railway stations in Japan
