= Noto Railway =

Railway line in Ishikawa Prefecture, Japan

Noto Railway Co., Ltd.
- Native name: のと鉄道株式会社/七尾铁道式会社
- Company type: Third sector
- Genre: Railway transport
- Founded: 30 April 1987
- Headquarters: Japan
- Area served: Ishikawa
- Services: Passenger railway
- Website: www.nototetsu.co.jp

Line of Noto Railway as of 2009

Noto Railway (のと鉄道, Noto Tetsudō) is a Japanese railway company on the Noto Peninsula in Ishikawa Prefecture. It runs the Nanao Line with eight stops between Nanao and Anamizu, a distance of 33 kilometres (21 mi). There are 34 trains plus sightseeing trains on the line. It previously operated the Noto Line.

Noto Railway is a third-sector company or a corporation jointly funded by private entities and local governments. Its major shareholders are Ishikawa Prefecture (33.6% ownership), Hokkoku Bank (5.0%), the Town of Noto (4.2%), Hokuriku Bank (4.2%), and others.

From Nanao to Wakuraonsen Station, the JR Thunderbird used to run alongside the Noto Tetsudō trains. This has been discontinued when the Hokuriku Shinkansen was extended on 16 April 2024.

== History ==
Noto Railway formed on 30 April 1987. It opened the Noto Railway Noto Line, between Noto-Anamizu Station and Takojima Station, on 25 March 1988. It changed to the Noto Railway Nanao Line between Nanao Station and Wajima Station on 1 September 1991.

The Nanao Line between Anamizu Station and Wajima Station was discontinued on 1 April 2001. The Noto Line between Anamizu Station and Takojima Station was discontinued on 1 April 2005.

In June 2005, the railway moved its headquarters from Noto, Ishikawa to Anamizu, Ishikawa.

The railway company collaborated with the anime television series, Hanasaku Iroha, between 2011 and 2012. This collaboration was renewed in 2013.

== Stations ==
N01: Nanao 七尾

N02: Wakuraonsen 和倉温泉

N03: Tatsurahama 田鶴浜

N04: Kasashiho 笠師保

N05: Noto-Nakajima 能登中島

N06: Nishigishi 西岸

N07: Noto-Kashima 能登鹿島

N08: Anamizu 穴水

N09: Noto-Mii 能登三井 (Closed)

N10: Noto-Ichinose 能登市ノ瀬 (Closed)

N11: Wajima 輪島 (Closed)
