= Wakuraonsen Station =

Railway station in Nanao, Ishikawa Prefecture, Japan

Wakuraonsen Station 和倉温泉駅
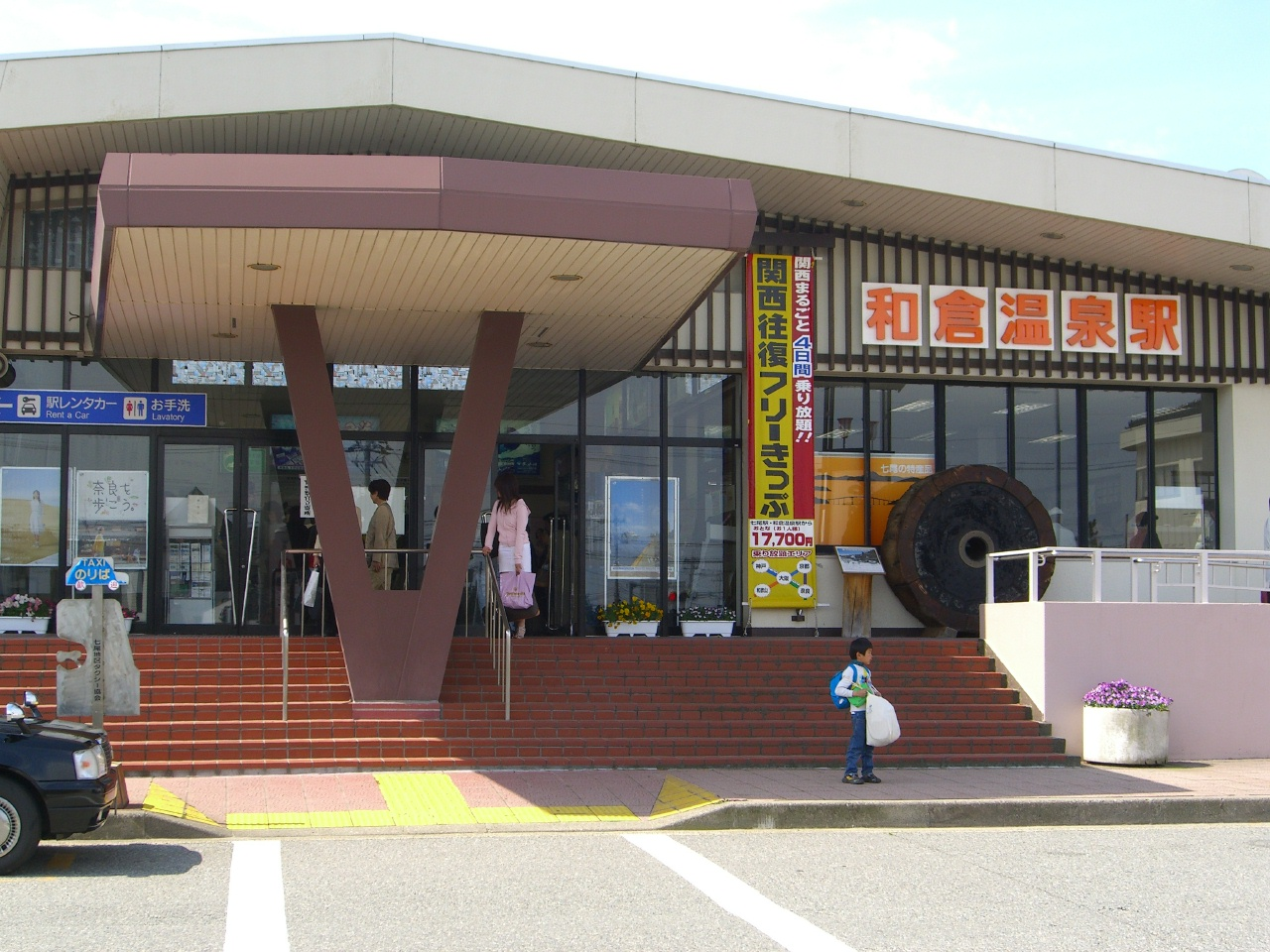
- Wakuraonsen Station in May 2006

General information
- Location: Ishizaki-machi, Nanao-shi, Ishikawa-ken 926-0171; Japan
- Coordinates: 37°4′30.10″N 136°55′31.73″E
- Operator: JR West; Noto Railway
- Lines: JR Nanao Line; Nanao Line
- Platforms: 2 side platforms
- Tracks: 2

Construction
- Structure type: At grade

Other information
- Status: Staffed (Midori no Madoguchi )
- Website: Official website

History
- Opened: 15 December 1898; 127 years ago
- Former names: Wakura (until 1980)

Passengers
- FY2019: 438 (JR West) daily; 200 (Noto Railway) daily

Services
Preceding station	JR West	Following station
Nanao towards Tsubata	JR Nanao Line	Terminus
Preceding station	Noto Railway	Following station
Nanao Terminus	Nanao Line	Terminus
Location
- Location within Ishikawa Prefecture Location within Chubu region Location within Japan

Wakuraonsen Station (和倉温泉駅, Wakuraonsen-eki) is a railway station in the city of Nanao, Ishikawa, Japan, operated jointly by West Japan Railway Company (JR West) and the private railway operator Noto Railway.

== Lines ==
Wakuraonsen Station is served by the Nanao Line, and is located 59.5 kilometers from the end of the line at Tsubata. It is also 3.5 kilometers from Anamizu on the Noto Railway's Nanao Line.

== Station layout ==
The station has two opposed ground-level side platforms connected by a footbridge. The station has a "Midori no Madoguchi" staffed ticket office.

=== Platforms ===
1	■ Nanao Line	for Osaka, Tsubata, Nanao and Kanazawa (express only)
2	■ Nanao Railway	for Nanao for Anamizu

== Adjacent stations ==
«	Service	»
JR Nanao Line
Nanao	Noto Kagaribi	Terminus

== History ==
The station opened on 15 December 1925, as simply Wakura Station (和倉駅). It was renamed Wakuraonsen on 1 July 1980. With the privatization of JNR on 1 April 1987, the station came under the control of JR West.

== Passenger statistics ==
In fiscal 2015, the JR West portion of the station was used by an average of 626 passengers daily and the Noto Railway portion of the station was used by an average of 263 passengers daily (boarding passengers only).

== Surrounding area ==
- Wakura Onsen

== See also ==
- List of railway stations in Japan
