= Wajima Station =

Abandoned railway station in Wajima, Ishikawa prefecture, Japan

Coordinates: 37°23′21.0″N 136°54′22.1″E

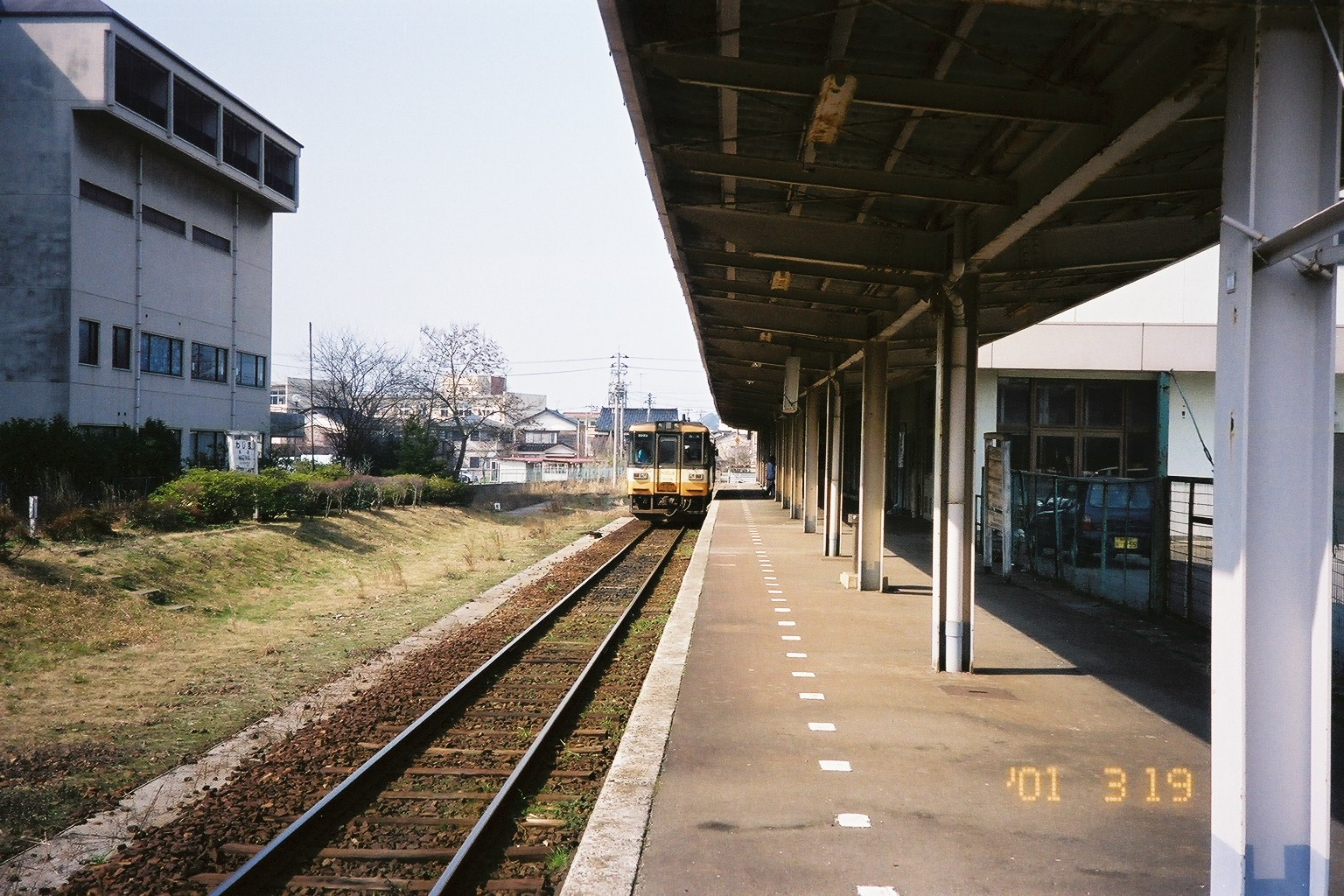
Wajima Station in March 2001 just before the closure of the station

Wajima Station (輪島駅, Wajima-eki) was a railway station located in Wajima, Ishikawa Prefecture, Japan, first opened in 1935. The station was closed in 2001 when the Nanao line between Anamizu and Wajima was abandoned.

== Line ==
- Noto Railway
  - Nanao Line

== Adjacent stations ==
«	Service	»
Noto Railway Nanao Line
Noto-Ichinose	-	Terminus
