= Anamizu Station =

Railway station in Anamizu, Ishikawa Prefecture, Japan

Anamizu Station 穴水駅
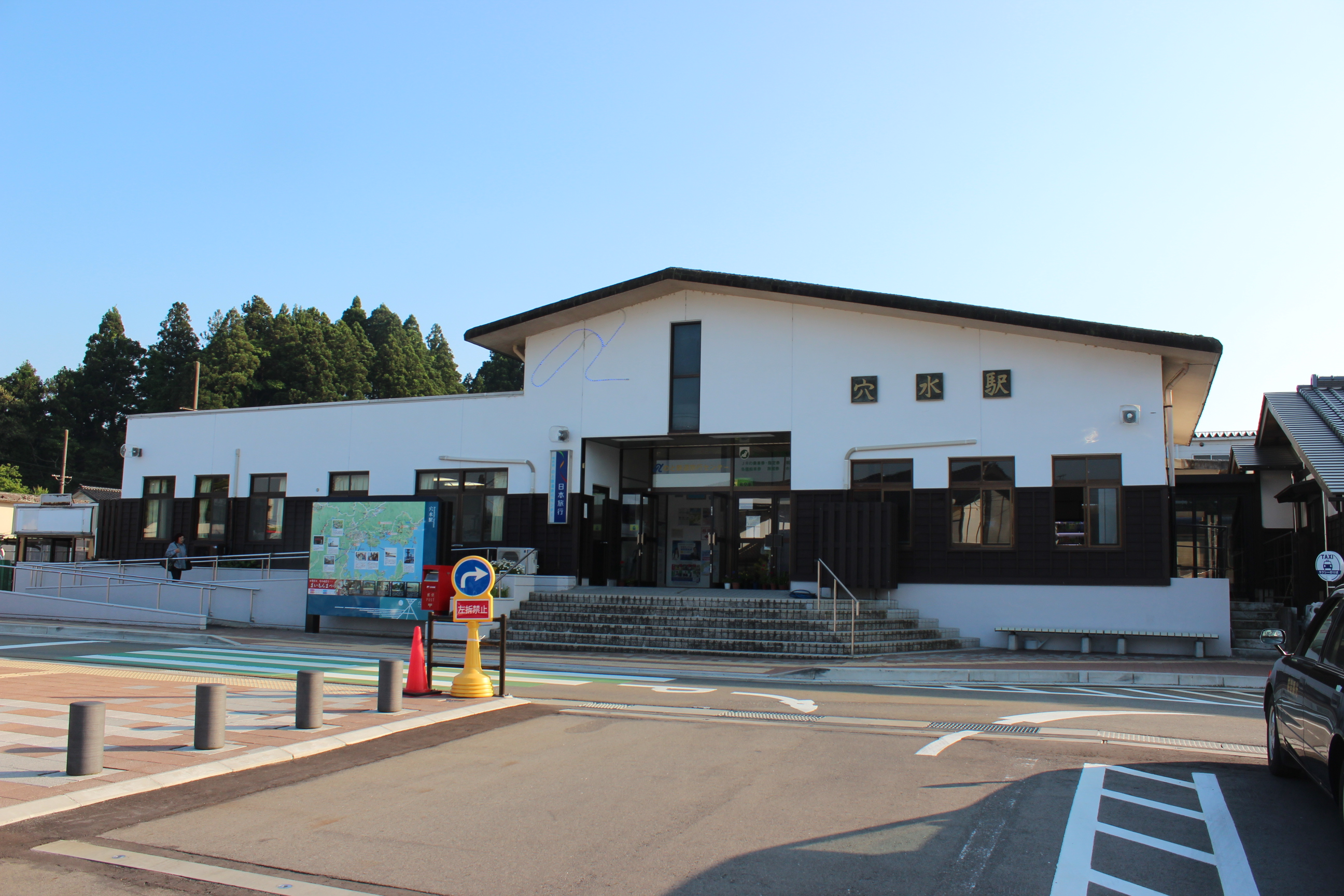
- Station building in May 2016

General information
- Location: 33 Omachi, Anamizu Town, Hōsu District, Ishikawa Prefecture 927-0026; Japan
- Coordinates: 37°13′40.95″N 136°54′16.81″E
- Operator: Noto Railway
- Line: Nanao Line
- Distance: 33.1 km (20.6 mi) from Nanao
- Platforms: 1 side + 1 island + 1 bay platform
- Tracks: 4

Construction
- Structure type: At grade

Other information
- Status: Staffed
- Website: Official website

History
- Opened: 27 August 1932; 94 years ago

Passengers
- FY2019: 113 daily

Services
| Preceding station | Noto Railway | Following station |
|---|---|---|
| Noto-Kashima towards Nanao | Nanao Line | Terminus |
Location
- Location within Ishikawa Prefecture Location within Chubu region Location within Japan

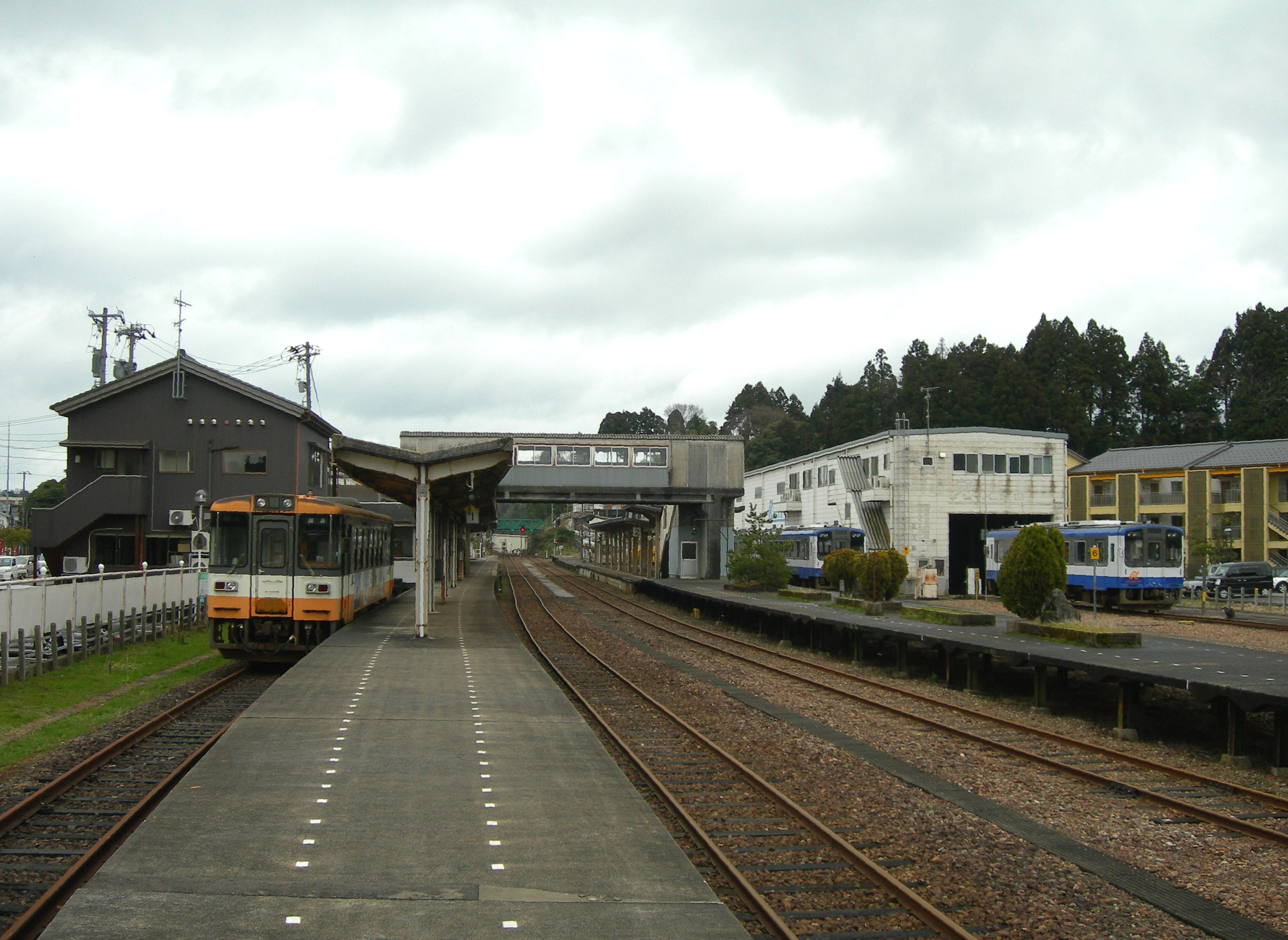
Platforms

Anamizu Station (穴水駅, Anamizu-eki) is a railway station on the Nanao Line in the town of Anamizu, Hōsu District, Ishikawa Prefecture, Japan, operated by the private railway operator Noto Railway.

== Lines ==
Anamizu Station is a terminus of the Noto Railway Nanao Line, and is located 33.1 km from the opposing terminus of the line at Nanao.

== Station layout ==
The station consists of one ground-level side platform, one island platform and one bay platform, connected by a footbridge. However, only Platform 1 is current in use. The station is staffed.

=== Platforms ===
| 0 | ■ Nanao Line | (not in use) |
| 1 | ■ Nanao Line | for Wakura-Onsen and Nanao |
| 2, 3 | ■ Noto Line | (not in use) |

== History ==
Anamizu Station opened on 27 August 1932 as a station on the Nanao Line. Operations on the Noto Line to Ukawa began on 15 June 1959. With the privatization of Japanese National Railways (JNR) on 1 April 1987, the station came under the control of JR West. On 1 September 1991, the section of the Nanao Line from Nanao to Anamizu was separated from JR West into the Noto Railway. On 1 April 2001, the Nanao Line discontinued operations past Anamizu to Wajima, making Anamizu the terminus of the line. Operations on the Noto Line were discontinued from 1 April 2005.

== Passenger statistics ==
In fiscal 2015, the station was used by an average of 210 passengers daily (boarding passengers only).

== Surrounding area ==
- National Route 249
- Anamizu Town Hall

== See also ==
- List of railway stations in Japan
