= Nanao Line =

Railway line in Ishikawa Prefecture, Japan

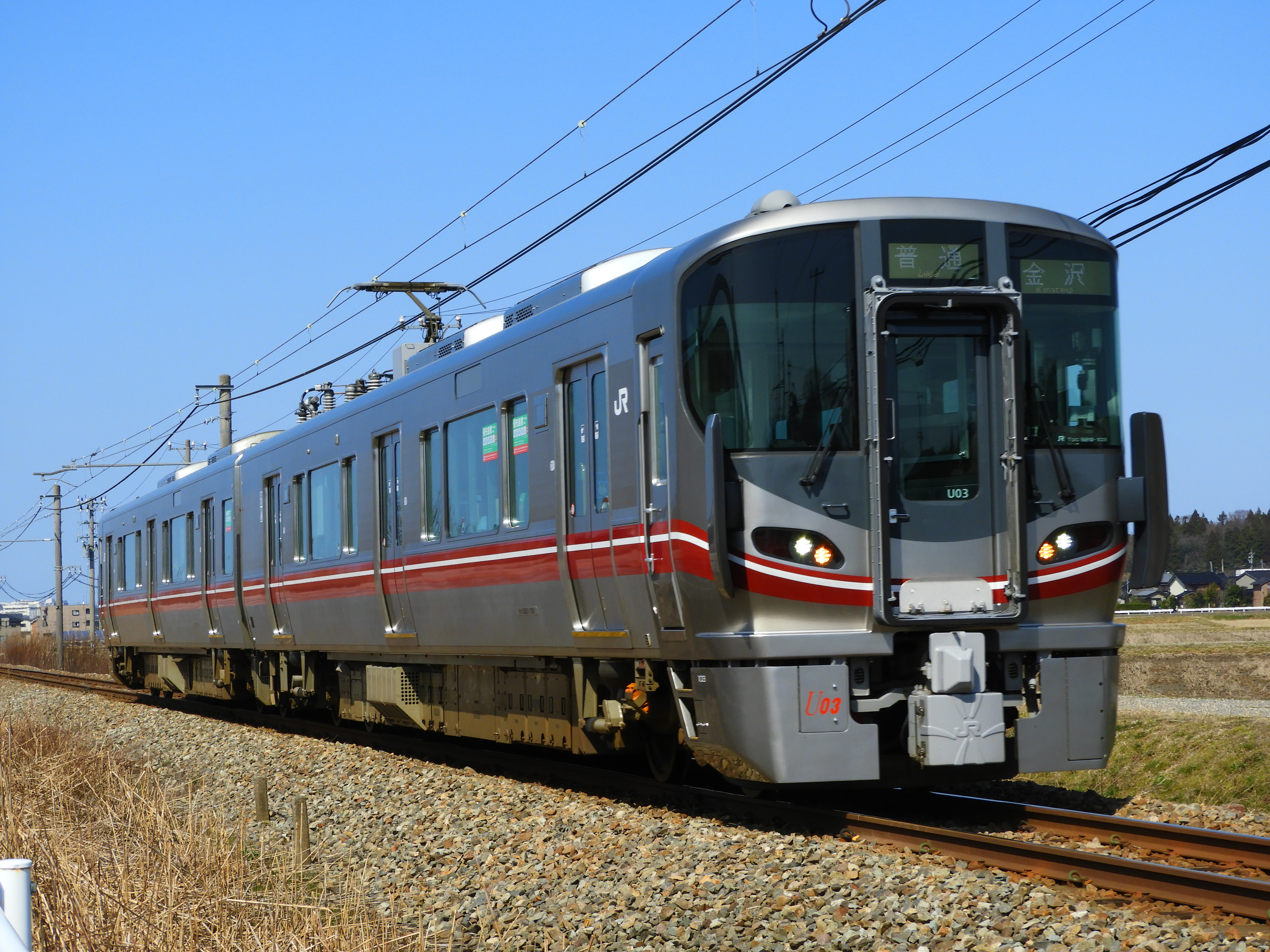
- A JR West 521-100 series EMU used on the Nanao Line

Overview
- Owner: JR West
- Locale: Ishikawa Prefecture
- Termini: Tsubata; Anamizu
- Stations: 20 (JR West), 8 (Noto Railway)

Service
- Type: Regional rail
- Operator(s): JR West, Noto Railway

History
- Opened: 1898; 128 years ago

Technical
- Line length: 59.5 km (37.0 mi) (JR West), 33.1 km (20.6 mi) (Noto Railway)
- Track length: 87.5 km (54.4 mi) (JR West)
- Track gauge: 1,067 mm (3 ft 6 in)
- Electrification: 1500 V DC (Tsubata — Wakuraonsen)
- Operating speed: 100 km/h (60 mph)
Route map
JR West

The Nanao Line (七尾線, Nanao-sen) is a railway line in Ishikawa Prefecture, Japan, operated by West Japan Railway Company (JR West) and Noto Railway. It runs between Tsubata Station in Tsubata and Anamizu Station in Anamizu.

JR West operates all services on the section between Tsubata and Nanao (with Noto Kagaribi Limited Express services continuing to Wakuraonsen), while Noto Railway (the second company with this name, see Former connecting lines section below) operates the section between Nanao and Anamizu. A further section of the line between Anamizu and Wajima closed in 2001.

Before the transfer of the Wakuraonsen — Wajima section from JR West to Noto Railway in 1991, Noto Railway took control of another former Japanese National Railways (JNR) line in 1988, the Noto Line. It closed in 2005.

In 2015, IR Ishikawa Railway took over the Hokuriku Main Line at Tsubata, effectively isolating the Nanao Line from the rest of the JR network; however, all JR West Nanao Line services operate a through service on the IR Ishikawa Railway Line to/from Kanazawa.

== JR West ==
=== Basic data ===
- Operators, distances:
  - West Japan Railway Company (Tracks)
    - Tsubata — Anamizu: 87.5 km (54.4 mi)
  - West Japan Railway Company (Services)
    - Tsubata — Wakuraonsen: 59.5 km (37.0 mi)
  - Noto Railway (Services)
    - Nanao — Wakuraonsen: 5.1 km (3.2 mi)
- Stations: 20
- Tracks: Entire line single-tracked
- Electrification: Tsubata — Wakuraonsen (1,500 V DC)
- Railway signalling:
  - Tsubata — Wakuraonsen: Simplified automatic

=== Services ===
Noto Kagaribi Limited Express operates 5 round trips per day between Kanazawa and either Nanao or Wakuraonsen.

Hanayome Noren tourist service operates between Kanazawa and Wakuraonsen using a custom-refurbished 2-car KiHa 48 DMU. Regular service was suspended following the 2024 Noto earthquake, with the service subsqeuntly only operating chartered tours.

All other trains are Local services operating between Kanazawa and Nanao, stopping at every station.

=== Stations ===
The Nanao Line is entirely within Ishikawa Prefecture.

Station	Japanese	Distance (km)		Noto Kagaribi	Transfers	Location
Station	Japanese	Between stations	Total	Noto Kagaribi	Transfers	Location
↑Through service to/from Kanazawa on the IR Ishikawa Railway Line↑
Tsubata	津幡	0.0	0.0	▲	IR Ishikawa Railway Line	Tsubata, Kahoku District
Naka-Tsubata	中津幡	1.8	1.8	｜		Tsubata, Kahoku District
Hon-Tsubata	本津幡	1.1	2.9	｜		Tsubata, Kahoku District
Nose	能瀬	2.2	5.1	｜		Tsubata, Kahoku District
Unoke	宇野気	3.7	8.8	｜		Kahoku
Yokoyama	横山	3.0	11.8	｜		Kahoku
Takamatsu	高松	2.6	14.4	▲		Kahoku
Menden	免田	3.4	17.8	｜		Hōdatsushimizu, Hakui District
Hōdatsu	宝達	3.1	20.9	｜		Hōdatsushimizu, Hakui District
Shikinami	敷浪	3.3	24.2	｜		Hōdatsushimizu, Hakui District
Minami-Hakui	南羽咋	2.5	26.7	｜		Hakui
Hakui	羽咋	3.0	29.7	●		Hakui
Chiji	千路	4.1	33.8	｜		Hakui
Kanemaru	金丸	3.7	37.5	｜		Nakanoto, Kashima District
Notobe	能登部	3.6	41.1	｜		Nakanoto, Kashima District
Yoshikawa	良川	2.8	43.9	▲		Nakanoto, Kashima District
Noto-Ninomiya	能登二宮	2.2	46.1	｜		Nakanoto, Kashima District
Tokuda	徳田	2.8	48.9	｜		Nanao
Nanao	七尾	5.5	54.4	●	Noto Railway Nanao Line	Nanao
Wakuraonsen †	和倉温泉	5.1	59.5	●	Noto Railway Nanao Line	Nanao

† JR West's Local services operate to/from Nanao. Only Noto Kagaribi Limited Express services continue to Wakuraonsen.

Noto Kagaribi stops: "●": all services stop; "▲": selected services stop; "｜": all services pass.

=== Rolling stock ===
==== Local services ====
- JR West and IR Ishikawa Railway 521-100 series 2-car EMU (Electric Multiple Unit) (from 3 October 2020)

==== Noto Kagaribi Limited Express services ====
- JR West 681 series EMU
- JR West 683 series EMU

==== Hanayome Noren Tourist service ====
- Refurbished JR West KiHa 48 2-car DMU (Diesel Multiple Unit)

== Noto Railway ==
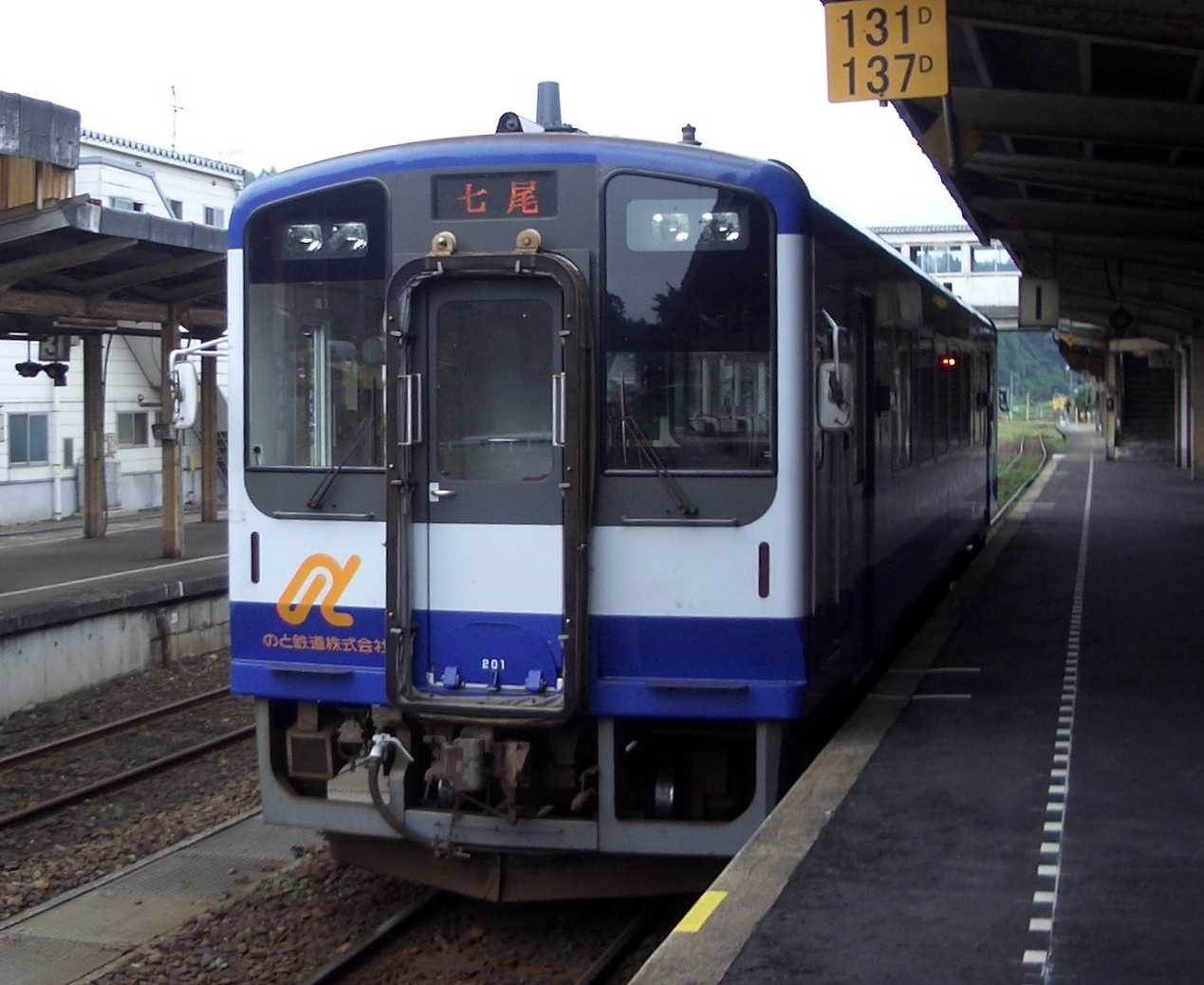
Noto Railway NT200 series DMU at Anamizu Station

The Noto Railway section is not electrified (except for the section shared with JR West) and operates local trains only. Between Nanao and Anamizu, only Noto Railway operates local trains; there is no through service to the JR West-operated part of the line south of Nanao.

In addition, のと里山里海号 (Noto Satoyama-Satoumi-go) which is a tourist train, has been run on holidays since 2017. The trains stop at all stations and seats can be reserved for 500 yen. There are also dining cars on partly services.

=== Basic data ===
- Operators, distances:
  - West Japan Railway Company (Tracks)
    - Tsubata — Anamizu: 87.5 km (54.4 mi)
  - Noto Railway (Services)
    - Nanao — Anamizu: 33.1 km (20.6 mi)
- Stations: 8
- Tracks: Entire line single-tracked
- Electrification: Nanao — Wakuraonsen (1,500 V DC)
- Railway signalling:
  - Nanao — Anamizu: Simplified automatic

=== Stations ===
The Nanao Line is entirely within Ishikawa Prefecture.

Station	Japanese	Distance (km)		Noto Satoyama-Satoumi	Transfers	Location
Station	Japanese	Between stations	Total	Noto Satoyama-Satoumi	Transfers	Location
Nanao	七尾	-	0.0	●	JR West Nanao Line	Nanao
Wakuraonsen	和倉温泉	5.1	5.1	●	JR West Nanao Line	Nanao
Tatsuruhama	田鶴浜	3.5	8.6	↕		Nanao
Kasashiho	笠師保	4.1	12.7	↕		Nanao
Noto-Nakajima	能登中島	3.6	16.3	●		Nanao
Nishigishi	西岸	6.2	22.5	↕		Nanao
Noto-Kashima	能登鹿島	4.3	26.8	↕		Anamizu, Hōsu District
Anamizu	穴水	6.3	33.1	●		Anamizu, Hōsu District

=== Noto Railway Rolling stock ===
- NT 200 series DMU (Diesel Multiple Unit)
- NT 300 series DMU

== History ==
The section between Tsubata Station (now Hon-Tsubata Station) and Yatashin Station (later renamed Nanaominato Station and closed in 1984) via Nanao Station was constructed and opened by the Nanao Railway (七尾鉄道, Nanao-tetsudō) on April 24, 1898. The terminal in Tsubata was moved to the present Tsubata Station on August 2, 1900, and connected to the government-owned Hokuriku Main Line. Nanao Railway was nationalized on September 1, 1907.

The line was extended and had been operated by the Japanese Government Railways. In 1925, the Nanao to Wakura (now Wakuraonsen) section opened, and in 1935 the line was completed with the opening of the Anamizu to Wajima section. In 1991, the Nanao Line was electrified to Wakuraonsen, enabling through operation of trains from the Hokuriku Main Line. Operation of the Nanao to Wajima section was transferred to the Noto Railway. In 2001, the section between Anamizu and Wajima was closed.

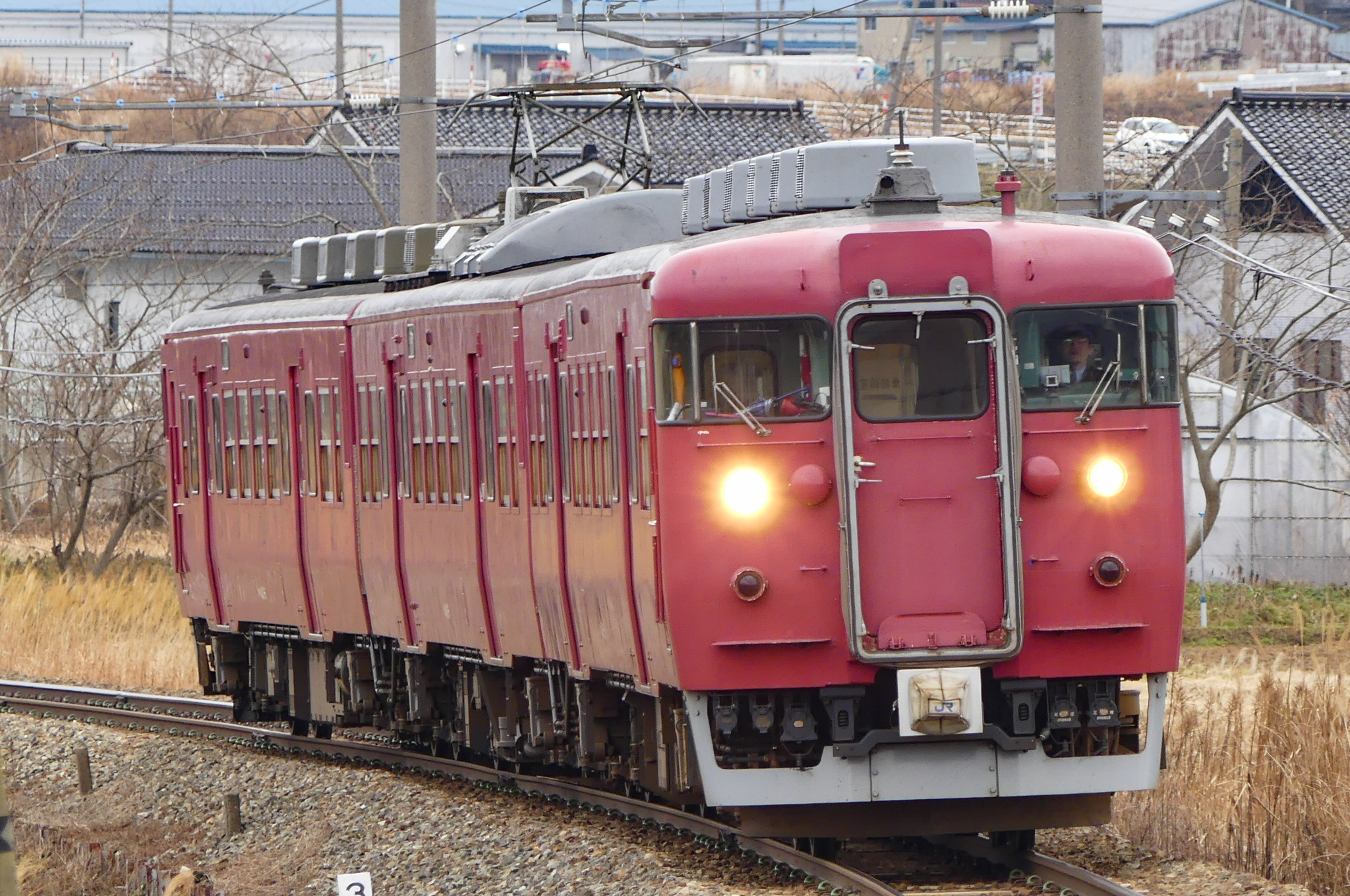
A JR 413 series train on the Notoninomiya station in January 2018

== See also ==
- List of railway companies in Japan
- List of railway lines in Japan
