= Nanao Station =

Railway station in Nanao, Ishikawa Prefecture, Japan

Nanao Station 七尾駅
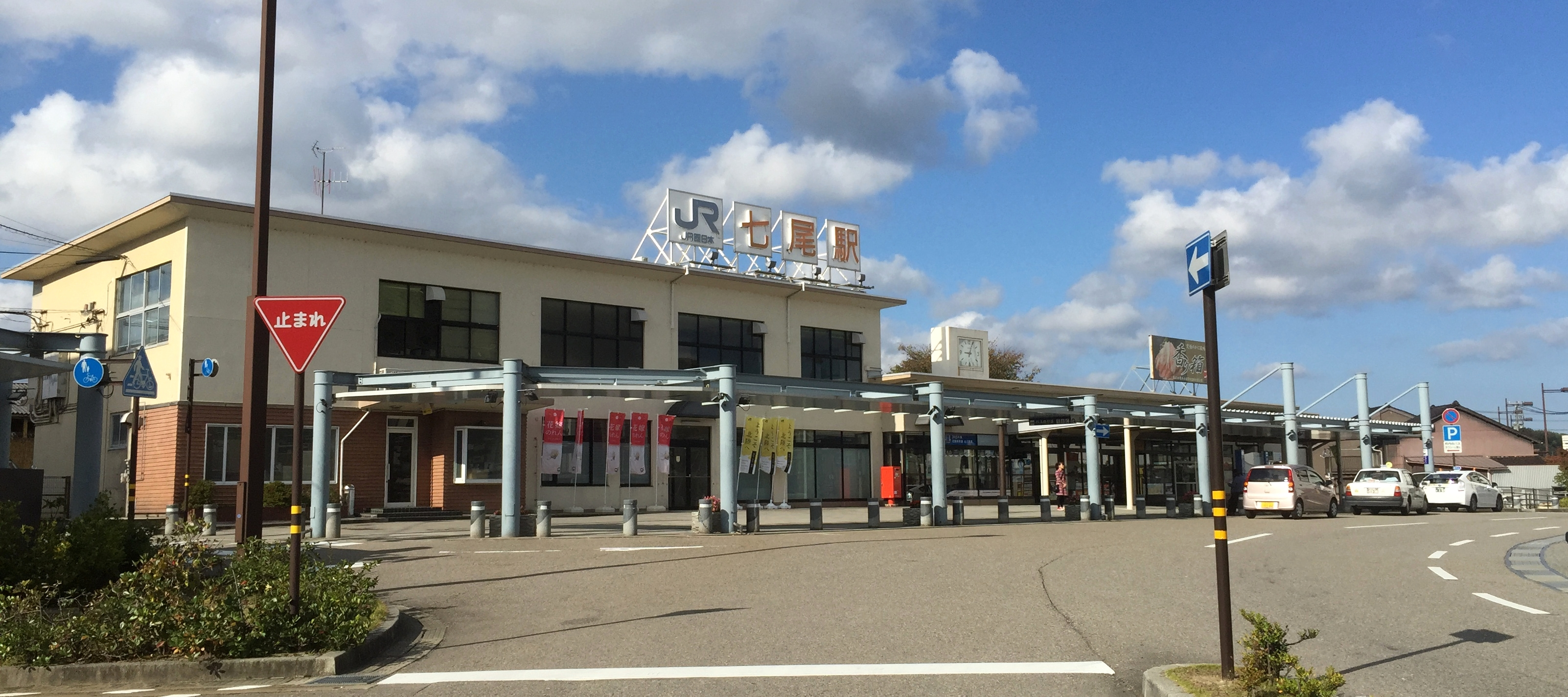
- Nanao Station in October 2015

General information
- Location: 28-2 Misogi-cho, Nanao City, Ishikawa Prefecture 926-0811; Japan
- Coordinates: 37.042384°N 136.963999°E
- Operator: JR West; Noto Railway
- Lines: JR Nanao Line; Nanao Line
- Distance: 54.4 km (33.8 mi) from Tsubata
- Platforms: 1 island + 2 side platforms
- Tracks: 4

Construction
- Structure type: At grade

Other information
- Status: Staffed (Midori no Madoguchi )
- Website: Official website

History
- Opened: 24 April 1898; 128 years ago

Passengers
- FY2019: 1,114 (JR West) daily; 366 (Noto Railway) daily

Services
Preceding station	JR West	Following station
Tokuda towards Tsubata	JR Nanao Line	Wakura-Onsen Terminus
Preceding station	Noto Railway	Following station
Terminus	Nanao Line	Wakura-Onsen towards Anamizu
Location
- Location within Ishikawa Prefecture Location within Chubu region Location within Japan

Nanao Station (七尾駅, Nanao-eki) is a railway station in the city of Nanao, Ishikawa, Japan, jointly operated by the West Japan Railway Company (JR West) and the private railway operator Noto Railway.

== Lines ==
Nanao Station is served by the Nanao Line, and is located 54.4 kilometers from the end of the line at Tsubata. It is also the terminal station for the 6.3 kilometer Noto Railway's Nanao Line to Anamizu.

== Station layout ==
The station consists of one ground-level side platform and two staggered and co-joined side platforms. The platforms are connected by a footbridge. The station has a Midori no Madoguchi staffed ticket office.

=== Platforms ===
1	■ Nanao Line	for Tsubata and Kanazawa for Wakura-Onsen (express only)
2	■ Nanao Line	for Tsubata and Kanazawa
3	■ Nanao Line	for Wakura-Onsen

0	■ Nanao Railway	for Wakura-Onsen

== History ==
The station opened on April 24, 1898. With the privatization of Japanese National Railways (JNR) on 1 April 1987, the station came under the control of JR West.

== Passenger statistics ==
In fiscal 2015, the JR West portion of the station was used by an average of 1,138 passengers daily and the Noto Railway portion of the station was used by an average of 476 passengers daily (boarding passengers only).

== Surrounding area ==
- Nanao City Hall
- Ishikawa Nanao Art Museum
- Nanao High School

== See also ==
- List of railway stations in Japan
