= Menden Station =

Railway station in Hōdatsushimizu, Ishikawa Prefecture, Japan

Menden Station 免田駅
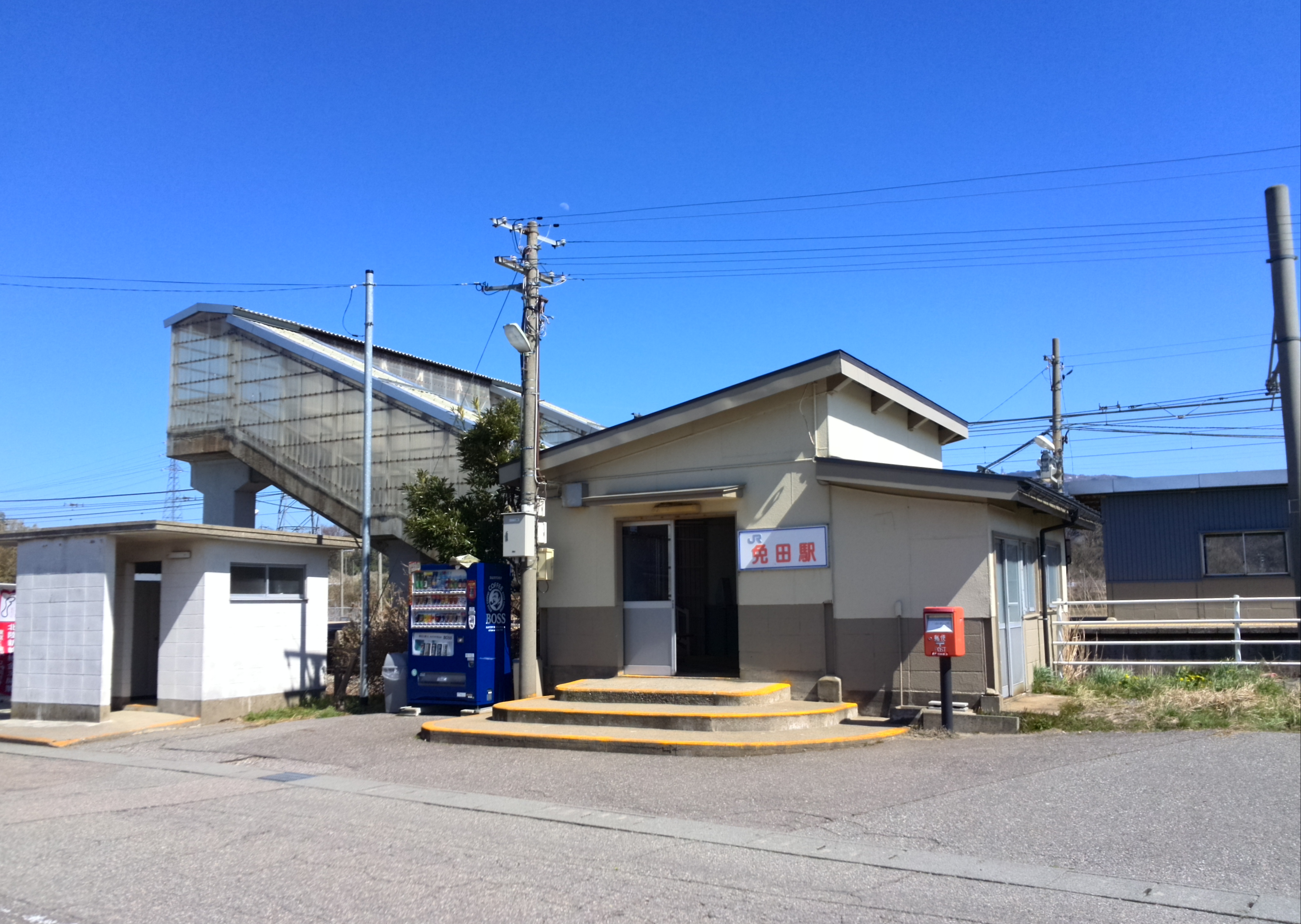
- Menden Station in March 2015

General information
- Location: 106 Menden, Hōdatsushimizu-machi, Hakui-gun, Ishikawa-ken 929-1333; Japan
- Coordinates: 36°47′45″N 136°44′51″E
- Operator: JR West
- Line: ■ Nanao Line
- Distance: 17.8 km from Tsubata
- Platforms: 1 island platform
- Tracks: 2

Construction
- Structure type: At grade

Other information
- Status: Unstaffed
- Website: Official website

History
- Opened: 1 May 1950
Location
- Location within Japan

Menden Station (免田駅, Menden-eki) is a railway station in the town of Hōdatsushimizu in Ishikawa Prefecture, Japan. The station serves the JR Nanao Line operated by the West Japan Railway Company (JR West). In 2024, ticket machines were removed at the unmanned station.

== Lines ==
Menden Station is served by the Nanao Line, and is located 17.8 kilometers from the end of the line at Tsubata and 29.3 kilometers from Kanazawa.

== Station layout ==
The station consists of one ground-level island platform connected to the station building by a footbridge. The station is unattended.

=== Platforms ===
station side	■ Nanao Line	for Hakui and Nanao
opposote side	■ Nanao Line	for Tsubata and Kanazawa

== Adjacent stations ==
«	Service	»
Nanao Line
Takamatsu	-	Hōdatsu

== History ==
The station opened on May 1, 1950. With the privatization of Japanese National Railways (JNR) on April 1, 1987, the station came under the control of JR West.

== Surrounding area ==
- National Route 159
- National Route 249
- Dai-ichi Elementary School

== See also ==
- List of railway stations in Japan
