= Hōdatsu Station =

Railway station in Hōdatsushimizu, Ishikawa Prefecture, Japan

Hōdatsu Station 宝達駅
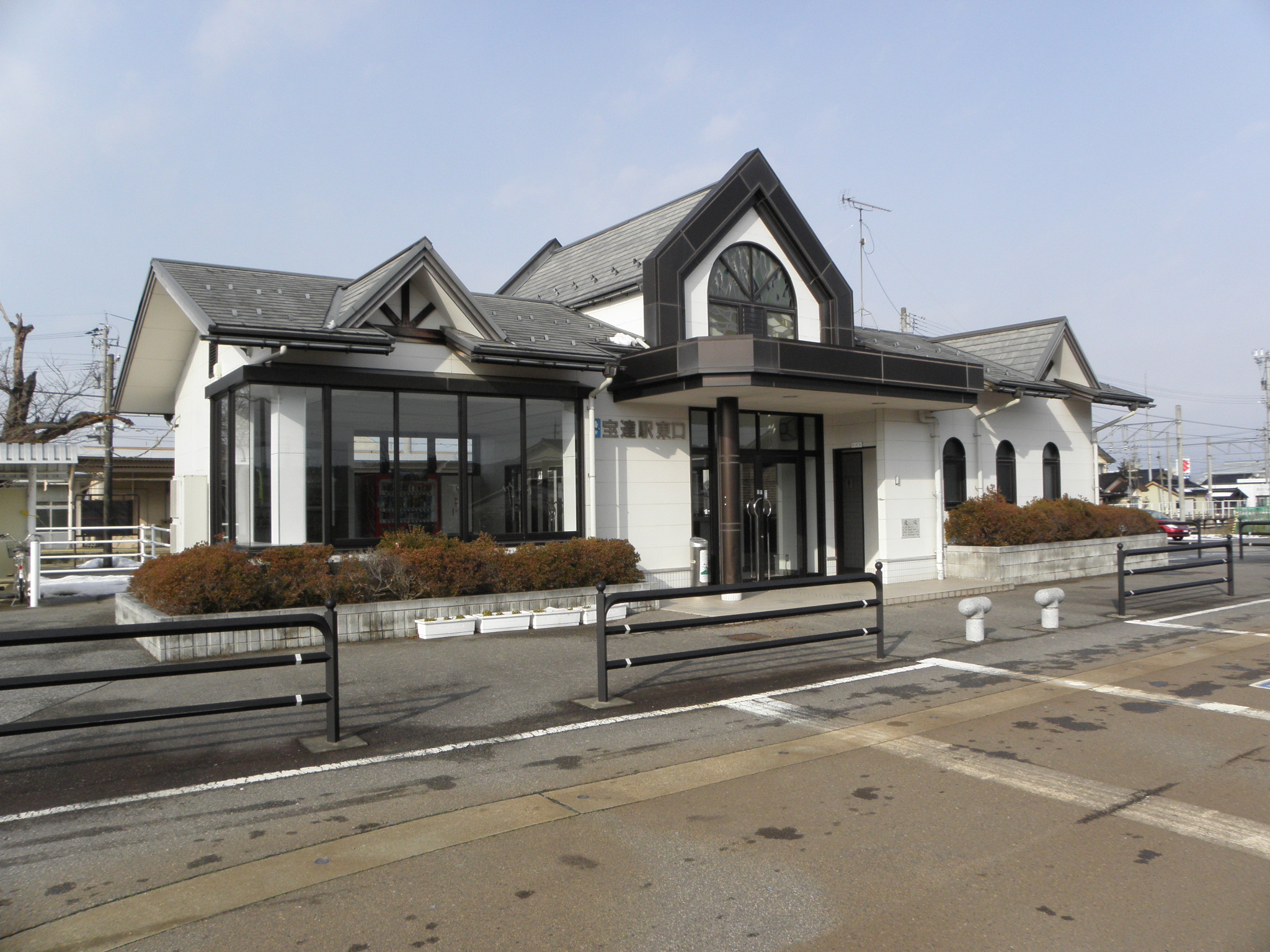
- Hōdatsu Station in January 2010

General information
- Location: 14 Ogawa, Hōdatsushimizu-machi, Hakui-gun, Ishikawa-ken 929-1343; Japan
- Coordinates: 36.8200°N 136.7622°E
- Operator: JR West
- Line: ■ Nanao Line
- Distance: 20.9 km from Tsubata
- Platforms: 2 side platforms
- Tracks: 2

Construction
- Structure type: At grade

Other information
- Status: Staffed
- Website: Official website

History
- Opened: 24 April 1898

Passengers
- FY2015: 388 daily
Location
- Location within Japan

Hōdatsu Station (宝達駅, Hōdatsu-eki) is a railway station on the Nanao Line in the town of Hōdatsushimizu, Hakui District, Ishikawa Prefecture, Japan, operated by the West Japan Railway Company (JR West).

== Lines ==
Hōdatsu Station is served by the Nanao Line, and is located 20.9 kilometers from the end of the line at Tsubata and 32.4 kilometers from Kanazawa.

== Station layout ==
The station consists of two opposed ground-level side platforms connected by a footbridge. The station is attended.

=== Platforms ===
1	■ Nanao Line	for Hakui and Nanao
2	■ Nanao Line	for Tsubata and Kanazawa

== Adjacent stations ==
«	Service	»
Nanao Line
Menden	-	Shikinami

== History ==
The station opened on April 24, 1898. With the privatization of Japanese National Railways (JNR) on April 1, 1987, the station came under the control of JR West.

== Passenger statistics ==
In fiscal 2015, the station was used by an average of 388 passengers daily (boarding passengers only).

== Surrounding area ==
- National Route 159
- National Route 249
- Hōdatsu High School

== See also ==
- List of railway stations in Japan
