= Takamatsu Station (Ishikawa) =

Railway station in Kahoku, Ishikawa Prefecture, Japan

Takamatsu Station 高松駅
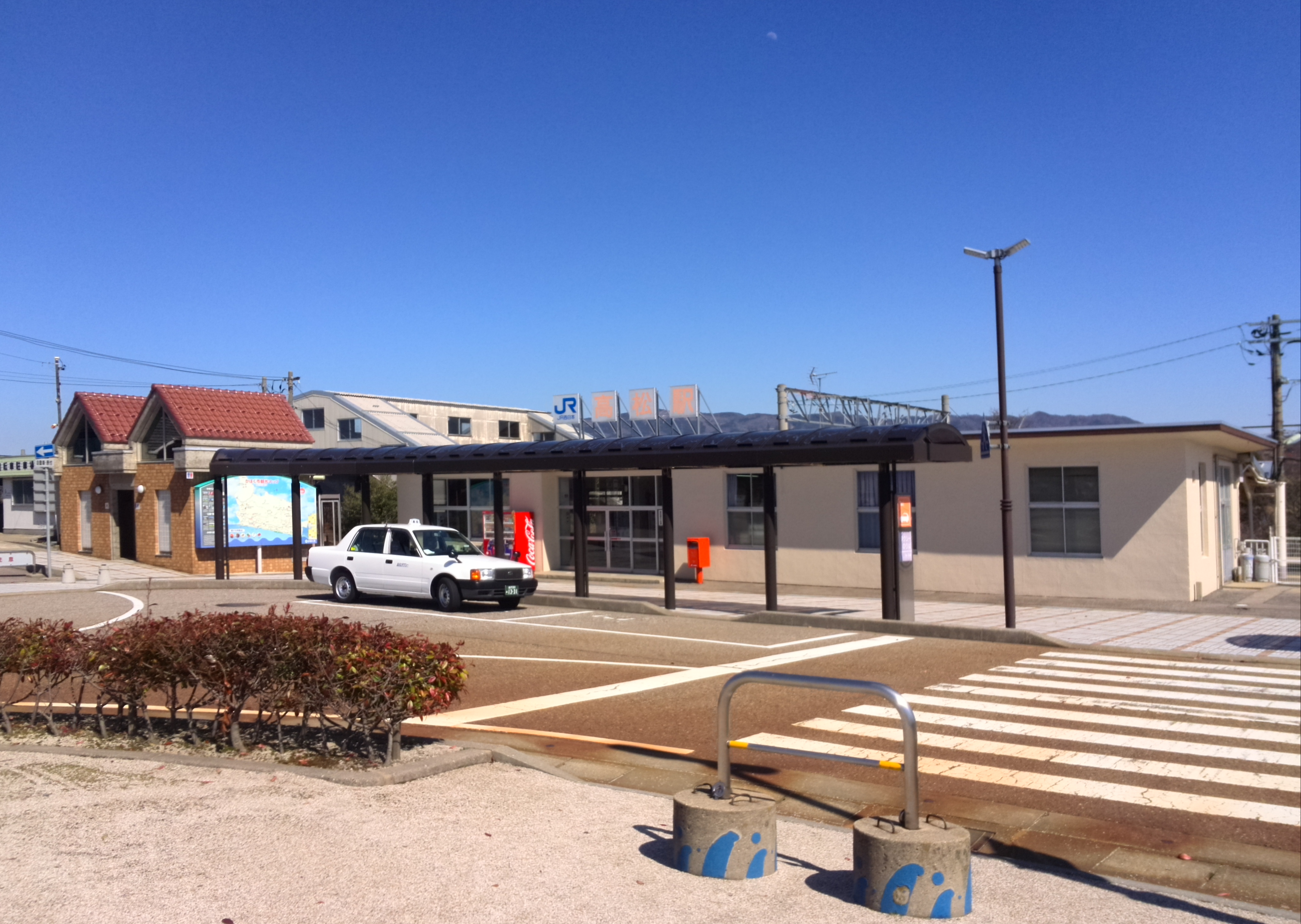
- Takamatsu Station in March 2015

General information
- Location: 42 Uchi-Takamatsu, Kahoku-shi, Ishikawa-ken 929-1215; Japan
- Coordinates: 36°46′07″N 136°43′44″E
- Operator: JR West
- Line: ■ Nanao Line
- Distance: 14.4 km from Tsubata
- Platforms: 1 side + 1 island platform
- Tracks: 3

Construction
- Structure type: At grade

Other information
- Status: Unstaffed station (automatic ticket vending machine installed)
- Website: Official website

History
- Opened: 24 April 1898

Passengers
- FY2015: 565 daily
Location
- Location within Japan

Takamatsu Station (高松駅, Takamatsu-eki) is a railway station on the Nanao Line in the city of Kahoku, Ishikawa Prefecture, Japan, operated by the West Japan Railway Company (JR West).

== Lines ==
Takamatsu Station is served by the Nanao Line, and is located 14.4 kilometers from the end of the line at Tsubata and 25.9 kilometers from Kanazawa.

== Station layout ==
The station consists of one side platform and one island platform connected by a footbridge. The station is unstaffed.

=== Platforms ===
1	■ Nanao Line	for Hakui and Nanao
2, 3	■ Nanao Line	for Tsubata and Kanazawa

== Adjacent stations ==
«	Service	»
Nanao Line
Yokoyama	-	Menden

== History ==
The station opened on April 24, 1898. With the privatization of the JNR on April 1, 1987, the station came under the control of JR West.

== Passenger statistics ==
In the 2015 fiscal year, the station was used by an average of 565 passengers daily (boarding passengers only).

== Surrounding area ==
- National Route 159
- Ishikawa Prefectural Nursing University

== See also ==
- List of railway stations in Japan
