= Minami-Hakui Station =

Railway station in Hakui, Ishikawa Prefecture, Japan

Minami-Hakui Station 南羽咋駅
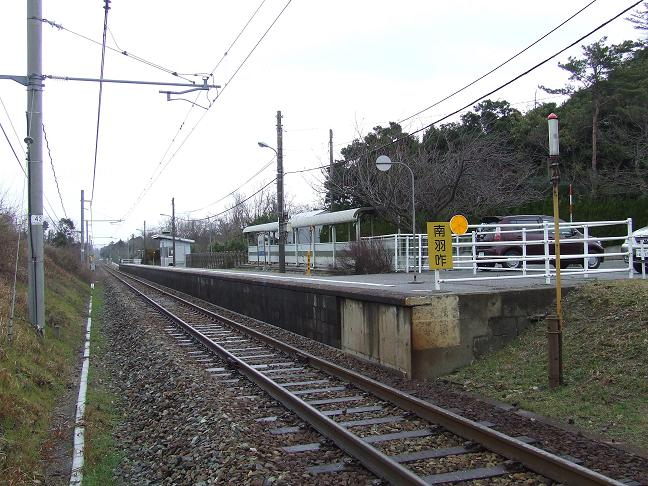
- Minami-Hakui Station in June 2009

General information
- Location: Shinpo-machi, Hakui-shi, Ishikawa-ken 925-0044; Japan
- Coordinates: 36.8703°N 136.7746°E
- Operator: JR West
- Line: ■ Nanao Line
- Distance: 26.7 km from Tsubata
- Platforms: 1 side platform
- Tracks: 1

Construction
- Structure type: At grade

Other information
- Status: Unstaffed
- Website: Official website

History
- Opened: 10 February 1960

Services
Preceding station	JR West	Following station
Hakui towards Tsubata	JR Nanao Line Local	Shikinami towards Wakura-Onsen
Location
- Location within Japan

Minami-Hakui Station (南羽咋駅, Minami-Hakui-eki) is a railway station on the Nanao Line in the city of Hakui, Ishikawa Prefecture, Japan, operated by the West Japan Railway Company (JR West).

== Lines ==
Minami-Hakui Station is served by the Nanao Line, and is located 26.7 kilometers from the end of the line at Tsubata and 38.2 kilometers from Kanazawa.

== Station layout ==
The station consists of one side platform serving a single bi-directional track. The station is unattended.

== History ==
The station opened on February 10, 1960. With the privatization of Japanese National Railways (JNR) on April 1, 1987, the station came under the control of JR West.

== Surrounding area ==
- National Route 249
- National Route 159

== See also ==
- List of railway stations in Japan
