= Hon-Tsubata Station =

Railway station in Tsubata, Ishikawa Prefecture, Japan

Hon-Tsubata Station 本津幡駅
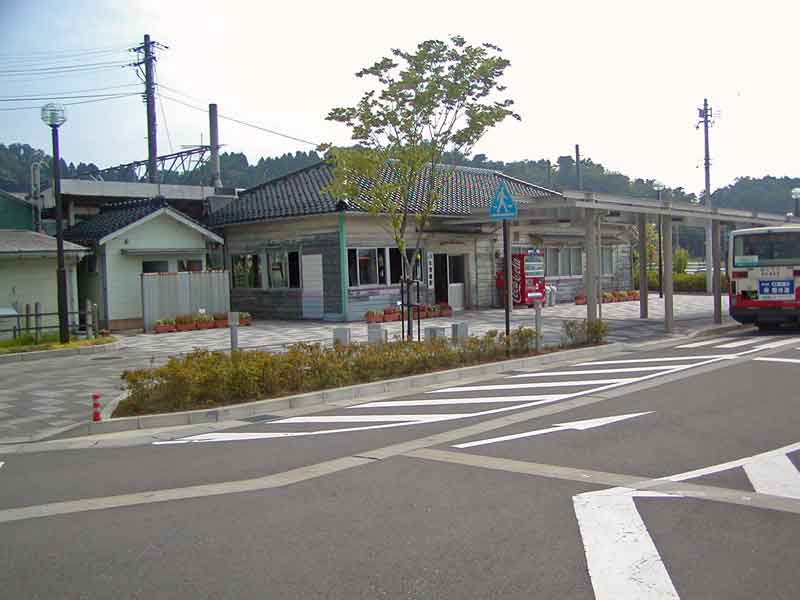
- Hon-Tsubata Station in August 2008

General information
- Location: 7 Shimizu, Tsubata-machi, Kahoku-gun, Ishikawa-ken 929-0326; Japan
- Coordinates: 36.6765°N 136.7324°E
- Operator: JR West
- Line: ■ Nanao Line
- Distance: 2.9 km from Tsubata
- Platforms: 2 side platforms
- Tracks: 2

Construction
- Structure type: At grade

Other information
- Status: Staffed
- Website: Official website

History
- Opened: 25 June 1902

Passengers
- FY2015: 453 daily
Location
- Location within Japan

Hon-Tsubata Station (本津幡駅, Hon-Tsubata-eki) is a railway station on the Nanao Line in the town of Tsubata, Kahoku District, Ishikawa Prefecture, Japan, operated by the West Japan Railway Company (JR West).

== Lines ==
Hon-Tsubata Station is served by the Nanao Line, and is located 2.9 kilometers from the end of the line at Tsubata and 14.4 kilometers from Kanazawa.

== Station layout ==
The station consists of two unnumbered opposed side platforms connected by a footbridge. The station is attended.

=== Platforms ===
station side	■ Nanao Line	for Hakui and Nanao
opposite side	■ Nanao Line	for Tsubata and Kanazawa

== Adjacent stations ==
«	Service	»
Nanao Line
Naka-Tsubata	-	Nose

== History ==
The station opened on June 25, 1902, although a provisional stop had existed at this location since the opening of the Nanao Line on April 24, 1898. With the privatization of Japanese National Railways (JNR) on April 1, 1987, the station came under the control of JR West.

== Passenger statistics ==
In fiscal 2015, the station was used by an average of 453 passengers daily (boarding passengers only).

== Surrounding area ==
- Tsubata Elementary School
- Katsuzakikan, Japanese style inn

== See also ==
- List of railway stations in Japan
