= Nose Station =

Railway station in Tsubata, Ishikawa Prefecture, Japan

Nose Station 能瀬駅
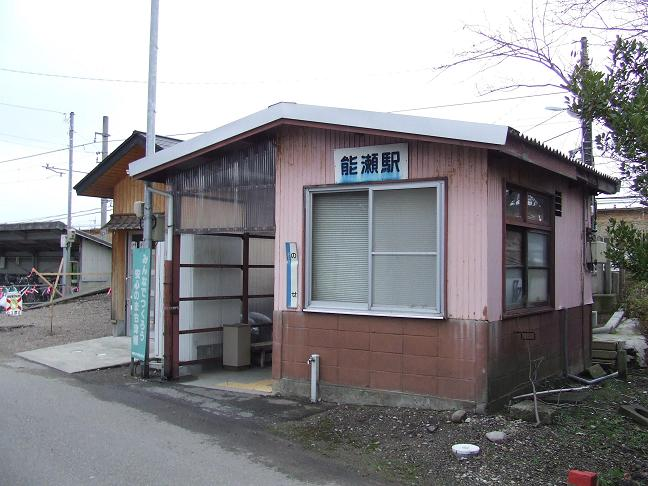
- Nose Station in June 2009

General information
- Location: 109 Nose, Tsubata-machi, Kahoku-gun, Ishikawa-ken 929-0319; Japan
- Coordinates: 36.6930°N 136.7200°E
- Operator: JR West
- Line: ■ Nanao Line
- Distance: 5.1 km from Tsubata
- Platforms: 1 side platform
- Tracks: 1

Construction
- Structure type: At grade

Other information
- Status: Unstaffed
- Website: Official website

History
- Opened: 10 February 1960
Location
- Location within Japan

Nose Station (能瀬駅, Nose-eki) is a railway station on the Nanao Line in the town of Tsubata, Kahoku District, Ishikawa Prefecture, Japan, operated by the West Japan Railway Company (JR West).

== Lines ==
Nose Station is served by the Nanao Line, and is located 5.1 kilometers from the end of the line at Tsubata and 16.6 kilometers from Kanazawa.

== Station layout ==
The station consists of one ground-level side platform serving a single bi-directional track. The station is unattended.

== Adjacent stations ==
«	Service	»
Nanao Line
Hon-Tsubata	-	Unoke

== History ==
The station opened on February 10, 1960. With the privatization of Japanese National Railways (JNR) on April 1, 1987, the station came under the control of JR West.

== Surrounding area ==
- National Route 159

== See also ==
- List of railway stations in Japan
