= Yokoyama Station (Ishikawa) =

Railway station in Kahoku, Ishikawa Prefecture, Japan

Yokoyama Station 横山駅
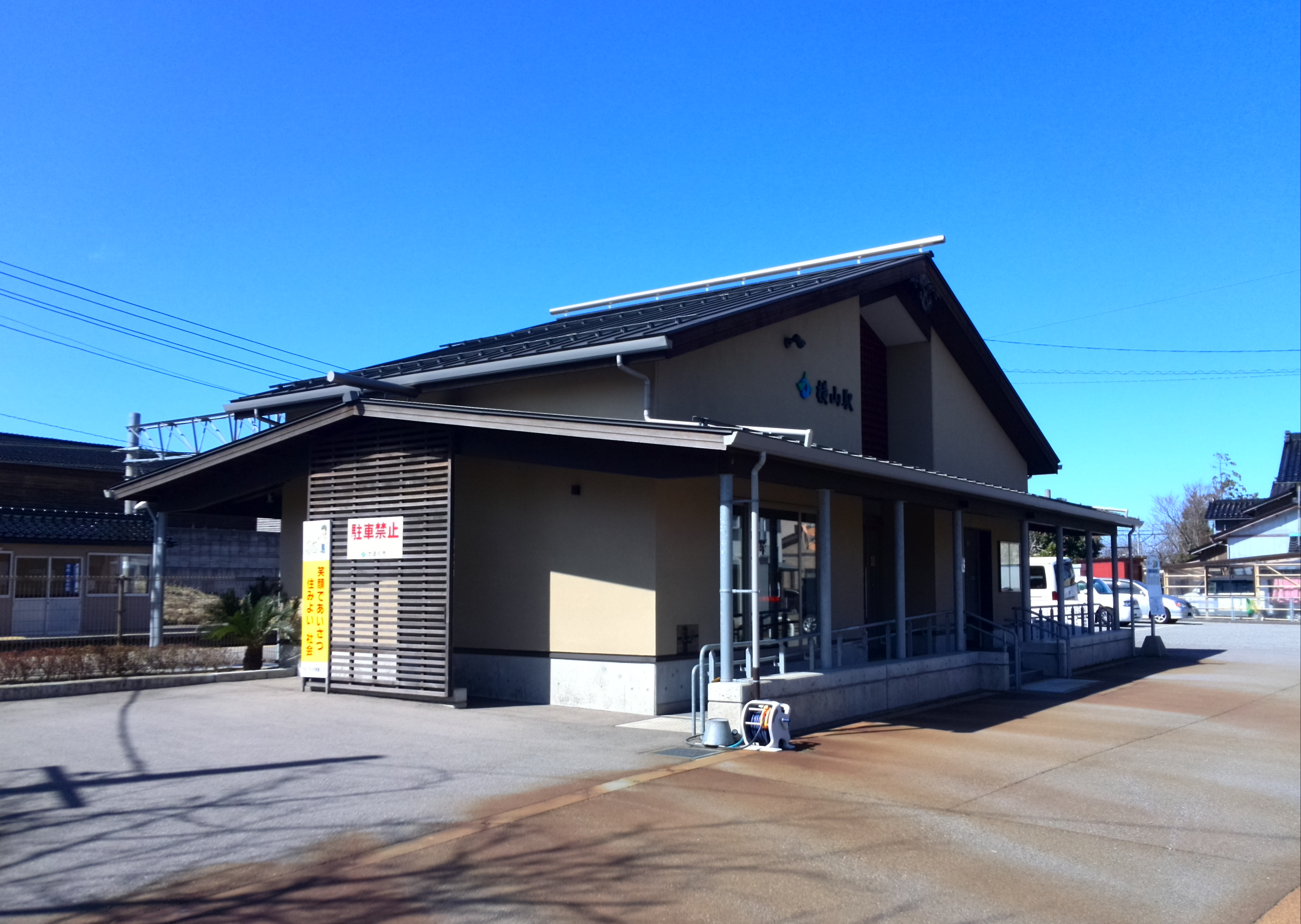
- Yokoyama Station in March 2015

General information
- Location: 77 Yokohama-i, Kahoku-shi, Ishikawa-ken 929-1105; Japan
- Coordinates: 36°44′51″N 136°43′01″E
- Operator: JR West
- Line: ■ Nanao Line
- Distance: 11.8 km from Tsubata
- Platforms: 2 side platforms
- Tracks: 2

Construction
- Structure type: At grade

Other information
- Status: Unstaffed
- Website: Official website

History
- Opened: 16 June 1901
Location
- Location within Japan

Yokoyama Station (横山駅, Yokoyama-eki) is a railway station on the Nanao Line in the city of Kahoku, Ishikawa Prefecture, Japan, operated by the West Japan Railway Company (JR West).

== Lines ==
Yokoyama Station is served by the Nanao Line, and is located 11.8 kilometers from the end of the line at Tsubata and 23.3 kilometers from Kanazawa.

== Station layout ==
The station consists of two opposed unnumbered side platforms connected by a footbridge. The station is unattended.

=== Platforms ===
station side	■ Nanao Line	for Tsubata and Kanazawa
opposite side	■ Nanao Line	for Hakui and Nanao

== Adjacent stations ==
«	Service	»
Nanao Line
Unoke	-	Takamatsu

== History ==
The station opened on June 15, 1901. With the privatization of Japanese National Railways (JNR) on April 1, 1987, the station came under the control of JR West. The station building was rebuilt in 2010.

== Surrounding area ==
- National Route 159
- Kanatsu Elementary School

== See also ==
- List of railway stations in Japan
