= Hakui, Ishikawa =

Hakui 羽咋市
- City
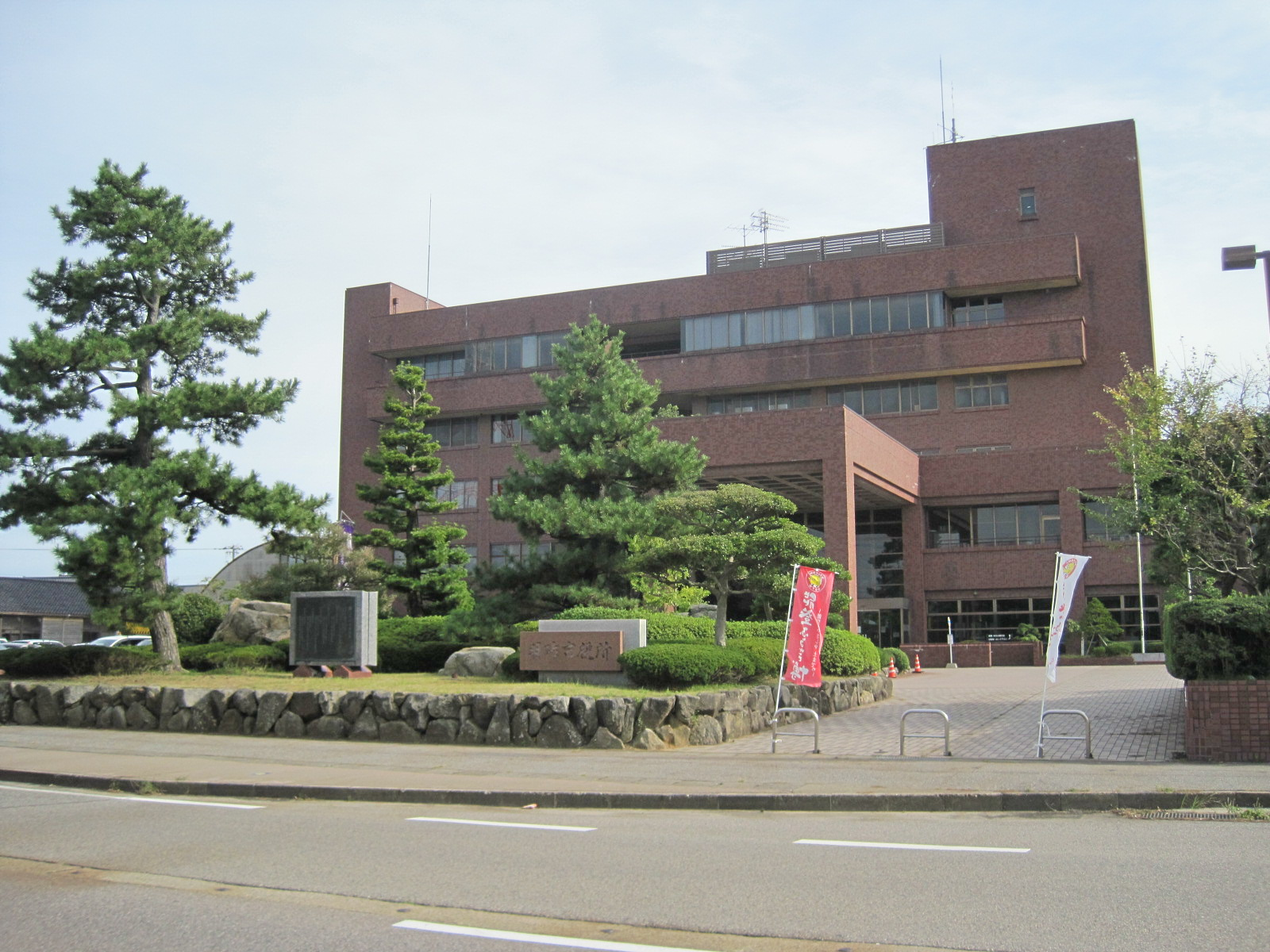
- Hakui City Hall

- Flag Emblem

- Location of Hakui in Ishikawa Prefecture

- Coordinates: 36°53′37″N 136°46′44.3″E
- Country: Japan
- Region: Chūbu (Hokuriku)
- Prefecture: Ishikawa Prefecture

Government
  - - Mayor: Yoshinobu Yamabe

Area
  - Total: 81.85 km^{2} (31.60 sq mi)

Population (February 1, 2018)
  - Total: 22,052
  - Density: 269.4/km^{2} (697.8/sq mi)
- Time zone: UTC+9 (Japan Standard Time)
- Phone number: 0767-22-1111
- Address: Asahimachi-A 200, Hakui-shi, Ishikawa-ken 925-8501
- Climate: Cfa
- Website: www.city.hakui.ishikawa.jp
- Symbols
- Bird: Swan
- Flower: Zelkova serrata
- Tree: Pinus thunbergii

Hakui (羽咋市, Hakui-shi) is a city located in Ishikawa Prefecture, Japan. As of 1 February 2018, the city had an estimated population of 22,052 in 8566 households, and a population density of 270 persons per km². The total area of the city was 81.85 square kilometres (31.60 sq mi).

== Geography ==
Hakui occupies the southwestern neck of Noto Peninsula and is bordered by the Sea of Japan on west, and Toyama Prefecture to the east. Parts of the city are within the borders of the Noto Hantō Quasi-National Park.

=== Neighbouring municipalities ===
- Ishikawa Prefecture
  - Hōdatsushimizu
  - Nakanoto
  - Shika
- Toyama Prefecture
  - Himi

=== Climate ===
Hakui has a humid subtropical climate (Köppen Cfa) characterized by mild summers and cold winters with heavy snowfall. The average annual temperature in Hakui is 13.9 °C. The average annual rainfall is 2452 mm with September as the wettest month. The temperatures are highest on average in August, at around 26.4 °C, and lowest in January, at around 4.0 °C.

Climate data for Hakui (1991−2020 normals, extremes 1978−present)
Month	Jan	Feb	Mar	Apr	May	Jun	Jul	Aug	Sep	Oct	Nov	Dec	Year
Record high °C (°F)	18.1 (64.6)	21.9 (71.4)	25.6 (78.1)	29.9 (85.8)	31.6 (88.9)	34.4 (93.9)	36.7 (98.1)	39.6 (103.3)	38.1 (100.6)	32.3 (90.1)	26.7 (80.1)	22.1 (71.8)	39.6 (103.3)
Mean daily maximum °C (°F)	6.8 (44.2)	7.3 (45.1)	10.7 (51.3)	16.0 (60.8)	21.0 (69.8)	24.6 (76.3)	28.4 (83.1)	30.5 (86.9)	26.6 (79.9)	21.2 (70.2)	15.5 (59.9)	9.9 (49.8)	18.2 (64.8)
Daily mean °C (°F)	3.5 (38.3)	3.6 (38.5)	6.5 (43.7)	11.5 (52.7)	16.6 (61.9)	20.7 (69.3)	24.8 (76.6)	26.5 (79.7)	22.4 (72.3)	16.9 (62.4)	11.3 (52.3)	6.3 (43.3)	14.2 (57.6)
Mean daily minimum °C (°F)	0.5 (32.9)	0.2 (32.4)	2.3 (36.1)	7.1 (44.8)	12.5 (54.5)	17.4 (63.3)	21.9 (71.4)	23.1 (73.6)	18.9 (66.0)	12.8 (55.0)	7.2 (45.0)	2.8 (37.0)	10.6 (51.0)
Record low °C (°F)	−6.5 (20.3)	−6.5 (20.3)	−4.5 (23.9)	−1.3 (29.7)	3.1 (37.6)	9.5 (49.1)	15.3 (59.5)	16.0 (60.8)	9.4 (48.9)	3.5 (38.3)	−0.1 (31.8)	−4.2 (24.4)	−6.5 (20.3)
Average precipitation mm (inches)	212.7 (8.37)	129.6 (5.10)	129.3 (5.09)	122.5 (4.82)	127.4 (5.02)	156.4 (6.16)	225.8 (8.89)	188.7 (7.43)	195.3 (7.69)	153.1 (6.03)	205.3 (8.08)	264.6 (10.42)	2,110.7 (83.10)
Average precipitation days (≥ 1.0 mm)	23.7	18.3	15.8	11.9	10.6	10.9	12.3	9.3	11.7	12.9	16.9	23.4	177.7
Mean monthly sunshine hours	55.8	90.8	154.1	194.5	215.8	171.7	171.1	219.5	160.1	157.2	108.4	62.2	1,767.2
Source: Japan Meteorological Agency

== Demographics ==
Per Japanese census data, the population of Hakui has declined over the past 40 years.

Historical population
Year	Pop.	±%
1970	28,530	—
1980	28,784	+0.9%
1990	27,517	−4.4%
2000	25,541	−7.2%
2010	23,032	−9.8%
2020	20,407	−11.4%

== History ==
The area around Hakui has been settled since the pre-Jōmon period was part of ancient Noto Province. The ichinomiya of Noto province, Keta Taisha is located in Hakui, and shrine legend asserts that this is the location at which Ōkuninushi landed with 300 of his folders from Izumo to subdue the inhabitants of Noto Peninsula during the reign of the demi-legendary 8th Emperor Kōgen or 10th Emperor Sujin. The name of "Hakui" is derived from the kanji 羽 (ha), meaning feathers, and 咋 (kui) meaning "to eat". This name comes from an ancient legend which tells of Prince Iwatsuku (the son of Emperor Kōgen) killing a monstrous bird which plagued the area. The Prince's dogs went to the beast's body and pulled away mouthfuls of feathers.

During the Sengoku Period the area was contested by the Uesugi clan and Maeda clan. The area became part Kaga Domain under the Edo period Tokugawa shogunate. Following the Meiji restoration, the area was organised into Hakui District, Ishikawa.

The town of Hakui was established with the creation of the modern municipalities system on April 1, 1889. It was raised to city status on July 1, 1958.

== Government ==
Hakui has a mayor-council form of government with a directly elected mayor and a unicameral city legislature of 14 members.

== Economy ==
Hakui is a regional commercial centre for the southern Noto area. Hakui is noted for its silk and artificial textile production. Agriculture is also a major contributor to the local economy.

== Education ==
Hakui has six public elementary schools and two middle schools operated by the city government, and three public high school operated by the Ishikawa Prefectural Board of Education.

== Transportation ==
=== Railway ===
West Japan Railway Company - Nanao Line

- Minami-Hakui - Hakui - Chiji

=== Highway ===
National Route 159
National Route 249
National Route 415
National Route 470

== Sister cities ==
- Tongzhou District, Nantong, Jiangsu, China, friendship city since May 22, 2001

== Local attractions ==
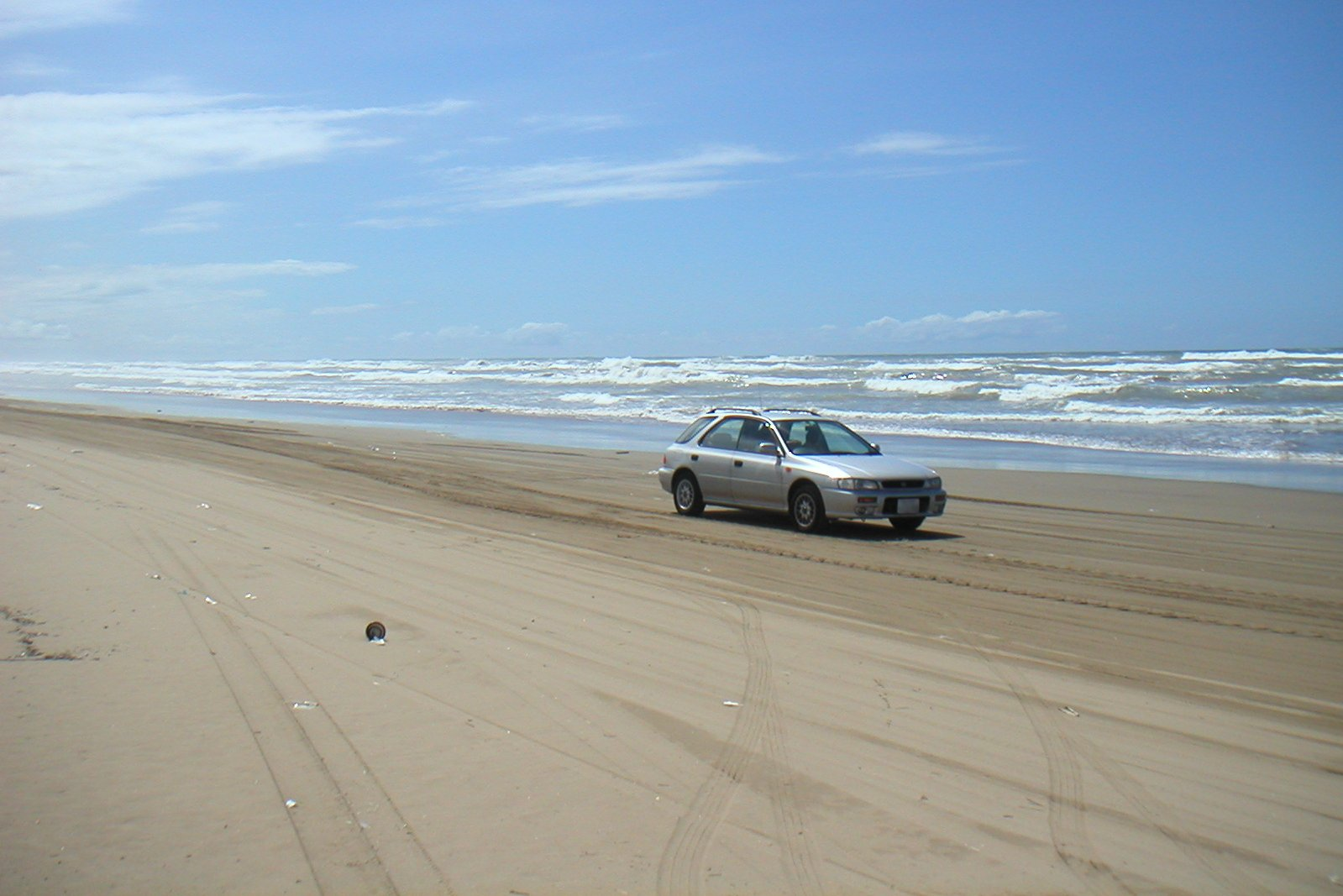
Chirihama Nagisa Driveway in Hakui

- Chirihama Nagisa Driveway
- Keta Taisha, ichinomiya of Noto province
- Space and UFO Museum Cosmo Isle Hakui (Hakui claims to be the UFO sighting capital of Japan. This is reflected in a number of places around the city, including a UFO shaped street light at the entrance to Hakui Station, and plaques depicting UFOs in the pavement outside the city hall)
