= Notobe Station =

Railway station in Nakanoto, Ishikawa Prefecture, Japan

Notobe Station 能登部駅
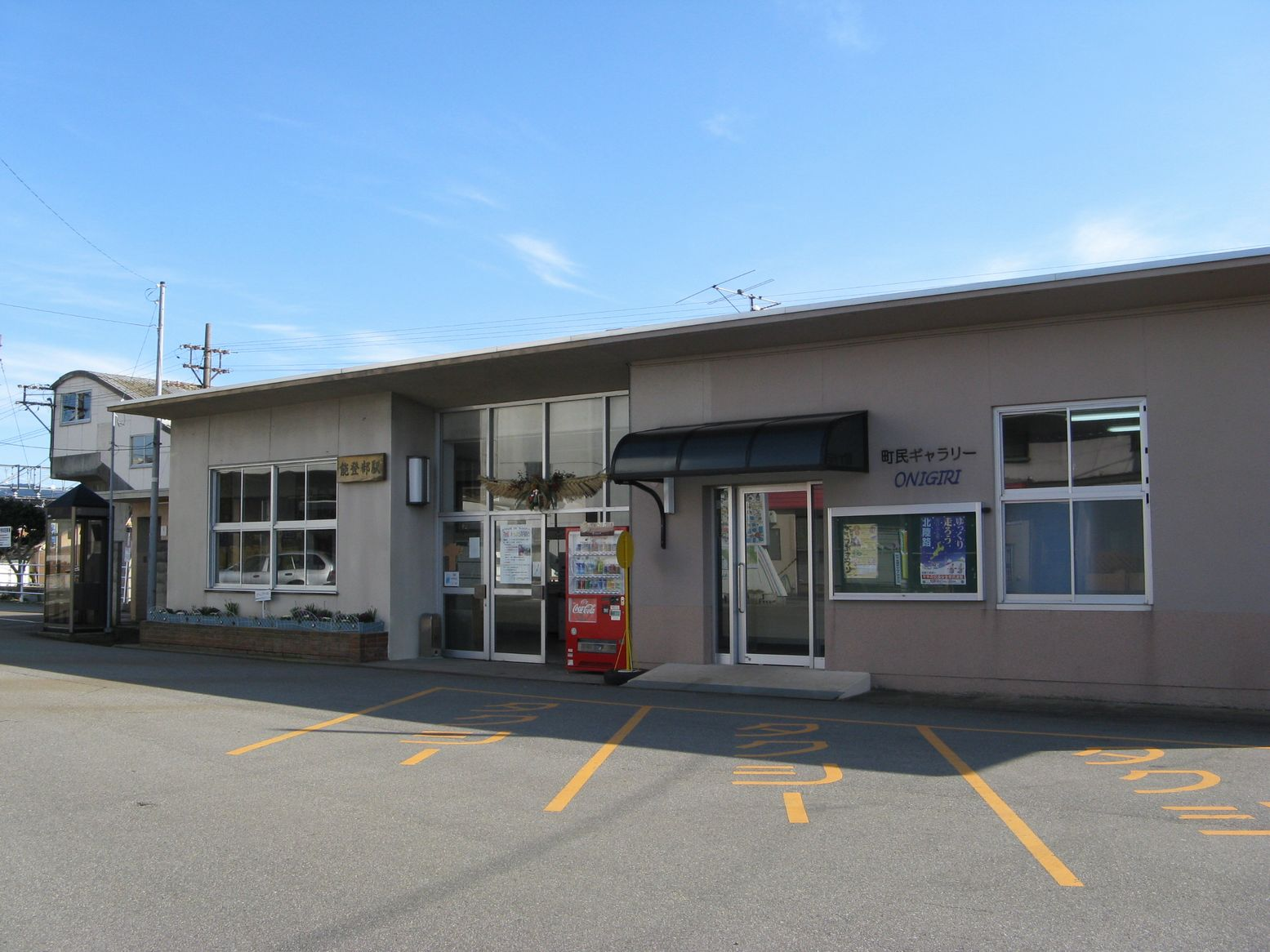
- Notobe Station in January 2009

General information
- Location: Notobe, Nakanoto-machi, Kashima-gun, Ishikawa-ken 929-1602; Japan
- Coordinates: 36.9608°N 136.8696°E
- Operator: JR West
- Line: ■ Nanao Line
- Distance: 41.1 km from Tsubata
- Platforms: 2 side platforms
- Tracks: 2

Construction
- Structure type: At grade

Other information
- Status: Staffed
- Website: Official website

History
- Opened: 24 April 1898

Passengers
- FY2015: 578 daily
Location
- Location within Japan

Notobe Station (能登部駅, Notobe-eki) is a railway station on the Nanao Line in Nakanoto, Kashima District, Ishikawa Prefecture, Japan, operated by the West Japan Railway Company (JR West).

== Lines ==
Notobe Station is served by the Nanao Line, and is located 41.1 kilometers from the end of the line at Tsubata and 52.6 kilometers from Kanazawa.

== Station layout ==
The station consists of two opposed ground-level side platforms connected by a footbridge. The station is attended.

=== Platforms ===
1	■ Nanao Line	for Nanao
2	■ Nanao Line	for Tsubata and Kanazawa

== Adjacent stations ==
«	Service	»
Nanao Line
Kanemaru	-	Yoshikawa

== History ==
The station opened on April 24, 1898. With the privatization of Japanese National Railways (JNR) on April 1, 1987, the station came under the control of JR West.

== Passenger statistics ==
In fiscal 2015, the station was used by an average of 578 passengers daily (boarding passengers only).

== Surrounding area ==
- National Route 159
- Former Rokusei Town Hall
- Rokusei Junior High School
- Rokusei Elementary School

== See also ==
- List of railway stations in Japan
