= Shikinami Station =

Railway station in Hōdatsushimizu, Ishikawa Prefecture, Japan

Shikinami Station 敷浪駅
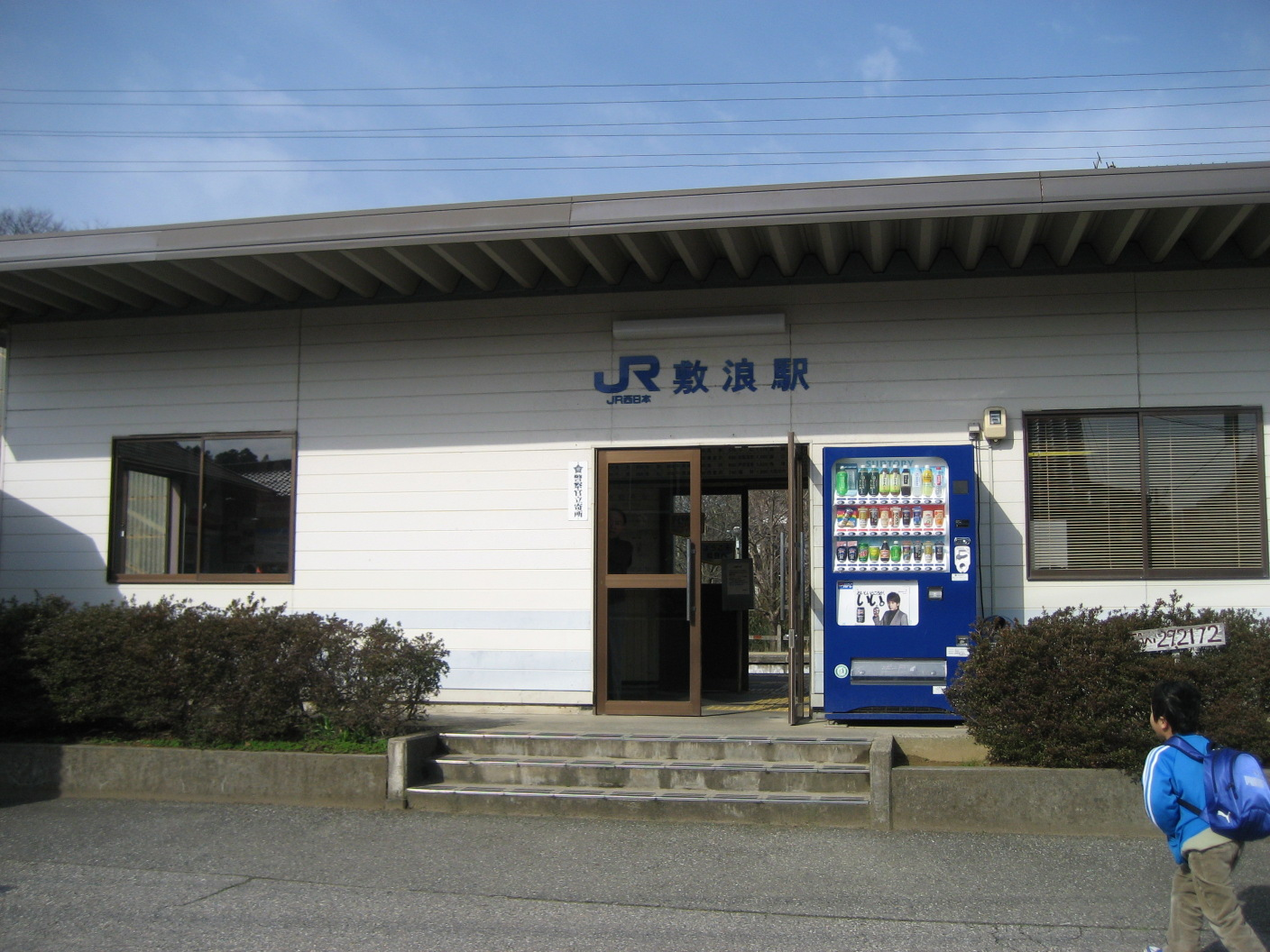
- Shikinami Station in March 2008

General information
- Location: Shikinami, Hōdatsushimizu-machi, Hakui-gun, Ishikawa-ken 929-1415; Japan
- Coordinates: 36.8482°N 136.7737°E
- Operator: JR West
- Line: ■ Nanao Line
- Distance: 24.2 km from Tsubata
- Platforms: 2 side platforms
- Tracks: 2

Construction
- Structure type: At grade

Other information
- Status: Unstaffed
- Website: Official website

History
- Opened: 24 April 1898
Location
- Location within Japan

Shikinami Station (敷浪駅, Shikinami-eki) is a railway station on the Nanao Line in the town of Hōdatsushimizu, Hakui District, Ishikawa Prefecture, Japan, operated by the West Japan Railway Company (JR West).

== Lines ==
Shikinami Station is served by the Nanao Line, and is located 35.7 kilometers from the end of the line at Tsubata and 45.3 kilometers from Kanazawa.

== Station layout ==
The station consists of two opposed unnumbered ground-level side platforms connected by a footbridge. The station is unattended.

=== Platforms ===
station side	■ Nanao Line	for Nanao
opposite side	■ Nanao Line	for Tsubata and Kanazawa

== Adjacent stations ==
«	Service	»
Nanao Line
Hōdatsu	-	Minami-Hakui

== History ==
The station opened on April 24, 1898. With the privatization of Japanese National Railways (JNR) on April 1, 1987, the station came under the control of JR West.

== Surrounding area ==
- National Route 159

== See also ==
- List of railway stations in Japan
