= Naka-Tsubata Station =

Railway station in Tsubata, Ishikawa Prefecture, Japan

Naka-Tsubata Station 中津幡駅
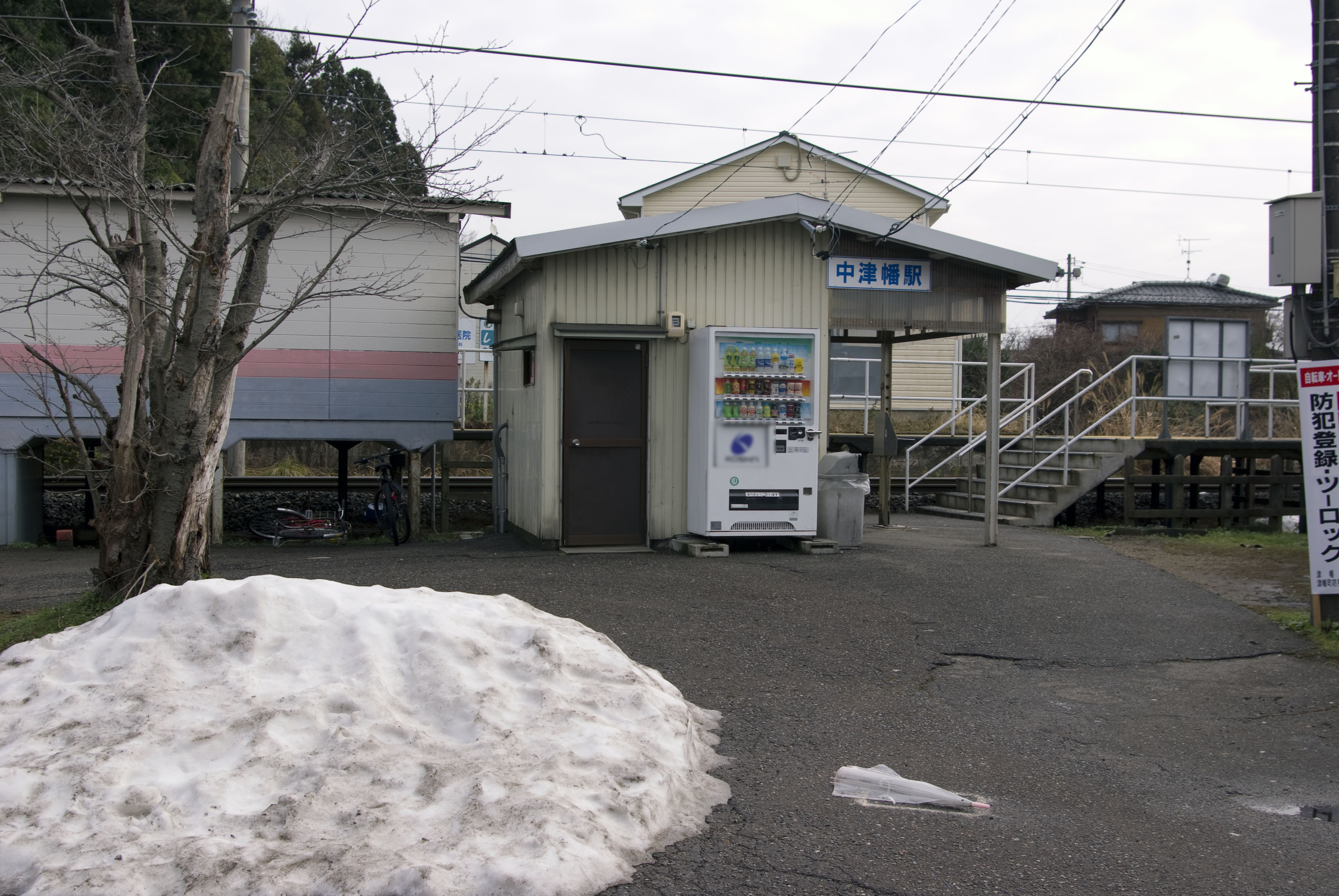
- Naka-Tsubata Station in December 2009

General information
- Location: 505 Tsubata, Tsubata-machi, Kahoku-gun, Ishikawa-ken 929-0323; Japan
- Coordinates: 36.6718°N 136.7402°E
- Operator: JR West
- Line: ■ Nanao Line
- Distance: 1.8 km from Tsubata
- Platforms: 1 side platform
- Tracks: 1

Construction
- Structure type: At grade

Other information
- Status: Unstaffed
- Website: Official website

History
- Opened: 10 February 1960
Location
- Location within Japan

Naka-Tsubata Station (中津幡駅, Naka-Tsubata-eki) is a railway station on the Nanao Line in the town of Tsubata, Kahoku District, Ishikawa Prefecture, Japan, operated by the West Japan Railway Company (JR West).

== Lines ==
Naka-Tsubata Station is served by the Nanao Line, and is located 1.8 kilometers from the end of the line at Tsubata and 13.3 kilometers from Kanazawa.

== Station layout ==
The station consists of one side platform serving single bi-directional track. The station is unattended.

== Adjacent stations ==
«	Service	»
Nanao Line
Tsubata	-	Hon-Tsubata

== History ==
The station opened on February 10, 1960. With the privatization of Japanese National Railways (JNR) on April 1, 1987, the station came under the control of JR West.

== Surrounding area ==
- National Route 159
- Tsubata High School
- Tsubata Junior High School
- The Koji Nada House

== See also ==
- List of railway stations in Japan
