= Unoke Station =

Railway station in Kahoku, Ishikawa Prefecture, Japan

Unoke Station 宇野気駅
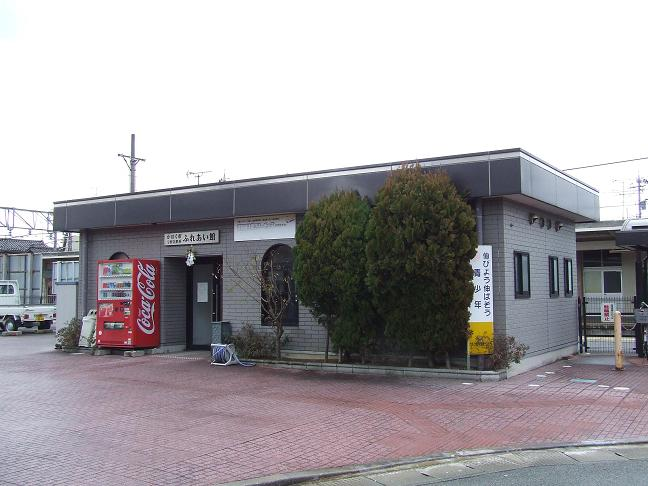
- Unoke Station in June 2009

General information
- Location: 70-5 Unike, Kahoku-shi, Ishikawa-ken 929-1125; Japan
- Coordinates: 36.7225°N 136.7027°E
- Operator: JR West
- Line: ■ Nanao Line
- Distance: 8.8 km from Tsubata
- Platforms: 2 side platforms
- Tracks: 2

Construction
- Structure type: At grade

Other information
- Status: Staffed (Midori no Madoguchi)
- Website: Official website

History
- Opened: 24 April 1898

Passengers
- FY2015: 1338 daily
Location
- Location within Japan

Unoke Station (宇野気駅, Unoke-eki) is a railway station on the Nanao Line in the city of Kahoku, Ishikawa Prefecture, Japan, operated by the West Japan Railway Company (JR West).

== Lines ==
Unoke Station is served by the Nanao Line, and is located 8.8 kilometers from the end of the line at Tsubata and 20.3 kilometers from Kanazawa.

== Station layout ==
The station consists of two opposed ground-level side platforms connected by a footbridge. The station has a Midori no Madoguchi staffed ticket office.

=== Platforms ===
1	■ Nanao Line	for Tsubata and Kanazawa
2	■ Nanao Line	for Hakui and Nanao

== Adjacent stations ==
«	Service	»
Nanao Line
Nose	-	Yokoyama

== History ==
The station opened on April 24, 1898. With the privatization of Japanese National Railways (JNR) on April 1, 1987, the station came under the control of JR West.

== Passenger statistics ==
In fiscal 2015, the station was used by an average of 1,338 passengers daily (boarding passengers only).

== Surrounding area ==
- former Unoke Town Hall
- Unoke Junior High School
- Unoke Elementary School

== See also ==
- List of railway stations in Japan
