= Morimoto Station =

Railway station in Kanazawa, Ishikawa Prefecture, Japan

Morimoto Station 森本駅
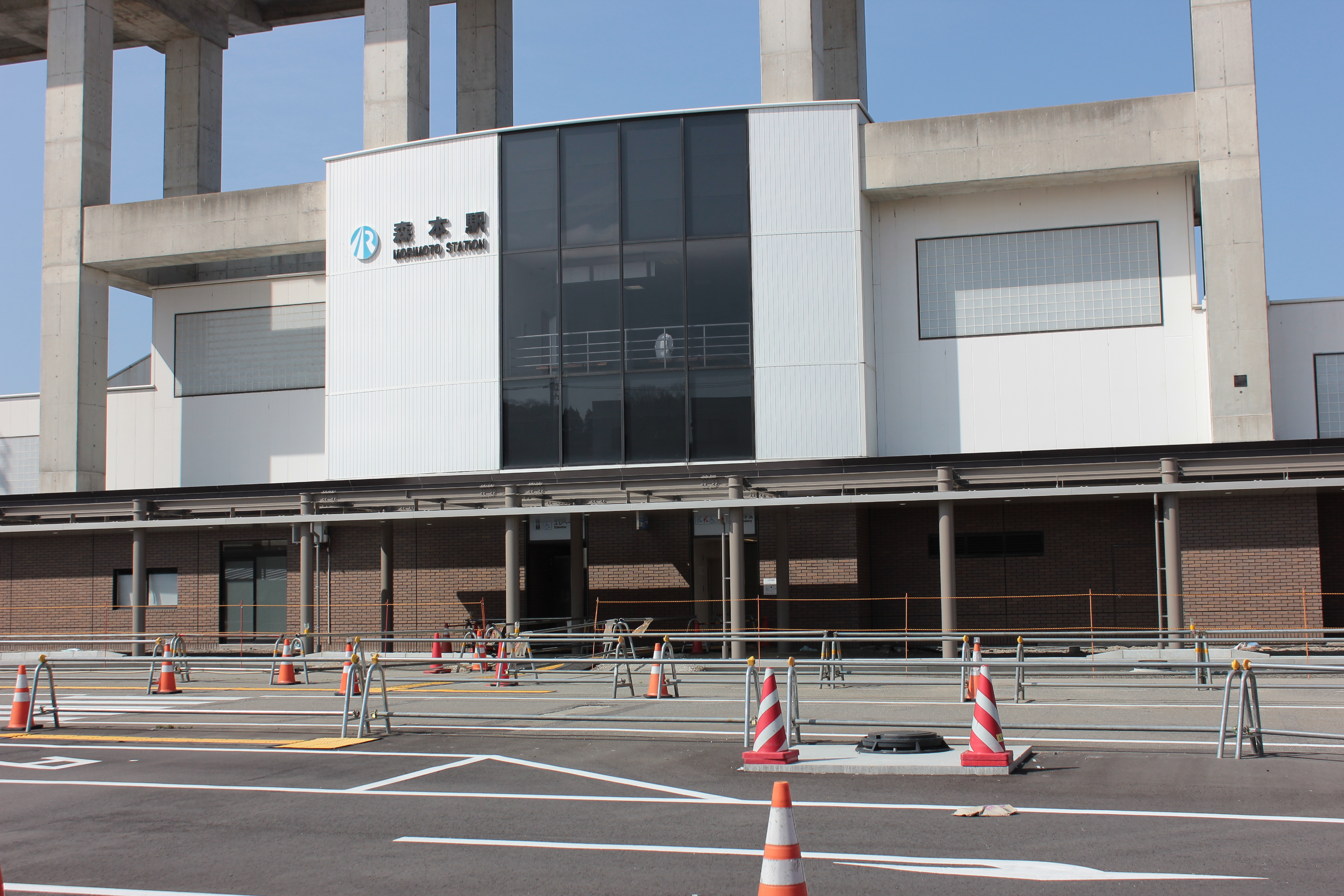
- Morimoto Station in March 2010

General information
- Location: 61-2 Ro, Mirokumachi, Kanazawa-shi, Ishikawa-ken 920-3115; Japan
- Coordinates: 36.6122°N 136.6894°E
- Operator: IR Ishikawa Railway
- Line: ■ IR Ishikawa Railway Line
- Distance: 5.4 km from Kanazawa
- Platforms: 1 side * 1 island platform
- Tracks: 3

Other information
- Status: Staffed
- Website: Official website

History
- Opened: 1 November 1911

Passengers
- FY2015: 1648
Location
- Location within Japan

Morimoto Station (森本駅, Morimoto-eki) is a railway station on the IR Ishikawa Railway Line in Kanazawa, Ishikawa, Japan, operated by the third-sector railway operator IR Ishikawa Railway.

== Lines ==
Morimoto Station is served by the IR Ishikawa Railway Line between Daishōji and Kurikara, and lies 5.4 km east of Kanazawa. Through trains to and from the Ainokaze Toyama Railway Line and JR West Nanao Line also operate over this line.

== Layout ==
The station consists of a side platform (platform 1) and island platform (platforms 2 and 3) serving a total of three tracks, with the station building located above the platforms. The station is staffed.

=== Platforms ===
1	■ IR Ishikawa Railway Line	for Kanazawa
2	■ IR Ishikawa Railway Line	for Takaoka and Toyama
2	■ Nanao Line	for Hakui and Nanao

== Adjacent stations ==
«	Service	»
IR Ishikawa Railway Line
Ainokaze Liner: Does not stop at this station
Higashi-Kanazawa	Local	Tsubata

== History ==
The station opened on 1 November 1911. With the privatization of JNR on 1 April 1987, the station came under the control of JR West. From 14 March 2015, with the opening of the Hokuriku Shinkansen extension from Nagano to Kanazawa, local passenger operations over sections of the Hokuriku Main Line running roughly parallel to the new shinkansen line were reassigned to different third-sector railway operating companies. From this date, Morimoto Station was transferred to the ownership of the third-sector operating company IR Ishikawa Railway.

== Surrounding area ==
- National Route 359
- Kanazawa Koyo High School
- Ishikawa Prefectural School for Students with Special Needs

== Passenger statistics ==
In fiscal 2015, the station was used by an average of 1,648 passengers daily (boarding passengers only).

== See also ==
- List of railway stations in Japan
