= Kanemaru Station =

Railway station in Nakanoto, Ishikawa Prefecture, Japan

Kanemaru Station 金丸駅
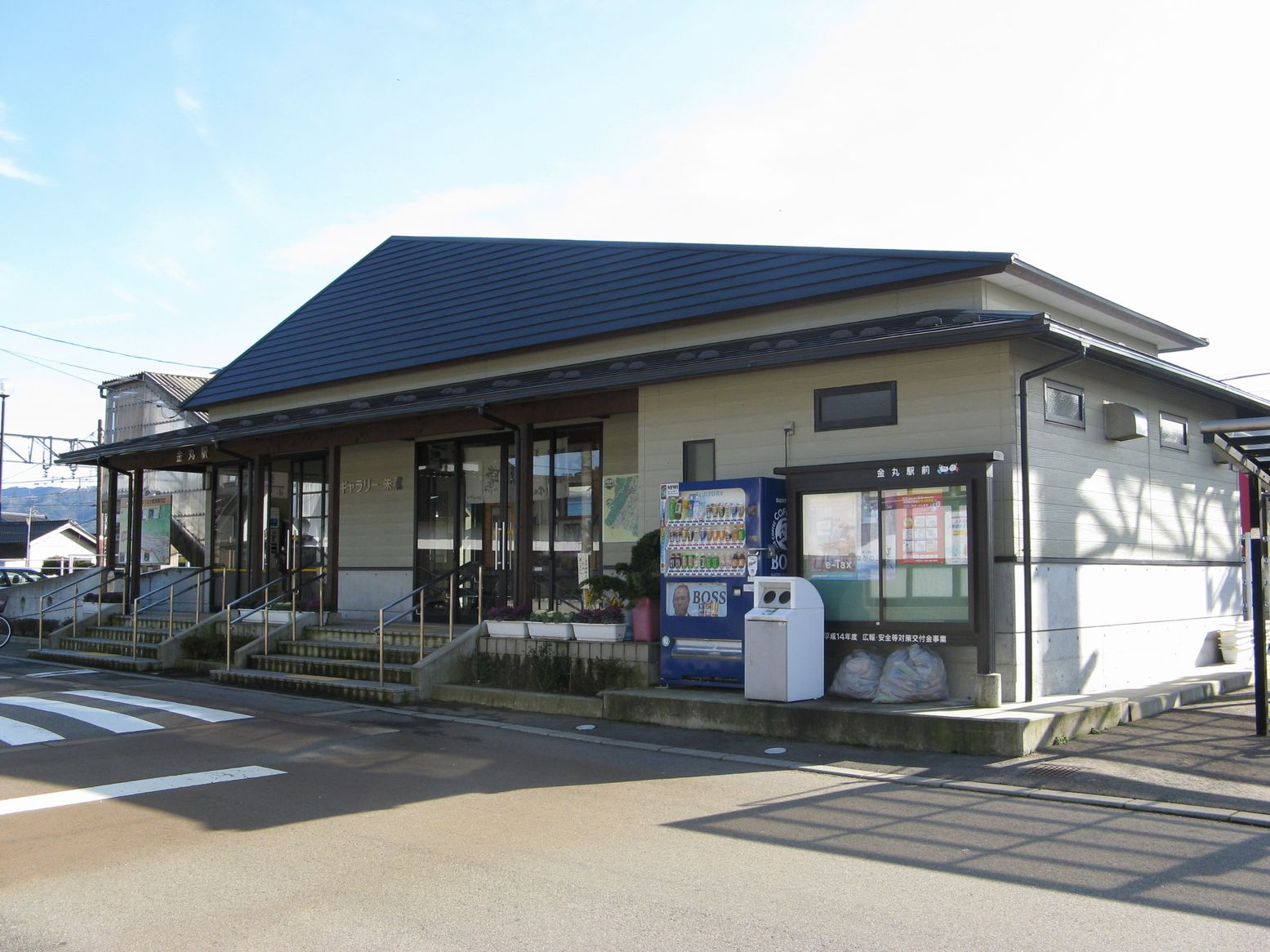
- Kanemaru Station in January 2009

General information
- Location: Kanemaru matare-49, Nakanoto-machi, Kashima-gun, Ishikawa-ken 929-1521; Japan
- Coordinates: 36.9433°N 136.8358°E
- Operator: JR West
- Line: ■ Nanao Line
- Distance: 37.5 km from Tsubata
- Platforms: 2 side platforms
- Tracks: 2

Construction
- Structure type: At grade

Other information
- Status: Unstaffed
- Website: Official website

History
- Opened: 24 April 1898
Location
- Location within Japan

Kanemaru Station (金丸駅, Kanemaru-eki) is a railway station on the Nanao Line in Nakanoto, Kashima District, Ishikawa Prefecture, Japan, operated by the West Japan Railway Company (JR West), opened in 1898.

== Lines ==
Kanemaru Station is served by the Nanao Line, and is located 37.5 kilometers from the end of the line at Tsubata and 49.0 kilometers from Kanazawa.

== Station layout ==
The station consists of two opposed ground-level side platforms connected by a footbridge. The station is unattended.

=== Platforms ===
1	■ Nanao Line	for Nanao
2	■ Nanao Line	for Tsubata and Kanazawa

== Adjacent stations ==
«	Service	»
Nanao Line
Chiji	-	Notobe

== History ==
The station opened on April 24, 1898. With the privatization of Japanese National Railways (JNR) on April 1, 1987, the station came under the control of JR West. The station building was rebuilt in May 2005.

== Surrounding area ==
- National Route 159
- Kanemaru Post Office

== See also ==
- List of railway stations in Japan
