= Kamiyamada Shell Mound =

Shell midden in Kahoku, Hokuriku, Japan

Kamiyamada Shell Midden
- 上山田貝塚 (Japanese)
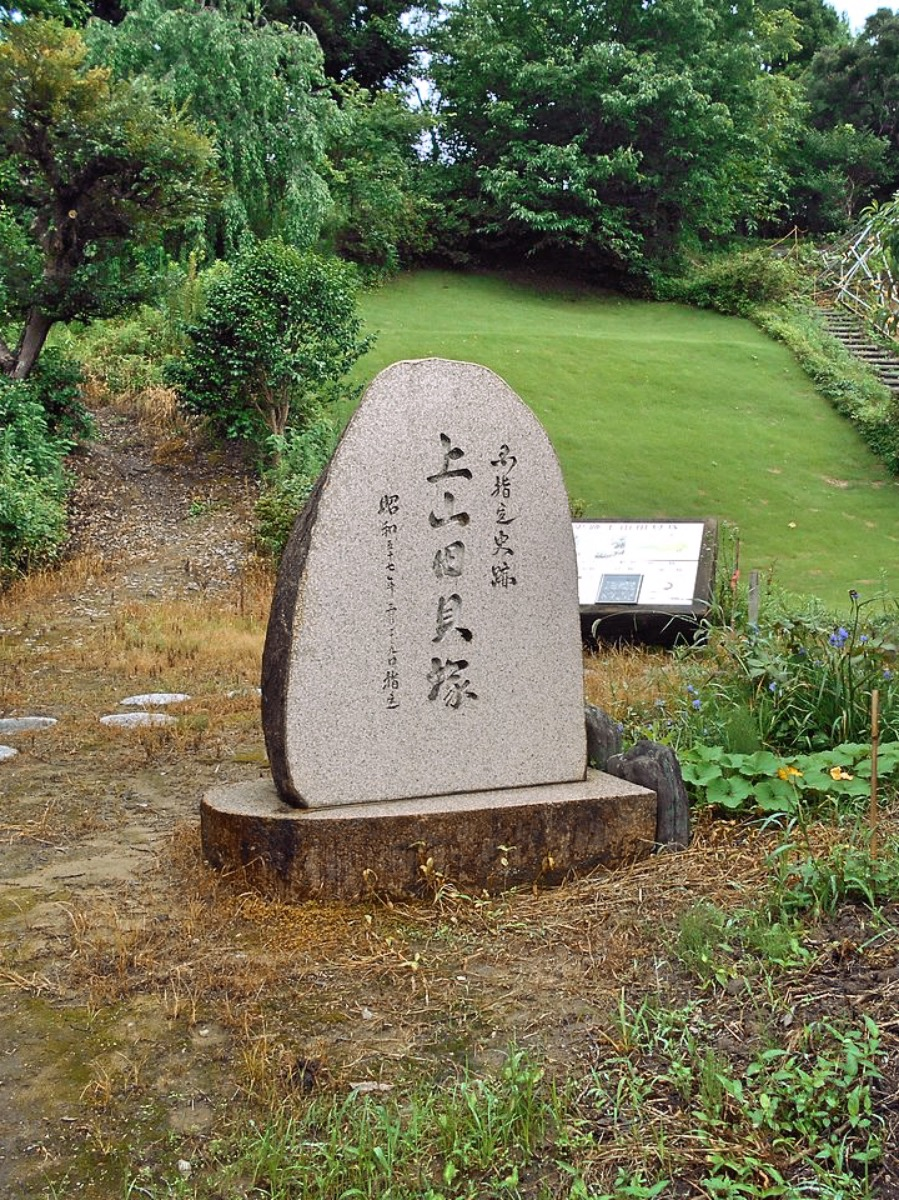
- Kamiyamada Shell Midden site

- Kamiyamada Shell Midden Kamiyamada Shell Mound (Japan)
- 36°43′01″N 136°43′01″E
- Type: Midden
- Periods: Jōmon period
- Location: Kahoku, Ishikawa, Japan
- Region: Hokuriku region

Site notes
- Area: 6,831.7 m^{2} (73,536 sq ft)
- Public access: Yes (park)

The Kamiyamada Shell Midden (上山田貝塚, Kamiyamada Kaizuka) is a middle Jōmon period shell midden located in what is now part of the city of Kahoku, Ishikawa in the Hokuriku region of Japan. The site was designated a National Historic Site of Japan in 1982. The middens were discovered in 1930 and are noteworthy as the first shell midden to be discovered in Ishikawa Prefecture.

== Overview ==
During the early to middle Jōmon period (approximately 4000 to 2500 BC), sea levels were five to six meters higher than at present, and the ambient temperature was also 2 deg C higher. During this period, the Hokuriku region was inhabited by the Jōmon people, many of whom lived in coastal settlements. The middens associated with such settlements contain bone, botanical material, mollusc shells, sherds, lithics, and other artifacts and ecofacts associated with the now-vanished inhabitants, and these features, provide a useful source into the diets and habits of Jōmon society. Most of these middens are found along the Pacific coast of Japan.

The Kamiyamada Shell Midden is an unusual example of midden located on the coastline of the Sea of Japan. It is on 20 meter hill approximately three kilometers from the present shoreline. The midden extends for about 250 meters east-to-west, and about 80 meters north-to-south. The site consists of two separate middens, with a shell layer that is about 150 centimeters thick in places. Some of the shells are from brackish water shellfish; however, the majority of the shells are from freshwater mussels, along with the bones of freshwater fish, such as eels and carp. Between the site and the coast is the Uchinada dunes, a chain of large sand dunes and a large marsh called Kahokugata, which extends for approximately two kilometers.

The site was discovered in November 1930 by a local artist, and was first excavated in 1931. A second excavation was conducted in 1960, and again in 1975 and 1976.

In addition, a number of artifacts of Jōmon pottery and stone tools were discovered, including a unique cylindrical object with what appears to be the clay figures of a woman with a child. The site is a type site for "Kamiyamada style pottery", which is found in various other locations in the Hokuriku region. Many of the excavated relics are stored at the Nishida Memorial Museum (町立西田記念館). The midden site is about 20 minutes on foot from Unoke Station on the JR West Nanao Line.

== See also ==
- List of Historic Sites of Japan (Ishikawa)
