= Kahoku =

Kahoku かほく市
- City
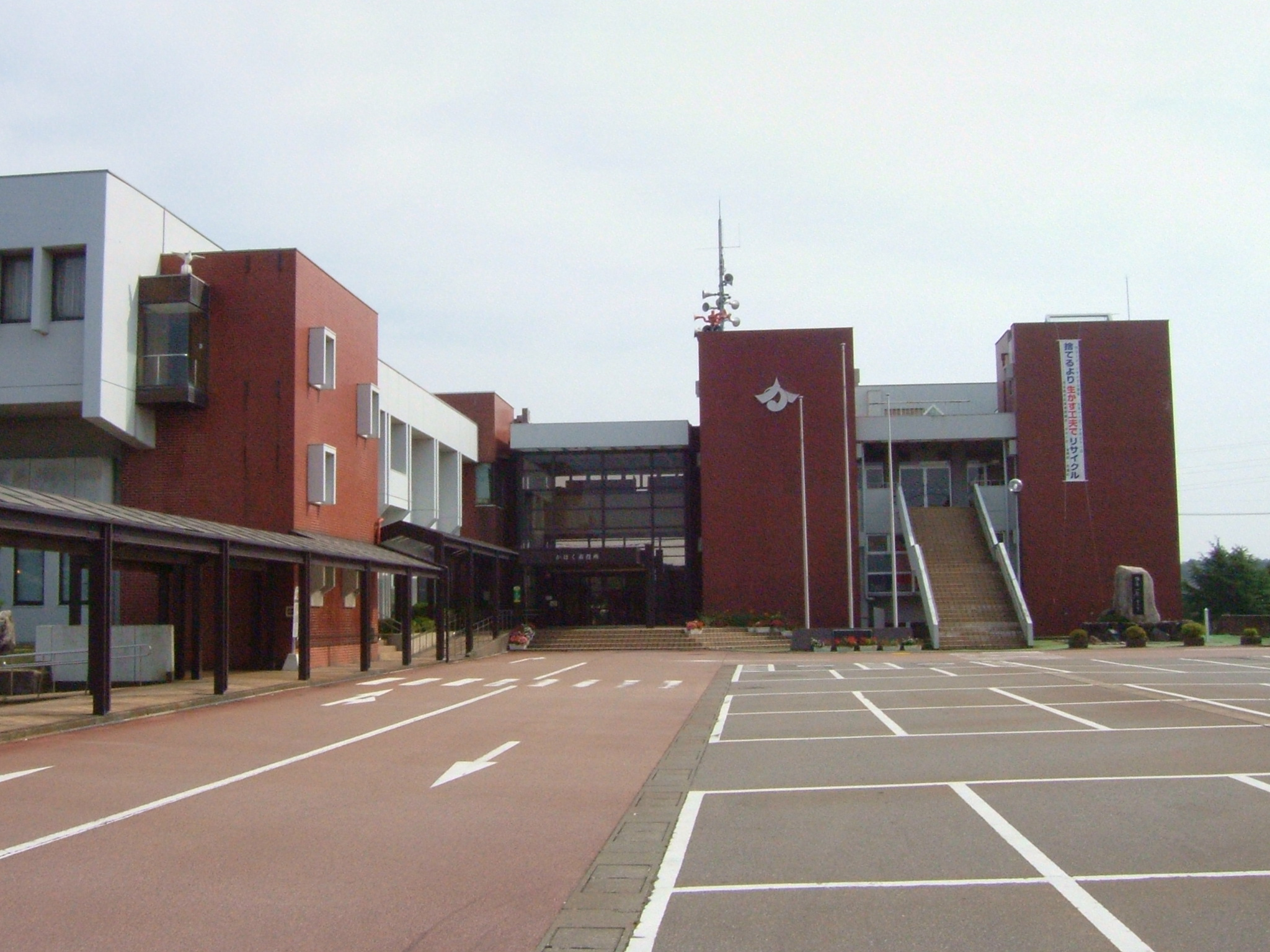
- Kahoku City Hall

- Flag Seal

- Location of Kahoku in Ishikawa Prefecture

- Coordinates: 36°43′11.3″N 136°42′24.1″E
- Country: Japan
- Region: Chūbu (Hokuriku)
- Prefecture: Ishikawa Prefecture

Government
  - - Mayor: Waichiro Aburano

Area
  - Total: 64.44 km^{2} (24.88 sq mi)

Population (January 31, 2018)
  - Total: 35,188
  - Density: 546.1/km^{2} (1,414/sq mi)
- Time zone: UTC+9 (Japan Standard Time)
- Phone number: 076-283-1111
- Address: 81 Unoke, Kahoku-shi, Ishikawa-ken 929-1195
- Climate: Cfa
- Website: Official website
- Symbols
- Bird: Kentish plover
- Flower: Rosa rugosa
- Tree: Sakura

Kahoku (かほく市, Kahoku-shi) is a city located in Ishikawa Prefecture, Japan. As of 31 January 2018, the city had an estimated population of 35,188 in 12787 households, and a population density of 550 persons per km^{2}. The total area of the city was 64.44 square kilometres (24.88 sq mi).

== Geography ==
Kahoku is located in central Ishikawa Prefecture. It is approximately 20 km north of the capital of, Kanazawa, or thirty minutes by train. Kahoku lies between the Sea of Japan to the west, the town of Hōdatsushimizu to the north, the town of Tsubata to the east and the town of Uchinada to the south. Geographically from the east to west, Kahoku is composed of a mountainous region, a hilly region, a terrace region, a lowland region and then a coastal region. In the northern part of town the Ōmi River flows into the Sea of Japan and in the southern area, the Unoke River flows into the Kahoku Lagoon which marks the southernmost part of Kahoku.

=== Neighbouring municipalities ===
- Ishikawa Prefecture
  - Hōdatsushimizu
  - Tsubata
  - Uchinada

=== Climate ===
Kahoku has a humid subtropical climate (Köppen Cfa) characterized by mild summers and cold winters with heavy snowfall. The average annual temperature in Kahoku is 14.1 °C. The average annual rainfall is 2500 mm with September as the wettest month. The temperatures are highest on average in August, at around 26.6 °C, and lowest in January, at around 2.9 °C.

Climate data for Kahoku (1991−2020 normals, extremes 1978−present)
Month	Jan	Feb	Mar	Apr	May	Jun	Jul	Aug	Sep	Oct	Nov	Dec	Year
Record high °C (°F)	19.3 (66.7)	23.2 (73.8)	28.0 (82.4)	30.0 (86.0)	31.4 (88.5)	34.6 (94.3)	37.7 (99.9)	39.2 (102.6)	36.9 (98.4)	33.8 (92.8)	26.3 (79.3)	23.5 (74.3)	39.2 (102.6)
Mean daily maximum °C (°F)	6.7 (44.1)	7.2 (45.0)	10.8 (51.4)	16.2 (61.2)	21.1 (70.0)	24.4 (75.9)	28.3 (82.9)	30.3 (86.5)	26.5 (79.7)	21.3 (70.3)	15.5 (59.9)	9.9 (49.8)	18.2 (64.7)
Daily mean °C (°F)	3.3 (37.9)	3.5 (38.3)	6.4 (43.5)	11.5 (52.7)	16.5 (61.7)	20.5 (68.9)	24.7 (76.5)	26.2 (79.2)	22.3 (72.1)	16.7 (62.1)	11.0 (51.8)	6.0 (42.8)	14.1 (57.3)
Mean daily minimum °C (°F)	0.2 (32.4)	−0.1 (31.8)	2.0 (35.6)	6.7 (44.1)	12.0 (53.6)	17.0 (62.6)	21.6 (70.9)	22.7 (72.9)	18.6 (65.5)	12.6 (54.7)	6.9 (44.4)	2.4 (36.3)	10.2 (50.4)
Record low °C (°F)	−6.4 (20.5)	−5.5 (22.1)	−4.2 (24.4)	−1.8 (28.8)	3.3 (37.9)	8.7 (47.7)	13.7 (56.7)	14.5 (58.1)	8.6 (47.5)	2.1 (35.8)	−1.0 (30.2)	−4.8 (23.4)	−6.4 (20.5)
Average precipitation mm (inches)	210.9 (8.30)	125.8 (4.95)	129.4 (5.09)	121.5 (4.78)	123.5 (4.86)	167.5 (6.59)	221.9 (8.74)	186.2 (7.33)	213.7 (8.41)	154.9 (6.10)	209.5 (8.25)	252.7 (9.95)	2,117.4 (83.36)
Average precipitation days (≥ 1.0 mm)	23.9	18.5	15.9	12.1	10.5	10.9	12.9	9.2	12.5	13.1	17.2	23.1	179.8
Mean monthly sunshine hours	59.4	87.6	154.7	193.3	211.7	167.5	174.3	225.2	159.8	150.2	107.9	66.3	1,757.9
Source: Japan Meteorological Agency

== Demographics ==
Per Japanese census data, the population of Kahoku has remained steady over the past 40 years.

Historical population
Year	Pop.	±%
1970	32,225	—
1980	34,106	+5.8%
1990	34,207	+0.3%
2000	34,670	+1.4%
2010	34,651	−0.1%
2020	34,889	+0.7%

== History ==
The area around Kahoku was mostly part of ancient Kaga Province, with a small portion of its northern area in Noto Province. The area became part Kaga Domain under the Edo period Tokugawa shogunate. Following the Meiji restoration, the area was organised into Kahoku District, Ishikawa. The villages of Takamatsu, Nanatsuka and Unoke were established with the creation of the modern municipalities system on April 1, 1889. Takamatsu was raised to town status on August 1, 1922, Nanatsuka on February 11, 1940, and Unoke on February 11, 1948. The three towns merged on March 1, 2004, to form the city of Kahoku.

== Government ==
Kahoku has a mayor-council form of government with a directly elected mayor and a unicameral city legislature of 18 members.

== Economy ==
The local economy of Kahoku is dominated by agriculture.

== Education ==
Kahoku has six public elementary schools and three middle schools operated by the city government; however, the city does not have a high school. The Ishikawa Prefectural Nursing University is also located in Kahoku.

=== Junior high schools ===
- Kahokudai Junior High School
- Takamatsu Junior High School
- Unoke Junior High School

=== Elementary schools ===
- Kanazu Elementary School
- Nanatsuka Elementary school
- Ōmi Elementary school
- Sotohisumi Elementary school
- Takamatsu Elementary School
- Unoke Elementary School

== Transportation ==
=== Railway ===
West Japan Railway Company - Nanao Line

- Unoke - Yokoyama - Takamatsu

=== Highway ===
National Route 159
National Route 471

== Sister cities ==
Kahoku is twinned with:

- Meßkirch, Germany, since 1985

== Local attractions ==
- Kamiyamada Shell Mound, a National Historic Site

== Mascot ==
Nyantaro, the city's mascot

Kahoku's mascot is Nyantaro (にゃんたろう), a 5-year-old cat. His birthday is 28 May. He ends his sentences with the Japanese onomatopoeia for "meow".

== Notable people from Kahoku ==
- Kitaro Nishida, philosopher
