= Kanemaru =

Kanemaru (written: 金丸) is both a Japanese surname and a masculine Japanese given name. Notable people with the name include:

== Surname ==
- Shin Kanemaru (金丸 信; 1914–1996), Japanese politician
- Jun'ichi Kanemaru (金丸 淳一; born 1963), Japanese voice actor
- Yoshinobu Kanemaru (金丸 義信; born 1976), Japanese professional wrestler
- Yuzo Kanemaru (金丸 祐三; born 1987), Japanese sprinter

== Given name ==
- Kanemaru Shiratori (白鳥 金丸; born 1942), Japanese boxer
- Shō En (1415–1476), Ryukyuan monarch originally known as Kanemaru

== See also ==
- Kanemaru Station, a railway station in Ishikawa Prefecture, Japan
