= Higashi-Kanazawa Station =

Railway station in Kanazawa, Ishikawa Prefecture, Japan

Higashi-Kanazawa Station 東金沢駅
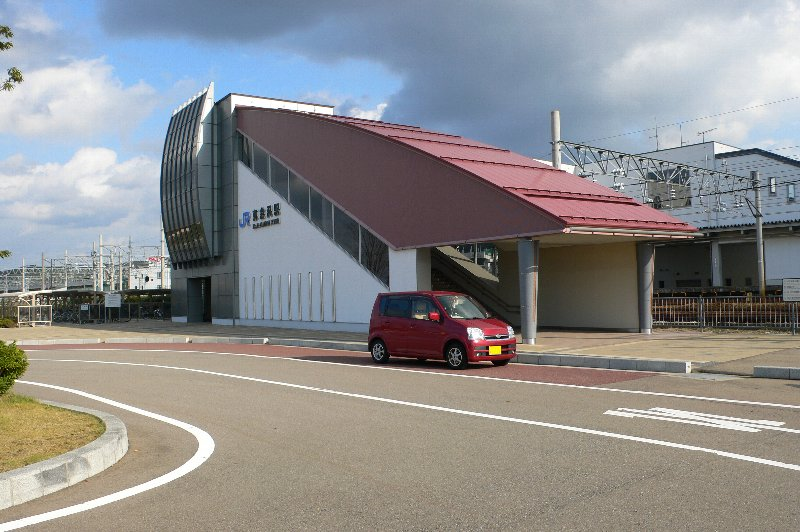
- Higashi-Kanazawa Station exterior in November 2011

General information
- Location: 204 Miike-machi, Kanazawa-shi, Ishikawa-ken 920-0802; Japan
- Coordinates: 36.5937°N 136.6697°E
- Operator: IR Ishikawa Railway
- Line: ■ IR Ishikawa Railway Line
- Distance: 2.6 km from Kanazawa
- Platforms: 1 island platform
- Tracks: 2

Construction
- Structure type: At-grade

Other information
- Status: Staffed
- Website: Official website

History
- Opened: 1 August 1933

Passengers
- FY2015: 2849
Location
- Location within Japan

Higashi-Kanazawa Station (東金沢駅, Higashi-Kanazawa-eki) is a railway station on the IR Ishikawa Railway Line in the city of Kanazawa, Ishikawa, Japan, operated by the third sector railway operator IR Ishikawa Railway.

== Lines ==
Higashi-Kanazawa Station is served by the IR Ishikawa Railway Line between Daishōji and Kurikara, and lies 2.6 km east of Kanazawa. Through trains to and from the Ainokaze Toyama Railway Line and JR West Nanao Line also operate over this line.

== Layout ==
The station consists of an island platform serving two tracks, with and elevated station building located above the platform, with entrances on the east and west sides.

=== Platforms ===
1	■ IR Ishikawa Railway Line	for Kanazawa
2	■ IR Ishikawa Railway Line	for Takaoka and Toyama
2	■ Nanao Line	for Hakui and Nanao

== Adjacent stations ==
«	Service	»
IR Ishikawa Railway Line
Ainokaze Liner: Does not stop at this station
Kanazawa	Local	Morimoto

== History ==
The station opened on 1 August 1933. With the privatization of JNR on 1 April 1987, the station came under the control of JR West. From 14 March 2015, with the opening of the Hokuriku Shinkansen extension from Nagano to Kanazawa, local passenger operations over sections of the Hokuriku Main Line running roughly parallel to the new shinkansen line were reassigned to different third-sector railway operating companies. From this date, Higashi-Kanazawa Station was transferred to the ownership of the third-sector operating company IR Ishikawa Railway.

== Surrounding area ==
- National Route 359

== Passenger statistics ==
In fiscal 2015, the station was used by an average of 2,849 passengers daily (boarding passengers only).

== See also ==
- List of railway stations in Japan
