= Japan National Route 160 =

Road in Japan

National Route 160
- 国道160号
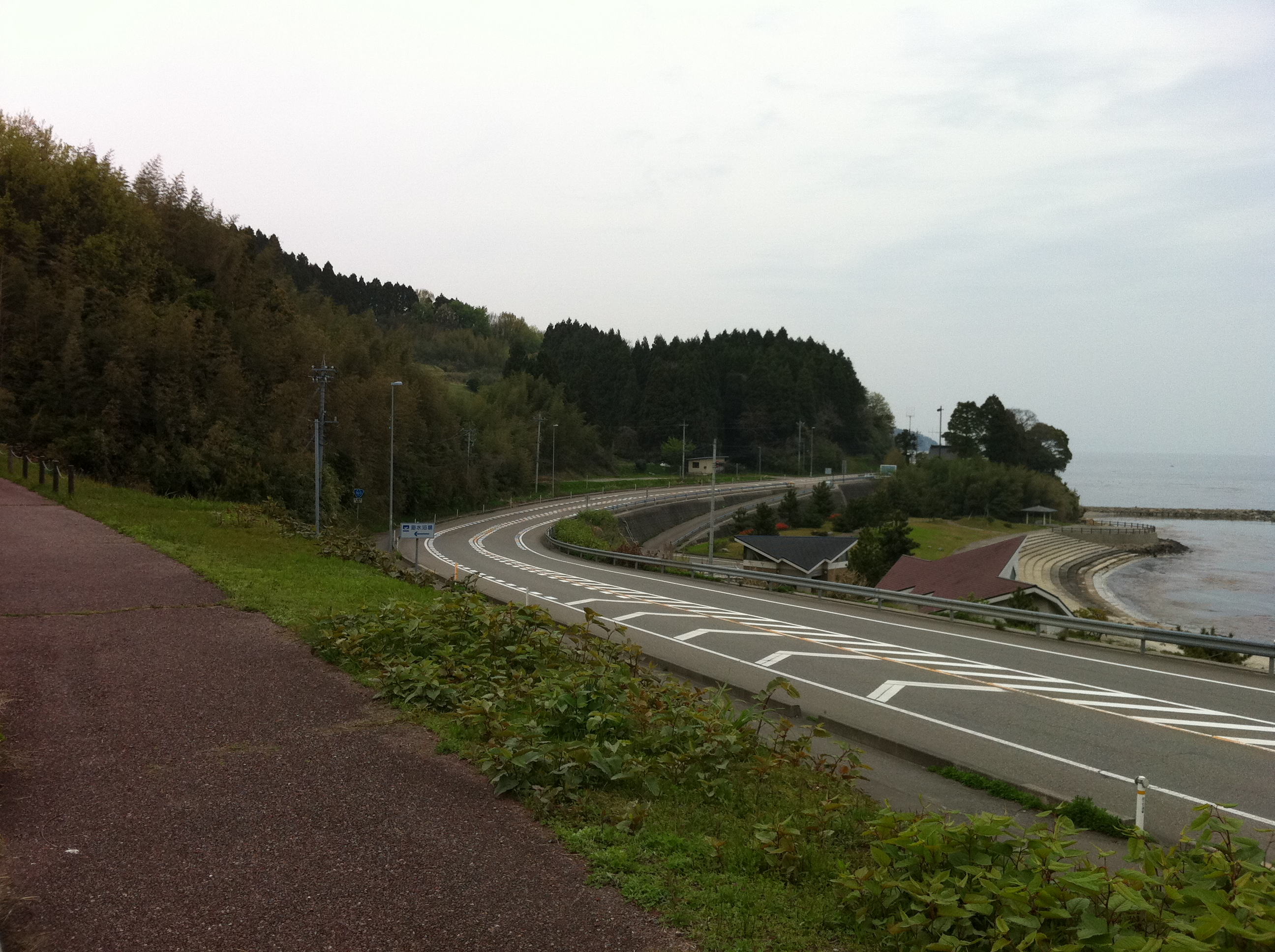

Route information
- Length: 45.8 km (28.5 mi)
- Existed: 1953–present

Major junctions
- North end: National Route 159 / National Route 249 in Nanao, Ishikawa
- South end: National Route 8 in Takaoka, Toyama

Location
- Country: Japan

Highway system
- National highways of Japan; Expressways of Japan
← National Route 159	→ National Route 161

National Route 160 is a national highway of Japan connecting Nanao, Ishikawa and Takaoka, Toyama in Japan, with a total length of 45.8 km (28.5 mi).
