= Ishikawa Prefectural Nursing University =

Higher education institution in Ishikawa Prefecture, Japan

Coordinates: 36°46′50.7″N 136°44′3″E

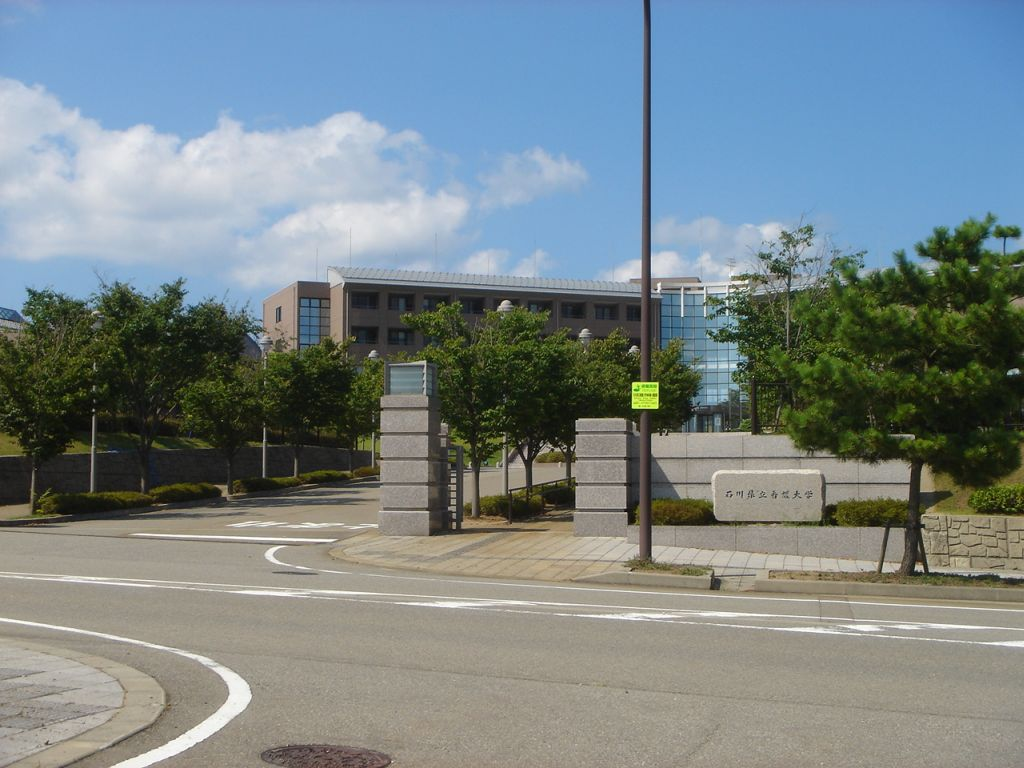
Ishikawa Prefectural Nursing University

Ishikawa Prefectural Nursing University (石川県立看護大学, Ishikawa kenritsu kango daigaku) is a public university at Kahoku, Ishikawa, Japan, established in 2000.
