= Kahoku District =

District in Ishikawa prefecture, Japan

Coordinates: 36.669°N 136.773°E

Kahoku District in Ishikawa Prefecture.

Kahoku (河北郡, Kahoku-gun) is a district located in Ishikawa Prefecture, Japan.

As of 2003, the district has an estimated population of 62,374 with a density of 476.79 persons per km^{2}. The total area is 130.82 km^{2}.

== Municipalities ==
The district consists of two towns:

- Tsubata (Note: Classified as a town.)
- Uchinada

== History ==
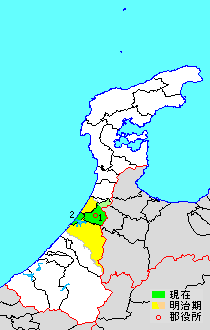
Map showing original extent of Kahoku District in Ishikawa Prefecture: * yellow - areas formerly within the district borders during the early Meiji period: 1. Tsubata-machi; 2. Uchinada-machi

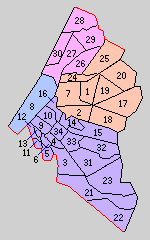
Colored areas are in this district.

=== Recent mergers ===
On March 1, 2004, The towns of Takamatsu, Nanatsuka and Unoke were merged to form the city of Kahoku.
