= Japan National Route 249 =

National highway in Japan

National Route 249
- 国道249号
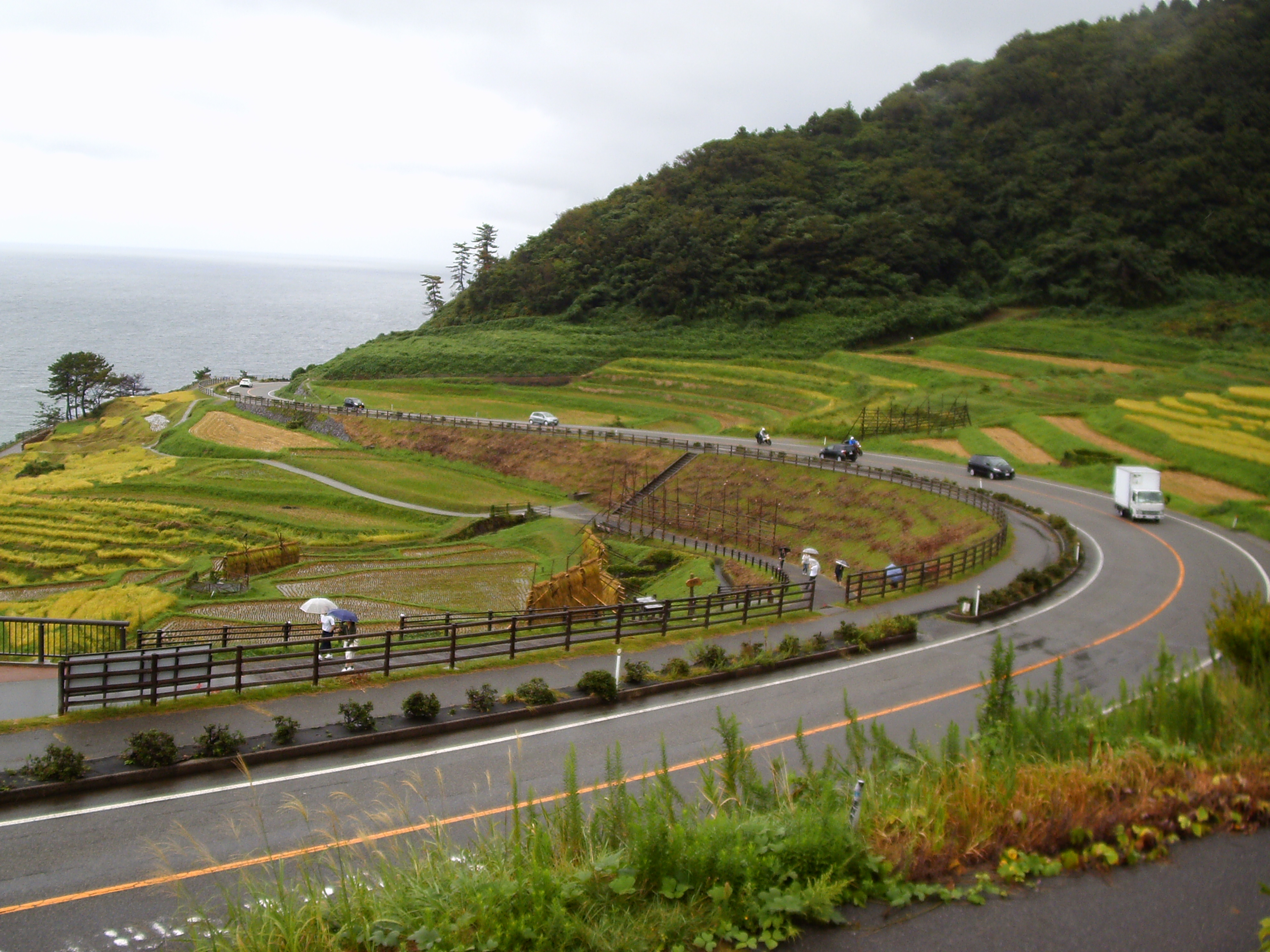

Route information
- Length: 248.8 km (154.6 mi)
- Existed: 10 July 1956–present

Major junctions
- North end: National Route 159 / National Route 160 in Nanao, Ishikawa
- South end: National Route 157 in Kanazawa, Ishikawa

Location
- Country: Japan

Highway system
- National highways of Japan; Expressways of Japan
← National Route 248	→ National Route 250

National Route 249 is a national highway of Japan connecting Nanao, Ishikawa, and Kanazawa, Ishikawa, in Japan, with a total length of 248.8 km (154.6 mi). Much of the route is concurrent with Route 159.
