= Hakui Station =

Railway station in Hakui, Ishikawa Prefecture, Japan

Hakui Station 羽咋駅
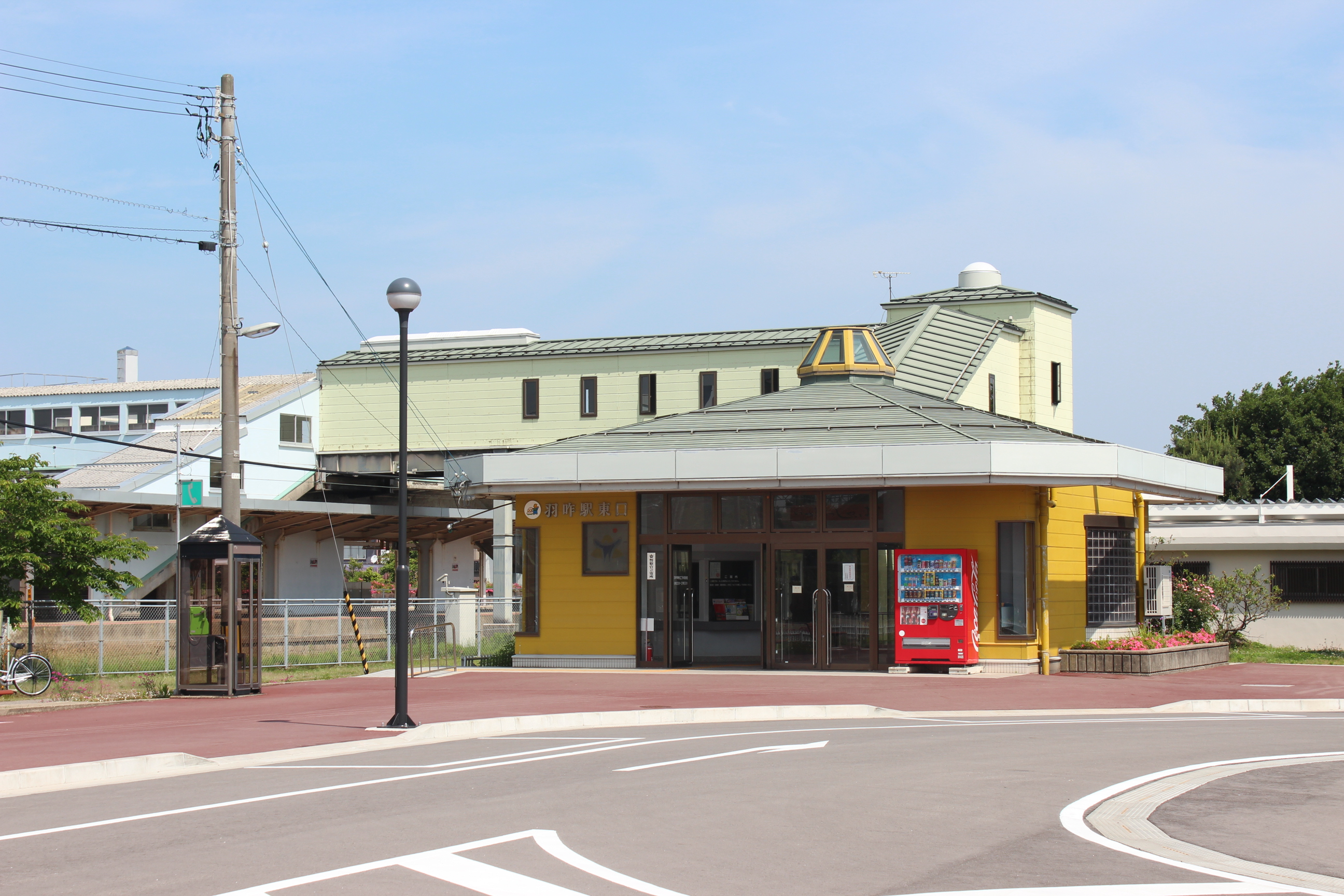
- Hakui Station east exit in May 2016

General information
- Location: 18 Kawahara-machi, Hakui-shi, Ishikawa-ken 925-0033; Japan
- Coordinates: 36.8966368°N 136.7832613°E
- Operator: JR West
- Line: ■ Nanao Line
- Distance: 29.7 km from Tsubata
- Platforms: 1 side + 1 island platform
- Tracks: 3

Construction
- Structure type: At grade

Other information
- Status: Staffed (Midori no Madoguchi)
- Website: Official website

History
- Opened: 24 April 1898; 128 years ago

Passengers
- FY2015: 1289 daily
Location
- Location within Japan

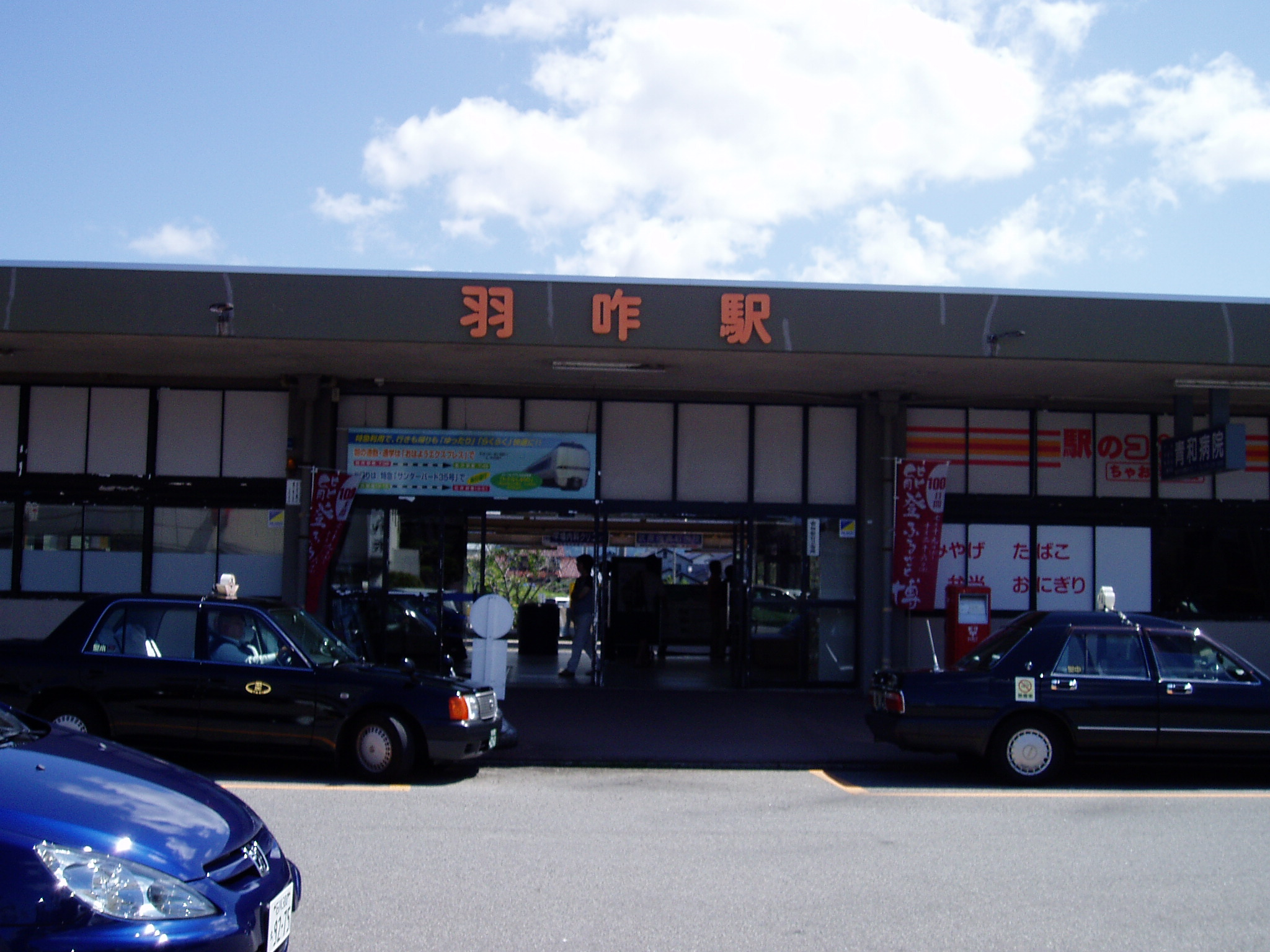
Hakui Station facade in August 2008

Hakui Station (羽咋駅, Hakui-eki) is a railway station on the Nanao Line in the city of Hakui, Ishikawa Prefecture, Japan, operated by the West Japan Railway Company (JR West).

== Lines ==
Hakui Station is served by the Nanao Line, and is located 29.7 kilometers from the end of the line at Tsubata and 41.2 kilometers from Kanazawa.

== Station layout ==
The station consists of one side platform and one island platform connected by a footbridge. The station has a Midori no Madoguchi staffed ticket office.

=== Platforms ===
1	■ Nanao Line	for Nanao
2	■ Nanao Line	for Tsubata and Kanazawa
3	■ Nanao Line	(starting trains)

== Adjacent stations ==
«	Service	»
Nanao Line
Minami-Hakui	-	Chiji

== History ==
The station opened on April 24, 1898. With the privatization of Japanese National Railways (JNR) on April 1, 1987, the station came under the control of JR West.

== Passenger statistics ==
In fiscal 2015, the station was used by an average of 1,289 passengers daily (boarding passengers only).

== Surrounding area ==
- National Route 159
- Hakui City Hall
- Hakui Post Office
- Hakui Elementary School
- Hakui Junior High School

== See also ==
- List of railway stations in Japan
