= Tsubata Station =

Railway station in Tsubata, Ishikawa Prefecture, Japan

Tsubata Station 津幡駅
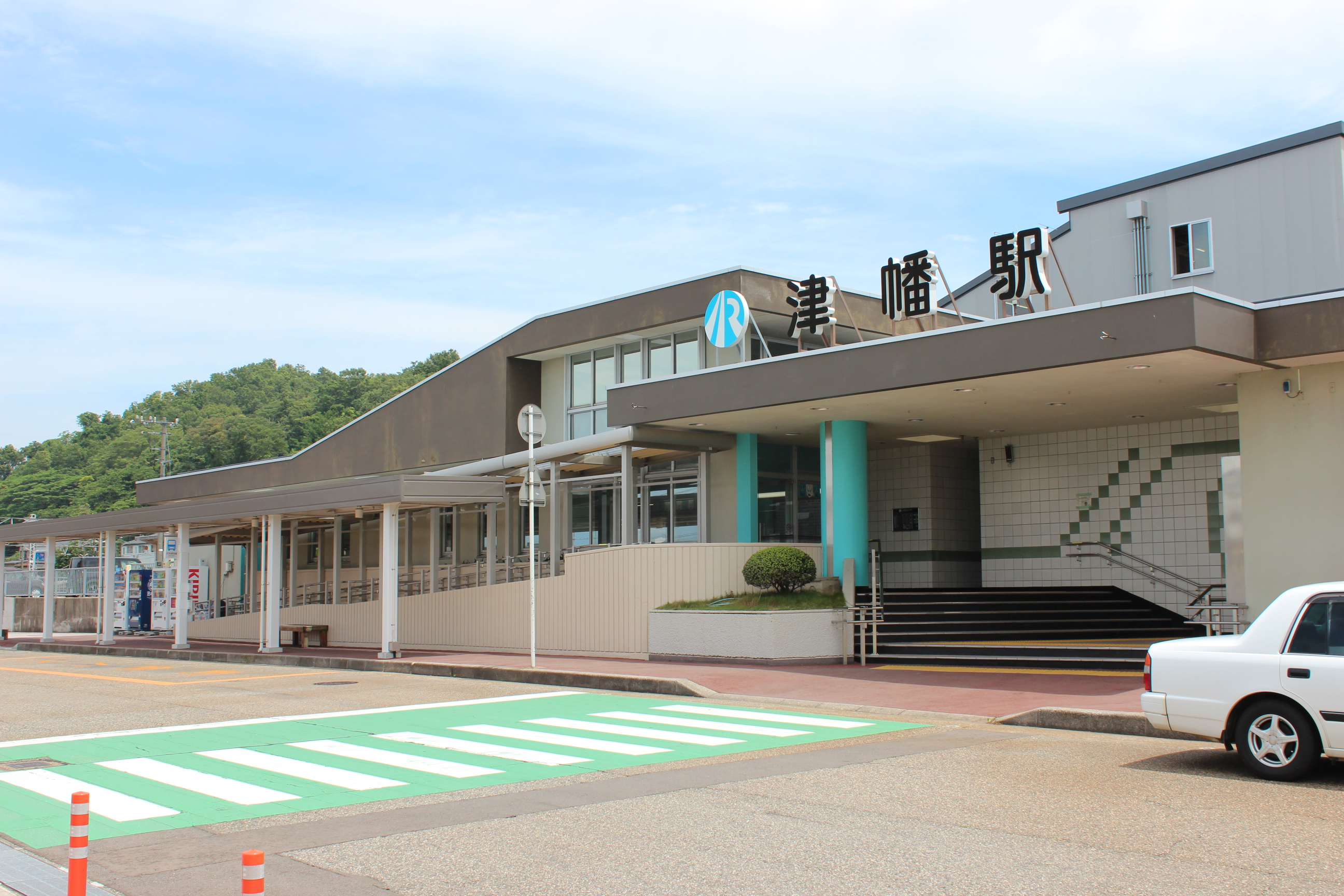
- Tsubata Station in May 2016

General information
- Location: 7 Chi, Minamichujo, Tsubata-machi, Kahoku-gun, Ishikawa-ken 929-0343; Japan
- Coordinates: 36.6576353°N 136.7302823°E
- Operator: JR West; IR Ishikawa Railway
- Lines: ■ IR Ishikawa Railway Line; ■ Nanao Line
- Distance: 11.5 km from Kanazawa
- Platforms: 2 island platforms
- Tracks: 4

Other information
- Status: Staffed (Midori no Madoguchi )
- Website: Official website

History
- Opened: 1 November 1898; 127 years ago

Passengers
- FY2015: 5,130 daily
Location
- Location within Japan

Tsubata Station (津幡駅, Tsubata-eki) is a railway station in the town of Tsubata, Kahoku District, Ishikawa, Japan, jointly operated by West Japan Railway Company (JR West) and the third-sector railway operator IR Ishikawa Railway.

== Lines ==
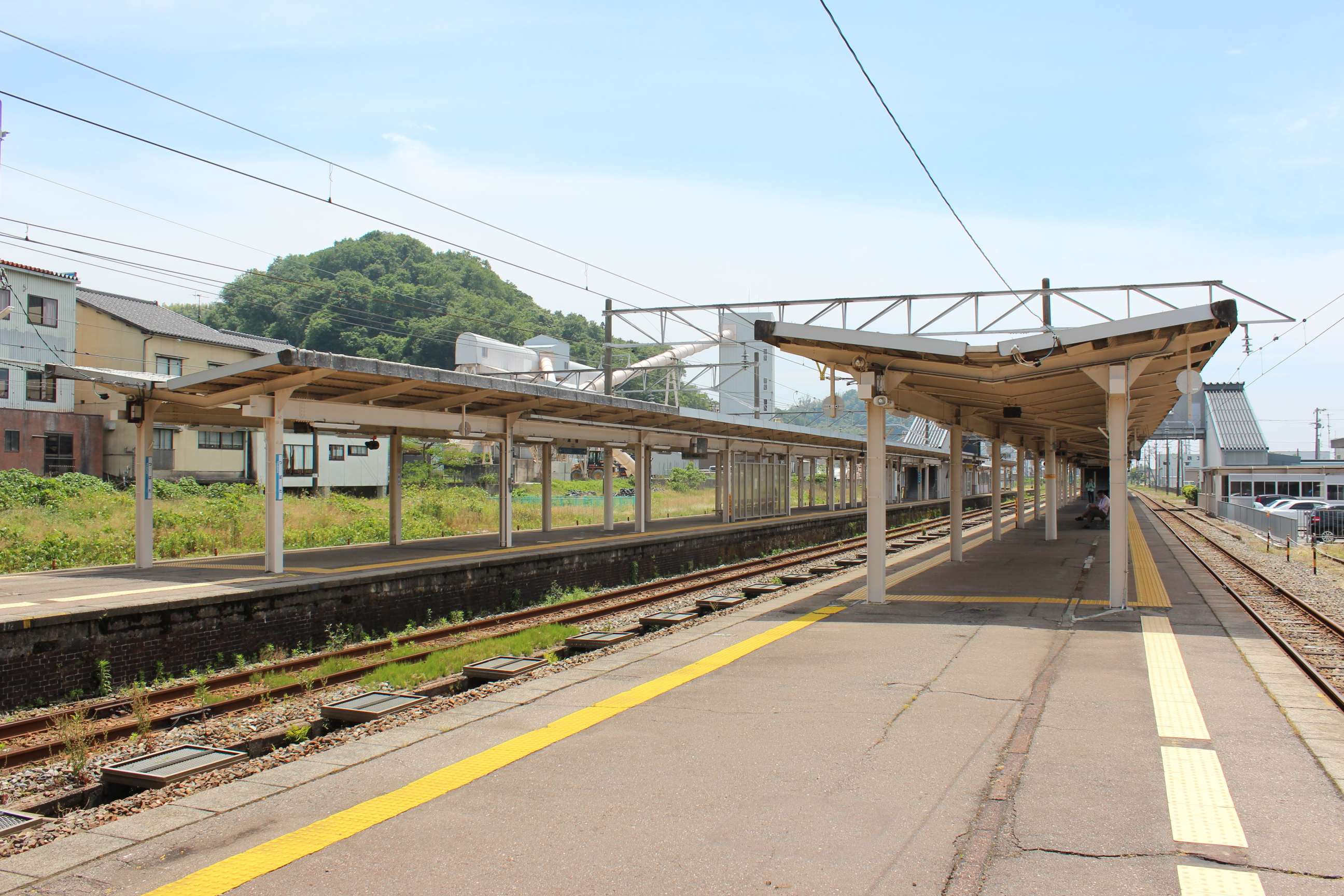
The platforms in May 2016

Tsubata Station is served by the IR Ishikawa Railway Line between Daishōji and Kurikara, and lies 11.5 km east of Kanazawa. It is also the starting point of the JR West Nanao Line to Nanao. Through trains to and from the Ainokaze Toyama Railway Line also operate over this line.

== Layout ==
The station consists of two island platforms serving four tracks, connected by a footbridge. The station has a Midori no Madoguchi staffed ticket office.

=== Platforms ===
| 1, 2 | ■ IR Ishikawa Railway Line | for Kanazawa |
| 3 | ■ IR Ishikawa Railway Line | for Takaoka and Toyama |
| 4 | ■ Nanao Line | for Hakui and Nanao |

== Adjacent stations ==
| « | Service | » |
IR Ishikawa Railway Line
| Morimoto | Local | Kurikara |
Nanao Line
| Terminus | Local | Naka-Tsubata |

== History ==
The station opened on 1 November 1898. With the privatization of Japanese National Railways (JNR) on 1 April 1987, the station came under the control of JR West. From 14 March 2015, with the opening of the Hokuriku Shinkansen extension from Nagano to Kanazawa, local passenger operations over sections of the Hokuriku Main Line running roughly parallel to the new shinkansen line were reassigned to different third-sector railway operating companies. From this date, Tsubata Station was transferred to the ownership of the third-sector operating company IR Ishikawa Railway.

== Surrounding area ==
- National Route 8
- National Route 159
- National Institute of Technology, Ishikawa College
- Chujo Elementary School

== Passenger statistics ==
In fiscal 2015, the station was used by an average of 5,130 passengers daily (boarding passengers only).

== See also ==
- List of railway stations in Japan
