= Japan National Route 159 =

National highway in Japan

National Route 159
- 国道159号
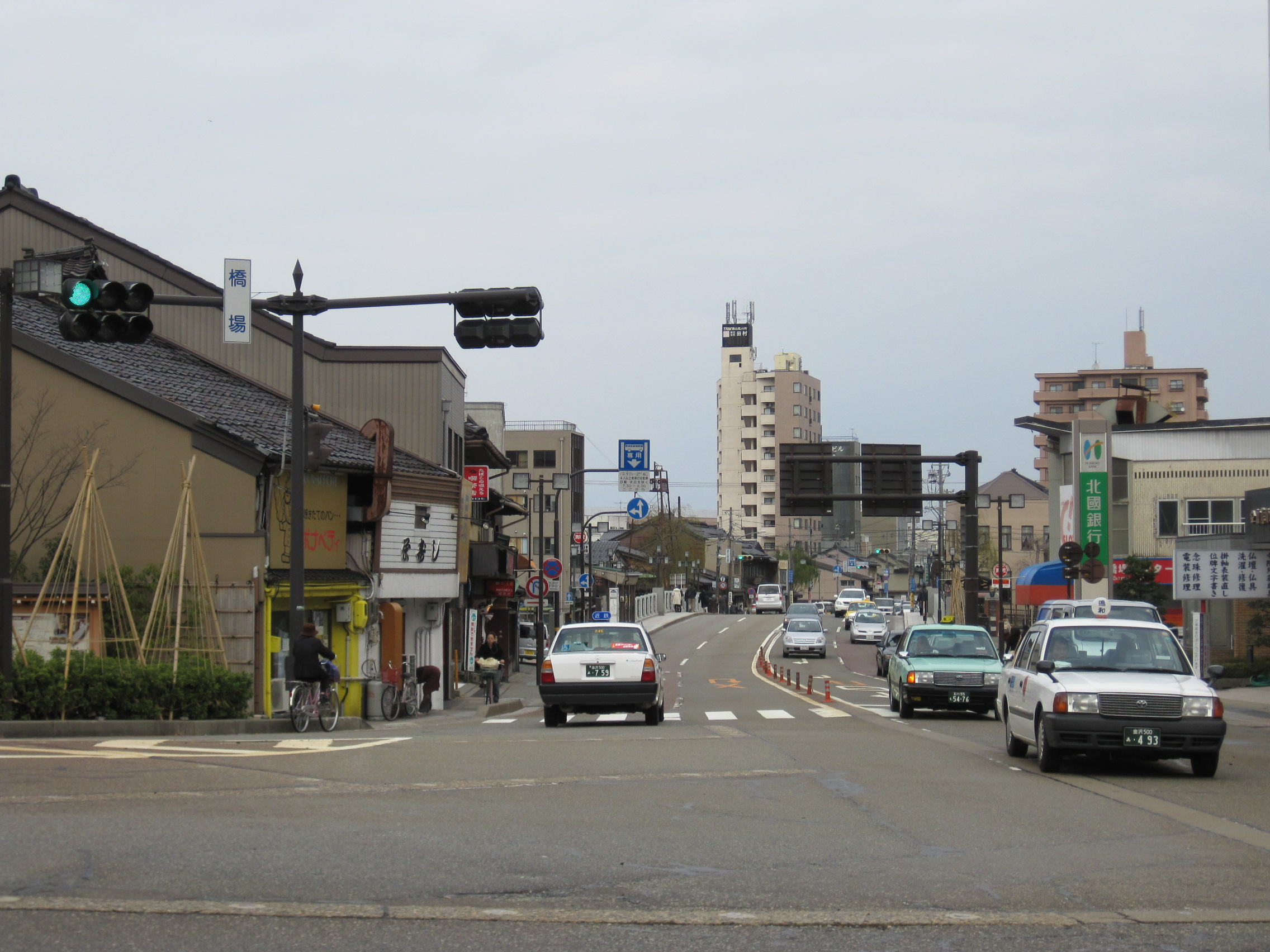

Route information
- Length: 64.8 km (40.3 mi)
- Existed: 1953–present

Major junctions
- North end: National Route 160 / National Route 249 in Nanao, Ishikawa
- South end: National Route 157 in Kanazawa, Ishikawa

Location
- Country: Japan

Highway system
- National highways of Japan; Expressways of Japan
← National Route 158	→ National Route 160

National Route 159 is a national highway of Japan connecting Nanao, Ishikawa and Kanazawa, Ishikawa in Japan, with a total length of 64.8 km (40.3 mi).
