= Kuri-Kawashiri Station =

Railway station located in Noto, Ishikawa Prefecture, Japan

Kuri-Kawashiri Station 九里川尻駅
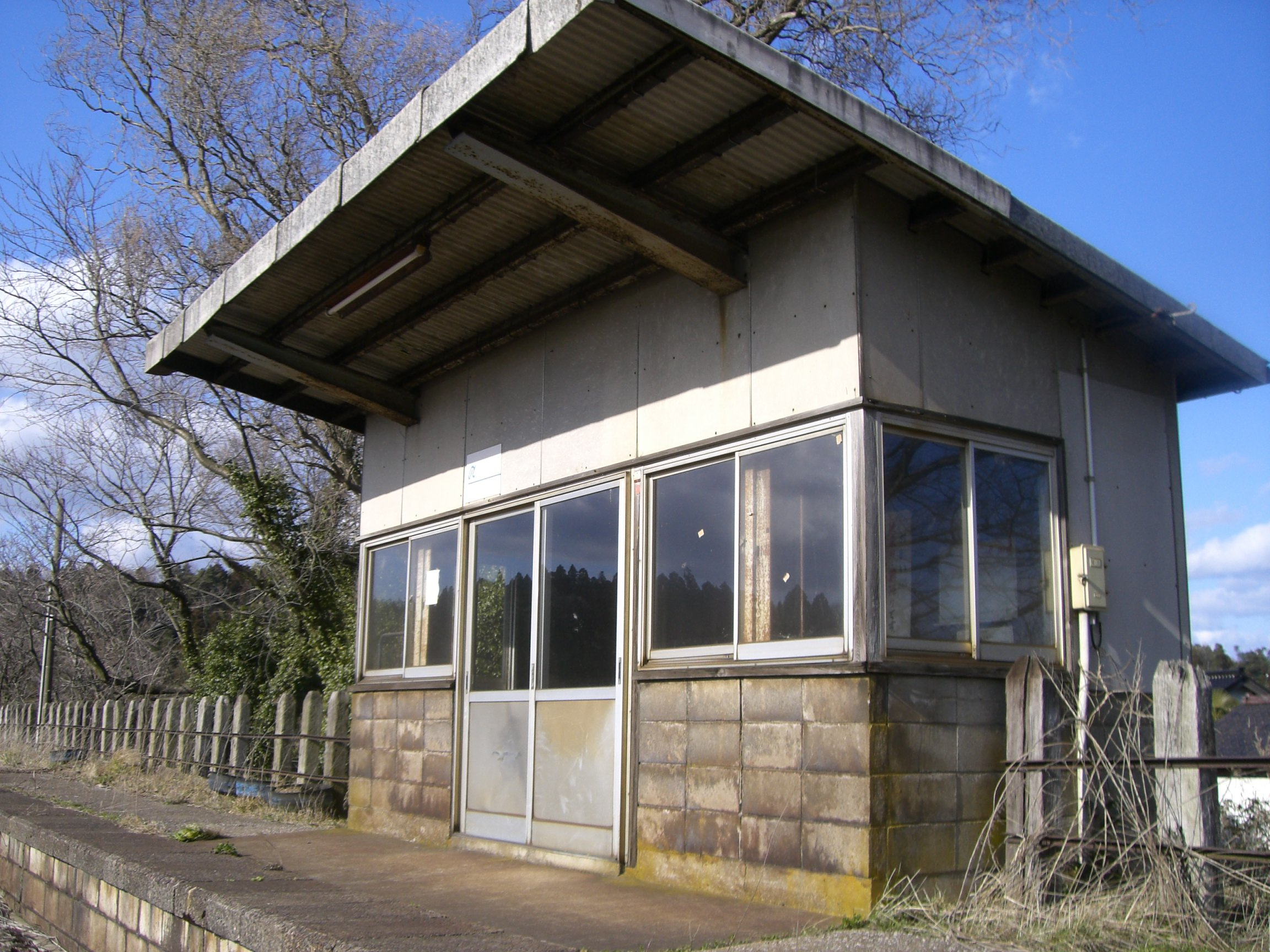
- Kuri-Kawashiri, March 2007

General information
- Location: Aza Kurikawashiri, Noto-chō, Hōshu-gun, Ishikawa-ken 927-0604; Japan
- Coordinates: 37°20′21.5″N 137°14′41.5″E
- System: Noto Railway commuter rail station
- Owner: Noto Railway
- Operator: Noto Railway
- Line: Noto Line
- Distance: 44.5 km (27.7 miles) from Anamizu
- Platforms: 1 side platform
- Tracks: 1
- Train operators: Noto Railway

Construction
- Structure type: At grade
- Accessible: None

Other information
- Status: Unstaffed

History
- Opened: 1 October 1963
- Closed: 1 April 2005
- Former names: Noto Kawashiri (1963-1988)
Services
| Preceding station | Noto Railway | Following station |
Noto Railway Noto Line
| Shiromaru; Toward Anamizu | - | Matsunami; Toward Takojima |
Location
- Location within Ishikawa Prefecture Location within Japan

Kuri-Kawashiri Station (九里川尻駅, Kuri-kawashiri-eki) was a railway station located in Noto, Hōsu District, Ishikawa Prefecture, Japan. This station was abandoned on April 1, 2005.

== Line ==
- Noto Railway
  - Noto Line

== Adjacent stations ==
| « | Service | » |
Noto Railway Noto Line
| Shiromaru | - | Matsunami |
