= Matsunami =

Matsunami (written: 松波 or 松浪) is a Japanese surname. Notable people with the surname include:

- Kenshiro Matsunami (松浪 健四郎, born 1946), Japanese politician
- Kenta Matsunami (松浪 健太, born 1971), Japanese politician
- Masanobu Matsunami (松波 正信, born 1974), Japanese footballer and manager

== See also ==
- Matsunami Station, a former railway station in Noto, Hōsu District, Ishikawa Prefecture, Japan
