= 上戸駅 =

上戸駅 is the name of multiple train stations in Japan:

- Jōko Station
- Uedo Station
