= Yanami =

Yanami (written: 八並 or 八奈見) is a Japanese surname. Notable people with the surname include:

- Eiko Yanami (八並 映子, 1948–2017), Japanese actress
- Jōji Yanami (八奈見 乗児, 1931–2021), Japanese voice actor

== See also ==
- Yanami Station, a railway station in Noto, Ishikawa Prefecture, Japan
