= Fujinami =

Fujinami may refer to:

== People ==
- Akari Fujinami (藤波 朱理; born 2003), Japanese freestyle wrestler
- Kiyoto Fujinami (藤波 清斗; born 1995), Japanese professional racing driver
- Shintaro Fujinami (藤浪 晋太郎; born 1994), Japanese baseball player
- Takahisa Fujinami (藤波 貴久; born 1980), Japanese motorcycle rider
- Takao Fujinami (藤波 孝生; 1932–2007), Japanese politician
- Tatsumi Fujinami (藤波 辰巳; born 1953), Japanese professional wrestler
- Yuhi Fujinami (藤波 勇飛; born 1996), Japanese freestyle wrestler
- Ryunosuke Fujinami, fictional character from the manga series Urusei Yatsura

== Others ==
- Fujinami Station (disambiguation)
- Japanese destroyer Fujinami
