= HANE =

HANE may refer to:

- Hereditary angioneurotic edema, a rare genetic disease
- High-altitude nuclear explosion

== See also ==
- Hane (disambiguation)
