= Bira Station =

Former railway station in Anamizu, Ishikawa prefecture, Japan

Coordinates: 37°14′7.6″N 136°58′6.5″E

Bira Station 比良駅
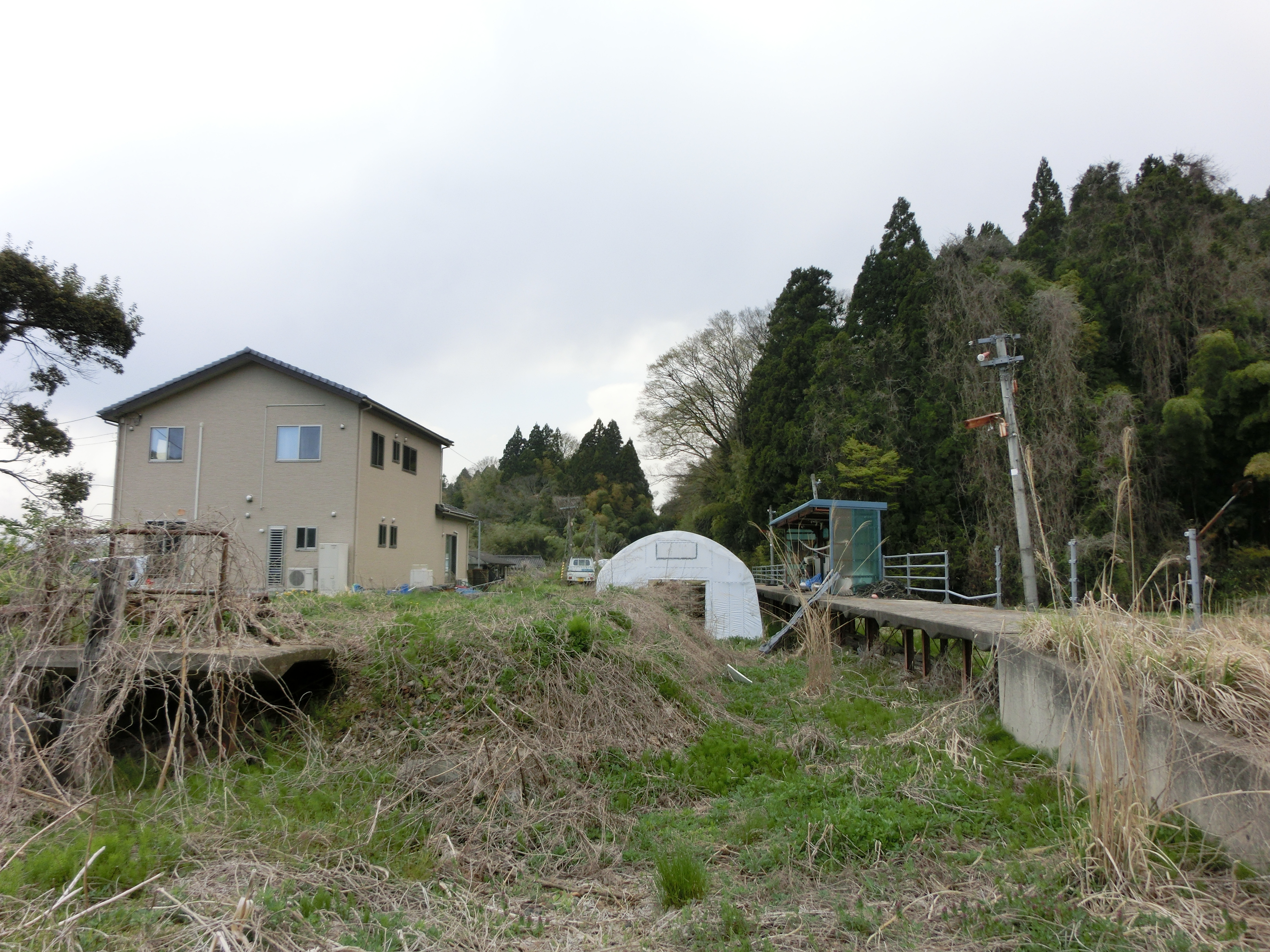
- Station site in 2017

General information
- Location: Anamizu, Hōsu District, Ishikawa Prefecture; Japan
- Operator: Noto Railway
- Line: Noto Line

History
- Closed: April 1, 2005
Location

Bira Station (比良駅, Bira-eki) was a railway station located in Anamizu, Hōsu District, Ishikawa Prefecture, Japan. This station was abandoned on April 1, 2005.

== Line ==
- Noto Railway
  - Noto Line

== Adjacent stations ==
«	Service	»
Noto Railway Noto Line
Nakai	-	Kanami
