= Ukawa Station =

Railway station in Japan

Coordinates: 37°15′27.1″N 137°4′51.2″E

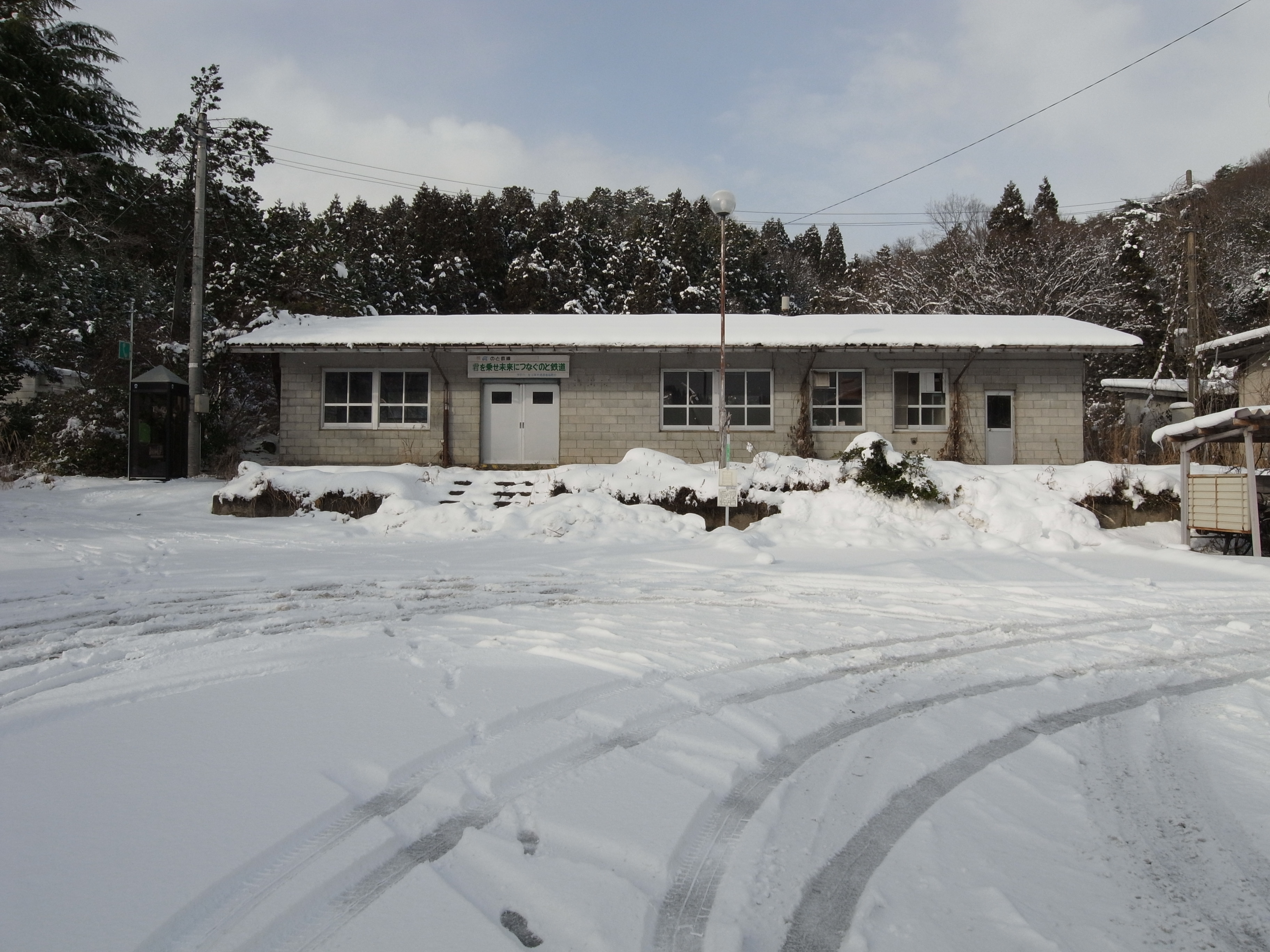
Former station building, January 2013

Ukawa Station (鵜川駅, Ukawa-eki) was a railway station located in Noto, Ishikawa, Japan. This station was abandoned on April 1, 2005 when the line was discontinued.

== Line ==
- Noto Railway
  - Noto Line

== Adjacent stations ==
«	Service	»
Noto Railway Noto Line
Furukimi	-	Shichimi
