= Ushitsu Station =

Railway station in Japan

Coordinates: 37°18′36.0″N 137°8′53.4″E

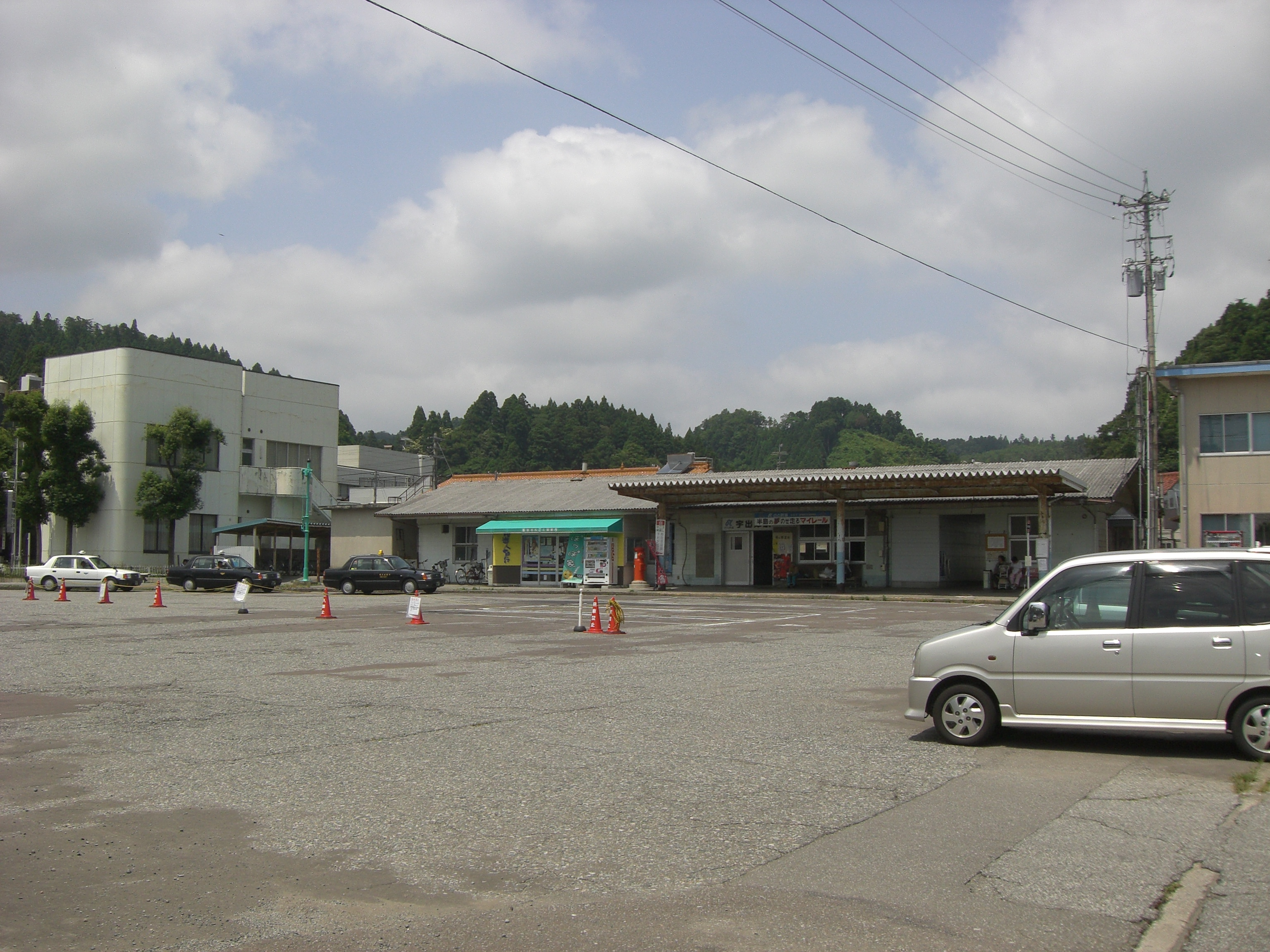
Ushitsu Station building, 2007

Ushitsu Station (宇出津駅, Ushitsu-eki) was a railway station located in Noto, Hōsu District, Ishikawa Prefecture, Japan. This station was abandoned on April 1, 2005.

== Line ==
- Noto Railway
  - Noto Line

== Adjacent stations ==
| « | Service | » |
Noto Railway Noto Line
| Fujinami | - | Hane |
