= Shōin Station =

Railway station in Suzu, Ishikawa Prefecture, Japan

Coordinates: 37°26′45.1″N 137°17′18.6″E

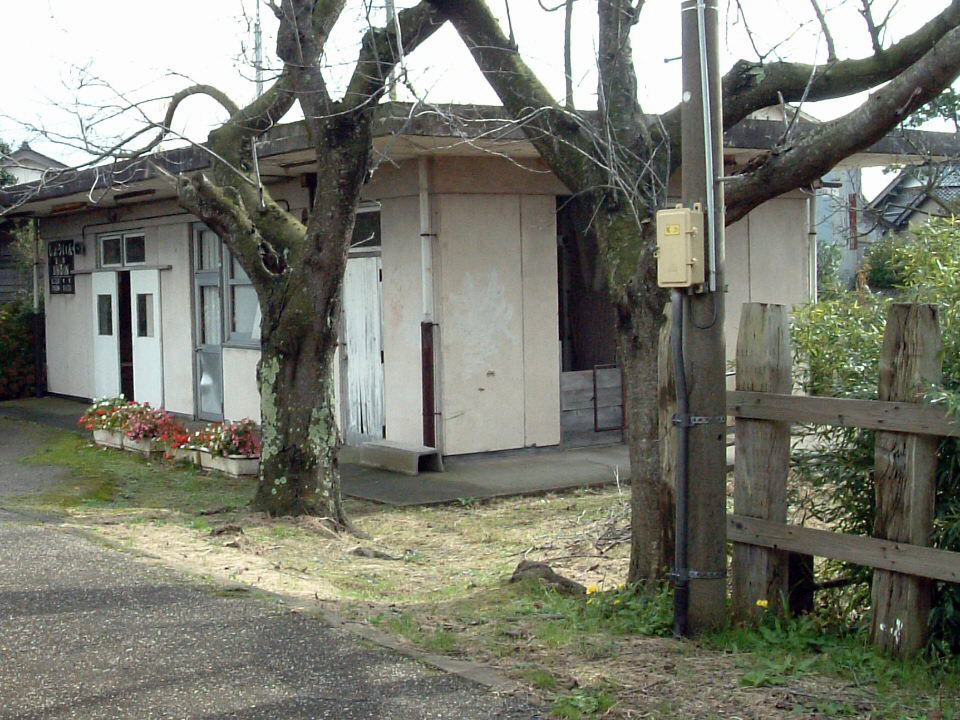
Station building seen from the platform side

Shōin Station (正院駅, Shōin-eki) was a railway station located in Suzu, Ishikawa Prefecture, Japan. This station was opened on September 21, 1964, and abandoned on April 1, 2005.

== Line ==
- Noto Railway
  - Noto Line

== Adjacent stations ==
«	Service	»
Noto Railway Noto Line
Suzu	-	Takojima
