= Ukai Station (Ishikawa) =

Former railway station in Suzu, Ishikawa prefecture, Japan

Coordinates: 37°24′7.0″N 137°14′15.6″E

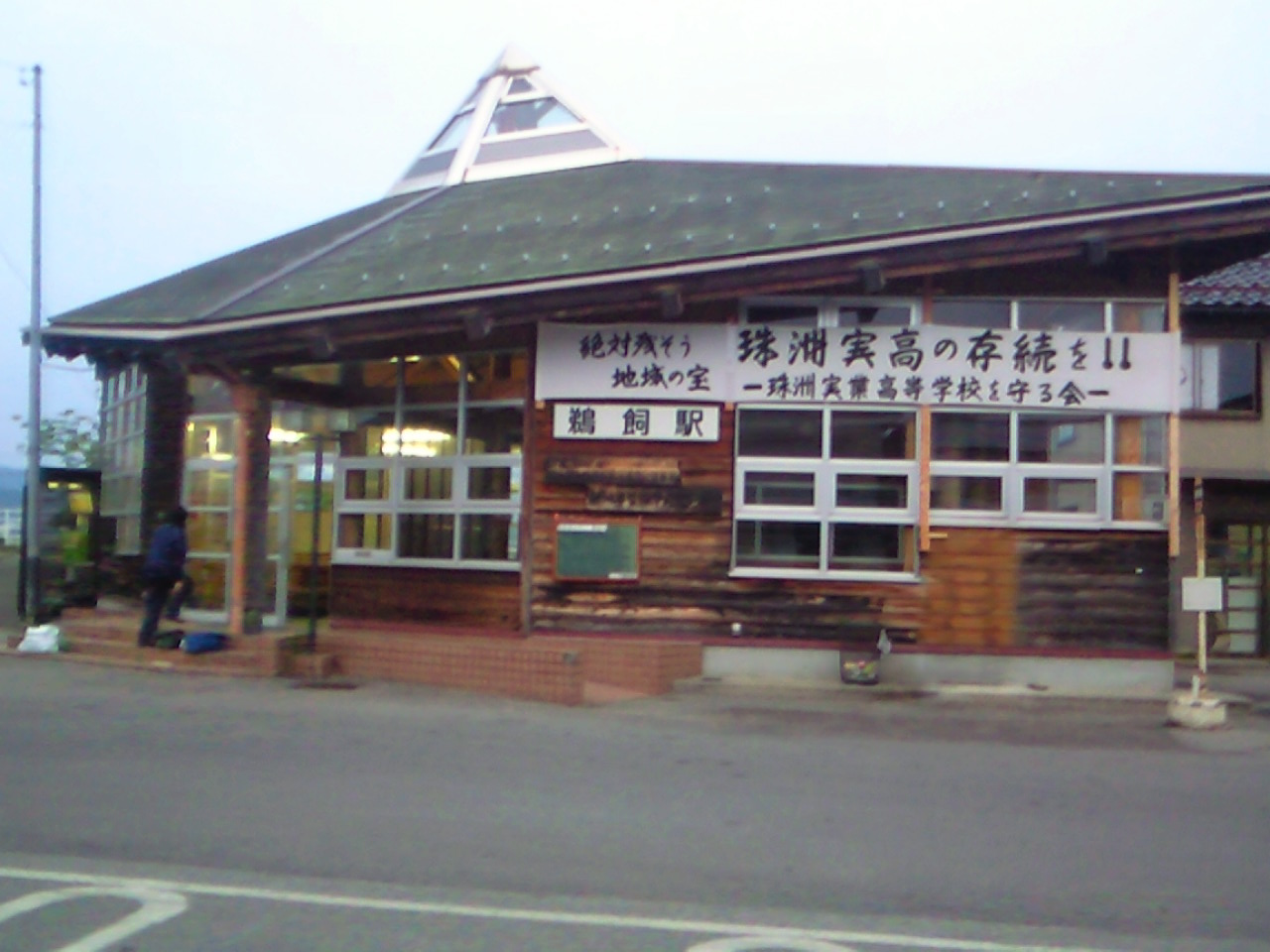
Former station building in 2008

Ukai Station (鵜飼駅, Ukai-eki) was a railway station located in Suzu, Ishikawa Prefecture, Japan. This station was abandoned on April 1, 2005.

== Line ==
- Noto Railway
  - Noto Line

== Adjacent stations ==
«	Service	»
Noto Railway Noto Line
Minami-Kuromaru	-	Uedo

== Events ==
From over 70 proposals received, artwork by Hong Kong artist Dylan Kwok has been selected to be displayed at the former station building as part of the Station by the Sea at Oku-Noto Triennale - Residence and Exhibition Programme, held from September 4 until October 24, 2021.
