= Ushima Station =

Railway station in Suzu, Ishikawa, Japan

Coordinates: 37°22′42.1″N 137°14′8.0″E

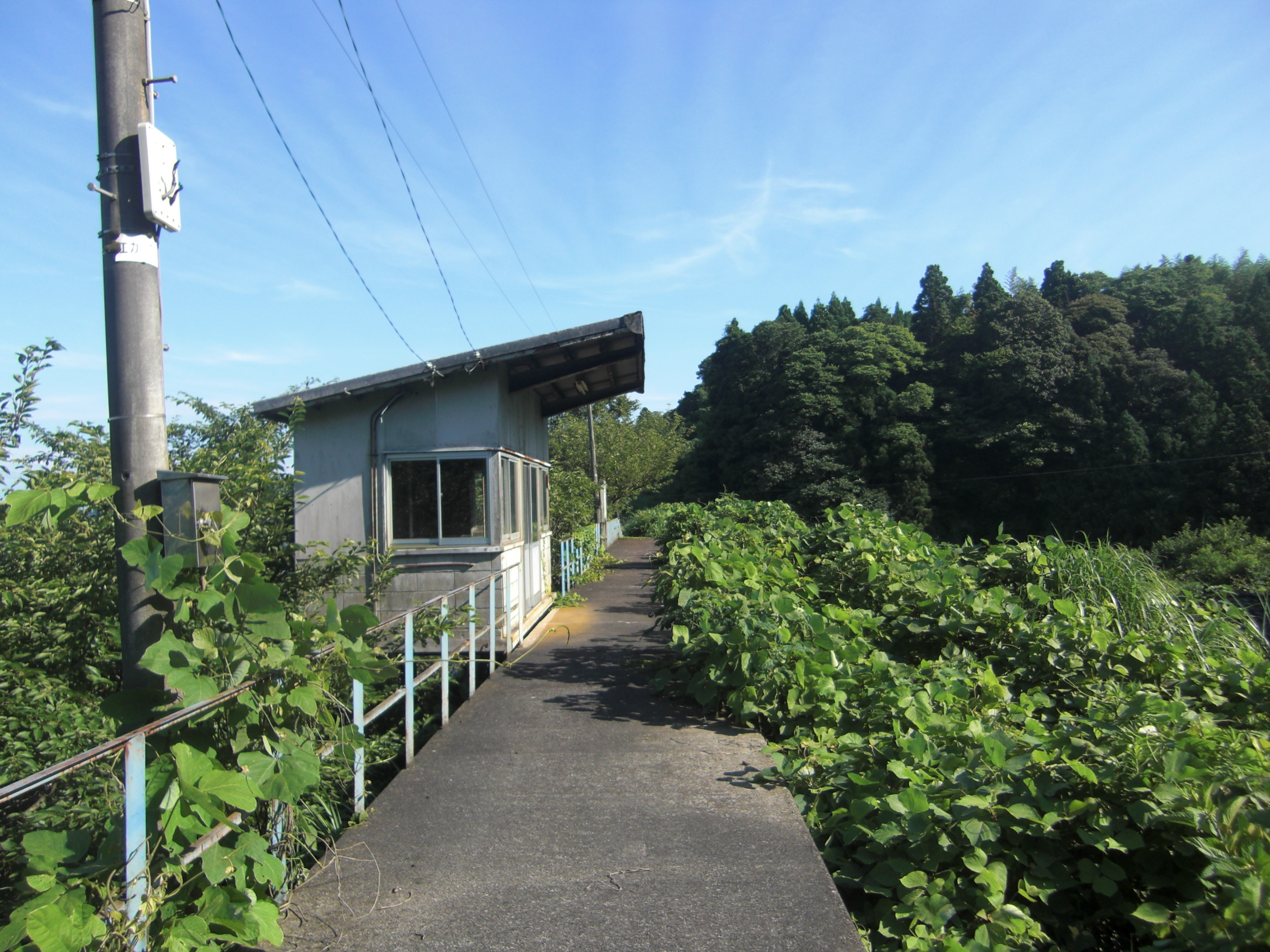
Abandoned platform, July 2010

Ushima Station (鵜島駅, Ushima-eki) was a railway station located in Suzu, Ishikawa Prefecture, Japan. This station was abandoned on April 1, 2005.

== Line ==
- Noto Railway
  - Noto Line

== Adjacent stations ==
«	Service	»
Noto Railway Noto Line
Koiji	-	Minami-Kuromaru
