= Okinami Station =

Railway station in Anamizu, Japan

Coordinates: 37°12′47.7″N 137°3′4.3″E

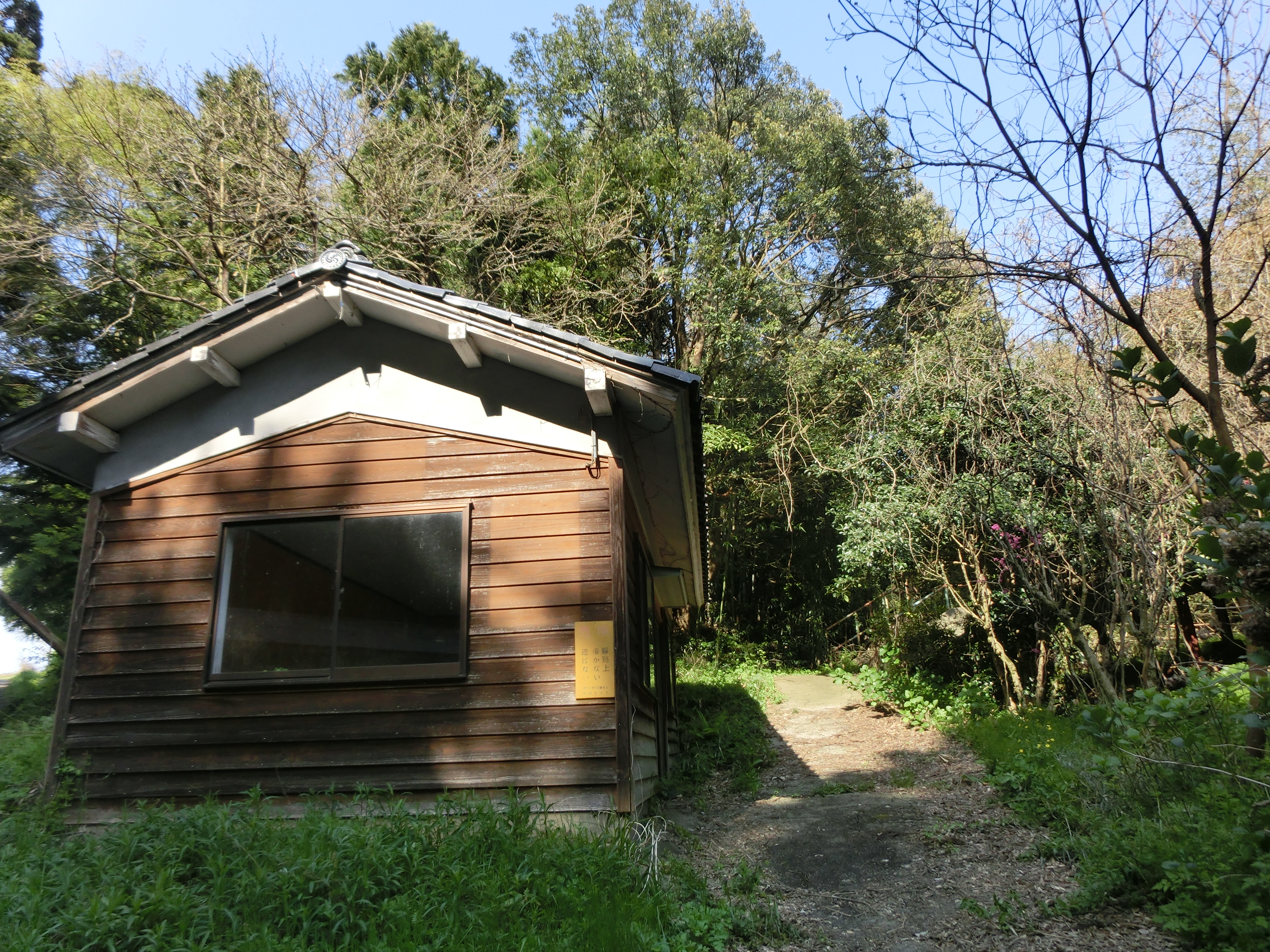
Okinami station waiting room after abolition

Okinami Station (沖波駅, Okinami-eki) was a railway station located in Anamizu, Hōsu District, Ishikawa Prefecture, Japan. This station was abandoned on April 1, 2005.

== Line ==
- Noto Railway
  - Noto Line

== Adjacent stations ==
«	Service	»
Noto Railway Noto Line
Kabuto	-	Maenami
