= Noto Line =

Railway line in Japan

Noto Railway Noto Line
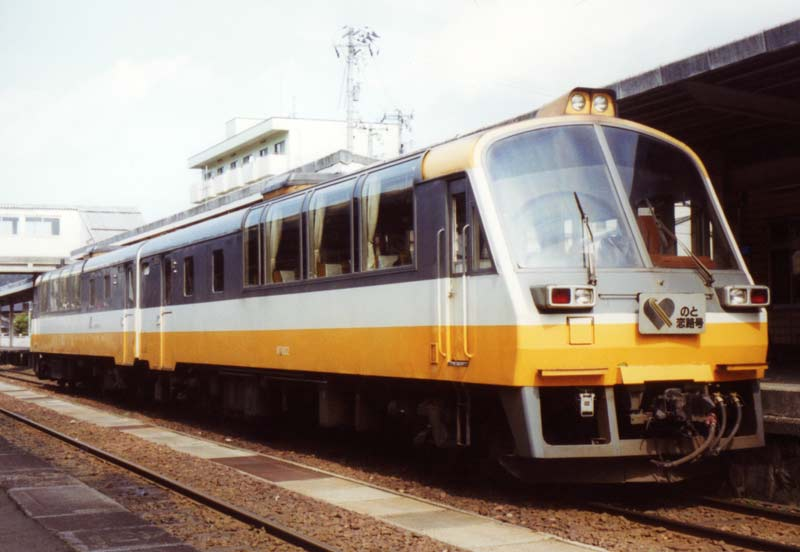
- Noto railway NT800

Overview
- Status: Ceased operation
- Owner: Noto Railway
- Locale: Ishikawa Prefecture
- Termini: Anamizu; Takojima
- Stations: 30

Service
- Operator(s): Noto Railway
- Rolling stock: NT100 series DMU, NT800 series DMU, KiHa 58 series DMU

History
- Opened: 1959
- Closed: 2005

Technical
- Line length: 61.0 km (37.9 mi)
- Number of tracks: Entire line single-tracked
- Character: Rural
- Track gauge: 1,067 mm (3 ft 6 in)
- Electrification: None
- Operating speed: 80 km/h (50 mph)

The Noto Line (能登線, Noto-sen) was a Japanese railway line of Noto Railway in Ishikawa Prefecture, between Anamizu Station in Anamizu, Hōsu District and Takojima Station in Suzu. This railway line closed on April 1, 2005.

== Line data ==
- Length: 61 km
- Rail gauge: 1,067 mm (3 ft 6 in)
- Number of stations: 30
- Double Track: None (single track)
- Electrified Section: None (non electrified)

== History ==
The first 22.9-km section of the Noto Line of Japanese National Railways (JNR) between Anamizu Station and Ukawa Station opened on June 15, 1959. It was extended 9.9 km to Ushitsu Station on April 17, 1960, 13.8 km to Matsunami Station on October 1, 1963 and 14.5 km to Takojima Station on September 21, 1964 completing the line of 61.1 km in total, and featuring 49 tunnels in that distance.

Following the privatization of JNR on April 1, 1987, the line was operated by West Japan Railway Company until the company transferred the operation of the line to Noto Railway on March 25, 1988.

The line was closed on April 1, 2005.

== Stations ==
Name		Distance (km)			Connections	Location	
Name		Between stations	Noto Railway era	JR era	Connections	Location	
Anamizu	穴水	-	0.0	0.0	Noto Railway: Nanao Line	Anamizu, Hōsu District	Ishikawa Prefecture
Nakai	中居	5.3	5.3	5.3		Anamizu, Hōsu District	Ishikawa Prefecture
Bira	比良	2.3	7.6	7.5		Anamizu, Hōsu District	Ishikawa Prefecture
Kanami	鹿波	2.9	10.5	10.5		Anamizu, Hōsu District	Ishikawa Prefecture
Kabuto	甲	3.8	14.3	14.3		Anamizu, Hōsu District	Ishikawa Prefecture
Okinami	沖波	2.7	17.0	17.0		Anamizu, Hōsu District	Ishikawa Prefecture
Maenami	前波	1.1	18.1	18.1		Anamizu, Hōsu District	Ishikawa Prefecture
Furukimi	古君	1.8	19.9	19.9		Anamizu, Hōsu District	Ishikawa Prefecture
Ukawa	鵜川	3.0	22.9	22.9		Noto, Hōsu District	Ishikawa Prefecture
Shichimi	七見	1.2	24.1	---		Noto, Hōsu District	Ishikawa Prefecture
Yanami	矢波	1.5	25.6	25.6		Noto, Hōsu District	Ishikawa Prefecture
Hanami	波並	2.2	27.8	27.8		Noto, Hōsu District	Ishikawa Prefecture
Fujinami	藤波	2.2	30.0	30.0		Noto, Hōsu District	Ishikawa Prefecture
Ushitsu	宇出津	2.7	32.7	32.8		Noto, Hōsu District	Ishikawa Prefecture
Hane	羽根	2.6	35.3	35.4		Noto, Hōsu District	Ishikawa Prefecture
Oura	小浦	1.7	37.0	37.1		Noto, Hōsu District	Ishikawa Prefecture
Jōmon-Mawaki	縄文真脇	1.4	38.4	38.5		Noto, Hōsu District	Ishikawa Prefecture
Tsukumowan-Ogi	九十九湾小木	2.0	40.4	40.5		Noto, Hōsu District	Ishikawa Prefecture
Shiromaru	白丸	2.1	42.5	42.6		Noto, Hōsu District	Ishikawa Prefecture
Kuri-Kawashiri	九里川尻	1.9	44.4	44.5		Noto, Hōsu District	Ishikawa Prefecture
Matsunami	松波	2.0	46.4	46.6		Noto, Hōsu District	Ishikawa Prefecture
Koiji	恋路	1.8	48.2	48.3		Noto, Hōsu District	Ishikawa Prefecture
Ushima	鵜島	0.8	49.0	49.1		Suzu	Ishikawa Prefecture
Minami-Kuromaru	南黒丸	1.1	50.1	50.2		Suzu	Ishikawa Prefecture
Ukai	鵜飼	1.6	51.7	51.8		Suzu	Ishikawa Prefecture
Uedo	上戸	2.7	54.4	54.5		Suzu	Ishikawa Prefecture
Iida	飯田	1.7	56.1	56.2		Suzu	Ishikawa Prefecture
Suzu	珠洲	1.3	57.4	57.4		Suzu	Ishikawa Prefecture
Shōin	正院	1.6	59.0	59.1		Suzu	Ishikawa Prefecture
Takojima	蛸島	2.0	61.0	61.1		Suzu	Ishikawa Prefecture
