= Kanami Station =

Railway station in Japan

Coordinates: 37°12′58.0″N 136°59′22.1″E

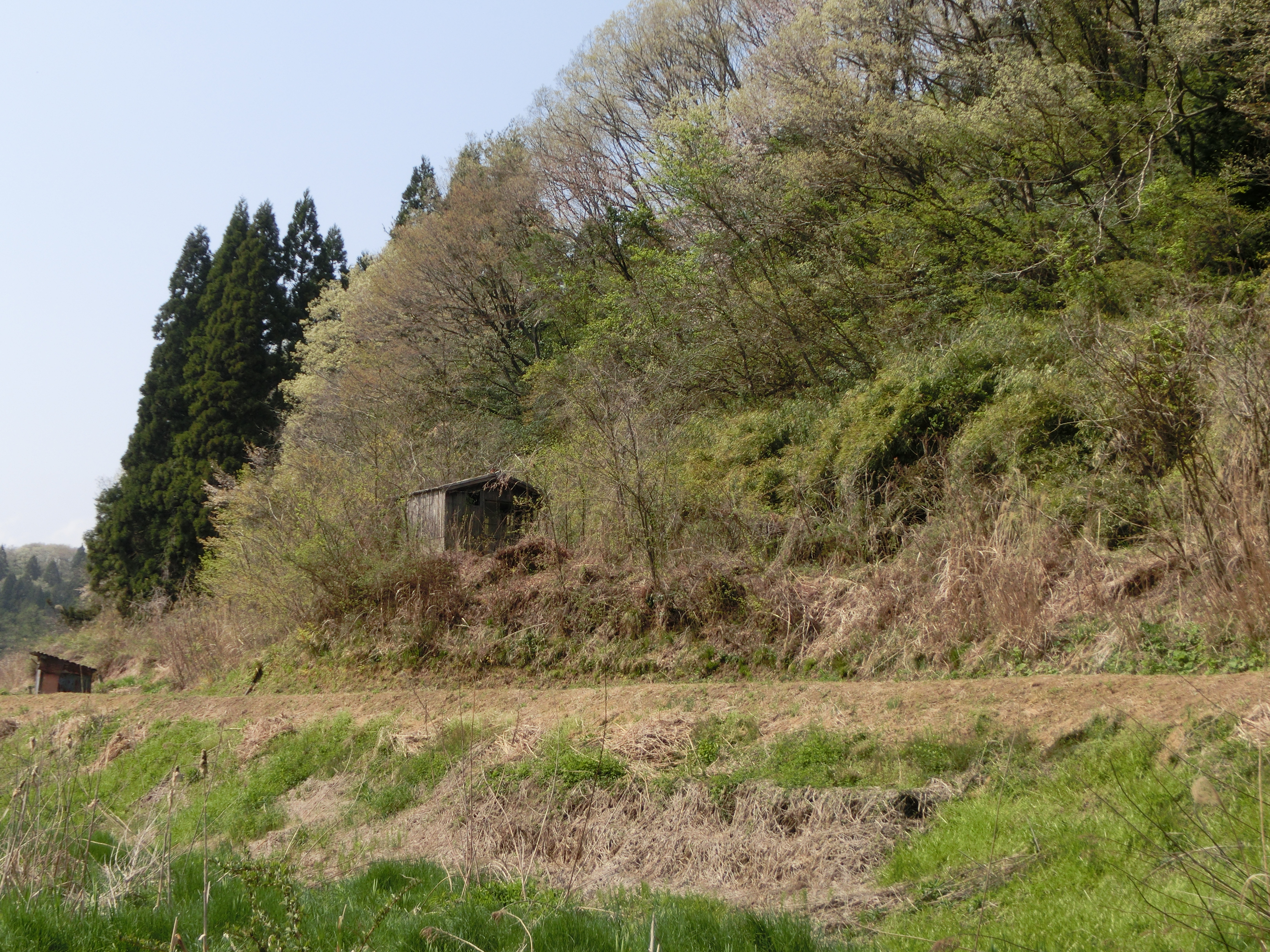
Picture of the abandoned station, taken from the road below

Kanami Station (鹿波駅, Kanami-eki) was a railway station located in Anamizu, Hōsu District, Ishikawa Prefecture, Japan. This station was abandoned on April 1, 2005.

== Line ==
- Noto Railway
  - Noto Line

== History ==
The station was opened on June 15, 1959, as part of the initial section of the Noto Line operated by the Japanese National Railways (JNR). Following the privatization of JNR on April 1, 1987, the line was operated by the West Japan Railway Company (JR West) until operation was transferred to the third-sector Noto Railway on March 25, 1988. The station was permanently closed when the Noto Line was discontinued on April 1, 2005.

== Adjacent stations ==
«	Service	»
Noto Railway Noto Line
Bira	-	Kabuto
