= Matsunami Station =

Railway station in Japan

Matsunami Station 松波駅
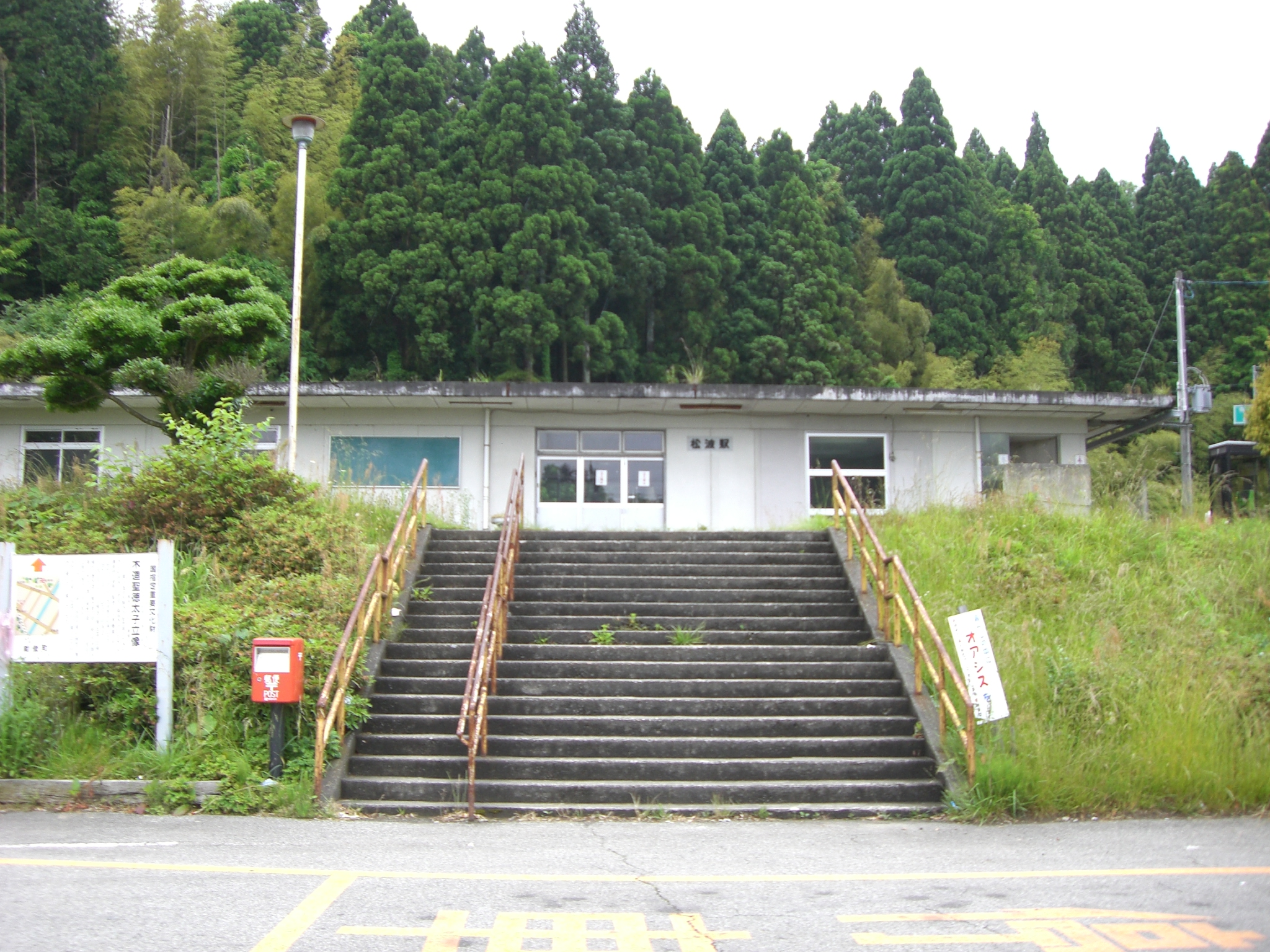
- Station building in 2007

General information
- Location: Aza Matsunami, Noto-chō, Hōshu-gun, Ishikawa-ken 927-0602; Japan
- Coordinates: 37°21′25.3″N 137°14′24.6″E
- System: Noto Railway commuter rail station
- Owner: Noto Railway
- Operator: Noto Railway
- Line: Noto Line
- Distance: 46.4 km (28.8 miles) from Anamizu
- Platforms: 1 side platform
- Tracks: 2
- Train operators: Noto Railway

Construction
- Structure type: At grade
- Accessible: None

Other information
- Status: Unstaffed

History
- Opened: 1 October 1963
- Closed: 1 April 2005
Services
Preceding station	Noto Railway	Following station
Noto Railway Noto Line
Kuri-Kawashiri; Toward Anamizu	-	Koiji; Toward Takojima
Location
- Location within Ishikawa Prefecture Location within Japan

Matsunami Station (松波駅, Matsunami-eki) was a railway station located in Noto, Hōsu District, Ishikawa Prefecture, Japan. This station was abandoned on April 1, 2005.

== Line ==
- Noto Railway
  - Noto Line

== Station layout ==
There was 1 side platform and 2 tracks.

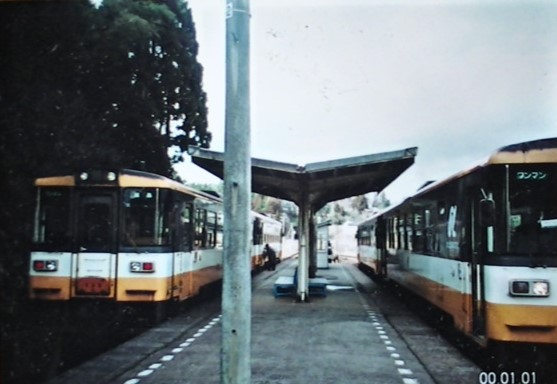
The platform when the line was in operation
track 2 (upbound, toward Anamizu) is on the right, and track 1 (downbound, toward Takojima) is on the left (March 2005)

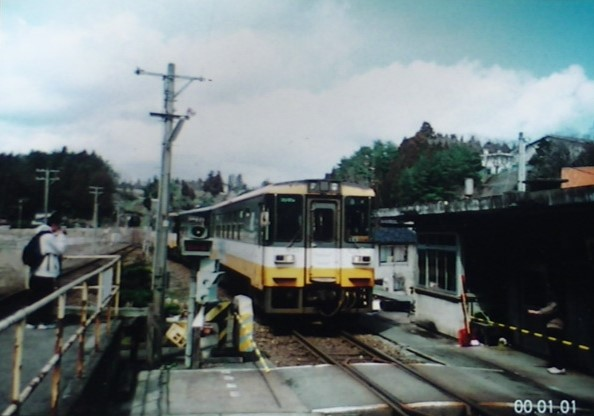
Upbound train (Toward Anamizu) entering the station
(March 2005)

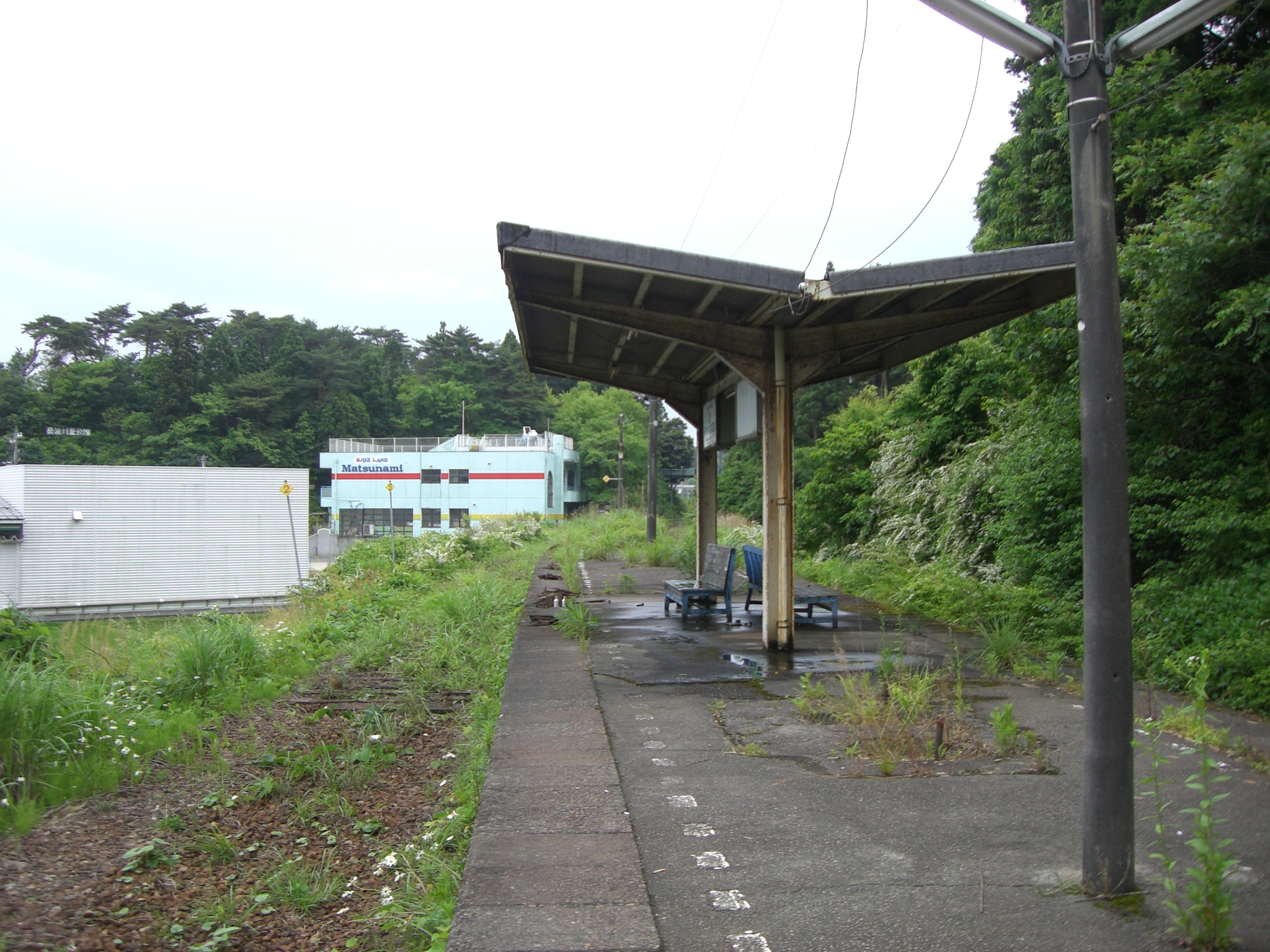
After the abolition, track 1 (upbound, toward Anamizu) is on the left and track 2 (downbound, toward Takojima) is on the right (June 2007)

=== Platforms ===
1	■ Noto Line	for Anamizu
2	■ Noto Line	for Takojima

== Adjacent stations ==
«	Service	»
Noto Railway Noto Line
Kuri-Kawashiri	-	Koiji
