= Hanami Station =

Railway station in Japan

Coordinates: 37°17′14.1″N 137°6′54.1″E

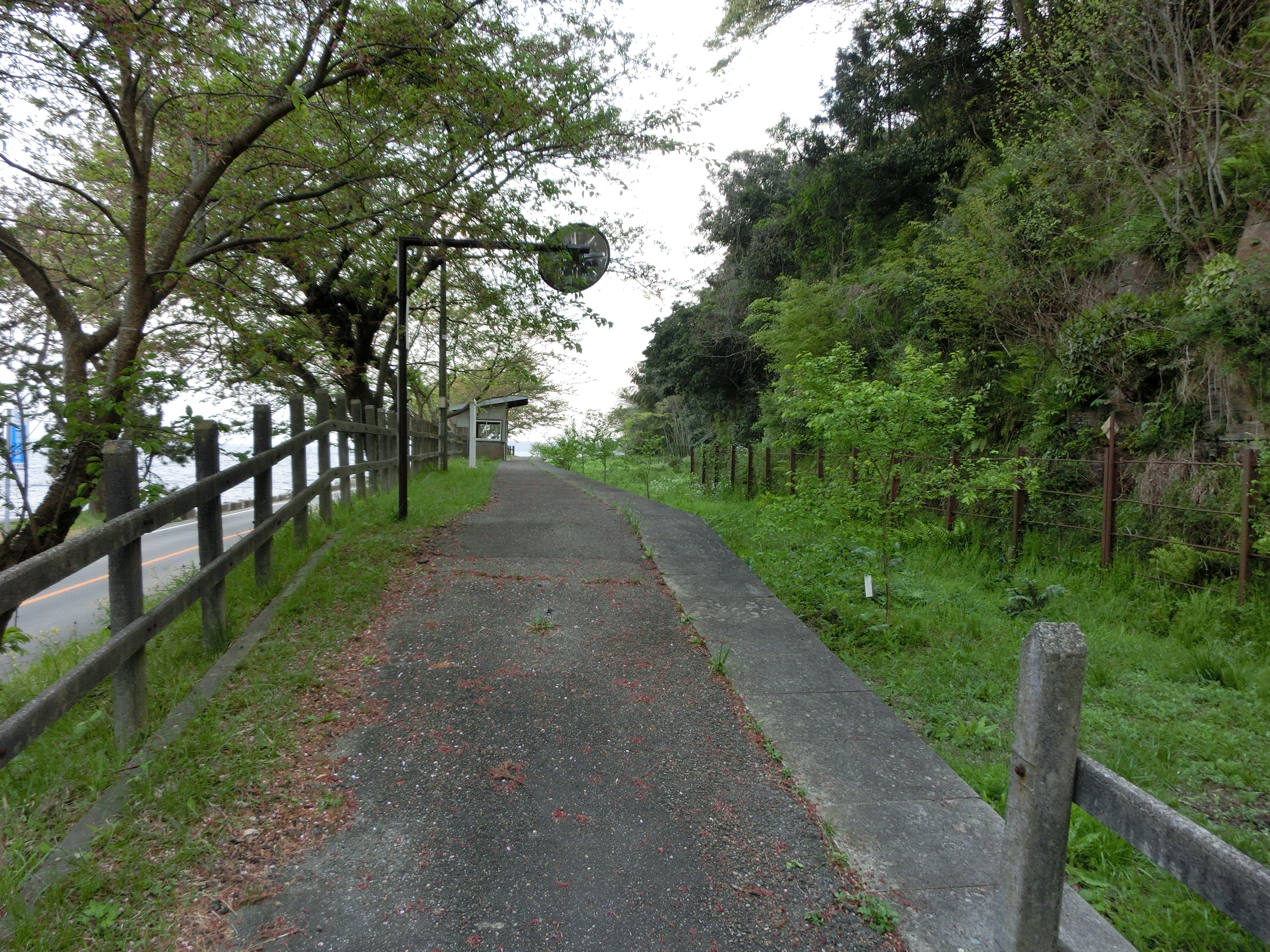
Hanami Station site

Hanami Station (波並駅, Hanami-eki) was a railway station located in Noto, Hōsu District, Ishikawa Prefecture, Japan. This station was abandoned on April 1, 2005.

== Line ==
- Noto Railway
  - Noto Line

== Adjacent stations ==
«	Service	»
Noto Railway Noto Line
Yanami	-	Fujinami
