= Shiromaru Station (Ishikawa) =

Railway station in Japan

Coordinates: 37°19′27.9″N 137°14′34.9″E

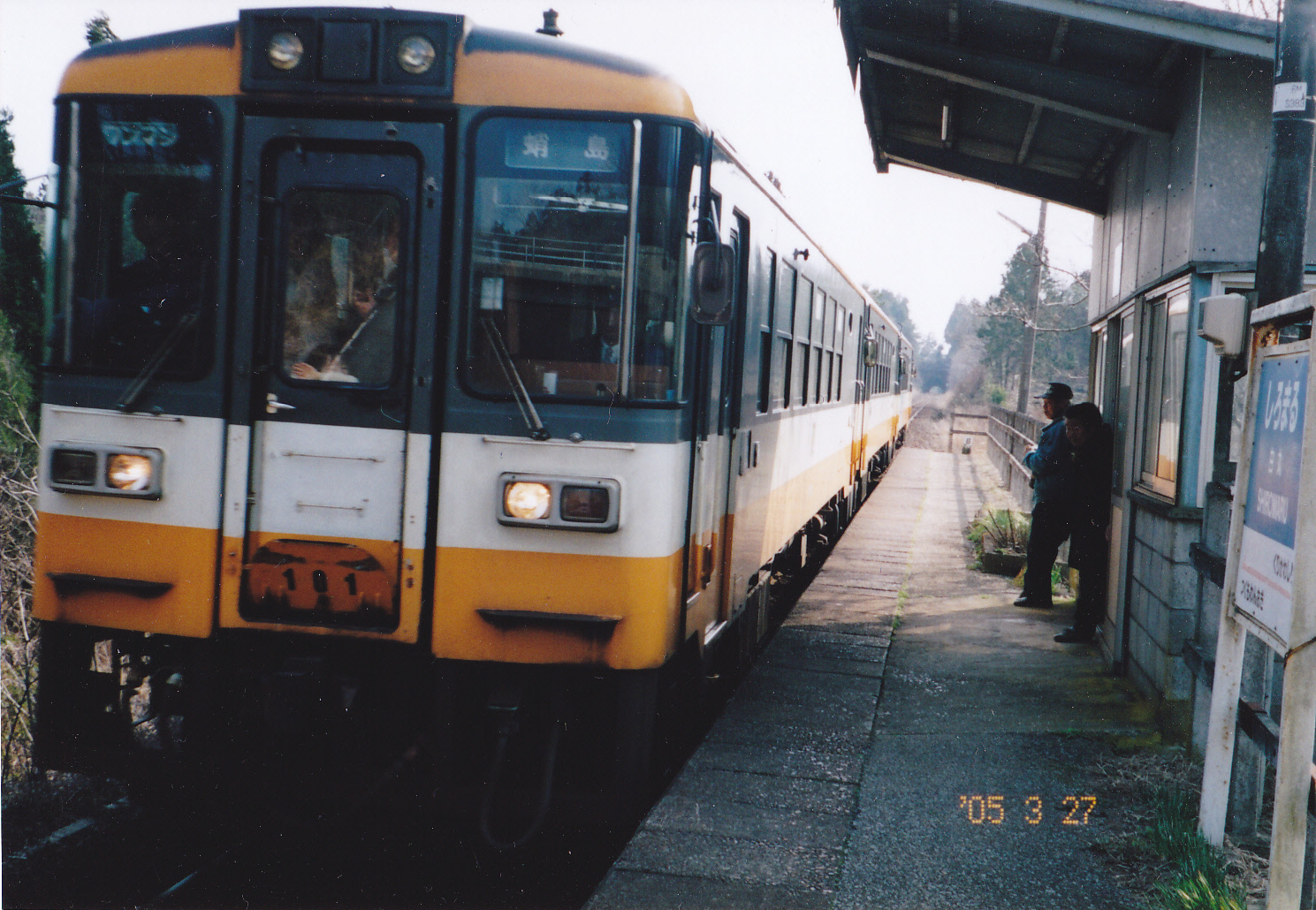
Shiromaru Station, March 2005

Shiromaru Station (白丸駅, Shiromaru-eki) was a railway station located in Noto, Hōsu District, Ishikawa Prefecture, Japan. This station was abandoned on April 1, 2005.

== Line ==
- Noto Railway
  - Noto Line

== Adjacent stations ==
«	Service	»
Noto Railway Noto Line
Tsukumowan-Ogi	-	Kuri-Kawashiri
