= Kabuto Station (Ishikawa) =

Railway station in Japan

Coordinates: 37°12′23.7″N 137°1′30.9″E

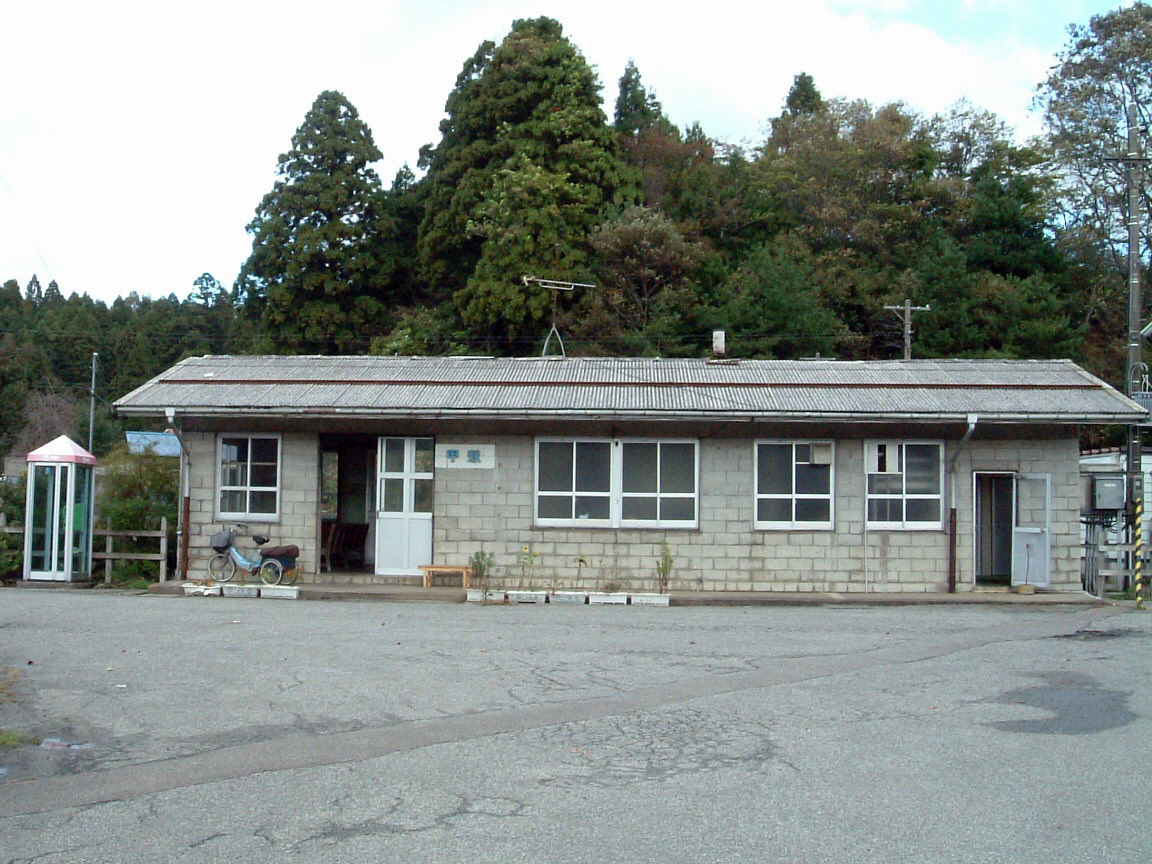
Station building, November 2004

Kabuto Station (甲駅, Kabuto-eki) was a railway station located in Anamizu, Ishikawa, Japan. This station was abandoned on April 1, 2005, when the line was discontinued.

== Line ==
- Noto Railway
  - Noto Line

== Adjacent stations ==
«	Service	»
Noto Railway Noto Line
Kanami	-	Okinami
