= Nakai Station (Ishikawa) =

Railway station in Japan

Coordinates: 37°14′4.9″N 136°56′44.2″E

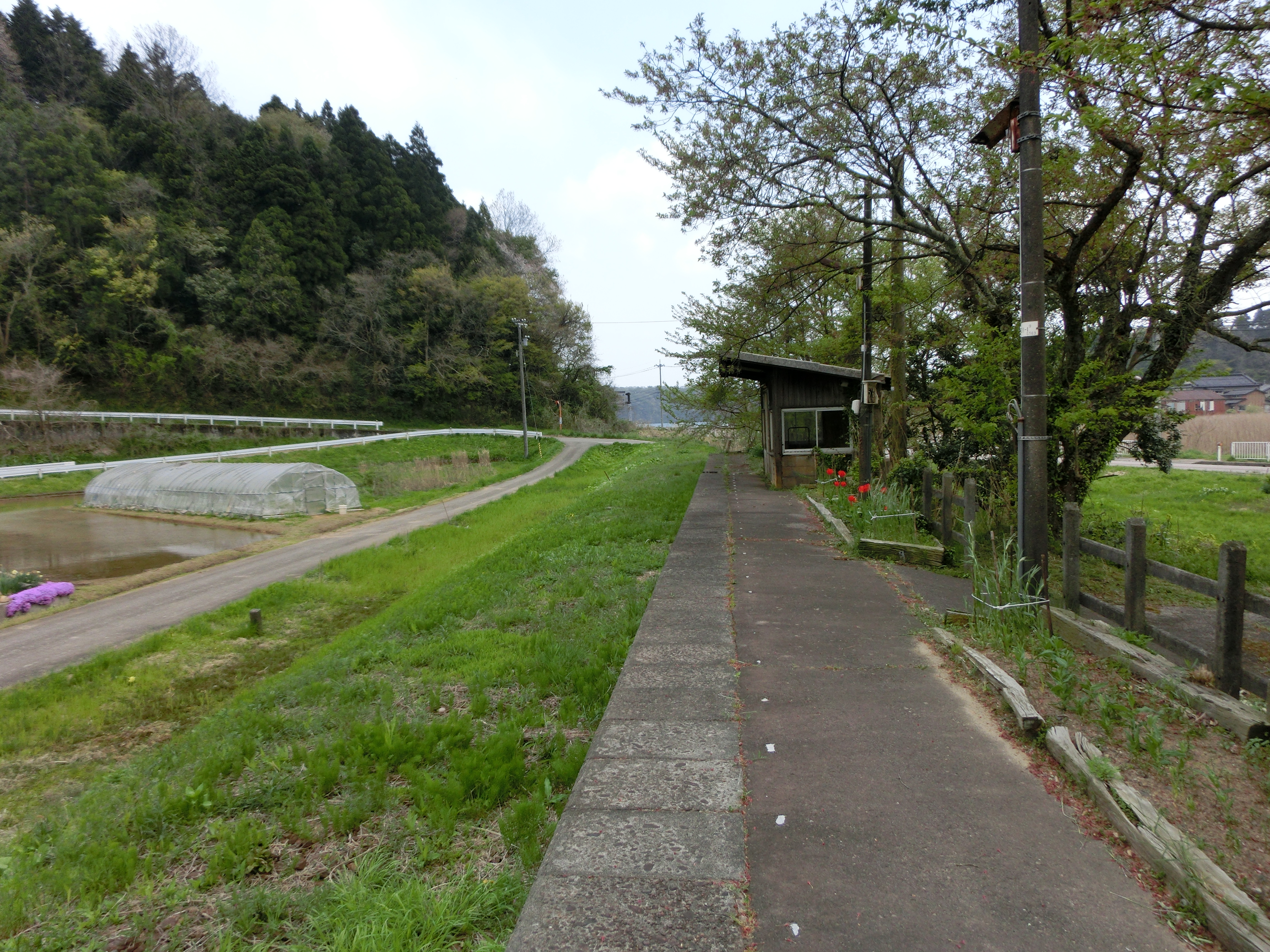
Nakai Station platform and waiting room after abolition

Nakai Station (中居駅, Nakai-eki) was a railway station located in Anamizu, Hōsu District, Ishikawa Prefecture, Japan. This station was abandoned on April 1, 2005.

== Line ==
- Noto Railway
  - Noto Line

== Adjacent stations ==
«	Service	»
Noto Railway Noto Line
Anamizu	-	Bira
