= Fujinami Station =

Fujinami Station is the name of multiple train stations in Japan:

- Fujinami Station (Wakayama) (藤並駅)
- Fujinami Station (Aichi) (藤浪駅)
- Fujinami Station (Ishikawa) (藤波駅) - closed
