= Jōmon-Mawaki Station =

Railway station in Japan

Coordinates: 37°18′13.4″N 137°12′30.6″E

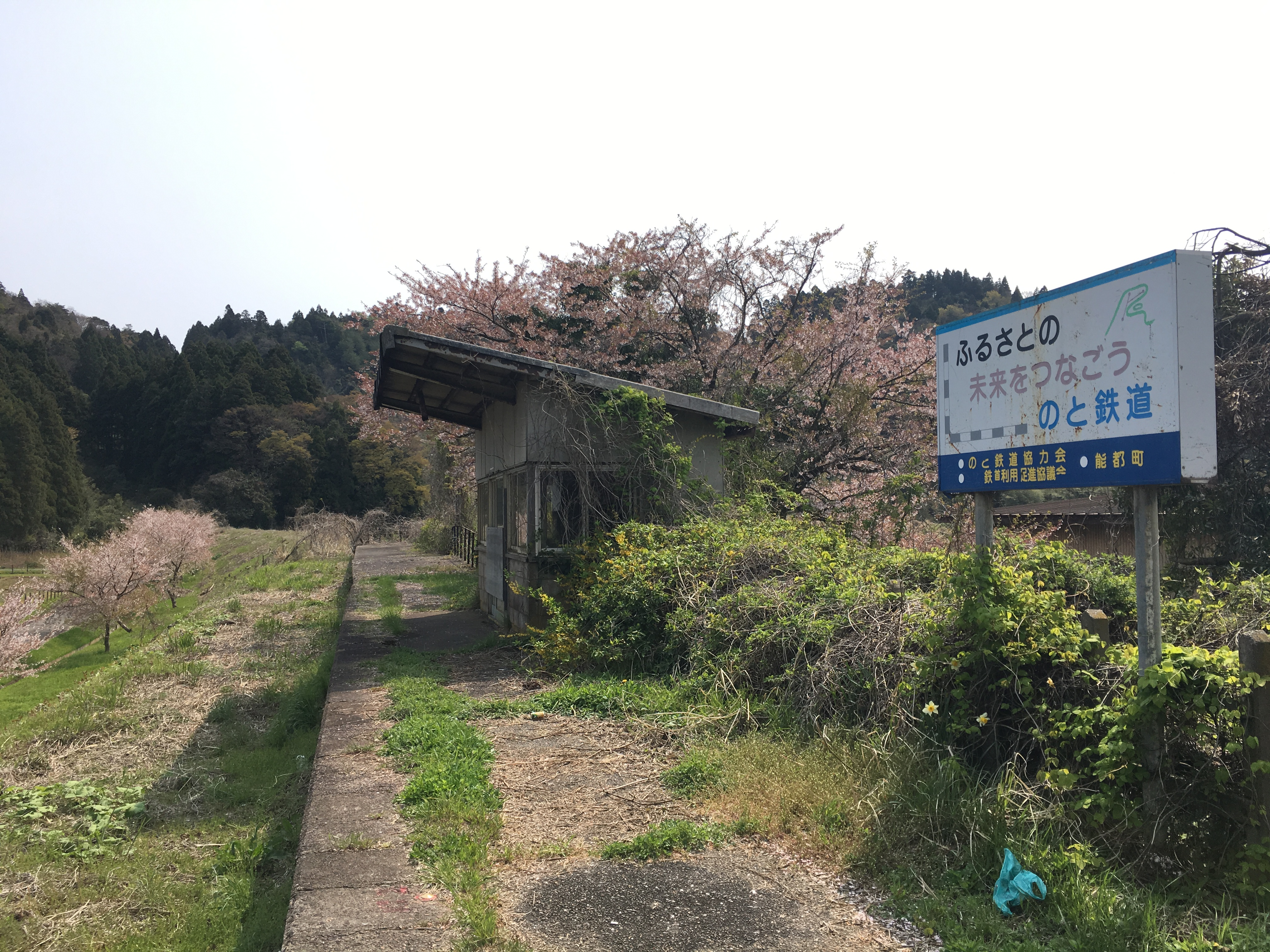
Abandoned platform, 2016

Jōmon-Mawaki Station (縄文真脇駅, Jōmon-mawaki-eki) was a railway station located in Noto, Hōsu District, Ishikawa Prefecture, Japan. This station was abandoned on April 1, 2005.

== Line ==
- Noto Railway
  - Noto Line

== Adjacent stations ==
«	Service	»
Noto Railway Noto Line
Oura	-	Tsukumowan-Ogi
