= Hane =

Hane may refer to:

- Hane, Marquesas Islands
- Hane (Go), term of the board game Go
- Hane Station, Ōda, Shimane Prefecture
- Hane Station (Ishikawa), a former railway station in Noto, Hōsu District, Ishikawa Prefecture
- Hane (Kotoko album), 2004 album by Kotoko
- Hane (Tatsuya Ishii album), 2003 album by Tatsuya Ishii
- High-altitude nuclear explosion (HANE)

== People with the surname ==
- Yasumasa Hane (羽根 泰正, born 1944), Japanese Go player
- Naoki Hane (羽根 直樹, born 1976), Japanese Go player
