= Minami-Kuromaru Station =

Railway station in Japan

Coordinates: 37°23′16.2″N 137°14′5.9″E

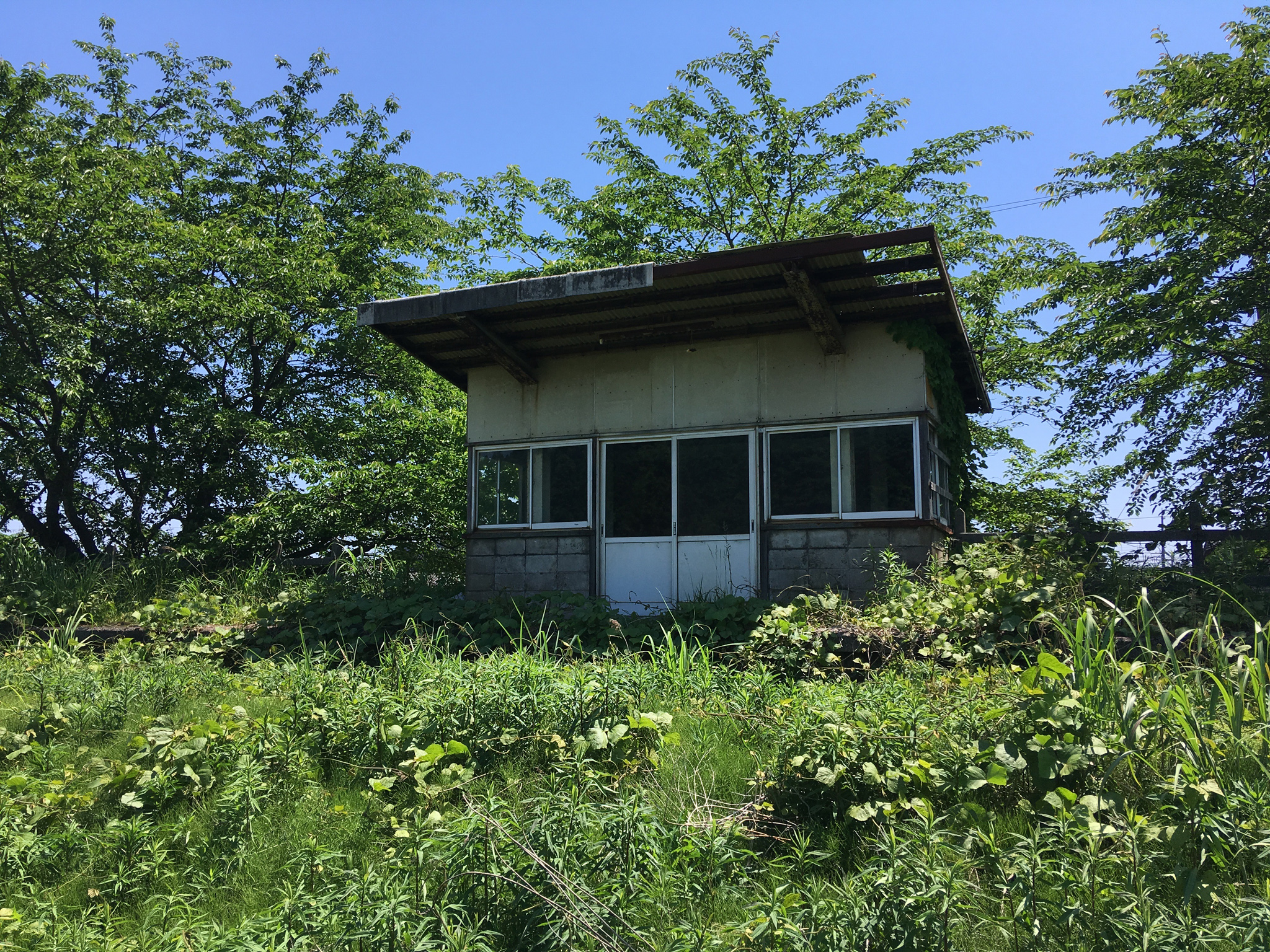
Minami-Kuromaru Station

Minami-Kuromaru Station (南黒丸駅, Minami-Kuromaru-eki) was a railway station located in Suzu, Ishikawa Prefecture, Japan. This station was abandoned on April 1, 2005.

== Line ==
- Noto Railway
  - Noto Line

== Adjacent stations ==
«	Service	»
Noto Railway Noto Line
Ushima	-	Ukai
