= Tsukumowan-Ogi Station =

Disused railway station in Japan

Coordinates: 37°18′39.3″N 137°13′41.7″E

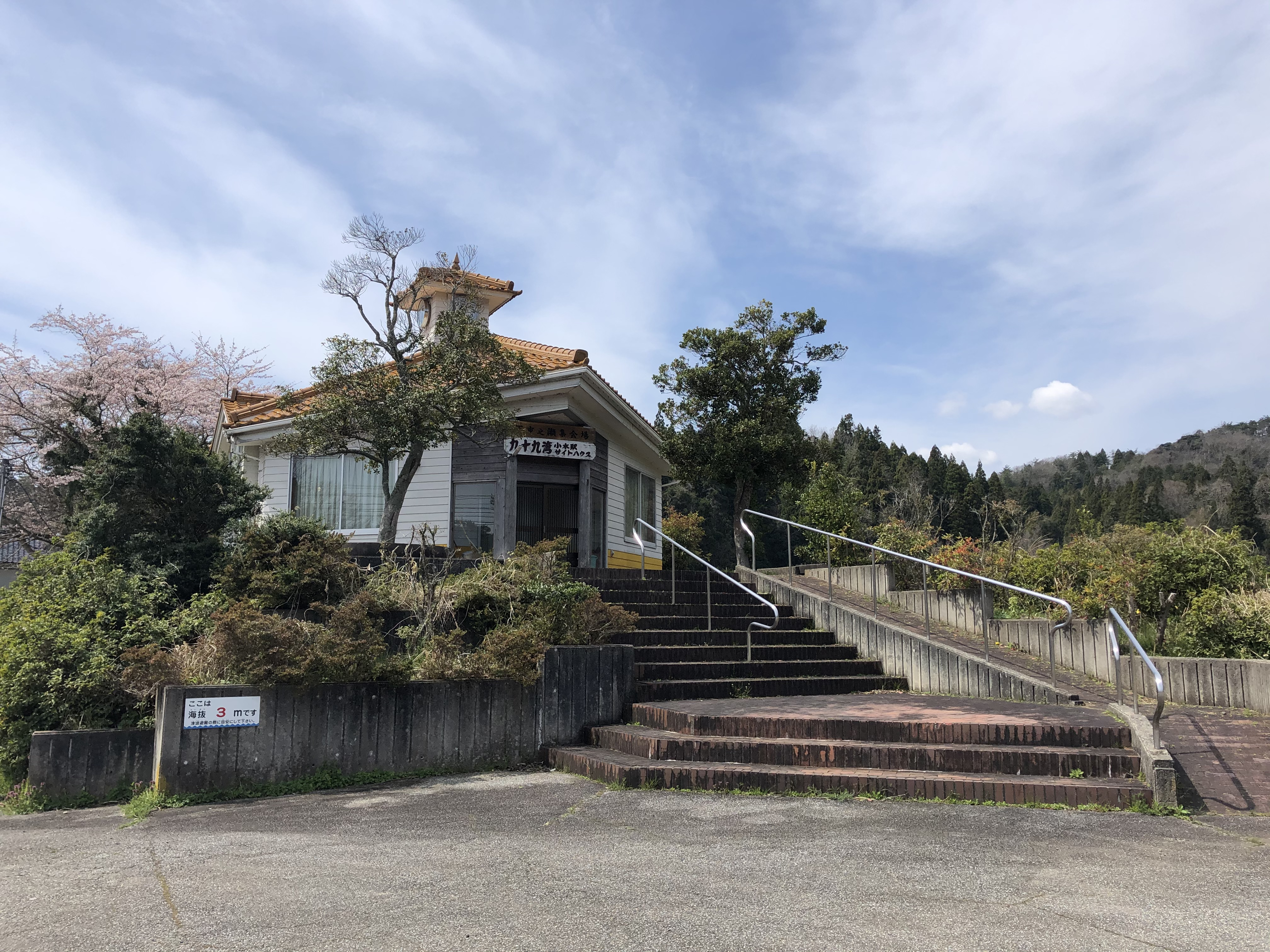
Former station building in 2020

Tsukumowan-Ogi Station (九十九湾小木駅, Tsukumowan-ogi-eki) was a railway station located in Noto, Hōsu District, Ishikawa Prefecture, Japan. This station was abandoned on April 1, 2005.

== Line ==
- Noto Railway
  - Noto Line

== Adjacent stations ==
«	Service	»
Noto Railway Noto Line
Jōmon-Mawaki	-	Shiromaru
