= Shichimi Station =

Railway station in Japan

Coordinates: 37°15′51.8″N 137°5′24.9″E

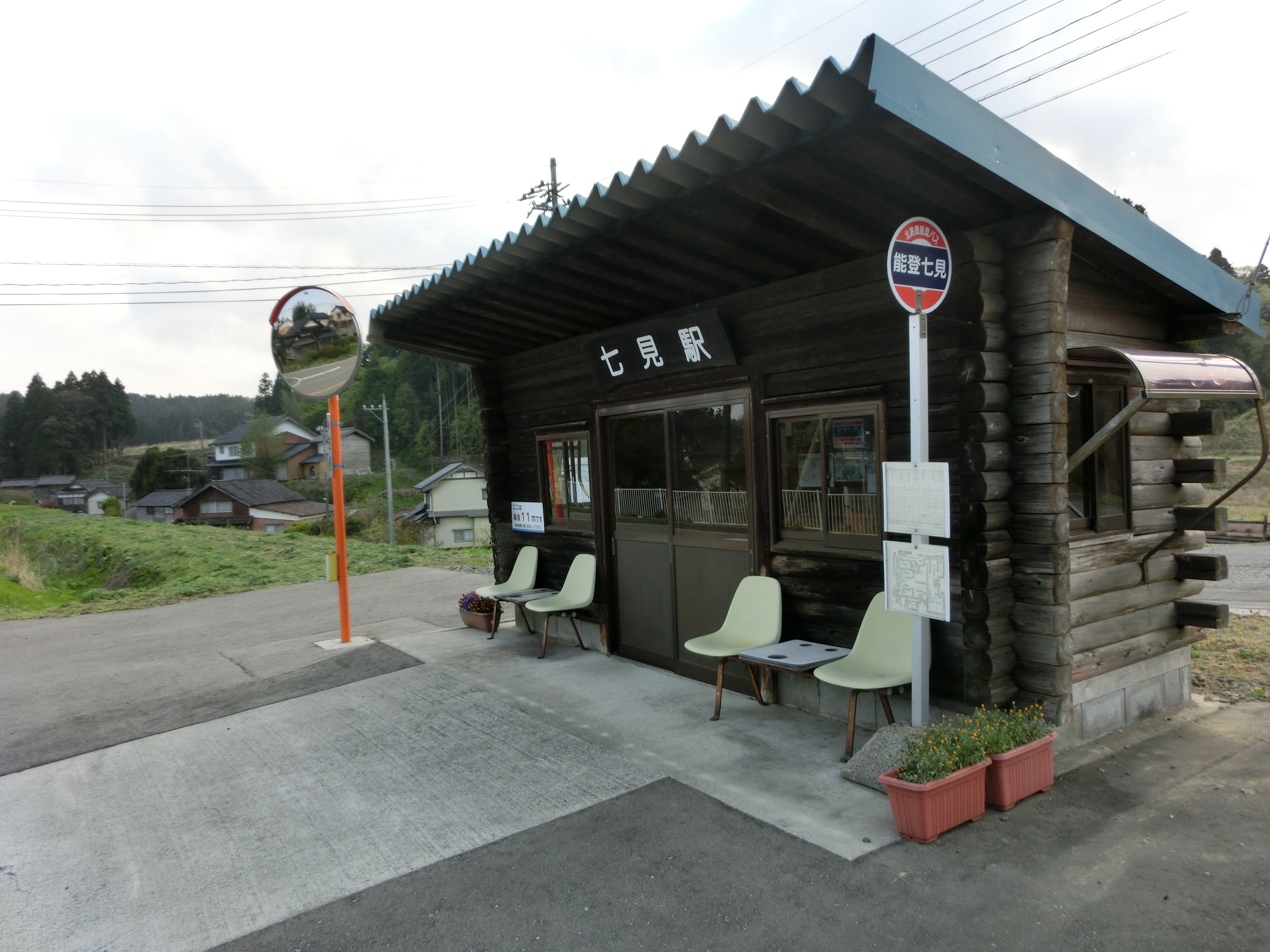

Shichimi Station (七見駅, Shichimi-eki) was a railway station located in Noto, Hōsu District, Ishikawa Prefecture, Japan. This station was abandoned on April 1, 2005.

== Line ==
- Noto Railway
  - Noto Line

== Adjacent stations ==
«	Service	»
Noto Railway Noto Line
Ukawa	-	Yanami
