= Iida Station (Ishikawa) =

Former railway station in Suzu, Ishikawa prefecture, Japan

Coordinates: 37°26′14.5″N 137°15′31.0″E

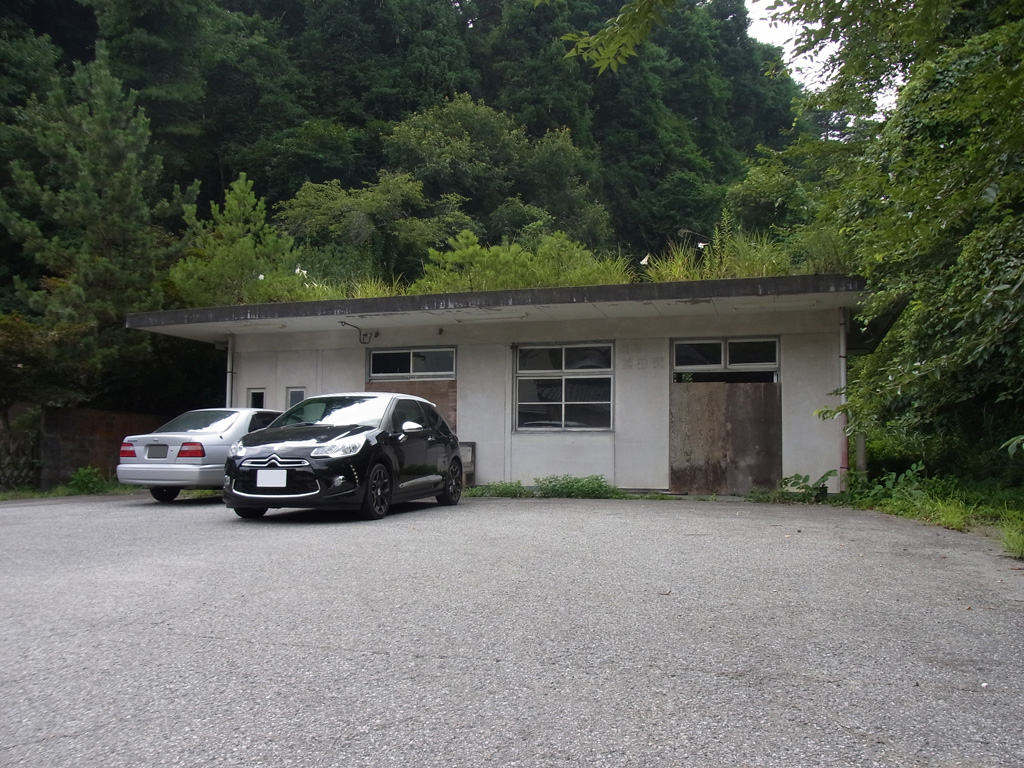
Abandoned station building, August 2013

Iida Station (飯田駅, Iida-eki) was a railway station located in Suzu, Ishikawa Prefecture, Japan. This station was abandoned on April 1, 2005.

== Line ==
- Noto Railway
  - Noto Line

== Adjacent stations ==
«	Service	»
Noto Railway Noto Line
Uedo	-	Suzu
