= Oura Station (Ishikawa) =

Railway station in Noto, Ishikawa prefecture, Japan

Coordinates: 37°18′6.5″N 137°11′33.3″E

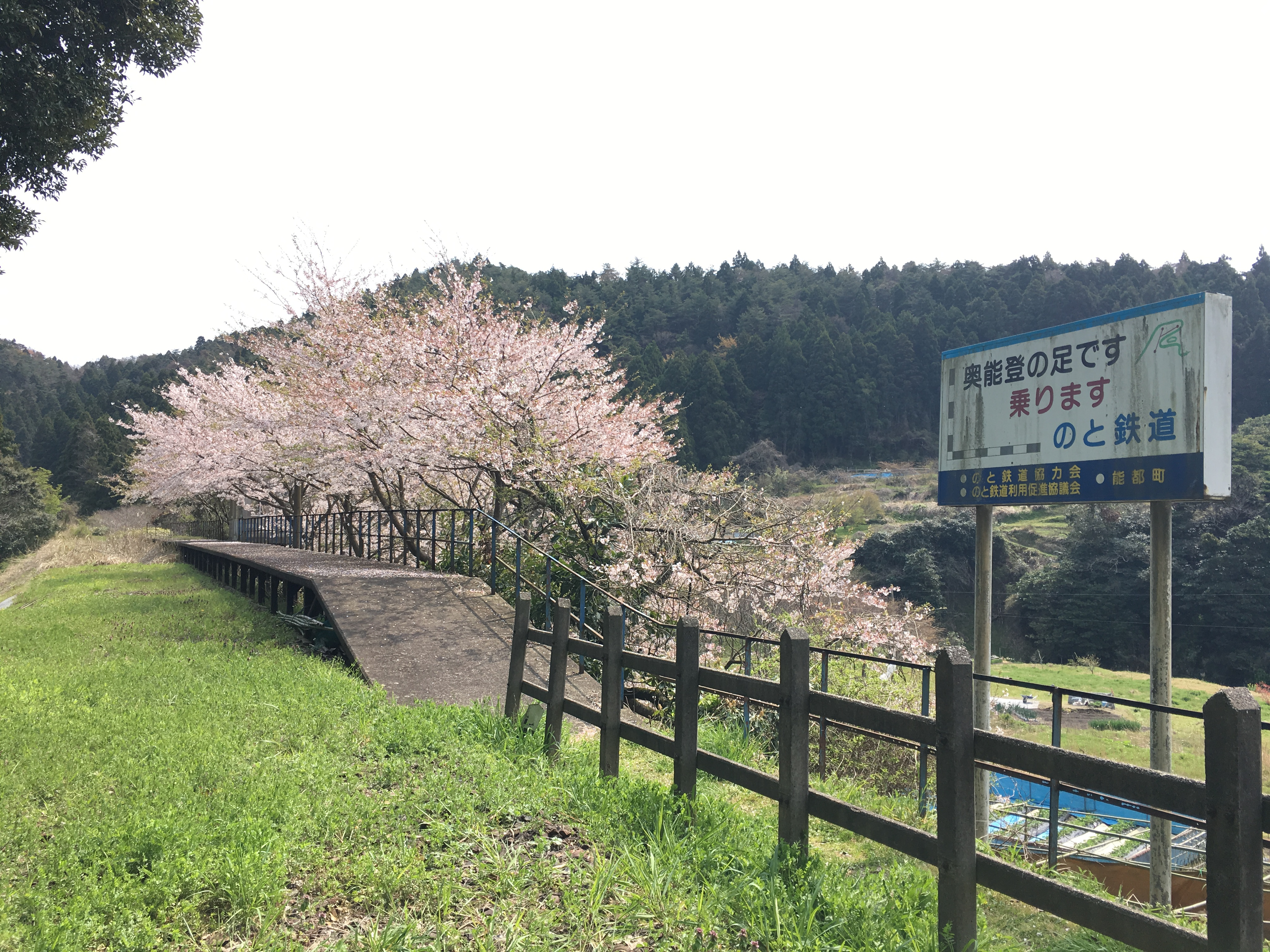

Oura Station (小浦駅, Oura-eki) was a railway station located in Noto, Hōsu District, Ishikawa Prefecture, Japan. This station was abandoned on April 1, 2005.

== Line ==
- Noto Railway
  - Noto Line

== Adjacent stations ==
«	Service	»
Noto Railway Noto Line
Hane	-	Jōmon-Mawaki
