= Koiji Station =

Railway station in Japan

Coordinates: 37°22′19.0″N 137°14′16.8″E

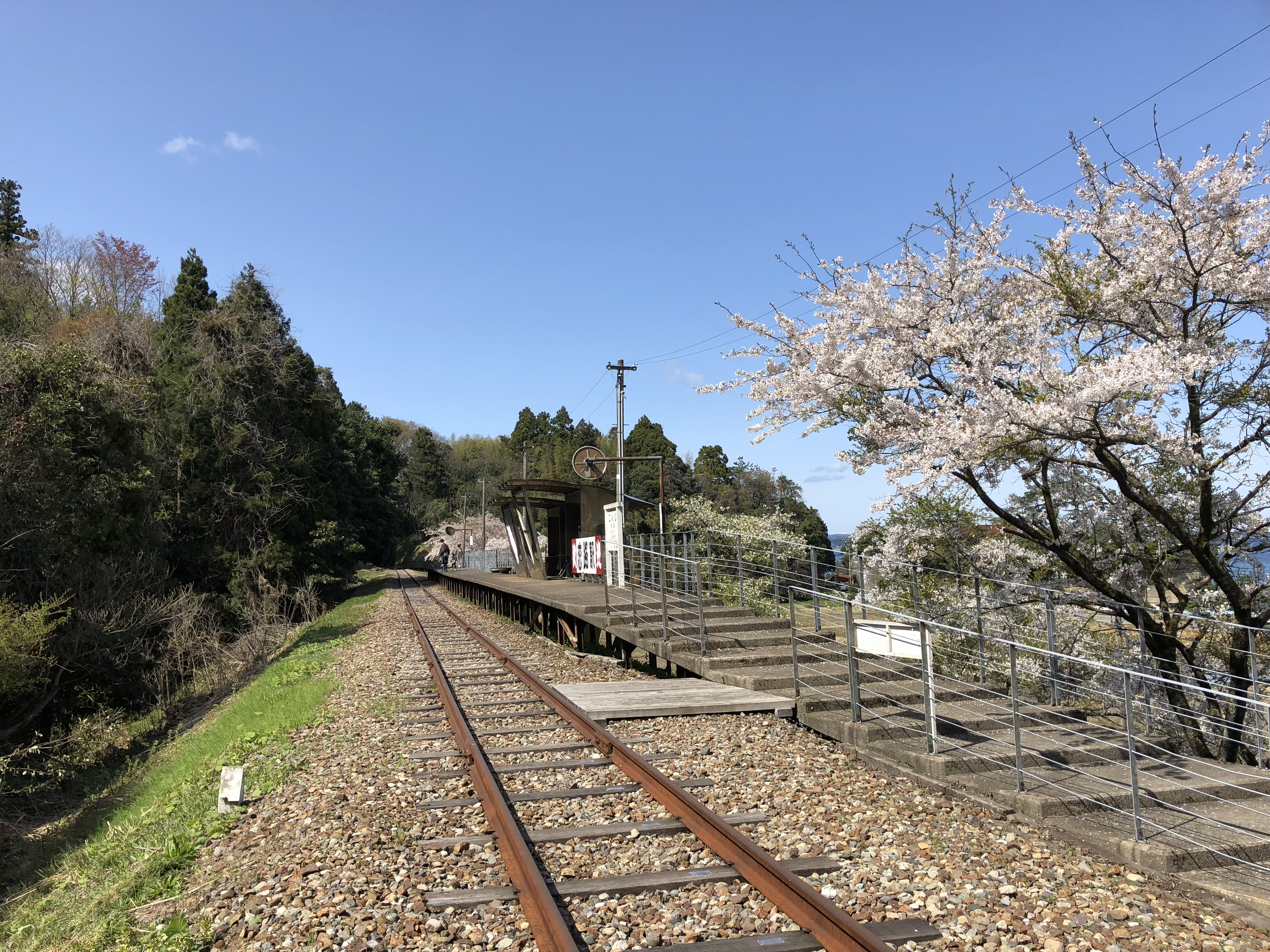
Koiji Station in 2018

Koiji Station (恋路駅, Koiji-eki) was a railway station located in Noto, Hōsu District, Ishikawa Prefecture, Japan. This station was abandoned on April 1, 2005.

== Line ==
- Noto Railway
  - Noto Line

== Adjacent stations ==
«	Service	»
Noto Railway Noto Line
Matsunami	-	Ushima
