= Furukimi Station =

Railway station in Japan

Coordinates: 37°14′6.8″N 137°4′0.1″E

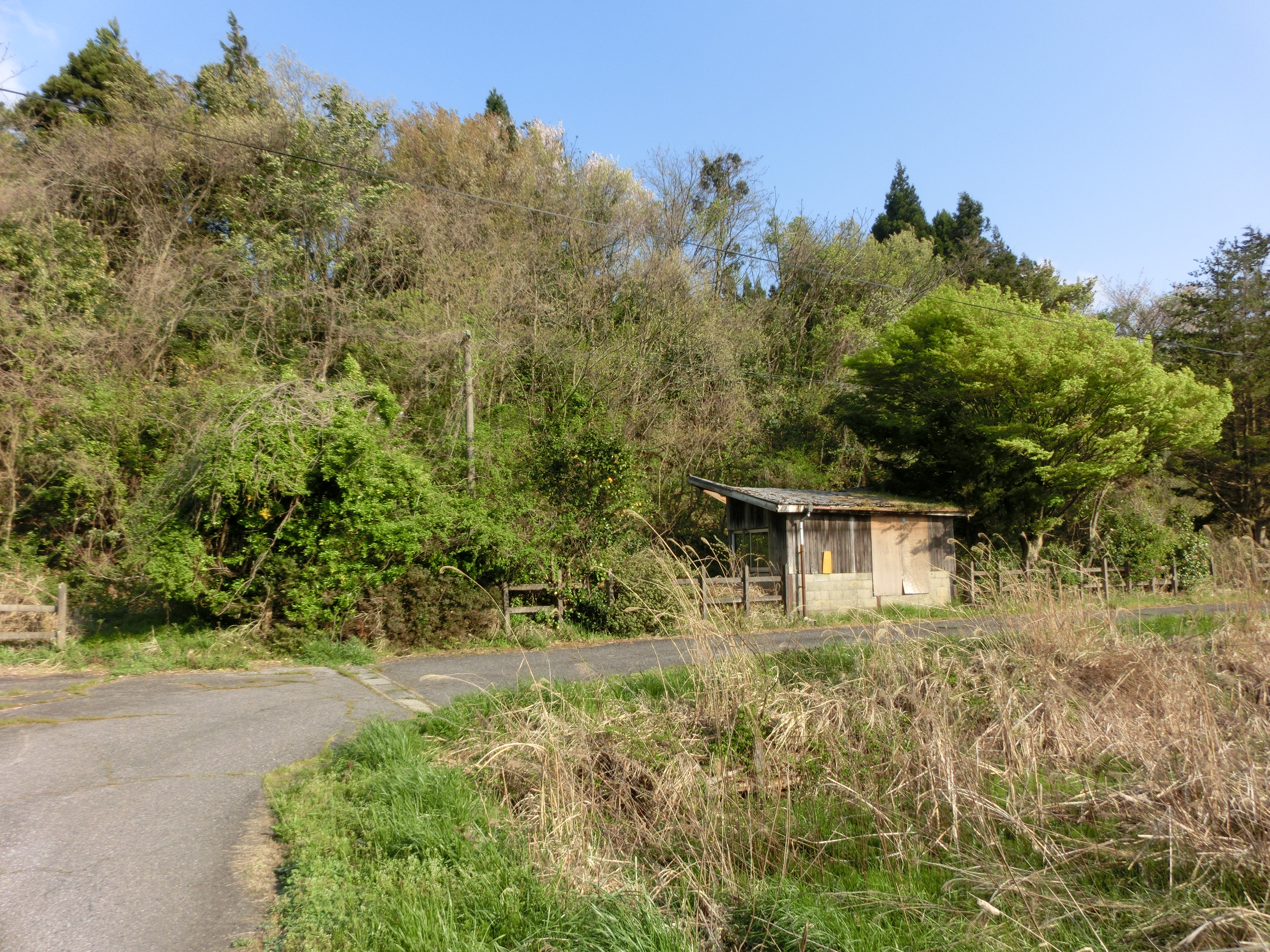
Furukimi Station Site

Furukimi Station (古君駅, Furukimi-eki) was a railway station located in Anamizu, Hōsu District, Ishikawa Prefecture, Japan. This station was abandoned on April 1, 2005.

== Line ==
- Noto Railway
  - Noto Line

== Adjacent stations ==
«	Service	»
Noto Railway Noto Line
Maenami	-	Ukawa
