= Maenami Station =

Railway station in Ishikawa, Japan

Coordinates: 37°13′11.5″N 137°3′39.2″E

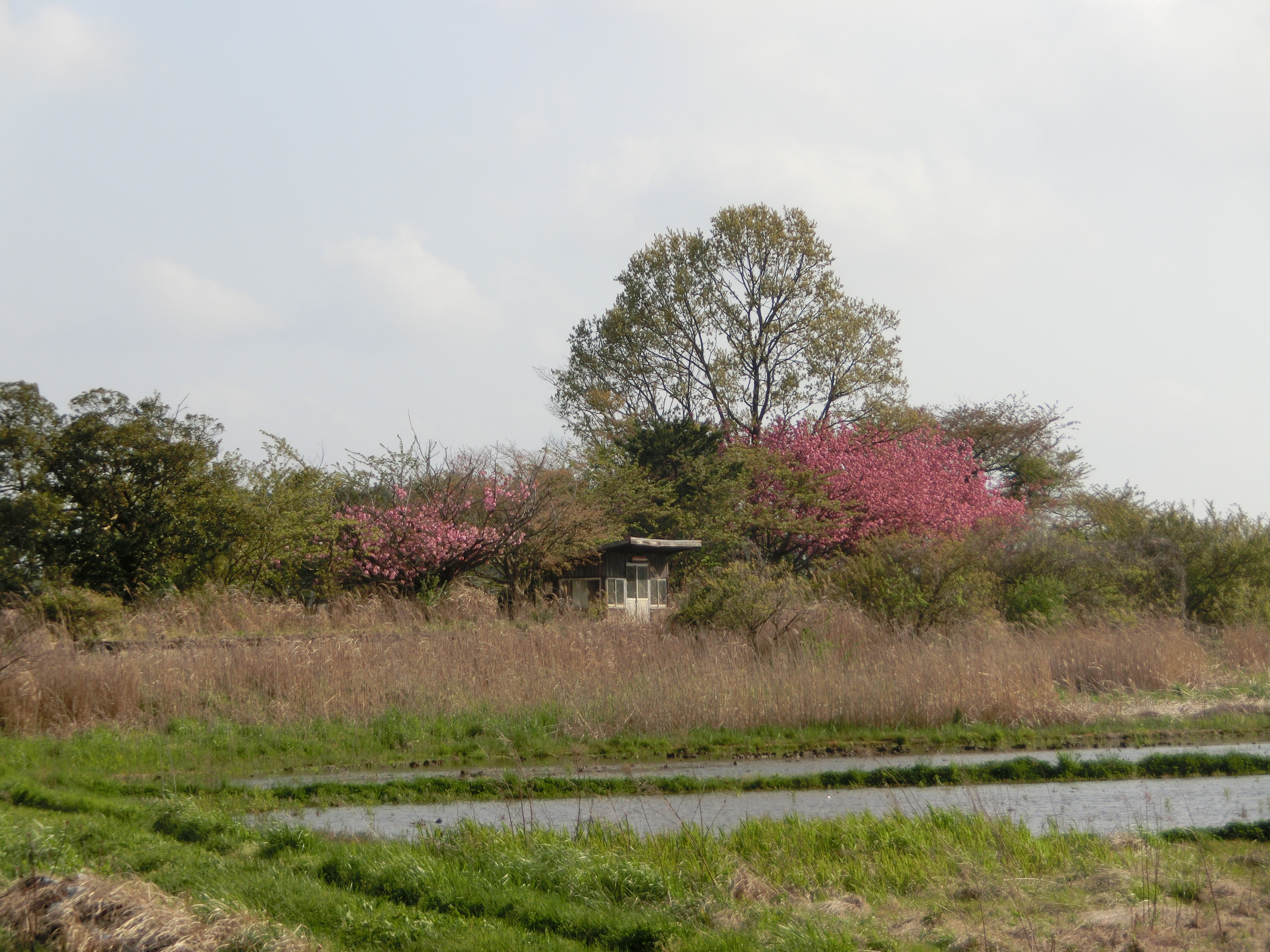
Abandoned Maenami Station

Maenami Station (前波駅, Maenami-eki) was a railway station located in Anamizu, Hōsu District, Ishikawa Prefecture, Japan. This station was abandoned on April 1, 2005

== Line ==
- Noto Railway
  - Noto Line

== Adjacent stations ==
«	Service	»
Noto Railway Noto Line
Okinami	-	Furukimi
