= Suzu Station =

Railway station in Japan

Coordinates: 37°26′29.4″N 137°16′12.3″E

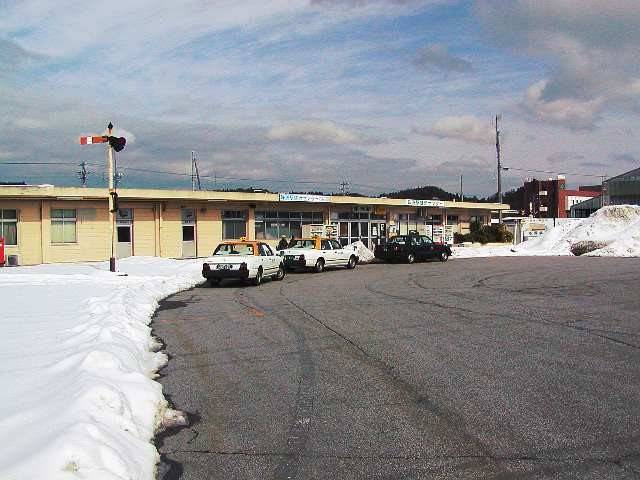
Station building before the closure (2005 or earlier)

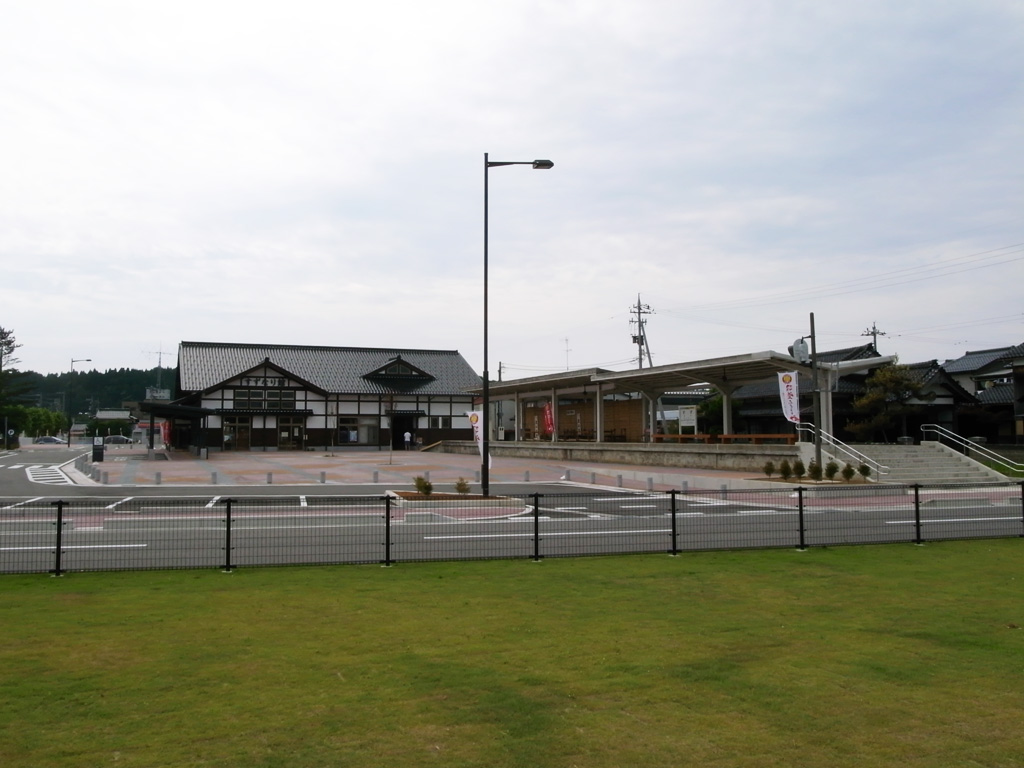
New building on the site of the station (2010)

Suzu Station (珠洲駅, Suzu-eki) was a railway station located in Suzu, Ishikawa Prefecture, Japan. This station was abandoned on April 1, 2005.

== Line ==
- Noto Railway
  - Noto Line

== Adjacent stations ==
«	Service	»
Noto Railway Noto Line
Iida	-	Shōin
