= Uedo Station =

Former railway station in Suzu, Ishikawa prefecture, Japan

Coordinates: 37°25′27.3″N 137°14′53.5″E

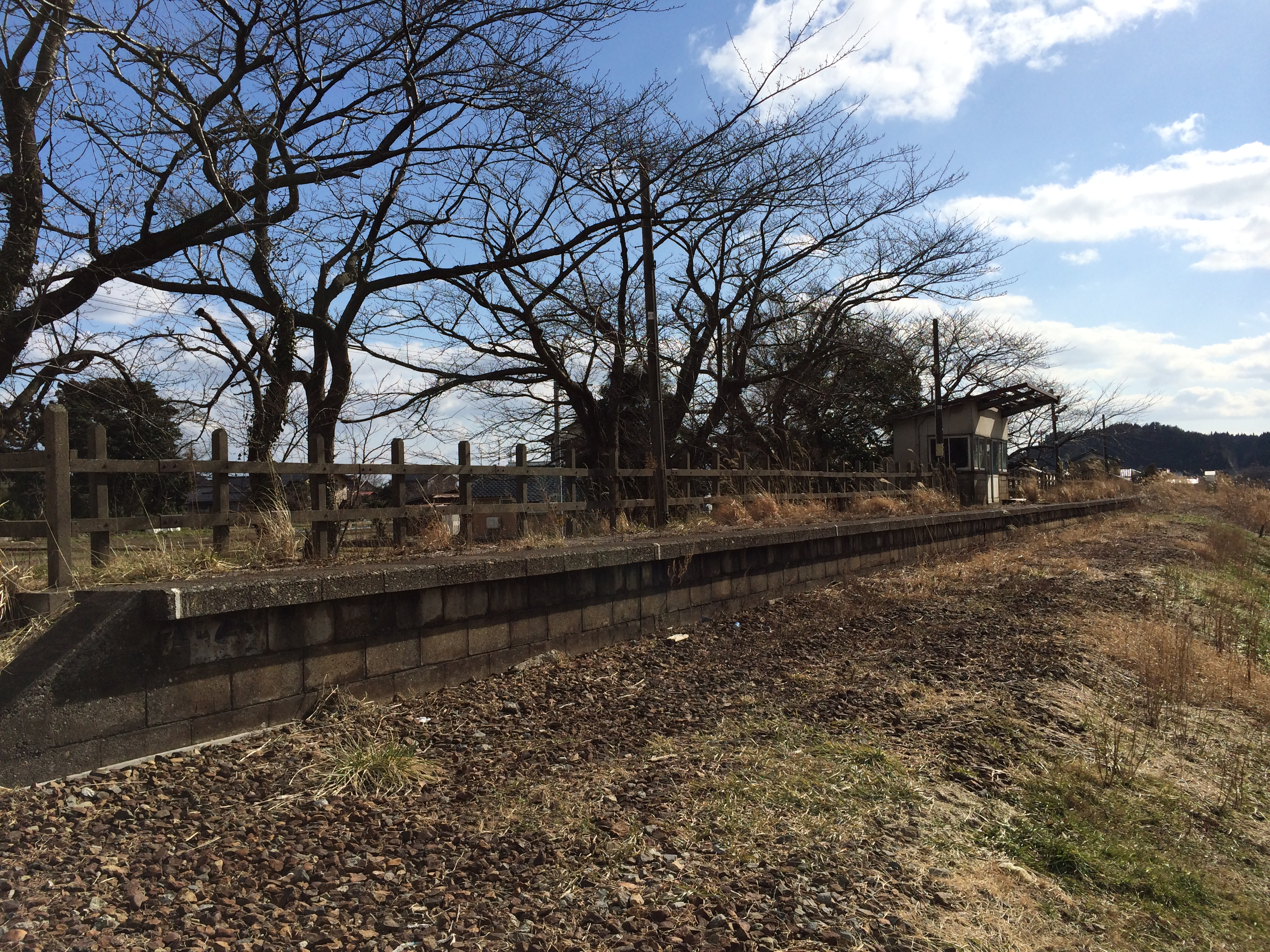
Abandoned platform, February 2014

Uedo Station (上戸駅, Uedo-eki) was a railway station located in Suzu, Ishikawa Prefecture, Japan. The station was abandoned on April 1, 2005.

== Line ==
- Noto Railway
  - Noto Line

== Adjacent stations ==
«	Service	»
Noto Railway Noto Line
Ukai	-	Iida
