= Yanami Station =

Railway station in Japan

Coordinates: 37°16′33.7″N 137°5′47.9″E

Yanami Station 矢波駅
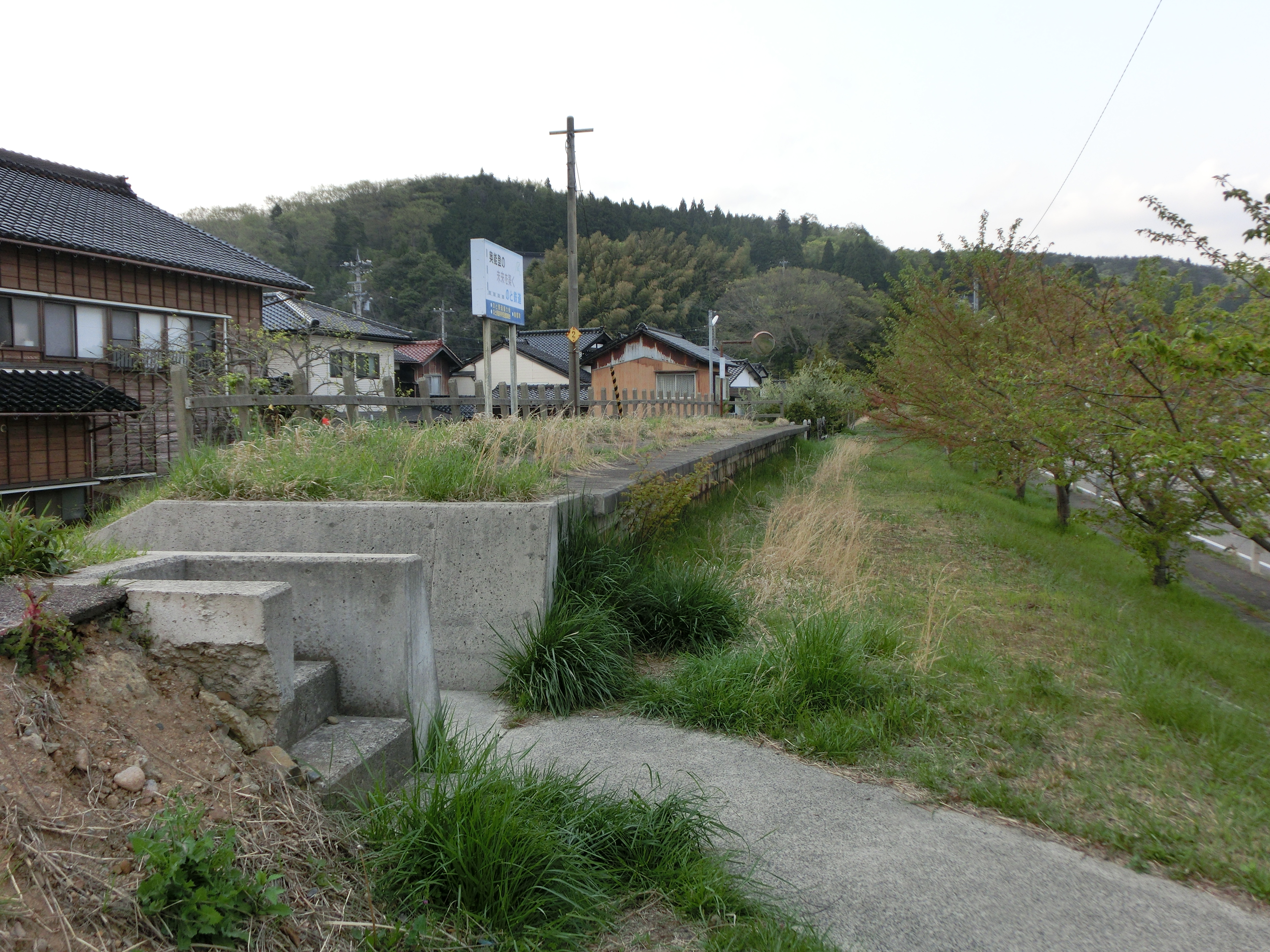
- Yanami Station Site

General information
- Location: Japan
Location

Yanami Station (矢波駅, Yanami-eki) was a railway station located in Noto, Hōsu District, Ishikawa Prefecture, Japan. This station was abandoned on April 1, 2005.

== Adjacent stations ==
«	Service	»
Noto Railway Noto Line
Shichimi	-	Hanami

== Line ==
- Noto Railway
  - Noto Line
