= Fujinami Station (Ishikawa) =

Railway station in Japan

Coordinates: 37°17′48.0″N 137°8′11.4″E

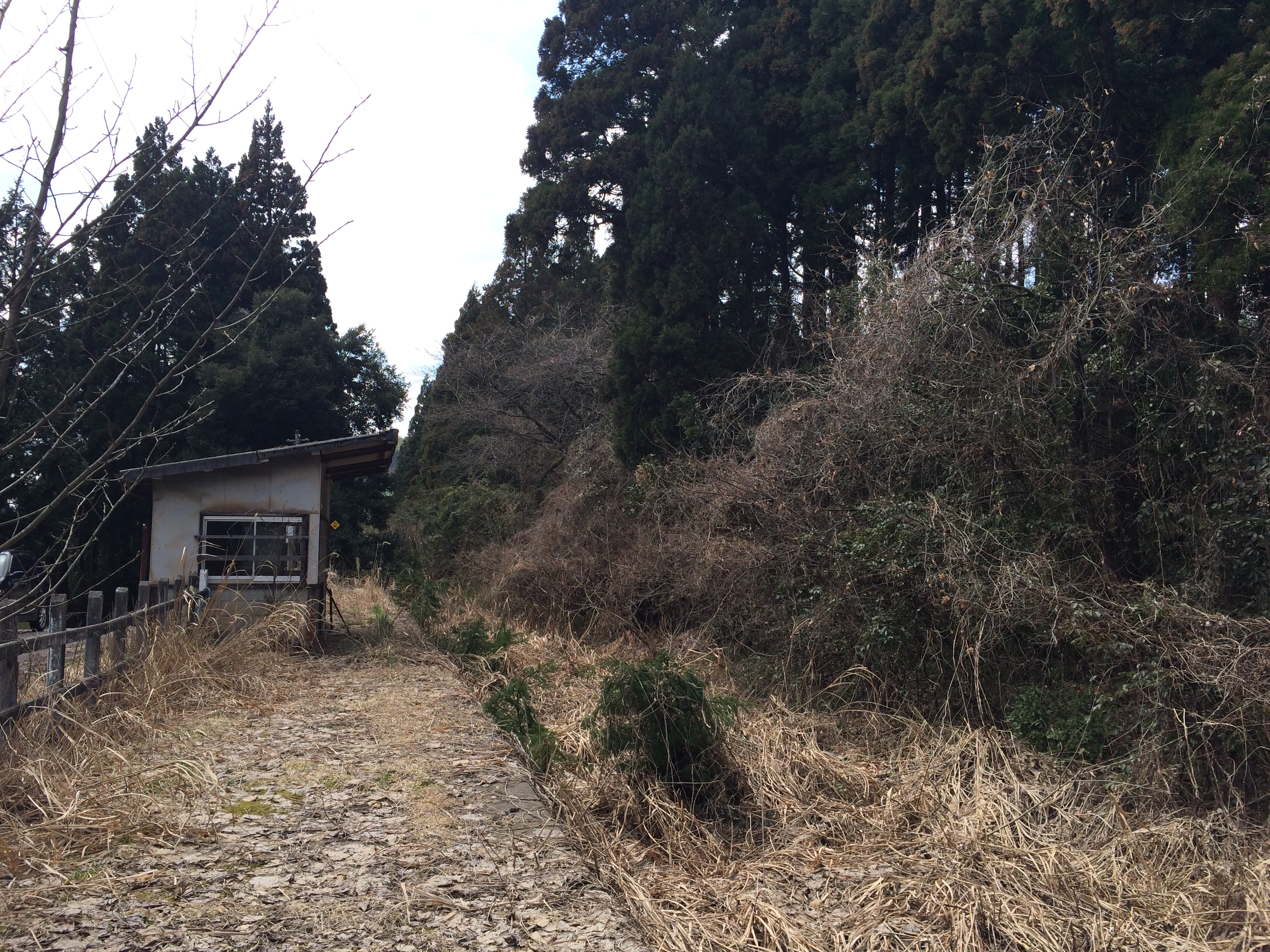
Abandoned platform, March 2015

Fujinami Station (藤波駅, Fujinami-eki) was a railway station located in Noto, Hōsu District, Ishikawa Prefecture, Japan. This station was abandoned on April 1, 2005.

== Lines ==
- Noto Railway
  - Noto Line

== Adjacent stations ==
| « | Service | » |
Noto Railway Noto Line
| Hanami | - | Ushitsu |
