= Hane Station (Ishikawa) =

Railway station in Japan

Coordinates: 37°18′7.0″N 137°10′27.7″E

Hane Station (羽根駅, Hane-eki) was a railway station located in Noto, Hōsu District, Ishikawa Prefecture, Japan. This station was abandoned on April 1, 2005.

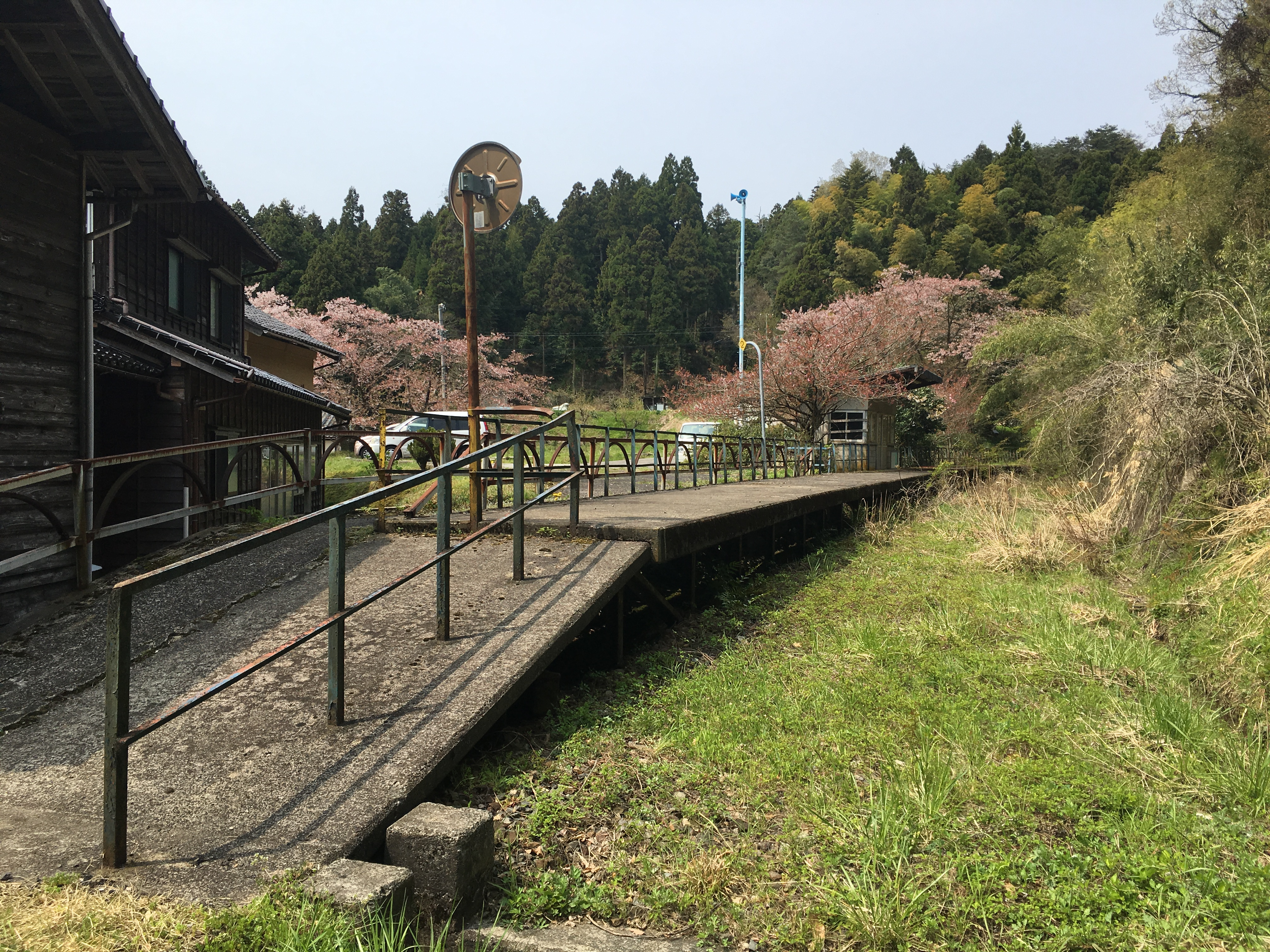

== Line ==
- Noto Railway
  - Noto Line

== Adjacent stations ==
«	Service	»
Noto Railway Noto Line
Ushitsu	-	Oura
