= Takojima Station =

Closed railway station in Ishikawa Prefecture, Japan

Coordinates: 37°26′33.0″N 137°18′29.9″E

Takojima Station 蛸島駅
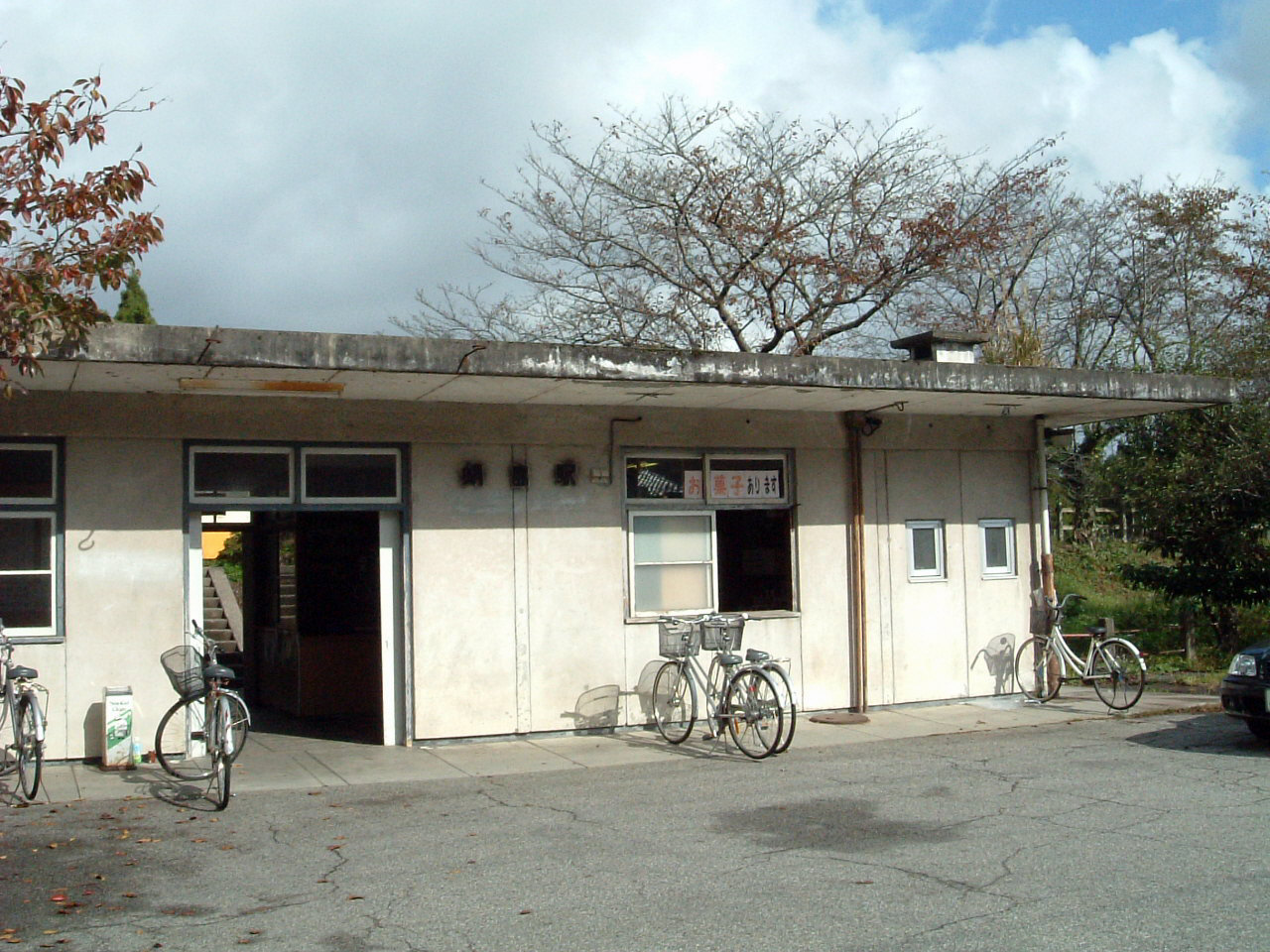
- Station building, November 2004

General information
- Location: Suzu, Ishikawa; Japan
- Operator: Noto Railway
- Line: Noto Line

History
- Opened: 1964
- Closed: 2005
Location

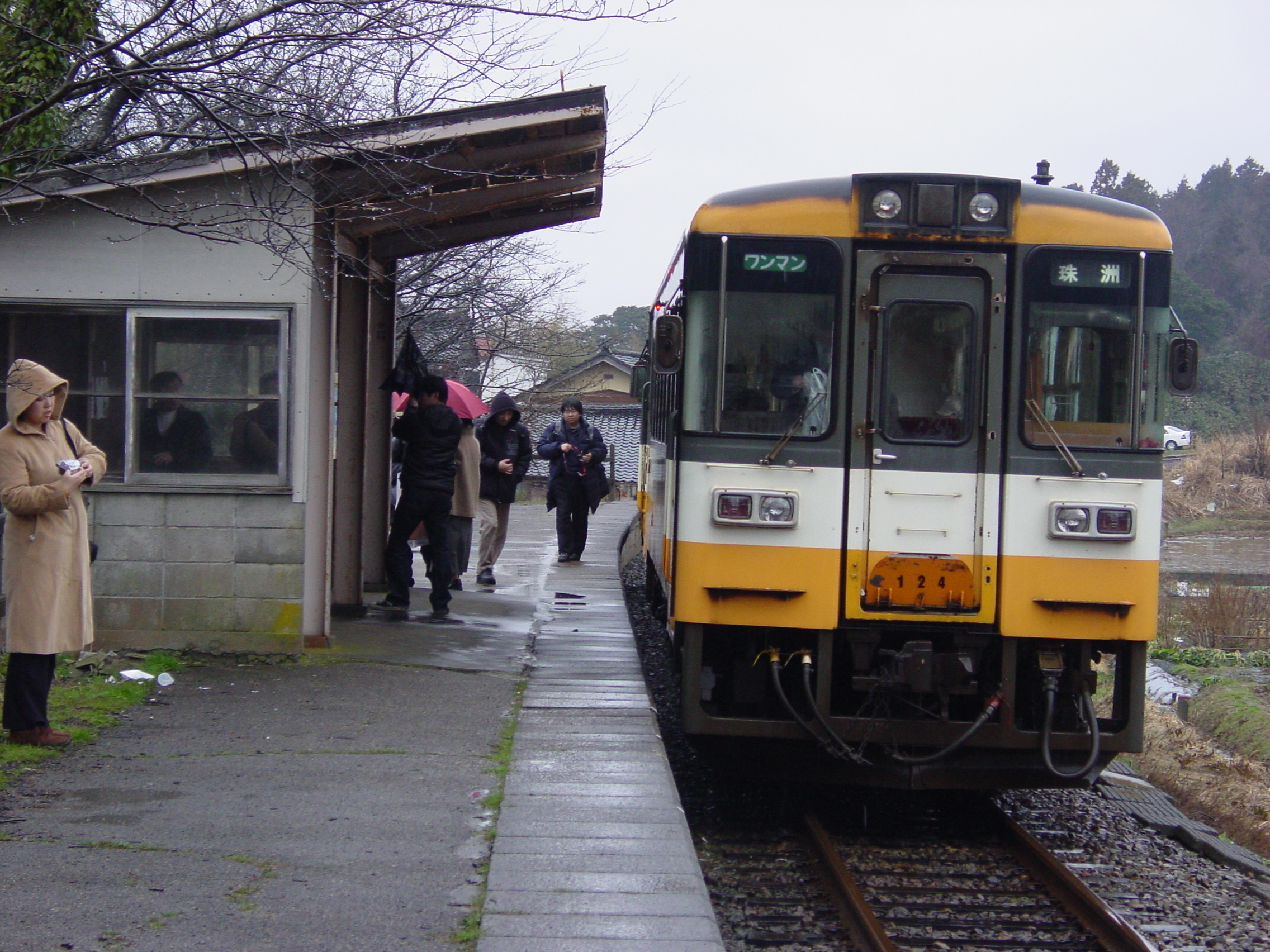
Platform and train, February 2005

Takojima Station (蛸島駅, Takojima-eki) was a railway station located in Suzu, Ishikawa Prefecture, Japan.

== Line ==
- Noto Railway
  - Noto Line

== History ==
This station was opened on September 21, 1964, by Japanese National Railways as the terminus of the Noto Line. After the privatization of JNR on April 1, 1987, the station as well as the line was operated by West Japan Railway Company, which transferred the line and the station to Noto Railway on March 25, 1988.

Noto Railway abandoned the Noto Line and closed the station on April 1, 2005.

== Layout ==
The station had only one platform serving one track. (See picture)

== Adjacent stations ==
«	Service	»
Noto Railway Noto Line
Shōin	-	Terminus
