= Kasamatsu =

Kasamatsu may refer to:

- Kasamatsu, Gifu (笠松), a town in Hashima District, Gifu Prefecture, Japan
  - Kasamatsu Station (Gifu) (笠松駅), a railway station located in Kasamatsu, Hashima District, Gifu Prefecture, Japan
  - Nishi-Kasamatsu Station in Gifu
- Kasamatsu Stadium a multi-purpose stadium in Naka, Japan, built in 1998
- Kasamatsu (surname), a Japanese surname
