= Suka Station =

Railway station in Hashima, Gifu Prefecture, Japan

Suka Station 須賀駅

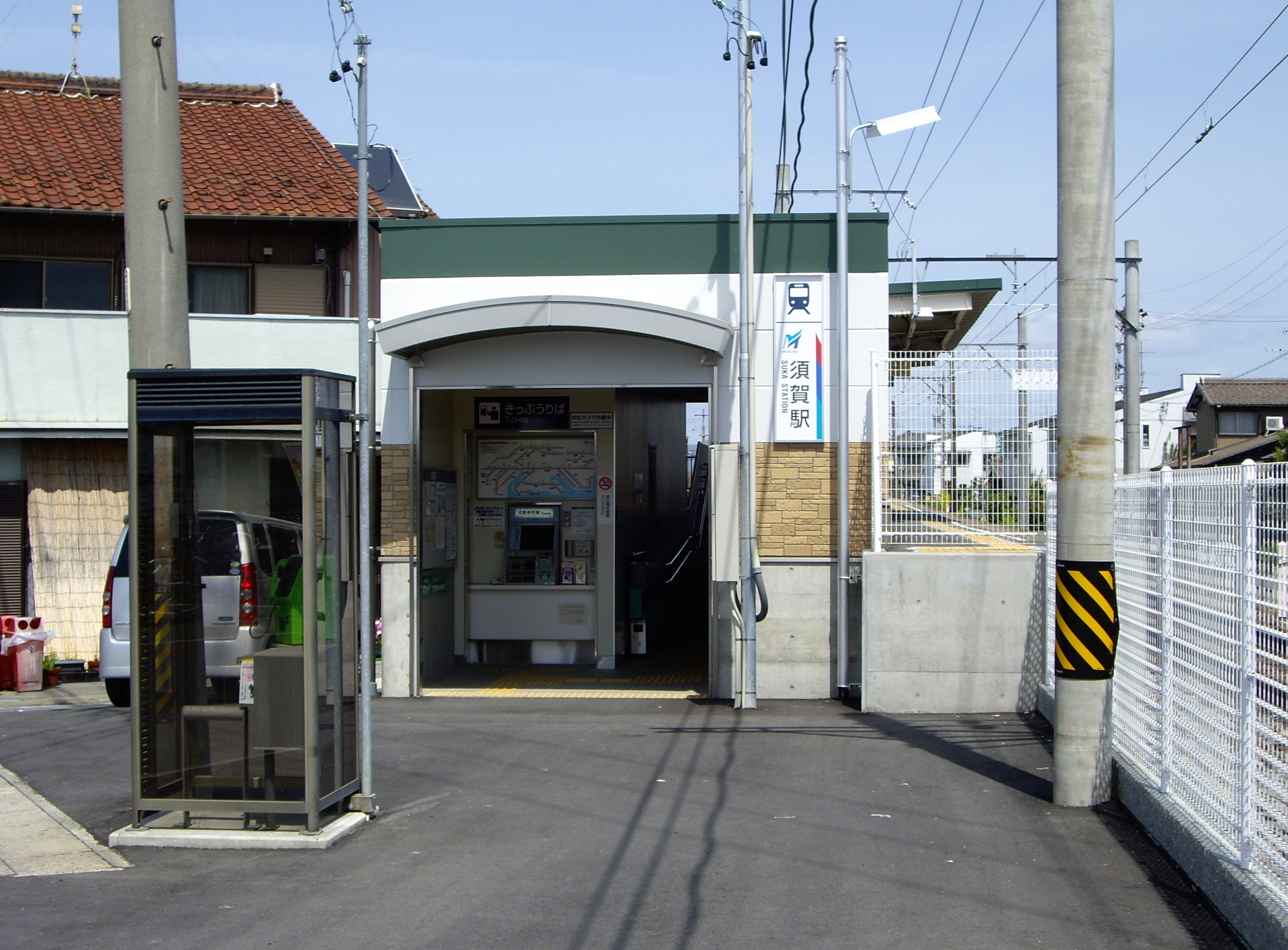
- Suka Station in April 2008

General information
- Location: Masaki-cho Suga Komachi, Hashima-shi, Gifu-ken 501-6217; Japan
- Coordinates: 35.3401°N 136.7267°E
- Operator: Meitetsu
- Line: ■ Meitetsu Takehana Line
- Distance: 6.1 km from Kasamatsu
- Platforms: 1 side platform

Other information
- Status: Unstaffed
- Station code: TH04
- Website: Official website (in Japanese)

History
- Opened: June 25, 1921; 105 years ago

Passengers
- FY2016: 992 daily

Services
Preceding station	Meitetsu	Following station
Minami-Juku towards Kasamatsu	Takehana Line	Fuwa Ishiki towards Egira
Location
- Location within Gifu Prefecture Location within Japan

Suka Station (須賀駅, Suka-eki) is a railway station located in the city of Hashima, Gifu Prefecture, Japan, operated by the private railway operator Meitetsu.

== Lines ==
Suka Station is a station on the Takehana Line, and is located 6.1 kilometers from the terminus of the line at Kasamatsu.

== Station layout ==
Suka Station has one ground-level side platform serving a single bi-directional track. The station is unattended.

■ Meitetsu Takehana Line	For Shin-Hashima
■ Meitetsu Takehana Line	For Meitetsu Gifu

== History ==
Suka Station opened on June 25, 1921.

== Surrounding area ==
- Hashiba Junior High School

== See also ==
- List of railway stations in Japan
