= Fuwa Ishiki Station =

Railway station in Hashima, Gifu Prefecture, Japan

Fuwa Ishiki Station 不破一色駅

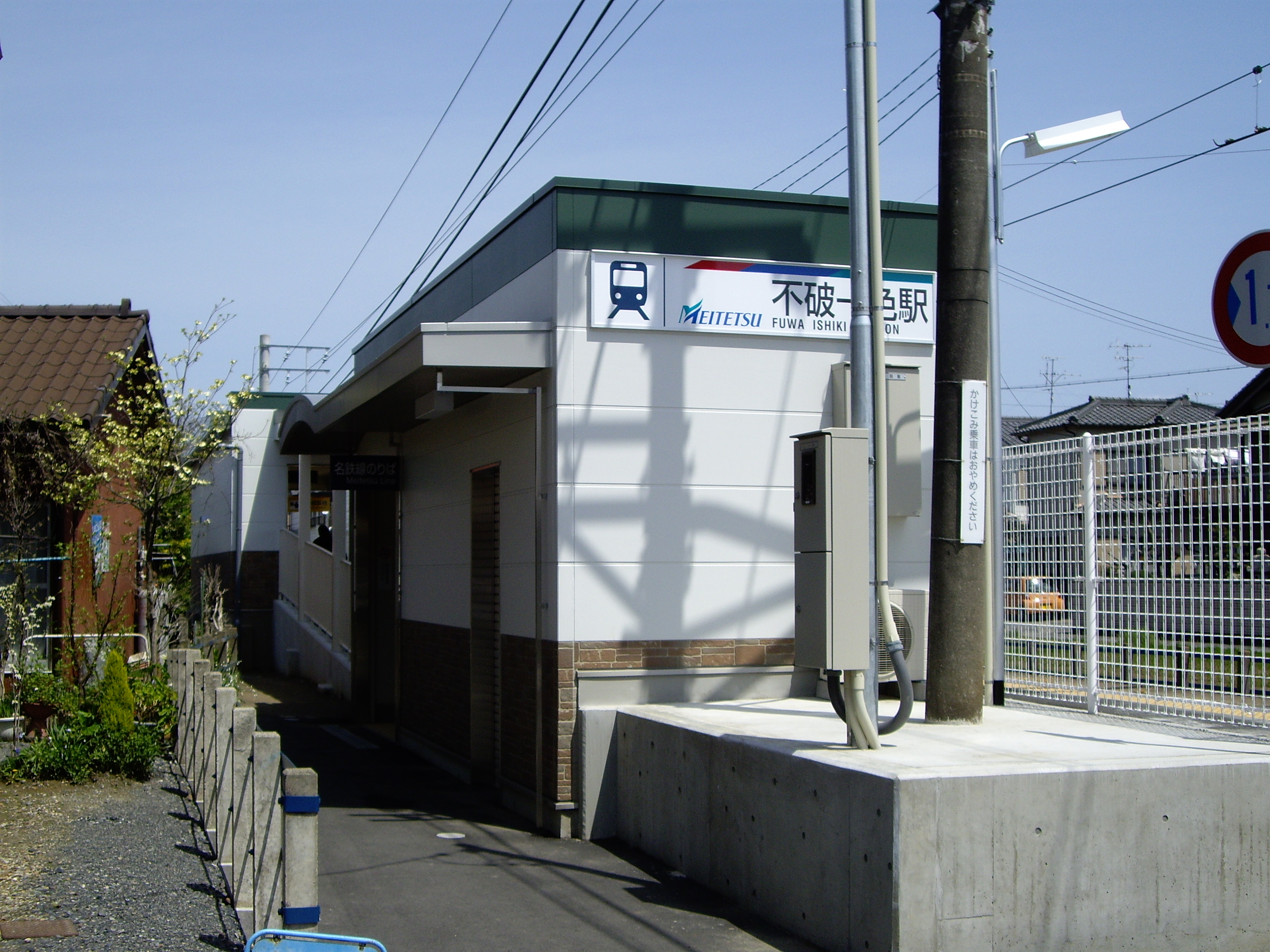
- Fuwa-Ishiki Station in April 2008

General information
- Location: Masakicho Suka, Hashima, Gifu Prefecture 501-6216; Japan
- Coordinates: 35.3329°N 136.7220°E
- Operator: Meitetsu
- Line: ■ Meitetsu Takehana Line
- Distance: 7.0 km from Kasamatsu
- Platforms: 1 side platform

Other information
- Status: Unstaffed
- Station code: TH05
- Website: Official website (in Japanese)

History
- Opened: June 25, 1921; 105 years ago

Passengers
- FY2016: 1,153 daily

Services
| Preceding station | Meitetsu | Following station |
|---|---|---|
| Suka towards Kasamatsu | Takehana Line | Takehana towards Egira |
Location
- Location within Gifu Prefecture Location within Japan

Fuwa Ishiki Station (不破一色駅, Fuwa-Ishiki-eki) is a railway station located in the city of Hashima, Gifu Prefecture, Japan, operated by the private railway operator Meitetsu.

== Lines ==
Fuwa Ishiki Station is a station on the Takehana Line, and is located 7.0 kilometers from the terminus of the line at Kasamatsu.

== Station layout ==
Fuwa Ishiki Station has one ground-level side platform serving a single bi-directional track. The station is unattended.

| ■ Meitetsu Takehana Line | For Shin-Hashima |
| ■ Meitetsu Takehana Line | For Meitetsu Gifu |

== History ==
Fuwa Ishiki Station opened on June 25, 1921.

== Surrounding area ==
- Masaki Elementary School
- Fuwaishiki Community Centre
- Masakinakahata Park

== See also ==
- List of railway stations in Japan
