= Meitetsu Takehana Line =

Railway line in Gifu Prefecture, Japan

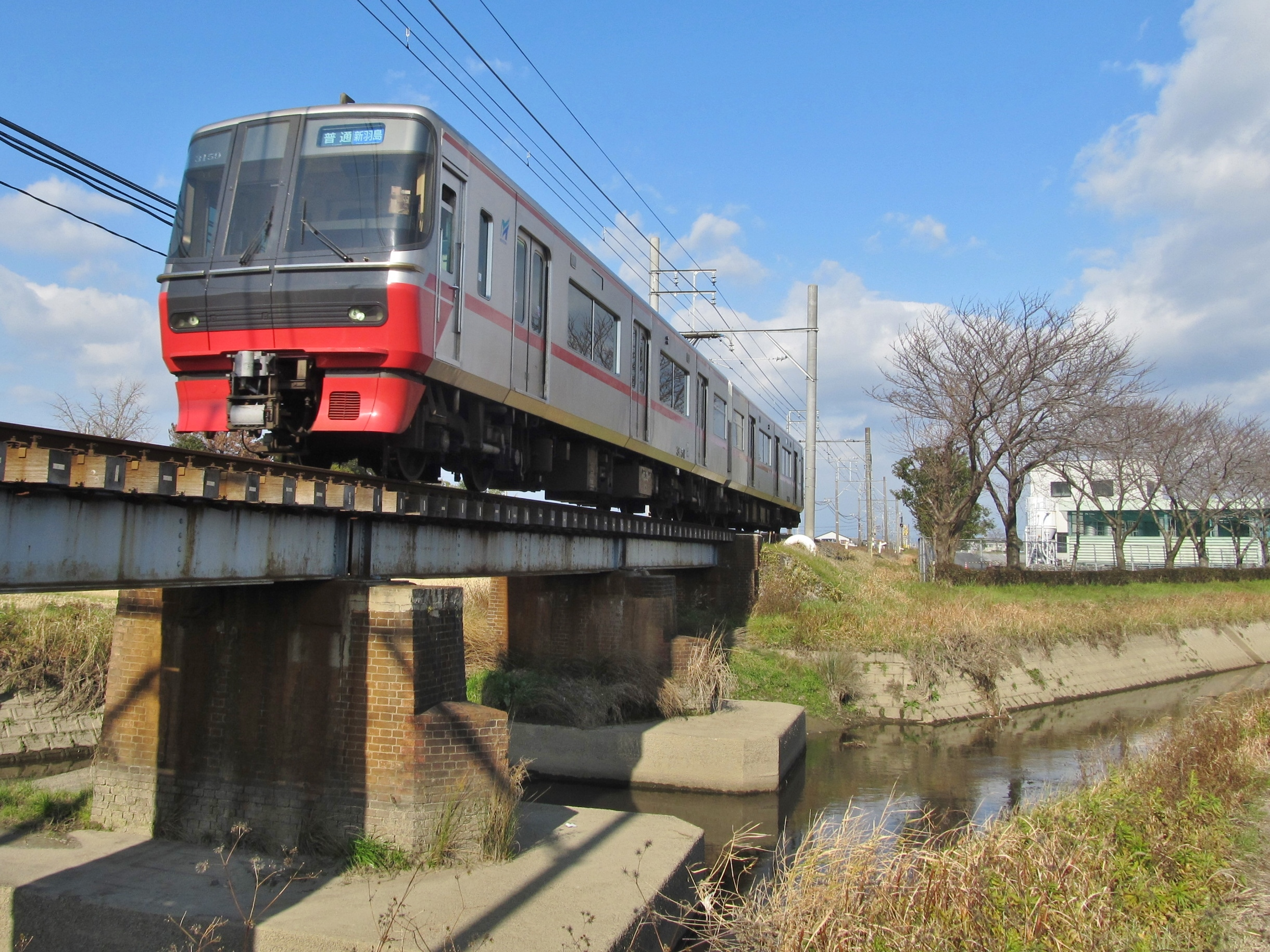
- A 3150 series train between Minami-Juku and Suka in December 2015

Overview
- Native name: 竹鼻線
- Owner: Meitetsu
- Locale: Gifu Prefecture
- Termini: Kasamatsu; Egira
- Stations: 9

Service
- Type: Commuter rail
- System: Meitetsu
- Operator: Meitetsu

History
- Opened: June 25, 1921; 105 years ago

Technical
- Line length: 10.3 km (6.40 mi)
- Number of tracks: Entire line single-track
- Track gauge: 1,067 mm (3 ft 6 in)
- Electrification: 1,500 V DC, overhead catenary
- Operating speed: 90 km/h (56 mph)
- Signalling: Automatic block signalling
- Train protection system: M-ATS

The Meitetsu Takehana Line (名鉄竹鼻線, Meitetsu Takehana-sen) is a railway line in Gifu Prefecture, Japan, operated by the private railway company Meitetsu (Nagoya Railroad). The line runs 10.3 km (6.4 mi) from Kasamatsu Station in Kasamatsu to Egira Station in Hashima. At Egira, almost all trains continue over the Hashima Line to Shin-Hashima Station, adjacent to Gifu-Hashima Station on the Tōkaidō Shinkansen.

The Takehana and Hashima lines operate as a single service corridor entirely within Gifu Prefecture. All stations accept manaca and the other cards participating in Japan's Nationwide Mutual Usage Service.

== Route data ==
- Route length: 10.3 km (6.4 mi) between Kasamatsu and Egira; the former Egira–Ōsu section was 6.7 km (4.2 mi) long.
- Gauge: 1,067 mm (3 ft 6 in)
- Stations: 9, including both termini
- Track: single throughout; passing loops are provided at Nishi-Kasamatsu, Minami-Juku and Hashima-shiyakusho-mae.
- Electrification: 1,500 V DC by overhead line
- Signalling: automatic block signalling with M-ATS train protection
- Maximum speed: 90 km/h (56 mph)
- Fare category: the Takehana Line is grouped with Meitetsu's third distance category for fare calculations.

== Services ==
The line is operated together with the Hashima Line. All scheduled trains are local services and call at every station. Most run between Kasamatsu and Shin-Hashima, although some begin or terminate at Hashima-shiyakusho-mae. The March 2026 timetable provides three to four trains per hour in the morning, two per hour in the middle of the day, and generally three per hour during the late afternoon and evening.

With one exception, trains turn back at Kasamatsu rather than continuing onto the Meitetsu Nagoya Main Line. The final train of the day leaves Meitetsu Gifu at 23:39 and runs through to Hashima-shiyakusho-mae; no scheduled train runs in the reverse direction through to Meitetsu Gifu. The physical junction at Kasamatsu permits through trains only in the Meitetsu Gifu direction, not toward Meitetsu Nagoya.

All services became driver-only on 14 March 2026. Kasamatsu is the only station on the Takehana–Hashima corridor where ticket-office staff are regularly present.

Until 30 September 2001, some trains operated as expresses on the Takehana Line, calling at Kasamatsu, Takehana and Hashima-shiyakusho-mae. All trains became all-stations services when the Egira–Ōsu section closed on 1 October 2001.

== History ==
=== Takehana Railway ===
The line originated with the Takehana Railway (竹鼻鉄道, Takehana Tetsudō). A railway licence for a route between Kasamatsu and Komazuka was granted to its promoters on 24 June 1919, and the company was incorporated on 14 November that year.

On 25 June 1921, the company opened an electrified line from a temporary Shin-Kasamatsu station, near the present Nishi-Kasamatsu, to the original Takehana station. The line initially used 600 V DC electrification. In September 1921, the Takehana Railway began sharing the relocated Kasamatsu station with the Mino Electric Railway; the temporary Shin-Kasamatsu terminus was subsequently removed.

The government granted the company a further licence from Komazuka to Yagami in March 1924. The original Takehana station was renamed Sakaemachi in February 1929, and on 1 April the railway opened an extension from Sakaemachi to Ōsu, completing a route of 17.0 km (10.6 mi) from Kasamatsu.

Meitetsu absorbed the Takehana Railway on 1 March 1943, after which the Kasamatsu–Ōsu route became the Takehana Line.

=== Chronology ===
- 1919
  - 24 June: A railway licence was granted for the proposed Kasamatsu–Komazuka route.
  - 14 November: Takehana Railway was incorporated.
- 1921
  - 25 June: Shin-Kasamatsu–Takehana opened, electrified at 600 V DC.
  - 21 September: the relocated Kasamatsu station opened for joint use by Mino Electric Railway and Takehana Railway.
- 1924 – 25 March: a licence was granted for the Komazuka–Yagami extension.
- 1929
  - 19 February: the original Takehana station was renamed Sakaemachi.
  - 1 April: Sakaemachi–Ōsu opened, completing the line to Ōsu.
- 1930
  - 20 August: Nagoya Railroad merged with Mino Electric Railway, which operated the connecting Kasamatsu Line.
  - 5 September: Nagoya Railroad changed its name to Meigi Railway.
- 1935 – 1 August: Meigi Railway adopted the name Nagoya Railroad (Meitetsu).
- 1936 – May: Shin-Kasamatsu was renamed Kasamatsu, while the former joint-use Kasamatsu station became Nishi-Kasamatsu.
- 1942 – 1 June: Kasamatsuguchi station, between Kasamatsu and Nishi-Kasamatsu, closed.
- 1943 – 1 March: Meitetsu absorbed the Takehana Railway and named the Kasamatsu–Ōsu route the Takehana Line.
- 1944 – Higashi-Suka, Higashi-Yanaizu, Kadoma, Magari, Hongakuji-mae, Egira, Nagama, Oki, Mino-Ishida, Shōsenji-mae and Kuwabara stations were suspended.
- c. 1947 – Nagama station reopened.
- 1951 – 1 January: Sakaemachi was renamed Takehana; the station then named Takehana became Nishi-Takehana.
- 1953 – 1 February: Nishi-Yanaizu was renamed Yanaizu.
- 1954 – Ōsu station was relocated.
- 1959 – 1 April: Nishi-Takehana was renamed Hashima.
- 1962 – 10 June: the overhead voltage was raised from 600 V to 1,500 V DC.
- 1969 – 5 April: nine stations that had remained suspended since 1944 were formally closed.
- 1982 – 11 December: the Hashima Line opened. Hashima station was renamed Hashima-shiyakusho-mae, Egira reopened as the junction with the new line, and express operation began on the Takehana Line.
- 2001 – 1 October: the 6.7 km (4.2 mi) Egira–Ōsu section closed and was replaced by a bus service; express operation on the remaining line ended.
- 2007 – 14 December: the Tranpass magnetic fare-card system was introduced at every station except Yanaizu, which was due to be relocated.
- 2011 – 11 February: Meitetsu launched the manaca IC-card system.
- 2026 – 14 March: driver-only operation began on all Takehana and Hashima Line services.

=== 2001 partial closure ===
The Egira–Ōsu section closed on 1 October 2001. The six intermediate and terminal stations affected were Makino, Nagama, Nakaku, Ichinoeda, Yagami and Ōsu. Hashima City introduced a replacement bus over the former corridor.

At the time of closure, the 6.7 km (4.2 mi) section was entirely single-track and had no passing loop. It therefore functioned as a single block section in which only one train could operate at a time. Services normally shuttled between Hashima-shiyakusho-mae and Ōsu at two trains per hour, half the frequency then provided between Kasamatsu and Hashima-shiyakusho-mae.

After the closure, Egira ceased to be a junction. Current services call there before continuing over the Hashima Line, producing the present Kasamatsu–Egira–Shin-Hashima corridor.

== Former rolling stock ==
Takehana Railway's initial electric fleet comprised the following wooden, four-wheel motor cars:

- De 1 class (1–4) – four cars built by Nagoya Densha Seisakusho in 1921, each with a capacity of 42 passengers. They retained their numbers after the Meitetsu merger. Cars 2 and 3 were later sold to Kumamoto Electric Railway, while cars 1 and 4 went to the Nokami Electric Railway.
- De 5 class (5–8) – four 40-passenger cars built by the same manufacturer in 1928. Cars 5 and 7 were later sold to Matsumoto Electric Railway; cars 6 and 8 became Meitetsu Mo 80 class cars 80 and 81 and continued to work the Takehana Line.

The company also ordered semi-steel bogie motor cars, but Meitetsu had taken it over by the time they were completed; the cars entered service as the first Meitetsu Mo 770 class.

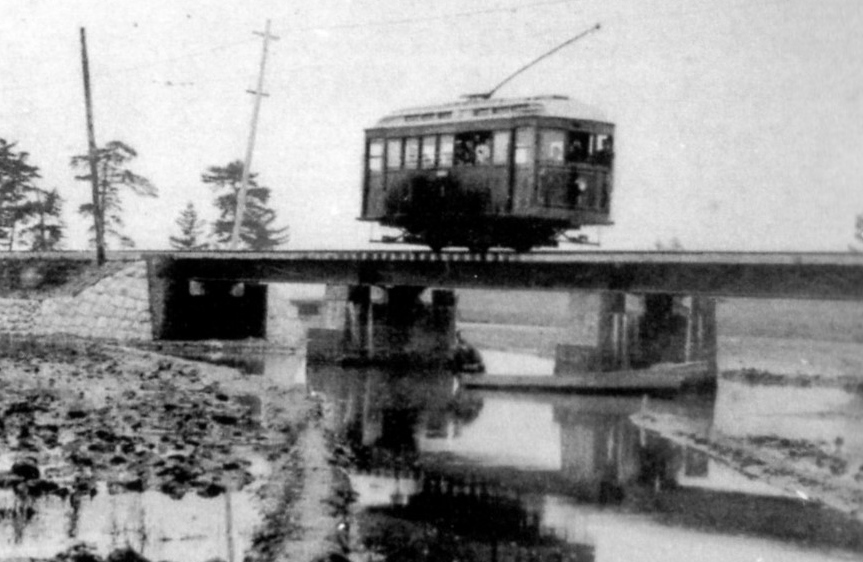
A Takehana Railway De 1 class car

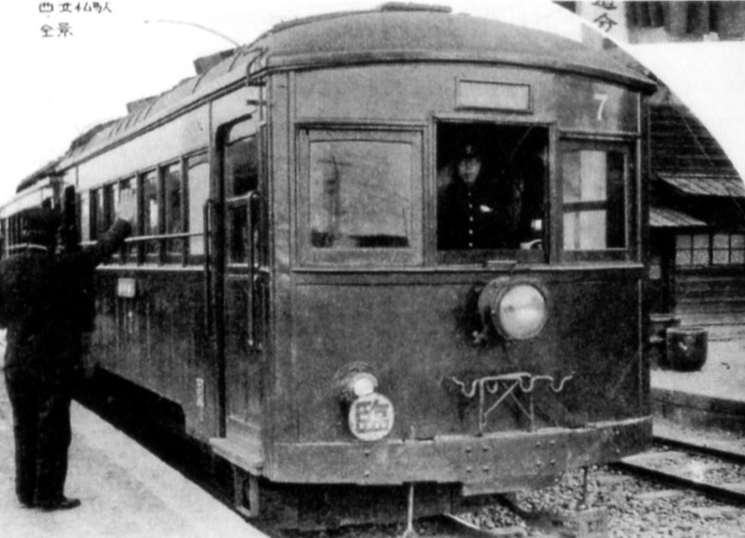
A Takehana Railway De 5 class car

== Stations ==
All stations are in Gifu Prefecture. All trains call at every station, and almost all continue from Egira to Shin-Hashima over the Hashima Line.

No.	Station	Japanese	Distance (km)		Connections	Passing loop	Location
No.	Station	Japanese	From previous	From Kasamatsu	Connections	Passing loop	Location
NH56	Kasamatsu	笠松	—	0.0	Meitetsu: Nagoya Main Line (limited through service toward Meitetsu Gifu)	—	Kasamatsu, Hashima District
TH01	Nishi-Kasamatsu	西笠松	0.9	0.9		Yes	Kasamatsu, Hashima District
TH02	Yanaizu	柳津	2.0	2.9		—	Gifu
TH03	Minami-Juku	南宿	2.3	5.2		Yes	Hashima
TH04	Suka	須賀	0.9	6.1		—	Hashima
TH05	Fuwa Ishiki	不破一色	0.9	7.0		—	Hashima
TH06	Takehana	竹鼻	1.6	8.6		—	Hashima
TH07	Hashima-shiyakusho-mae	羽島市役所前	1.0	9.6		Yes	Hashima
TH08	Egira	江吉良	0.7	10.3	Meitetsu: Hashima Line (through service)	—	Hashima

Until 15 March 2024, Meitetsu used 2.1 km (1.3 mi), rather than the 2.3 km (1.4 mi) operating distance, when calculating fares from Yanaizu toward Minami-Juku and stations on the Hashima Line. This special fare treatment, which dated from the relocation of Yanaizu station, ended with the 16 March 2024 fare revision.

=== Former Egira–Ōsu section ===
The following section closed on 1 October 2001. All stations were in Hashima.

Station	Japanese	Distance from previous (km)	Distance from Kasamatsu (km)	Notes
Egira	江吉良	—	10.3	Remains open
Makino	牧野	0.6	10.9	Closed with the section
Nagama	長間	0.6	11.5	Closed with the section
Nakaku	中区	0.7	12.2	Closed with the section
Ichinoeda	市之枝	1.2	13.4	Closed with the section
Yagami	八神	2.1	15.5	Closed with the section
Ōsu	大須	1.5	17.0	Closed with the section

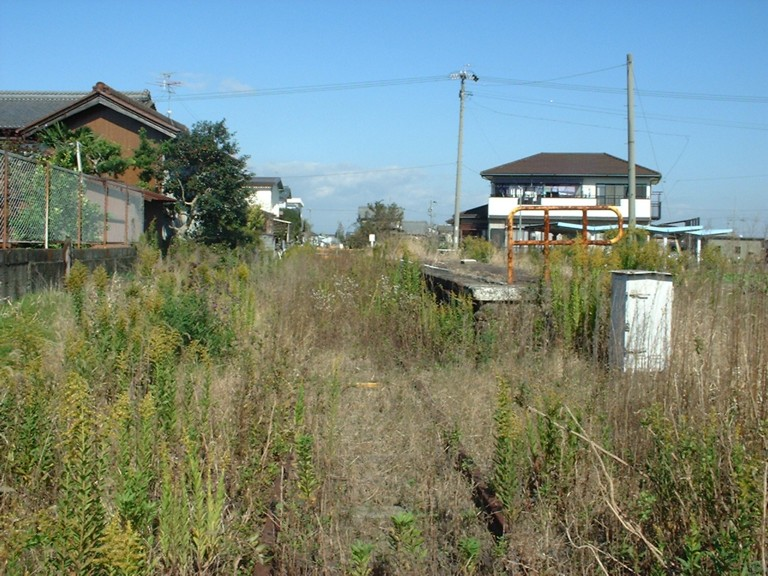
The site of Ichinoeda station after the 2001 closure

=== Other closed stations ===
- Kasamatsuguchi (between Kasamatsu and Nishi-Kasamatsu) – closed on 1 June 1942.
- The following stations were suspended in 1944 and formally closed on 5 April 1969:
  - Higashi-Suka and Higashi-Yanaizu (between Nishi-Kasamatsu and Yanaizu)
  - Kadoma (between Yanaizu and Minami-Juku)
  - Magari (between Fuwa Ishiki and Takehana)
  - Hongakuji-mae (between Takehana and Hashima-shiyakusho-mae)
  - Oki (between Nakaku and Ichinoeda on the later-closed section)
  - Mino-Ishida and Shōsenji-mae (between Ichinoeda and Yagami)
  - Kuwabara (between Yagami and Ōsu)

== Passenger numbers ==
Hashima City's public-transport plan reported that annual boardings at the seven Takehana and Hashima Line stations within the city rose by 14% between fiscal years 2009 and 2018. Growth was concentrated at Egira and Shin-Hashima, while boardings at Takehana and Hashima-shiyakusho-mae declined.

Annual boardings at stations in Hashima
Station	FY2009	FY2018
Minami-Juku	145,016	150,555
Suka	138,883	185,302
Fuwa Ishiki	161,232	227,298
Takehana	380,105	364,485
Hashima-shiyakusho-mae	382,051	357,234
Egira	193,618	262,283
Shin-Hashima (Hashima Line)	382,591	483,837
Total	1,783,496	2,030,994

== See also ==
- List of railway lines in Japan
