= Yanaizu Station (Gifu) =

Railway station in Kasamatsu, Gifu Prefecture, Japan

Yanaizu Station 柳津駅

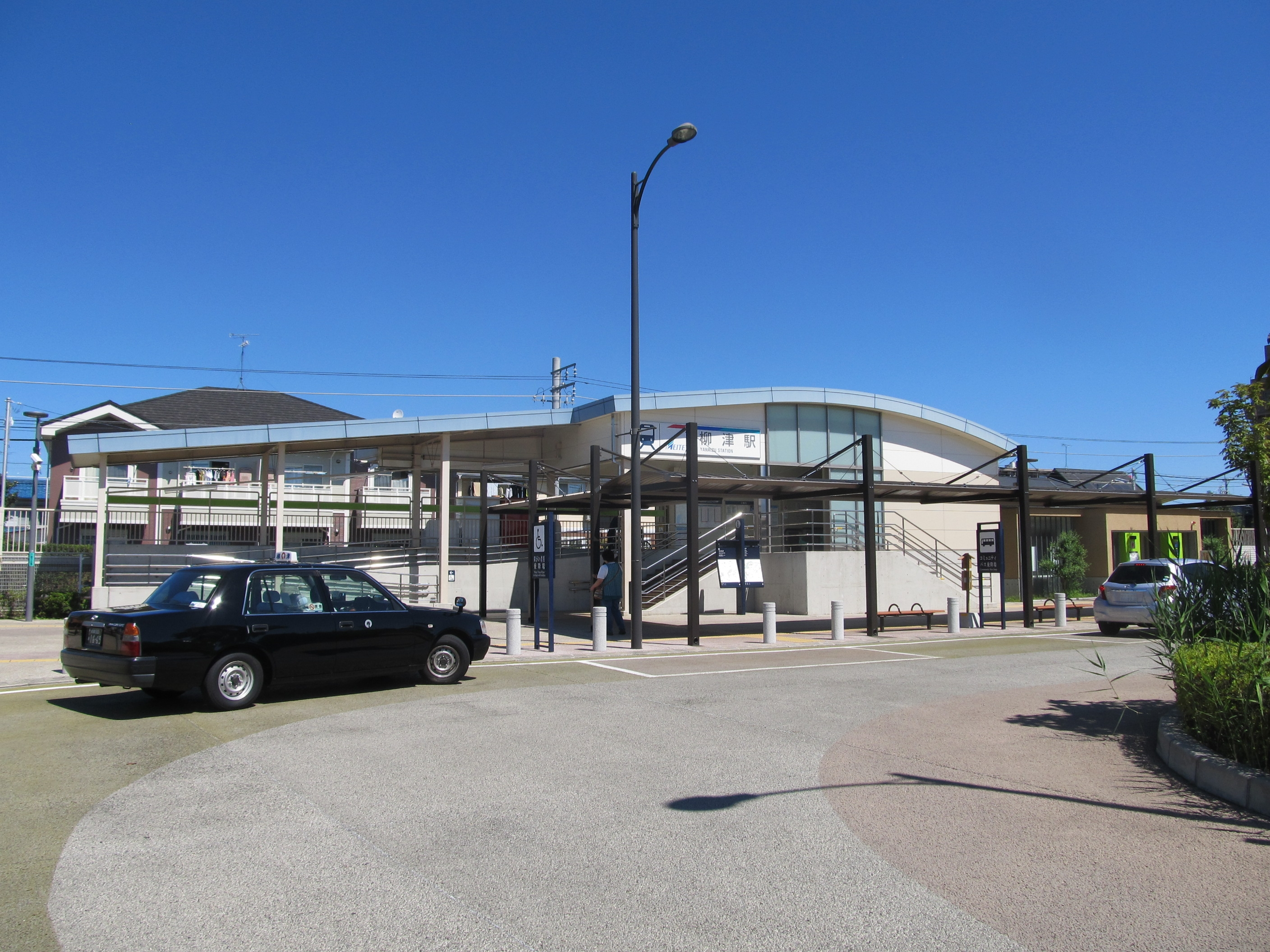
- Yanaizu Station, September 2014

General information
- Location: 1 Chome Yanaizu-chō Umematsu, Gifu-shi, Gifu-ken 501-6105; Japan
- Coordinates: 35.3651°N 136.74°E
- Operator: Meitetsu
- Line: ■ Meitetsu Takehana Line
- Distance: 2.9 km from Kasamatsu
- Platforms: 1 side platforms

Other information
- Status: Unstaffed
- Station code: TH02
- Website: Official website (in Japanese)

History
- Opened: June 25, 1921; 105 years ago
- Former names: Nishi-Yanaizu (to 1953)

Passengers
- FY2021: 3,372 daily

Services
Preceding station	Meitetsu	Following station
Nishi Kasamatsu towards Kasamatsu	Takehana Line	Minami-Juku towards Egira
Location
- Location within Japan

Yanaizu Station (柳津駅, Yanaizu-eki) is a railway station located in the city of Gifu, Gifu Prefecture, Japan, operated by the private railway operator Meitetsu.

== Lines ==
Yanaizu Station is a station on the Takehana Line, and is located 2.9 kilometers from the terminus of the line at Kasamatsu.

== Station layout ==
Yanaizu Station has one ground-level side platform serving a single bi-directional track on a sharp curve. The station is unattended.

=== Platforms ===
■ Meitetsu Takehana Line	For Shin-Hashima
■ Meitetsu Takehana Line	For Meitetsu Gifu

== History ==
Yanaizu Station opened on June 25, 1921 as Nishi-Yanaizu Station (西柳津駅). It was renamed Yanaizu Station on February 1, 1953.

== Surrounding area ==
- Former Yanaizu Town Hall
- Hashima Kita High School
- Colorful Town Gifu

== See also ==
- List of railway stations in Japan
