= Minami-Juku Station =

Railway station in Hashima, Gifu Prefecture, Japan

Minami Juku Station 南宿駅

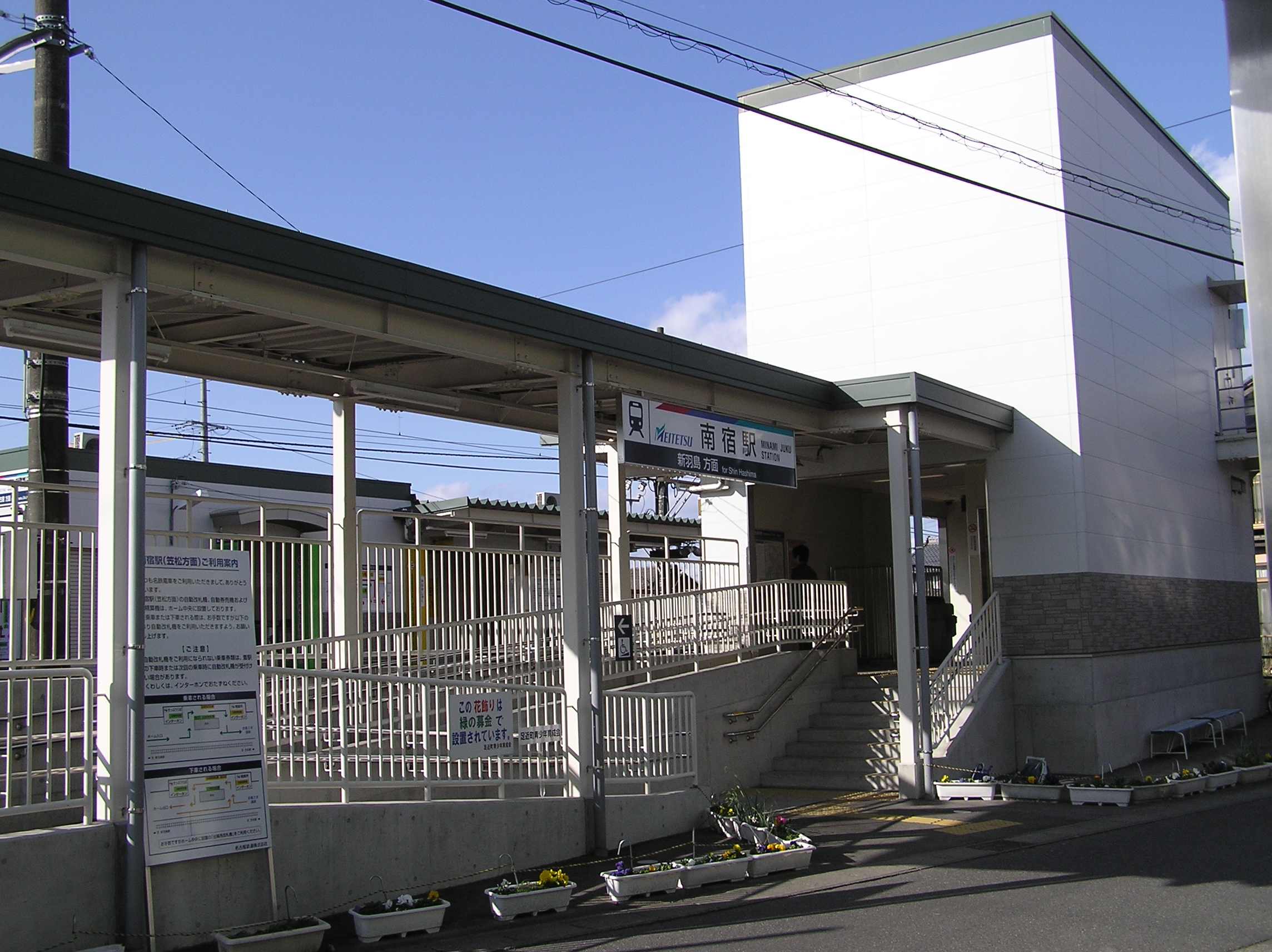
- Minami Juku Station in February 2010

General information
- Location: Ajika-cho Minamijuku, Hashima-shi, Gifu-ken 501-6203; Japan
- Coordinates: 35.3481°N 136.7288°E
- Operator: Meitetsu
- Line: ■ Meitetsu Takehana Line
- Distance: 5.2 km from Kasamatsu
- Platforms: 2 side platforms

Other information
- Status: Unstaffed
- Station code: TH03
- Website: Official website (in Japanese)

History
- Opened: June 25, 1921; 105 years ago

Passengers
- FY2015: 865 daily

Services
Preceding station	Meitetsu	Following station
Yanaizu towards Kasamatsu	Takehana Line	Suka towards Egira
Location
- Location within Gifu Prefecture Location within Japan

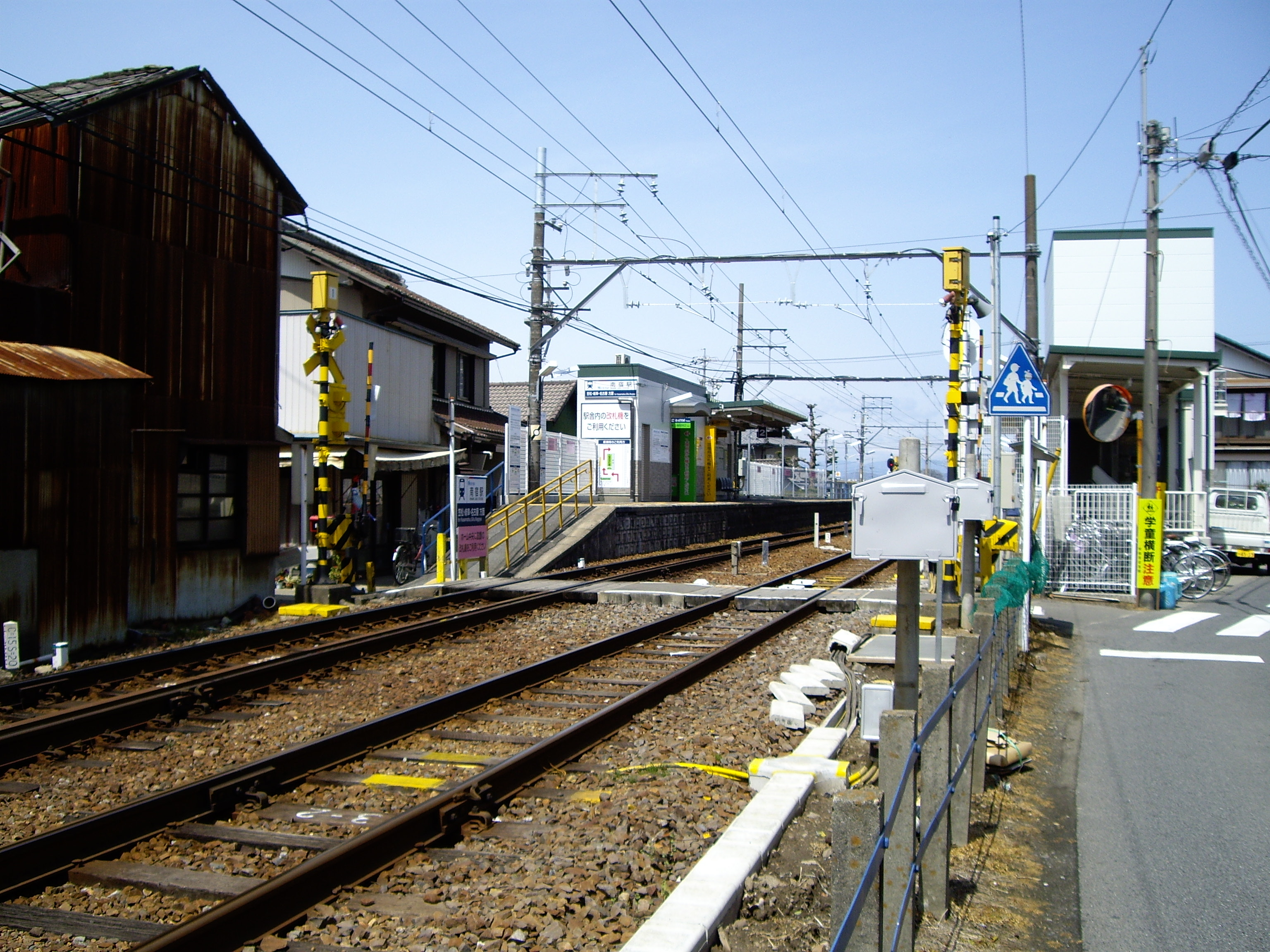
Minami-Juku Station

Minami Juku Station (南宿駅, Minami-Juku-eki) is a train station located in the city of Hashima, Gifu Prefecture, Japan, operated by the private railway operator Meitetsu.

== Lines ==
Minami Juku Station is a station on the Takehana Line, and is located 5.2 kilometers from the terminus of the line at Kasamatsu.

== Station layout ==
Minami Juku Station has two ground-level side platforms connected by a level crossing. The station is unattended.

=== Platforms ===
1	■ Meitetsu Takehana Line	For Shin-Hashima
2	■ Meitetsu Takehana Line	For Meitetsu Gifu

== History ==
Minami Juku Station opened on June 25, 1921.

== Surrounding area ==
- Azuka Elementary School

== See also ==
- List of railway stations in Japan
