= Takehana Station =

Railway station in Hashima, Gifu Prefecture, Japan

Takehana Station 竹鼻駅

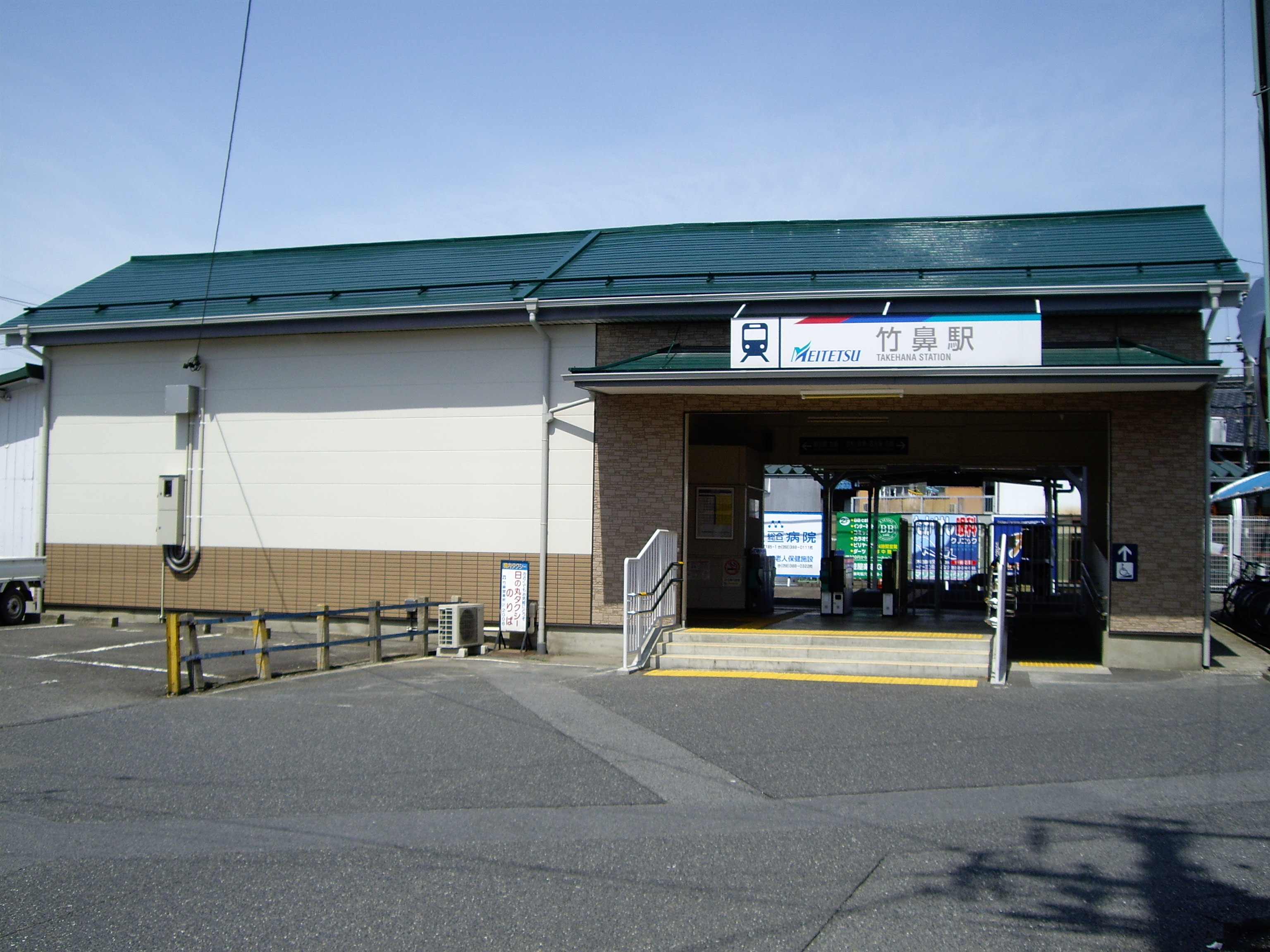
- Takehana Station in April 2008

General information
- Location: Takehana-cho Kitsuneana, Hashima-shi, Gifu-ken 501-6232; Japan
- Coordinates: 35.3269°N 136.7062°E
- Operator: Meitetsu
- Line: ■ Meitetsu Takehana Line
- Distance: 8.6 km from Kasamatsu
- Platforms: 1 side platform

Other information
- Status: Unstaffed
- Station code: TH06
- Website: Official website (in Japanese)

History
- Opened: June 25, 1921; 105 years ago
- Former names: Sakaemachi (栄町) (until 1951)

Passengers
- FY2016: 2,046 daily

Services
Preceding station	Meitetsu	Following station
Fuwa Ishiki towards Kasamatsu	Takehana Line	Hashima-shiyakusho-mae towards Egira
Location
- Location within Gifu Prefecture Location within Japan

Takehana Station (竹鼻駅, Takehana-eki) is a railway station located in the city of Hashima, Gifu Prefecture, Japan, operated by the private railway operator Meitetsu.

== Lines ==
Takehana Station is a station on the Takehana Line, and is located 8.6 kilometers from the terminus of the line at Kasamatsu.

== Station layout ==
Takehana Station has one ground-level side platform serving a single bi-directional track. The station is unattended.

■ Takehana Line	For Shin-Hashima
■ Takehana Line	For Meitetsu Gifu

== History ==
Takehana Station opened on June 25, 1921. On February 18, 1929, it changed its name to Sakaemachi Station (栄町駅). It reverted to its original name on January 1, 1951.

== Surrounding area ==
- Hakken Shrine
- Takehana Elementary School
- Hashima City Hospital

== See also ==
- List of railway stations in Japan
