= Nishi Kasamatsu Station =

Railway station in Kasamatsu, Gifu Prefecture, Japan

Nishi Kasamatsu Station 西笠松駅

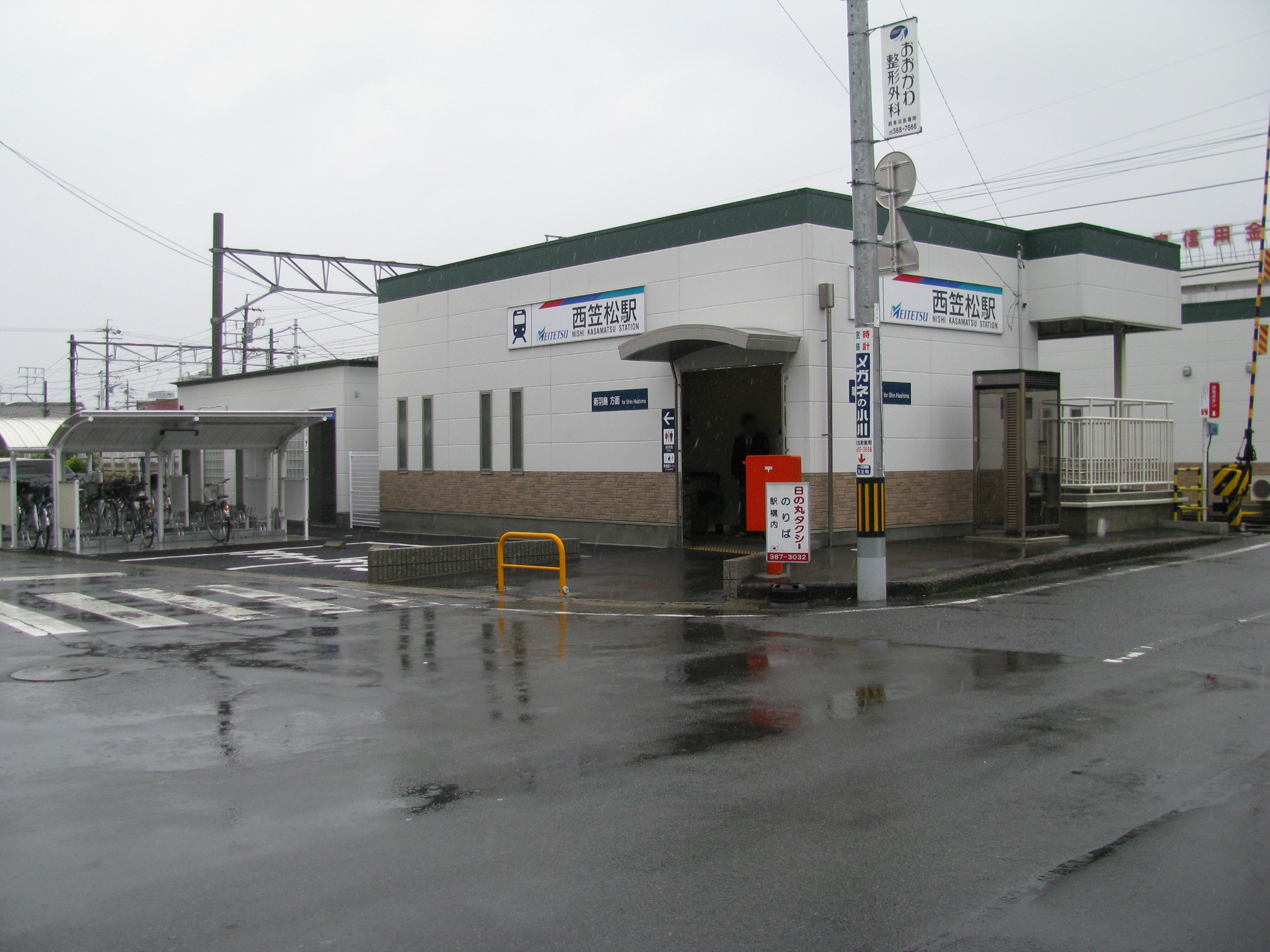
- Nishi Kasamatsu Station in April 2009

General information
- Location: 45 Tenno-cho, Kasamatsu-machi, Hashima-gun, Gifu-ken 501-6077; Japan
- Coordinates: 35.3688°N 136.7579°E
- Operator: Meitetsu
- Line: ■ Meitetsu Takehana Line
- Distance: 0.9 km from Kasamatsu
- Platforms: 2 side platforms

Other information
- Status: Unstaffed
- Station code: TH01
- Website: Official website (in Japanese)

History
- Opened: June 25, 1921; 105 years ago

Passengers
- FY2015: 1,116 daily

Services
Preceding station	Meitetsu	Following station
Kasamatsu Terminus	Takehana Line	Yanaizu towards Egira
Location
- Location within Gifu Prefecture Location within Japan

Nishi Kasamatsu Station (西笠松駅, Nishi-Kasamatsu-eki) is a railway station located in the town of Kasamatsu, Hashima District, Gifu Prefecture, Japan, operated by the private railway operator Meitetsu.

== Lines ==
Nishi Kasamatsu Station is a station on the Takehana Line, and is located 0.9 kilometers from the terminus of the line at Kasamatsu.

== Station layout ==
Nishi Kasamatsu Station has two ground-level side platforms connected by a level crossing. The station is unattended.

=== Platforms ===
1	■ Meitetsu Takehana Line	For Shin-Hashima
2	■ Meitetsu Takehana Line	For Meitetsu Gifu

== History ==
Nishi Kasamatsu Station opened on June 25, 1921 as Shin-Kasamatsu Station (新笠松駅). It was named Kasamatsu Station in September of the same year, and became Nishi-Kasamatsu Station in May 1936.

== Surrounding area ==
- Kasamatsu Town Hall
- Kasamatsu Elementary School

== See also ==
- List of railway stations in Japan
