= Hashima-shiyakusho-mae Station =

Railway station in Hashima, Gifu Prefecture, Japan

Hashima-shiyakusho-mae Station 羽島市役所前駅

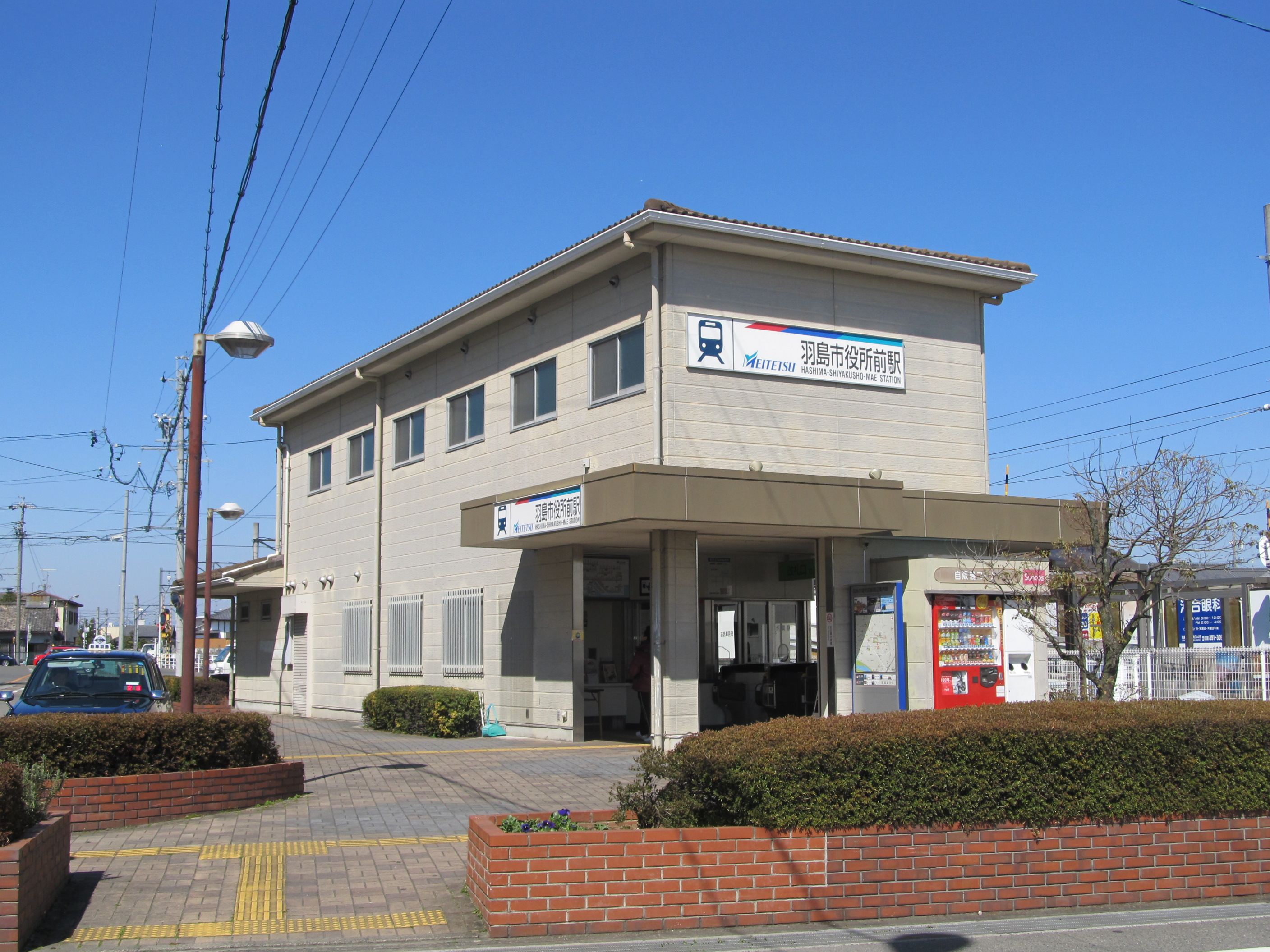
- Hashima-shiyakusho-mae Station in March 2015

General information
- Location: 761 Takehana-cho, Hashima-shi, Gifu-ken 501-6241; Japan
- Coordinates: 35.3217°N 136.6990°E
- Operator: Meitetsu
- Line: ■ Meitetsu Takehana Line
- Distance: 9.6 km from Kasamatsu
- Platforms: 1 island platform

Other information
- Status: Staffed
- Station code: TH07
- Website: Official website (in Japanese)

History
- Opened: April 4, 1929; 97 years ago
- Former names: Takehana (1929-1951); Nishi-Takehana (1951-959); Hashima (until 1982)

Passengers
- FY2015: 2,064 daily

Services
Preceding station	Meitetsu	Following station
Takehana towards Kasamatsu	Takehana Line	Egira Terminus
Location
- Location within Gifu Prefecture Location within Japan

Hashima-shiyakusho-mae Station (羽島市役所前駅, Hashima-shiyakusho-mae-eki) is a railway station located in the city of Hashima, Gifu Prefecture, Japan, operated by the private railway operator Meitetsu.

== Lines ==
Hashima-shiyakusho-mae Station is a station on the Takehana Line, and is located 9.6 kilometers from the terminus of the line at Kasamatsu.

== Station layout ==
Hashima-shiyakusho-mae Station has one ground-level island platform connected by a level crossing. The station is staffed.

=== Platforms ===
1	■ Takehana Line	For Shin-Hashima
2	■ Takehana Line	For Kasamatsu and Meitetsu Gifu

== History ==
Hashima-shiyakusho-mae Station opened on April 4, 1929 as Takehana Station (竹鼻駅). It was named Nishi-Takehana Station (西竹鼻駅) on January 1, 1951, and became Hashima Station (羽島駅) in on April 1, 1959. It was renamed to its present name on December 11, 1982.

== Surrounding area ==
- Hashima City Hall
- Hashima High School
- Takehana Junior High School

== See also ==
- List of railway stations in Japan
