= Hashima, Gifu =

Hashima 羽島市
- City
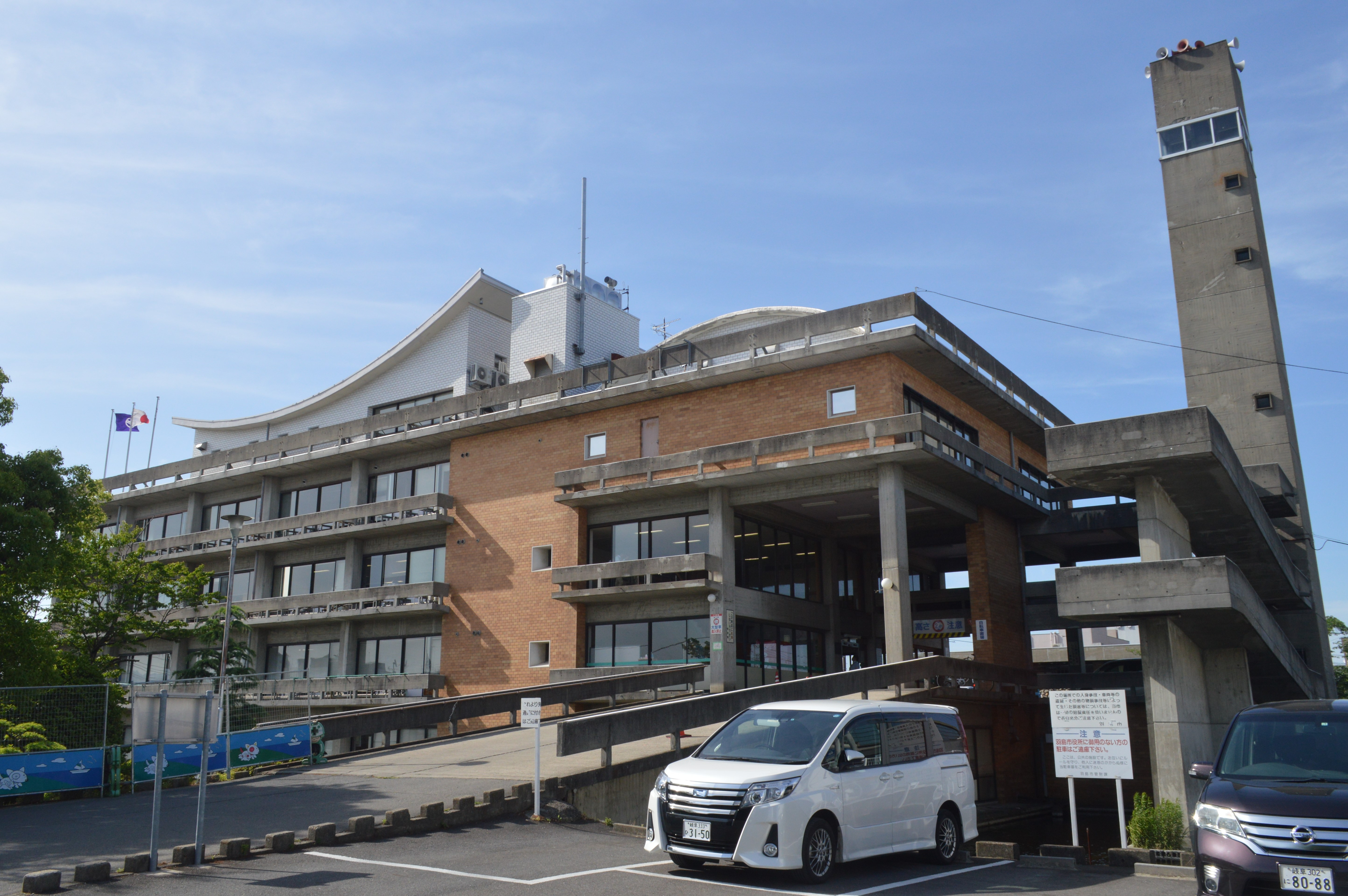
- Hashima City Hall

- Flag Seal

- Location of Hashima in Gifu Prefecture

- Coordinates: 35°19′11.8″N 136°42′11.8″E
- Country: Japan
- Region: Chūbu
- Prefecture: Gifu

Area
  - Total: 53.66 km^{2} (20.72 sq mi)

Population (January 1, 2019)
  - Total: 67,909
  - Density: 1,266/km^{2} (3,278/sq mi)
- Time zone: UTC+9 (Japan Standard Time)
- City symbols
- Tree: Juniperus chinensis L. 'Kaizuka'
- Flower: Mino Chrysanthemum
- Phone number: 058-392-1111
- Address: 55 Takehana-chō, Hashima-shi, Gifu-ken 501-6292
- Website: Official website

Hashima (羽島市, Hashima-shi) is a city located in Gifu, Japan. As of 1 January 2019, the city had an estimated population of 67,909 in 26,327 households, and a population density of 1300 persons per km^{2}, in 26,367 households. The total area of the city is 53.66 square kilometres (20.72 sq mi).

== Geography ==
Hashima is located in the Nōbi Plain of southwest Gifu Prefecture, with the Kiso River to the east and the Nagara River to the west. Much of the city area is low-lying and subject to frequent flooding.

=== Climate ===
The city has a climate characterized by characterized by hot and humid summers, and mild winters (Köppen climate classification Cfa). The average annual temperature in Hashima is 15.5 °C. The average annual rainfall is 1849 mm with September as the wettest month. The temperatures are highest on average in August, at around 27.8 °C, and lowest in January, at around 4.1 °C.

=== Neighbouring municipalities ===
- Aichi Prefecture
  - Ichinomiya
  - Inazawa
- Gifu Prefecture
  - Anpachi
  - Gifu
  - Kaizu
  - Kasamatsu
  - Ōgaki
  - Wanouchi

== Demographics ==
Per Japanese census data, the population of Hashima has recently plateaued after a long period of growth.

Historical population
Year	Pop.	±%
1970	48,075	—
1980	56,975	+18.5%
1990	61,460	+7.9%
2000	64,713	+5.3%
2010	67,197	+3.8%
2020	65,649	−2.3%

== History ==
The area around Hashima was part of traditional Mino Province. During the Edo period, most of the area was divided between territory under the control of Owari Domain, and tenryō territory under the direct control of the Tokugawa shogunate. During the post-Meiji restoration cadastral reforms, the area was organised into Hashima District, Gifu. On July 1, 1889 with the establishment of the modern municipalities system, the town of Takenohana was created. On April 1, 1954 Takenohana merged with nine neighbouring villages to form the city of Hashima.

== Government ==
Hashima has a mayor-council form of government with a directly elected mayor and a unicameral city legislature of 18 members.

== Economy ==
Hashima is a regional commercial center, with agriculture and light industry, notably that of woven cloth dominating the local economy.

== Education ==
Hashima has eight public elementary schools and five public middle schools operated by the city government, and one public high school operated by the Gifu Prefectural Board of Education. The prefecture also operates one special education school. The Gifu College of Nursing is located in Hashima.

== Transportation ==
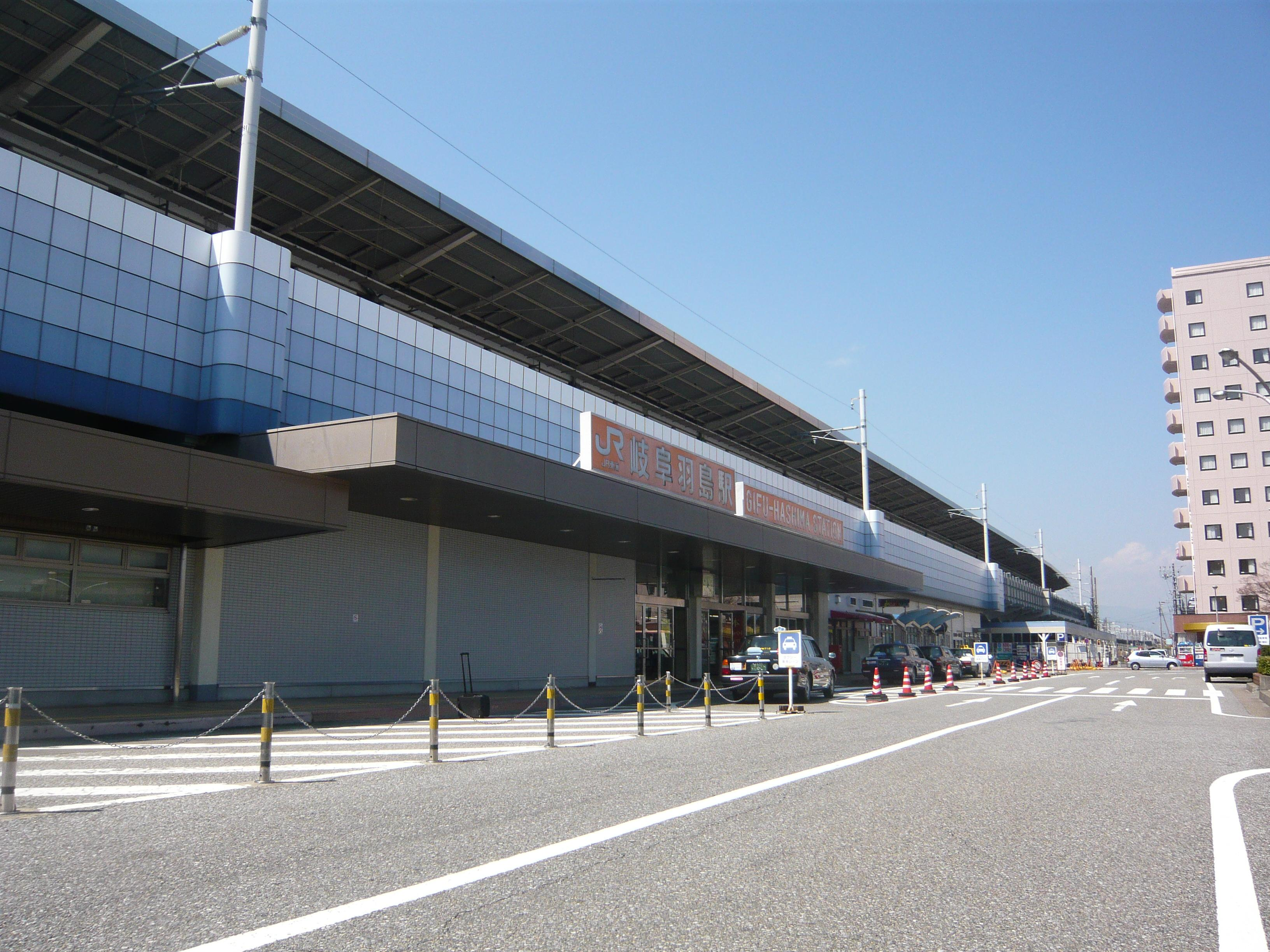
Gifu-Hashima Station

=== Railway ===
- Central Japan Railway Company (JR Tōkai) - Tōkaidō Shinkansen
  - Gifu-Hashima
- Meitetsu - Takehana Line
  - Minami-Juku - Suka - Fuwa-Ishiki - Takehana - Hashimashiyakushomae - Egira
- Meitetsu - Hashima Line
  - Egira - Shin-Hashima

=== Highway ===
- Meishin Expressway
