= Umamusume: Cinderella Gray =

Japanese manga spinoff series of Umamusume: Pretty Derby

- Final tankōbon volume cover, featuring Oguri Cap

ウマ娘 シンデレラグレイ (Umamusume Shinderera Gurei)
- Genre: Sports; Drama
- Created by: Cygames
- Manga
- Written by: Masafumi Sugiura
- Illustrated by: Taiyou Kuzumi
- Published by: Shueisha
- Imprint: Young Jump Comics
- Magazine: Weekly Young Jump
- Original run: 11 June 2020 – 25 December 2025
- Volumes: 23
- Anime television series
- Directed by: Yūki Itō; Takehiro Miura
- Written by: Aki Kindaichi
- Music by: Kenji Kawai
- Studio: CygamesPictures
- Licensed by: Remow; SEA: Netflix
- Original network: JNN (TBS)
- Original run: 6 April 2025 – 21 December 2025
- Episodes: 23
- icon

Umamusume: Cinderella Gray (ウマ娘 シンデレラグレイ, Umamusume Shinderera Gurei) is a Japanese manga series written by Masafumi Sugiura and illustrated by Taiyou Kuzumi. It is a spinoff entry in the wider Umamusume: Pretty Derby franchise created by Cygames, and is based on the career of Oguri Cap. The series was serialized in Shueisha's Weekly Young Jump from June 2020 to December 2025, with its chapters having been collected in 23 tankōbon volumes. An anime television series adaptation produced by CygamesPictures ran from April to December 2025.

Both the anime and manga received strong reviews from critics, with the anime winning, amongst other awards, the Anime Trending Awards' Anime of the Year. In Japan, a collaboration event between the series and Kasamatsu Racecourse, the real Oguri Cap's hometown course, led to a record number of visitors visiting the track, and the series being credited with the racecourse's revitalisation after its reputation had been tarnished from a race-fixing scandal the year prior.

== Plot ==
Oguri Cap is a young racer with an insatiable appetite who starts as a regional racer in her hometown of Kasamatsu. She catches the attention of up-and-coming Umamusume trainer Jo Kitahara, and he aims to train her to the best of her abilities with the help of her friend Belno Light. Oguri Cap eventually transitions to the high-profile Twinkle Series races, where she makes her mark as a national idol while competing against the best domestic and international Umamusume of her generation.

== Media ==
=== Manga ===
Written by Masafumi Sugiura, produced by Junnosuke Itō, and illustrated by Taiyō Kuzumi, the series was serialized in Shueisha's Weekly Young Jump from 11 June 2020, to 25 December 2025. The first collected tankōbon volume was released on 19 January 2021. As of March 2026, twenty-three volumes have been released.

==== Volumes ====
No.	Release date	ISBN
1	19 January 2021	978-4-08-891705-4
2	19 February 2021	978-4-08-891795-5
3	19 May 2021	978-4-08-891896-9
4	18 August 2021	978-4-08-892050-4
5	17 December 2021	978-4-08-892077-1
6	18 February 2022	978-4-08-892223-2
7	18 May 2022	978-4-08-892302-4
8	19 August 2022	978-4-08-892401-4
9	19 December 2022	978-4-08-892533-2
10	17 March 2023	978-4-08-892657-5
11	19 June 2023	978-4-08-892785-5
12	19 September 2023	978-4-08-892824-1
13	19 December 2023	978-4-08-893104-3
14	18 March 2024	978-4-08-893121-0
15	19 June 2024	978-4-08-893239-2
16	19 September 2024	978-4-08-893379-5
17	18 December 2024	978-4-08-893583-6
18	18 March 2025	978-4-08-893476-1
19	17 April 2025	978-4-08-893649-9
20	18 June 2025	978-4-08-893694-9
21	19 September 2025	978-4-08-893797-7
22	18 December 2025	978-4-08-894028-1
23	18 March 2026	978-4-08-894089-2

=== Anime ===
An anime television series adaptation was announced on 23 August 2024. It is produced by Cypic and directed by Yūki Itō and Takehiro Miura, with Aki Kindaichi handling series composition, Takuya Miyahara and Keigo Sasaki designing the characters, and Kenji Kawai composing the music. The series aired in two split cours on TBS and its affiliates, with the first cours airing from 6 April to 29 June 2025, and the second cours airing from 5 October to 21 December 2025. For the first cours, the opening theme is "Koeru" (超える; "Surpass"), performed by Alexandros, while the ending theme is "∞" (Infinity), performed by Oguri Cap (Tomoyo Takayanagi). For the second cours, the opening theme is "Spurt Syndromer" (スパートシンドローマー), performed by 10-Feet, while the ending theme is "Futari" (ふたり; Us), performed by Oguri Cap (Tomoyo Takayanagi) and Tamamo Cross (Naomi Ōzora). Remow licensed the series for streaming on Amazon Prime Video (North America), the It's Anime YouTube channel (select regions), Anime Onegai (Latin America) and ADN (Europe). Netflix is streaming the series in Asia-Pacific.

==== Episodes ====
No.	Title	Directed by	Storyboarded by	Original release date
Part 1
1	"Finally, a Star"; Transliteration: "Koko ni Iru" (Japanese: ここにいる)	Tetsuya Akutsu & Ryūta Kawahara	Yuuki Ito	April 6, 2025
2	"Let Me Race"; Transliteration: "Watashi o Rēsu ni Dashite" (Japanese: 私をレースに出して)	Kenta Hayashi	Takashi Sakuma	April 13, 2025
3	"View from the Top"; Transliteration: "Itadaki no Keshiki" (Japanese: 頂の景色)	Takashi Narikawa	Yuuki Ito, Tetsuya Akutsu & Takashi Sakuma	April 20, 2025
4	"The Junior Crown"; Transliteration: "Junia Kuraun" (Japanese: ジュニアクラウン)	Takehiro Shimizu	Takehiro Shimizu	April 27, 2025
5	"What's Best for Her"; Transliteration: "Ichiban no Sentaku" (Japanese: 一番の選択)	Kazuki Horiguchi	Kazuki Horiguchi	May 4, 2025
6	"The Beast"; Transliteration: "Kaibutsu" (Japanese: 怪物)	Takehiro Miura & Haruka Hirota	Takehiro Miura	May 11, 2025
7	"Tracen Academy"; Transliteration: "Toresen Gakuen" (Japanese: トレセン学園)	Yūsuke Kurinishi	Ryūta Kawahara	May 18, 2025
8	"The Right Stuff"; Transliteration: "Tadashiki Shishitsu" (Japanese: 正しき資質)	Hidetoshi Watanabe	Shoko Shiga	May 25, 2025
9	"The Japanese Derby"; Transliteration: "Nippon Dābī" (Japanese: 日本ダービー)	Motomasa Maeda	Tetsuya Akutsu	June 1, 2025
10	"The Top"; Transliteration: "Saikyō" (Japanese: 最強)	Yorihiro Tanimoto	Yuki Ishimatsu	June 8, 2025
11	"The Star of Kasamatsu"; Transliteration: "Kasamatsu no Hoshi" (Japanese: カサマツの星)	Yuki Morishita	Yuki Morishita	June 15, 2025
12	"The Fall Tenno Sho"; Transliteration: "Tennōshō (Aki)" (Japanese: 天皇賞（秋）)	migmi	Takashi Sakuma	June 22, 2025
13	"Japan's Best"; Transliteration: "Nippon Ichi" (Japanese: 日本ー)	Takudai Kakuchi & Daisuke Tsukushi	Takudai Kakuchi	June 29, 2025
Part 2
14	"Another Peak to Climb"; Transliteration: "Aratana Yama" (Japanese: 新たな山)	Shōgo Ono	Shōgo Ono & Tetsuya Miyanishi	October 5, 2025
15	"Our Story"; Transliteration: "Bokutachi no Monogatari" (Japanese: 僕達の物語)	Yūsuke Kurinishi	Yūsuke Kurinishi	October 12, 2025
16	"The World's Best"; Transliteration: "Sekai Reberu" (Japanese: 世界レベル)	Haruka Hirota	Kurimanjū	October 19, 2025
17	"The Japan Cup"; Transliteration: "Japan Kappu" (Japanese: ジャパンカップ)	Yūto Nakamura & Takashi Narikawa	Takashi Narikawa	November 2, 2025
18	"Wild Joker"	Motomasa Maeda	Shintaro Matsui & Kengo Matsumoto	November 9, 2025
19	"A Zone Yet Unknown"; Transliteration: "Michi no "Ryōiki"" (Japanese: 未知の"領域")	Yorihiro Tanimoto & Hidetoshi Watanabe	Yorihiro Tanimoto & Hidetoshi Watanabe	November 23, 2025
20	"The Answer"; Transliteration: "Kotae" (Japanese: 答え)	Ichirō Tanaka & Takehiro Shimizu	Takehiro Shimizu	November 30, 2025
21	"The Arima Kinen"; Transliteration: "Arima Kinen" (Japanese: 有マ記念 (Note: The eponymous race is rendered as 有馬記念, but with the character for horse (馬, uma) written with two legs instead of four.))	Ryo Asahi & Zhe Liu	Seiji Ishigami	December 7, 2025
22	"Gray Phantom"; Transliteration: "Gurei Fantomu" (Japanese: 灰の怪物(グレイファントム))	Jun Fujiwara, Kōhei Kido & Takehiro Miura	Jun Fujiwara	December 14, 2025
23	"A New Era"; Transliteration: "Atarashī Jidai" (Japanese: 新しい時代)	Haruka Hirota, Motomasa Maeda & Takuma Suzuki	Yoshinori Nakano	December 21, 2025

== Reception ==
The manga series was nominated in the seventh Next Manga Awards for the Best Print Manga category and placed second of 50 nominees after Oshi no Ko.

Between April and June 2025, the anime series was ranked number one in the world in the AniLab Global Weekly Anime Rankings a total of four times. In the spring 2025 season, it took first place in the weekly rankings of Anime Trending, a major voting site for overseas anime fans, in its seventh week, beating out Weekly Shonen Jump's Witch Watch, and continued to hold the top spot until the final episode. Uma Musume Cinderella Gray took first place in the weekly rankings of Anime Trending for the fall 2025 season, and won the Best Anime of 2025.

The series later won the Spring Anime Award on Anime Corner. It was described as a "true Cinderella story" as the first time in history that a series topped the final ranking despite not having topped the weekly rankings. Overseas fans and viewers commented on the series' late-stage comeback, saying it was "just like Oguri Cap (from the series)".

=== Awards and nominations ===
Year	Award	Category	Recipient(s)	Result	Ref.
2026	12th Anime Trending Awards	Anime of the Year	Umamusume: Cinderella Gray	Won	
2026	12th Anime Trending Awards	Girl of the Year	Oguri Cap	Won	
2026	12th Anime Trending Awards	Supporting Boy of the Year	Jo Kitahara	Won	
2026	12th Anime Trending Awards	Supporting Girl of the Year	Belno Light	Won	
2026	12th Anime Trending Awards	Best in Adapted Screenplay	Umamusume: Cinderella Gray	Won	
2026	12th Anime Trending Awards	Best in Animation	Umamusume: Cinderella Gray	Won	
2026	12th Anime Trending Awards	Best in Character Design	Umamusume: Cinderella Gray	Won	
2026	12th Anime Trending Awards	Ending Song of the Year	"∞" by Tomoyo Takayanagi	Nominated	
2026	12th Anime Trending Awards	Best in Soundtrack	Umamusume: Cinderella Gray	Nominated	
2026	12th Anime Trending Awards	Best Voice Acting Performance — Female	Tomoyo Takayanagi as Oguri Cap	Nominated	
2026	12th Anime Trending Awards	Drama Anime of the Year	Umamusume: Cinderella Gray	Nominated	
2026	12th Anime Trending Awards	Sports Anime of the Year	Umamusume: Cinderella Gray	Won	
2026	Japan Expo Awards	Daruma for Best Anime	Umamusume: Cinderella Gray	Nominated	
2026	Japan Expo Awards	Daruma for Best Action Anime	Umamusume: Cinderella Gray	Nominated	
2026	Japan Expo Awards	Daruma for Best Opening	"Koeru" by Alexandros	Nominated	
