= Kasamatsu Racecourse =

Horse racing venue in Gifu, Japan

Kasamatsu Racecourse 笠松競馬場
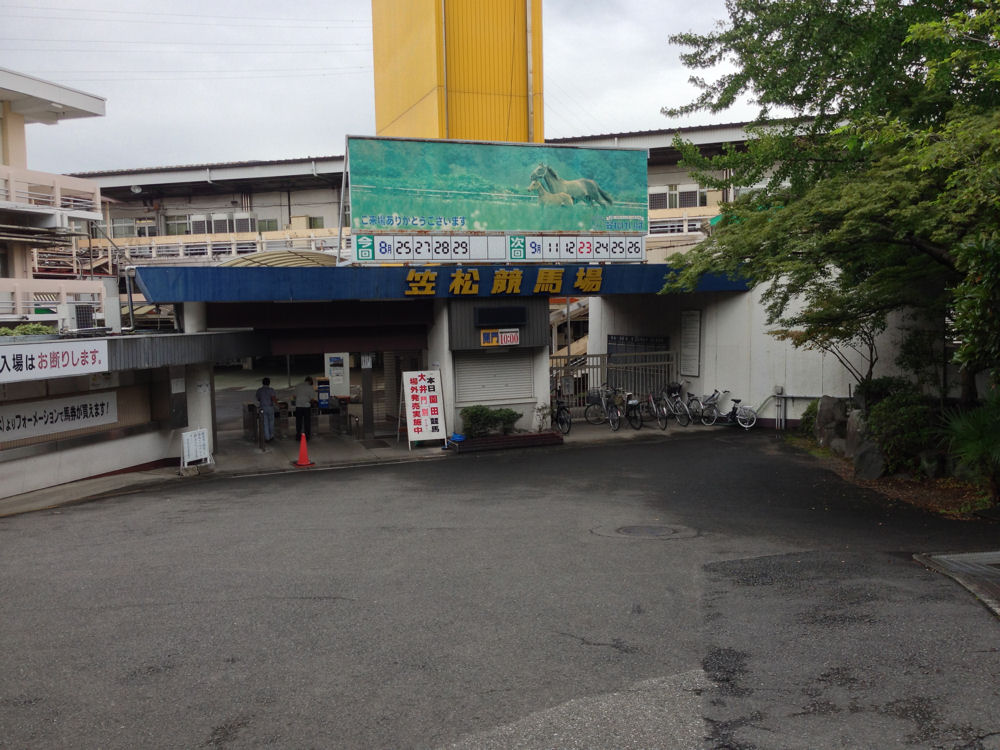
- Interactive map of Kasamatsu Racecourse 笠松競馬場
- Location: Kasamatsu, Gifu, Japan
- Coordinates: 35°22′19.8″N 136°46′3.1″E
- Owned by: Gifu Prefecture Racing Association
- Date opened: 1935 (91 years ago)
- Capacity: 16,000
- Race type: Thoroughbred flat racing
- Course type: Dirt

Kasamatsu Racecourse (笠松競馬場, Kasamatsu-keibajō) is a Japanese racecourse located in Kasamatsu, Hashima, Gifu, Japan. Operated by the Gifu Prefecture Racing Association under the National Association of Racing. It was established in 1934 following the relocation of the Nakatsu Racecourse (中津競馬場, Nakatsu-keibajō) in Nakatsu, Oita.

== Overview ==
Kasamatsu Racecourse is known as the place where Katsumi Ando—the first jockey to transfer from local to central horse racing—began his career, alongside Mitsuaki Ando and Yuichi Shibayama, who also later transferred. Moreover, it is widely known for producing many famous horses since the 1980s, such as Fate Northern, Oguri Cap, Max Fleet, Oguri Roman, Raiden Leader, Legend Hunter, and Love Michan. In 2004, it was given the nickname "Dream Stadium: the Home of Famous Horses and Famous Jockeys," which is used in various public relations campaigns.

Kasamatsu Racecourse is located on the bank of the Kiso River, within a 3-minute walk of Kasamatsu Station on the Meitetsu Nagoya Main Line.

The stables are located quite a distance away from the racecourse. During training, the horses have to walk from Enjoji Stable (Enjoji, Kasamatsu) and Yakushiji Stable (Yakushiji, Ginan) to the track. In particular, there are some sections on the horse trail extending to Enjoji Stable—about 1.5 kilometers to the east—that intersect and pass through public roads, so security guards are in charge of ensuring safety during transport.

Previously, there were two pedestrian crossings on Gifu Prefectural Road Route 178 with traffic signals set at elevated heights so jockeys would not have to dismount (as of 2024, these signals were removed). However, several past incidents in which racehorses escaped onto public roads or were involved in traffic accidents have raised safety concerns. To prevent future accidents, there are plans to decommission Enjoji Stable, build a new stable in the parking lot on the west side of the racecourse, and expand Yakushiji Stable.

=== Course Overview ===
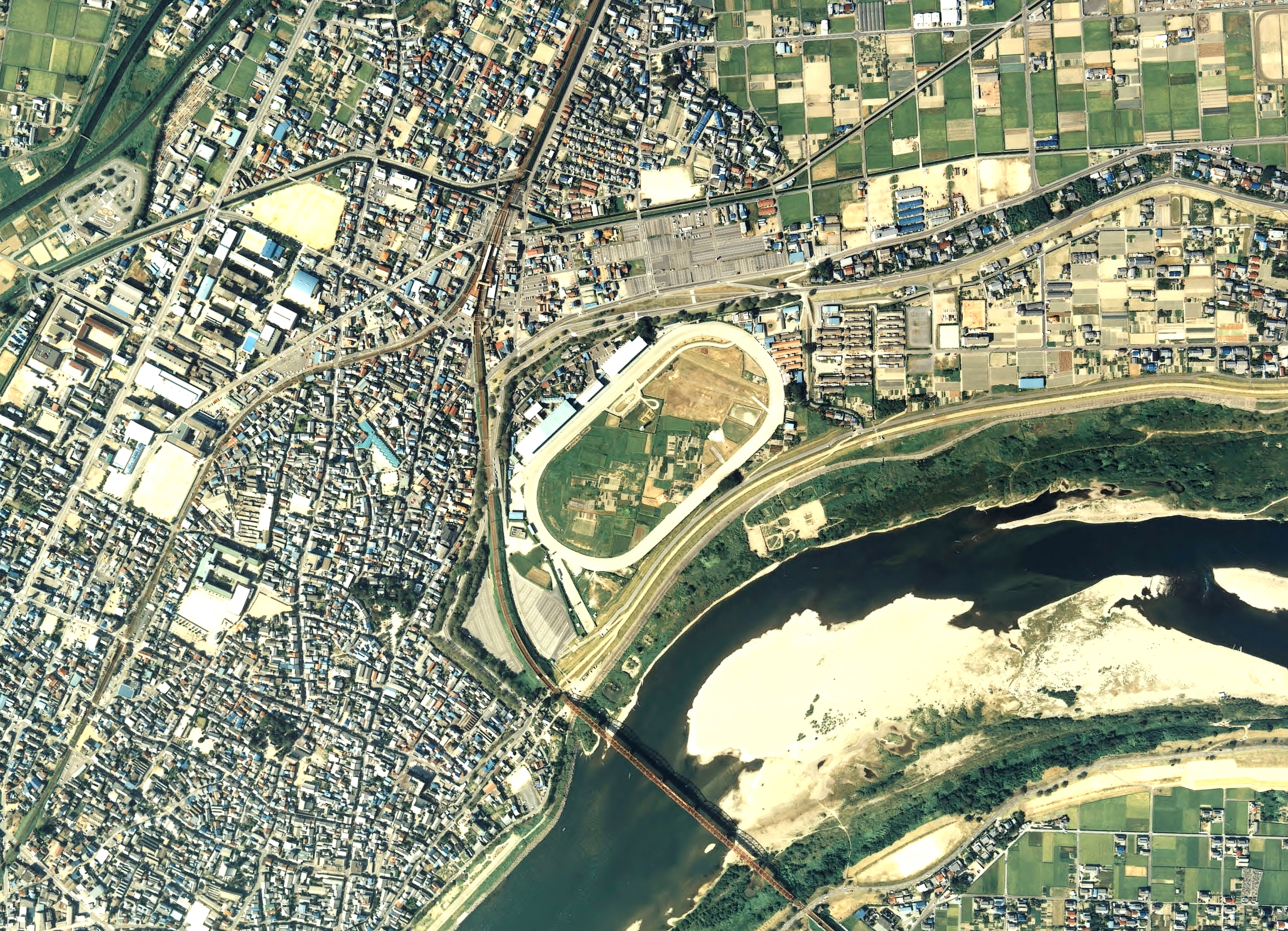
Aerial Photograph of the Kasamatsu Racecourse in 1987

Dirt Course : Clockwise (right-handed)
Circumference : 1,100 meters
Width : 20 meters
Length of straight : 238 meters
Number of horses allowed : Up to 12 horses (Note: Previously, Kasamatsu Racecourse was the only local track limited to a maximum capacity of 10 horses. However, after the Japan Racing Association (JRA) donated a 12-horse starting gate and the display screen was upgraded, the first 12-horse race was held on September 11, 2019.)
Distance : 800 meters · 1,400 meters · 1,580 meters · 1,800 meters · 1,900 meters · 2,500 meters

Due to the aforementioned stable relocation, the starting point for the 1,600 meters race was moved 20 meters forward, distance will be shorten to 1,580 meters since March 30, 2026. The 1,580 meters distance was previously used for a little over two years, from July 1974 to October 1976. However, historical records from that era will not apply; instead, winning times will serve as temporary standards until March 2027, and official course records will be tracked starting in April 2027.

== Notable races ==
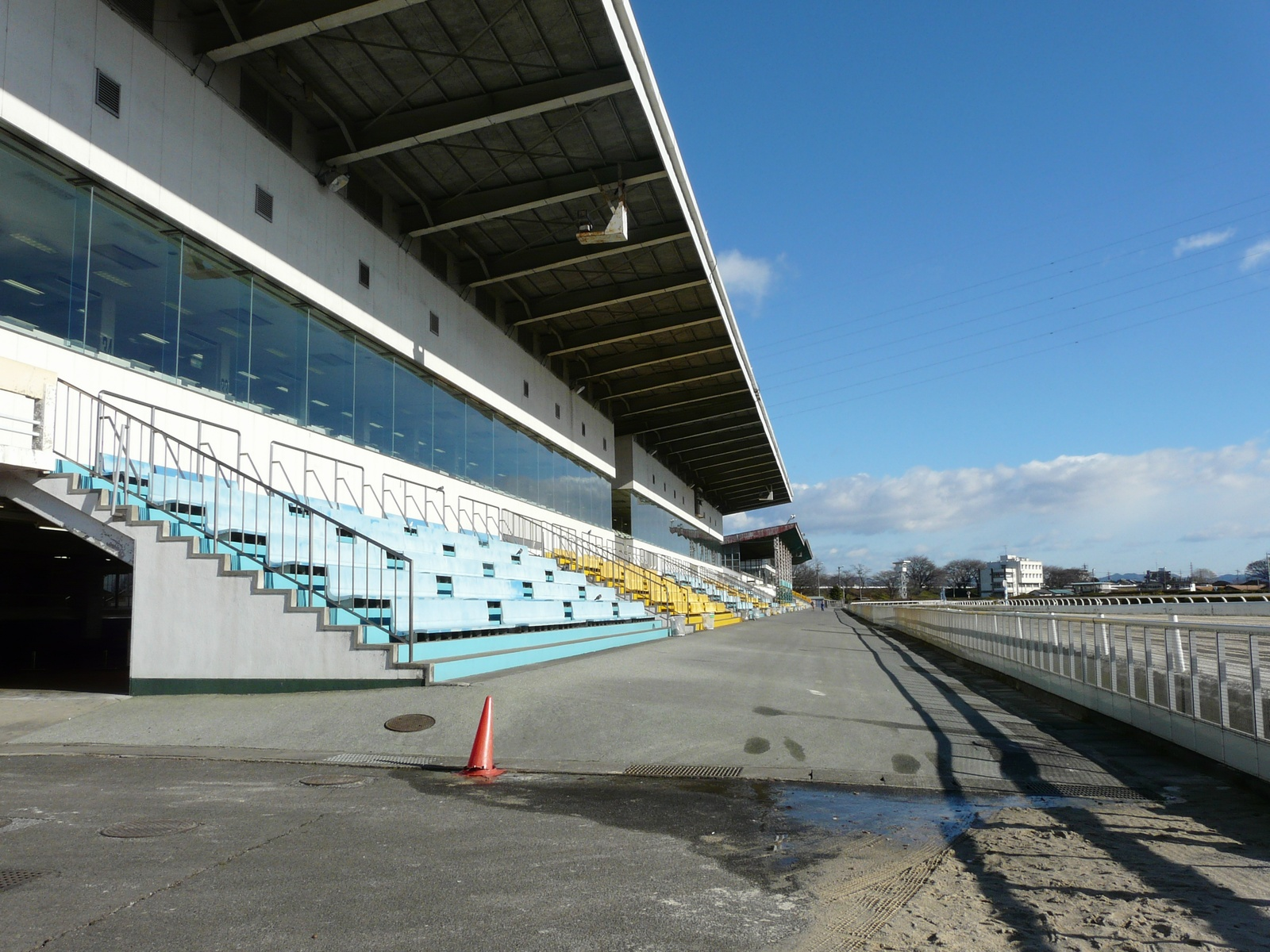
Grandstand of the Kasamatsu Racecourse

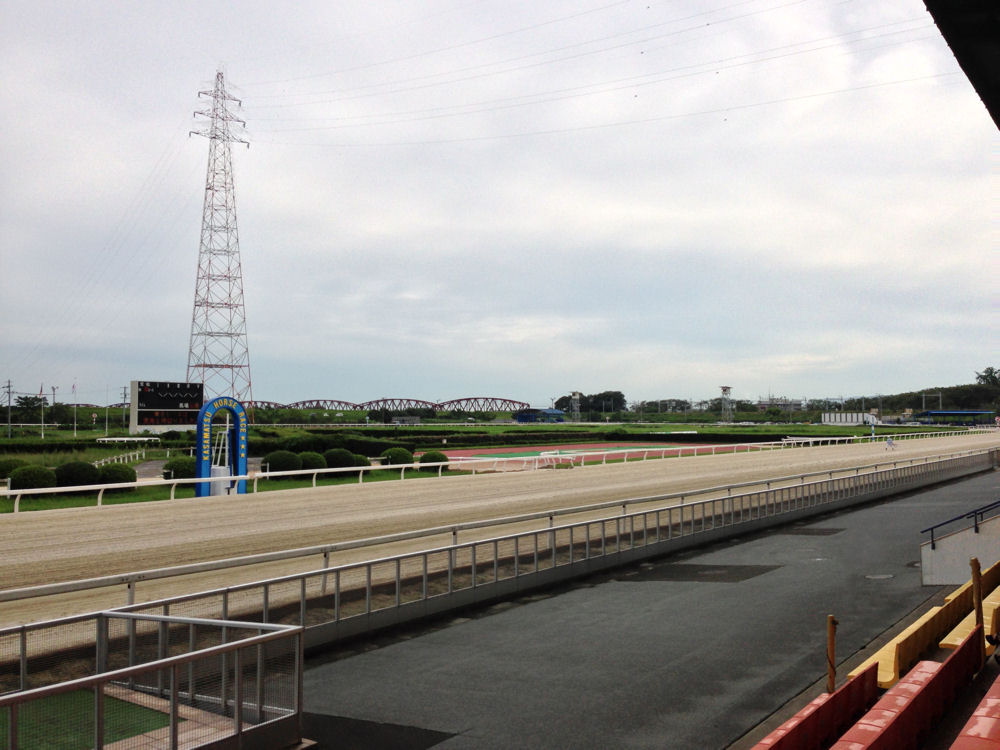
Homestretch of the Kasamatsu Racecourse

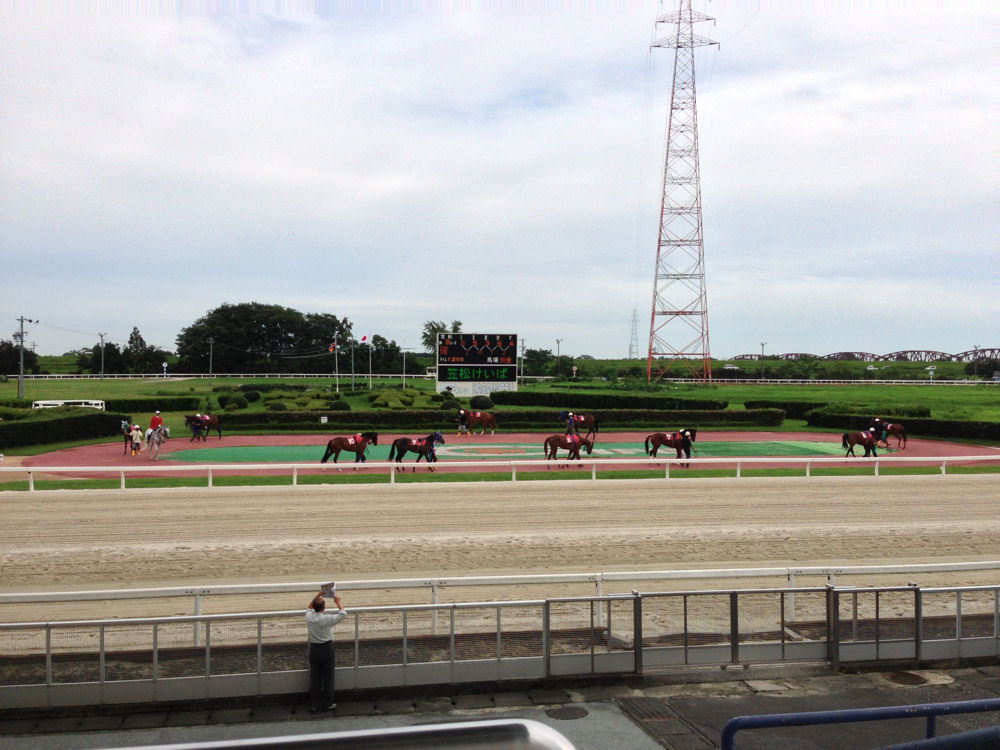
Paddock of the Kasamatsu Racecourse

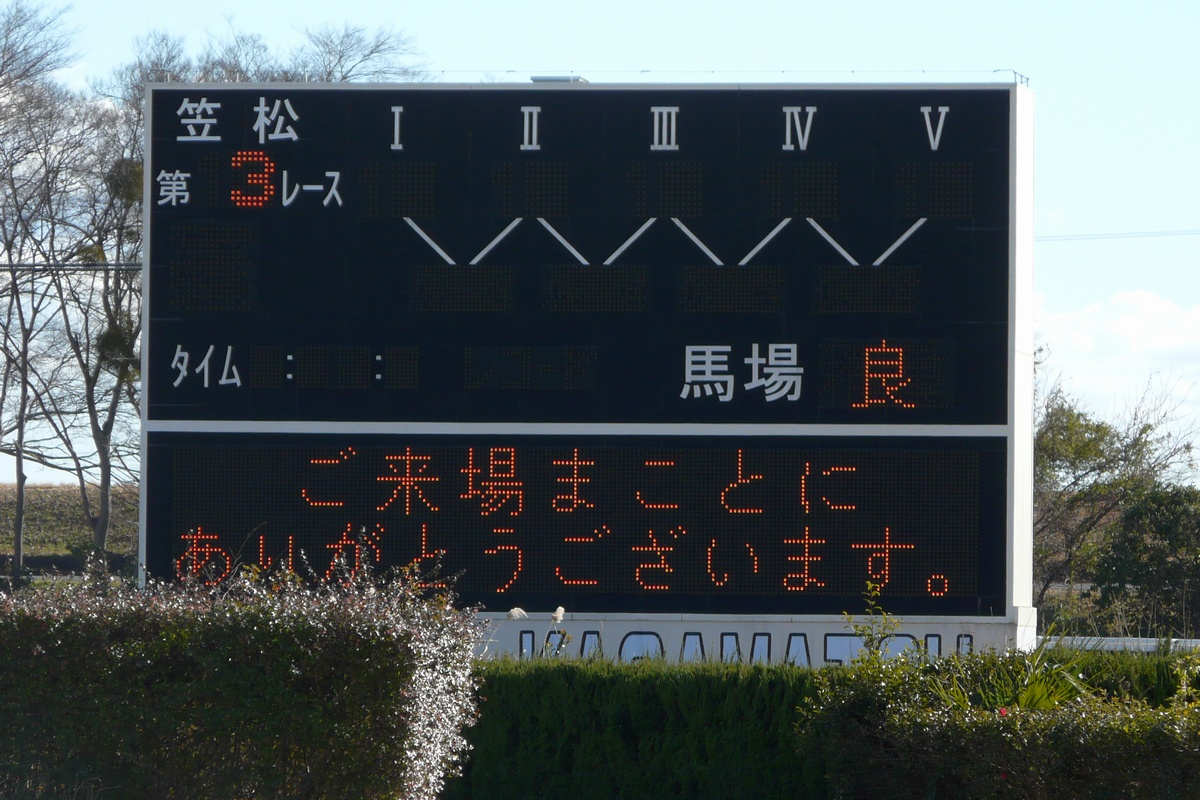
Display screen in Kasamatsu Racecourse

Month	Race Name	Distance	Age & Sex	Latest Winner (Note: Prior year winners are faded.)
Tokai Region Grade 1 (SPI)
February	Blue Ribbon Mile	1,580 meters	Four-year-old & up mares	A Shin Jolt (JPN)
April	Hizannōsui Hai	1,400 meters	Four-year-old & up	Jugemoon (JPN)
May	Oguri Cap Kinen	1,400 meters	Four-year-old & up	K's Reve (JPN)
July	Gifu Seiryū Cup	1,400 meters	Three-year-old	Bellagio Sonic (JPN)
August	Kuroyuri Shō	1,580 meters	Three-year-old & up	Manno Lightning (JPN)
August	Gifu Kin Shō	1,900 meters	Three-year-old	Sanyo Sfida (JPN)
November	Love Michan Kinen	1,580 meters	Two-year-old fillies	Koko Kyunkyun (JPN)
November	Kasamatsu Grand Prix	1,400 meters	Three-year-old & up	Stream (JPN)
December	Raiden Leader Kinen	1,400 meters	Two-year-old	Mimosa no Kisetsu (JPN)
December	Tōkai Gold Cup	2,500 meters	Three-year-old & up	History Maker (JPN)
Tokai Region Grade 2 (SPII)
January	Hakugin Sōha	1,900 meters	Four-year-old & up	Dagr Force (JPN)
March	Junior Glory	1,400 meters	Three-year-old	Mimosa no Kisetsu (JPN)
March	March Cup	1,580 meters	Four-year-old & up	Gustar (JPN)
July	Summer Cup	1,400 meters	Three-year-old & up	Manno Lightning (JPN)
October	Autumn Cup	1,900 meters	Three-year-old & up	Sunrise Hope (JPN)
Tokai Region Grade 3 (SPIII)
February	Gold Junior	1,580 meters	Three-year-old	Reversal Top (JPN)
May	Queen Cup	1,580 meters	Three-year-old fillies	River Street (JPN)
June	Shinryoku Shō	1,400 meters	Three-year-old	Earth Judge (JPN)
June	Nadeshiko Sōha	1,400 meters	Three-year-old & up fillies	Chuwa Spring (JPN)
September	Bloom Cup	1,800 meters	Three-year-old	Cash Blitz (JPN)
October	Tōkai Crown	1,400 meters	Three-year-old & up	A Shin Jolt (JPN)
November	Legend Hunter Kinen	1,900 meters	Three-year-old & up	Gold Gear (JPN)
