= Meitetsu Hashima Line =

Railway line in Aichi Prefecture, Japan

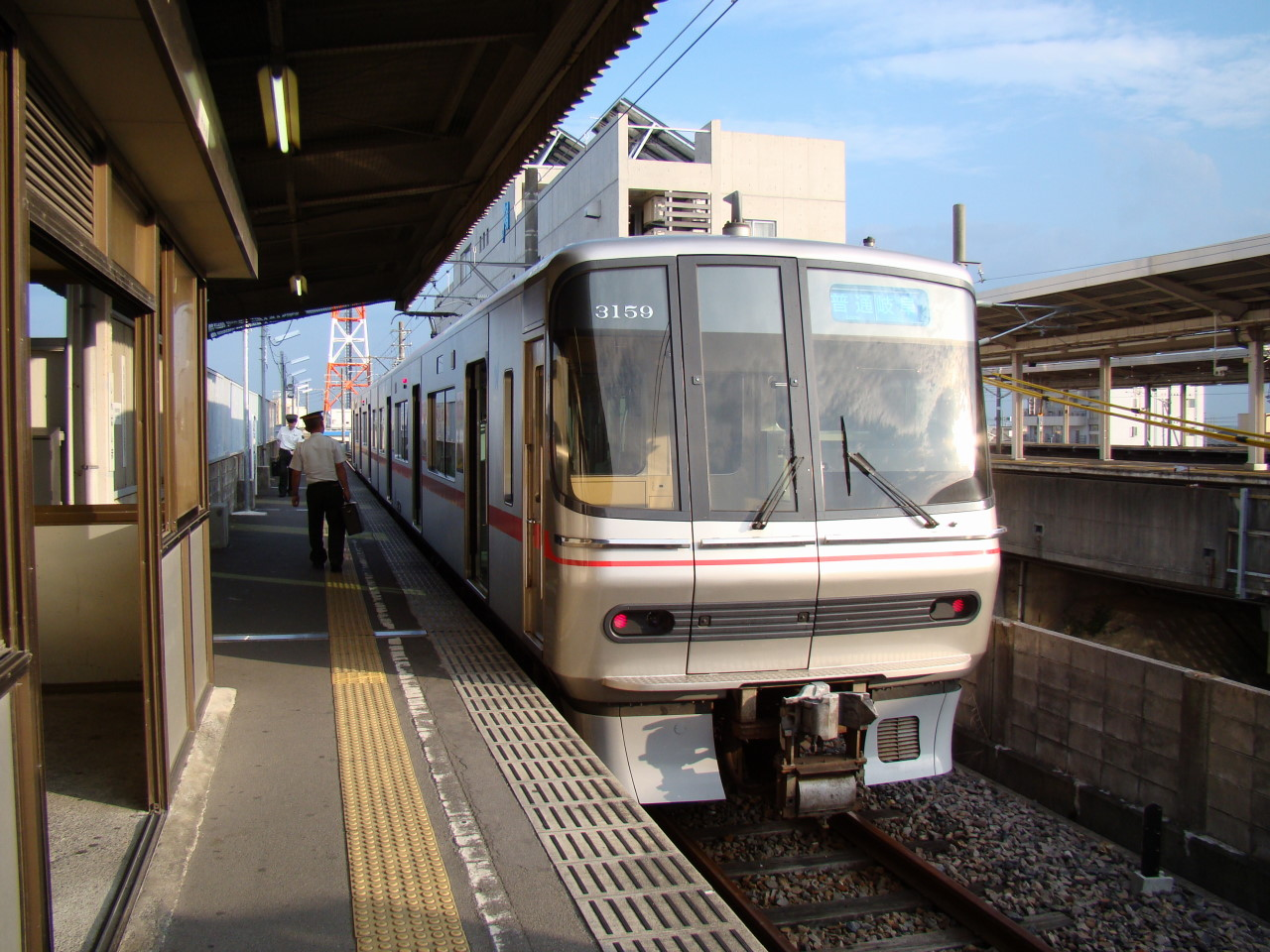
- Shin-Hashima Station

Overview
- Owner: Meitetsu
- Locale: Hashima, Gifu
- Termini: Egira; Shin-Hashima
- Stations: 2

Service
- Type: Commuter rail
- Daily ridership: 808 (2008)

History
- Opened: 1982; 44 years ago

Technical
- Line length: 1.3 km (0.81 mi)
- Track gauge: 1,067 mm (3 ft 6 in)
- Electrification: 1,500 V DC, overhead catenary
- Operating speed: 70 km/h (43 mph)

The Hashima Line (羽島線, Hashima-sen) is a Japanese railway line entirely within Hashima, Gifu Prefecture. It is owned by Nagoya Railroad (Meitetsu), and operated as an extension of the Takehana line, providing a connection to the Tokaido Shinkansen at Gifu-Hashima Station.

== History ==
Proposed in 1962, land acquisition difficulties prevented construction starting until 1978, and the line opened in 1982.

== Stations ==
No.	Name		Distance (km)	Connections
TH08	Egira	江吉良	0.0	Nagoya Railroad: Takehana Line
TH09	Shin Hashima	新羽島	1.3	JR Central: Tōkaidō Shinkansen (Gifu-Hashima)
