= National Association of Racing =

Japanese horse racing authority

The National Association of Racing (Japanese: 地方競馬全国協会 Chiho Keiba Zenkoku Kyokai, or NAR) is the authority for horse races operated by local governments in Japan (Prefectures, cities, towns, villages, or unions of them). NAR itself does not operate horse races.

By contrast, Japan Racing Association is a public company established in Japan under a law to operate Chūō Keiba (中央競馬 Central horse racing) and to manage racecourses, and horse-training facilities in the country.

In Japan, horse races operated by local governments are called chiho keiba (Japanese: 地方競馬).

== Racetracks ==
Here is the list of racetracks holding races operated by local governments (as of July 2019). All are oval flat dirt tracks except Obihiro (ban'ei) and Morioka (dirt outside and turf inside). Only four are left-handed (counter-clockwise), the others are right-handed (clockwise).

Operator	Racetrack (L/R: Left/Right-handed)
Obihiro City	Obihiro Racecourse (Obihiro, Hokkaido) - Ban'ei race
Hokkaido Prefecture	Monbetsu Racecourse (Hidaka, Hokkaido) R
Iwate Prefecture; Morioka City; Oshu city	Morioka Racecourse (Morioka, Iwate) L
Iwate Prefecture; Morioka City; Oshu city	Mizusawa Racecourse (Oshu, Iwate) R
Saitama Prefecture; Saitama City	Urawa Racecourse (Minami-ku, Saitama, Saitama) L
Chiba Prefecture; Funabashi City; Narashino City	Funabashi Racecourse (Funabashi, Chiba) L
Tokyo 23 Ward Cities	Ohi Racecourse (Shinagawa-ku, Tokyo) R
Kanagawa Prefecture; Kawasaki City	Kawasaki Racecourse (Kawasaki-ku, Kawasaki, Kanagawa) L
Ishikawa Prefecture; Kanazawa City	Kanazawa Racecourse (Kanazawa, Ishikawa) R
Gifu Prefecture; Kasamatsu Town; Ginan town	Kasamatsu Racecourse (Kasamatsu, Gifu) R
Aichi Prefecture; Nagoya City	Nagoya Racecourse (Minato-ku, Nagoya, Aichi) R
Hyōgo Prefecture; Amagasaki City; Himeji city	Sonoda Racecourse (Amagasaki, Hyogo) R
Hyōgo Prefecture; Amagasaki City; Himeji city	Himeji Racecourse (Himeji, Hyōgo)R
Kōchi Prefecture; Kōchi City	Kochi Racecourse (Kōchi, Kōchi) R
Saga Prefecture; Tosu City	Saga Racecourse (Tosu, Saga) R

=== Racetracks used to hold prefectural/municipal races ===
The following courses now hold only Japan Racing Association (JRA) races.

- Sapporo Racecourse (Chuo-ku, Sapporo, Hokkaido) - Prefectural races until 2009
- Hakodate Racecourse (Hakodate, Hokkaido) - Prefectural races until 1997
- Chukyo Racecourse (Toyoake, Aichi) - Prefectural/municipal races until 2002
- Niigata Racecourse (Kita-ku, Niigata, Niigata) - Prefectural races until 2002

=== Defunct NAR Racetracks ===
- Haruki Racecourse: Ended racing on March 16, 1974.
- Kimiidera Racecourse: Ended racing on March 28, 1988.
- Nakatsu Racecourse: Ended racing on March 22, 2001.
- Sanjo Racecourse: Ended racing on August 16, 2001.
- Masuda Racecourse: Ended racing on August 16, 2002.
- Ashikaga Racecourse: Ended racing on March 3, 2003.
- Kaminoyama Racecourse: Ended racing on November 11, 2003.
- Takasaki Racecourse: Ended racing on December 31, 2004.
- Utsunomiya Racecourse: Ended racing on March 14, 2005.
- Iwamizawa Racecourse: Ended racing on October 2, 2006.
- Kitami Racecourse: Ended racing on November 27, 2006.
- Asahikawa Racecourse: Ended racing in October 16, 2008.
- Arao Racecourse: Ended racing on December 23, 2011.
- Fukuyama Racecourse: Ended racing on March 24, 2013.

== See also ==
- Japan Racing Association (JRA)
- Japan Bloodhorse Breeders' Association (JBBA)
