= Kawashima, Gifu =

Dissolved municipality in Gifu prefecture, Japan

Map of Kawashima, Gifu

Kawashima (川島町, Kawashima-machi) was a town located in Hashima District, Gifu Prefecture, Japan.

As of 2003, the town had an estimated population of 10,204 and a density of 1,272.32 persons per km^{2}. The total area was 8.02 km^{2}.

On November 1, 2004, Kawashima was merged into the expanded city of Kakamigahara and no longer exists as an independent municipality.
