= Gifu College of Nursing =

Public university in Hashima, Gifu, Japan

Coordinates: 35°18′22.9″N 136°41′10.5″E

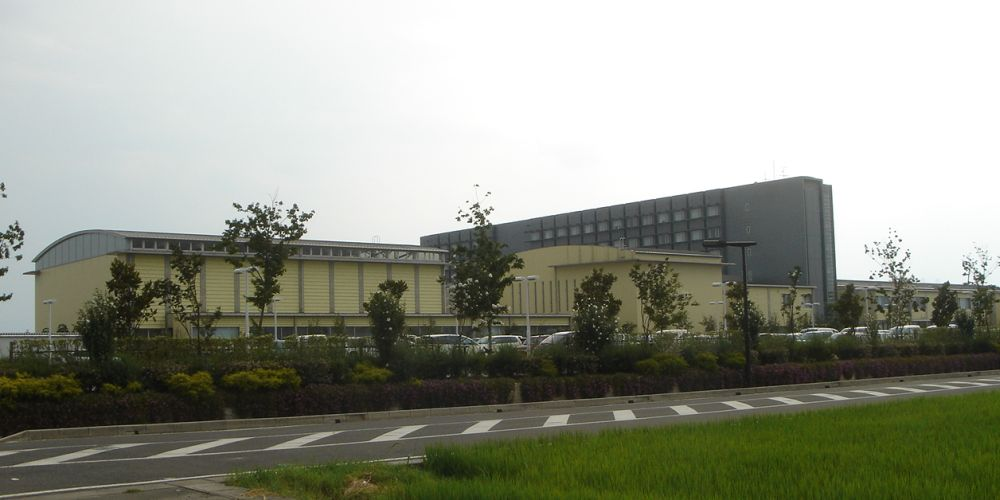
Gifu College of Nursing

Gifu College of Nursing (岐阜県立看護大学, Gifu kenritsu kango daigaku) is a public university at Hashima, Gifu, Japan, established in 2000.
