= Gifu-Hashima Station =

Railway station in Hashima, Gifu prefecture, Japan

Gifu-Hashima Station 岐阜羽島駅
- The north side of Gifu-Hashima Station in June 2026

General information
- Location: 645-1 Fukujuchō Hirakata; Hashima, Gifu; Japan
- Coordinates: 35°18′57″N 136°41′08″E
- Operator: JR Central
- Distance: 396.3 km (246.2 mi) from Tokyo
- Platforms: 2 island platforms
- Tracks: 6

Construction
- Structure type: Elevated

Other information
- Status: Staffed (Midori no Madoguchi)
- Website: Official website (in Japanese)

History
- Opened: 1 October 1964; 62 years ago

Passengers
- FY 2023: 5,641 daily

Services
| Preceding station | JR Central | Following station |
|---|---|---|
| Maibara towards Shin-Ōsaka | Tokaido Shinkansen Hikari Kodama | Nagoya towards Tokyo |
Location
- Location within Gifu Prefecture Location within Japan

Gifu-Hashima Station (Japanese: 岐阜羽島駅, Hepburn: Gifu-Hashima-eki) is a railway station on the Tokaido Shinkansen located in the city of Hashima, Gifu, Japan, operated by Central Japan Railway Company (JR Central). It is the sole Shinkansen station in Gifu Prefecture.

== History ==
The station opened on October 1, 1964. With the privatization and dissolution of Japanese National Railways on April 1, 1987, the station came under the control of JR Central.

== Details ==
Gifu-Hashima Station is served only by the Tokaido Shinkansen, and is located 396.3 kilometres (246.2 miles) from the terminus of the line at Tokyo. Shin-Hashima Station, the terminal of the Meitetsu Hashima Line is located in front of the Shinkansen station and provides railway access to the city of Gifu.

The station has two island platforms serving four tracks, with two additional centre tracks for non-stop passing trains. The station has a Midori no Madoguchi staffed ticket office.

== Surrounding area ==
- Shin-Hashima Station, Hashima Line

== See also ==
- List of railway stations in Japan
