= Kasamatsu, Gifu =

Kasamatsu 笠松町
- Town
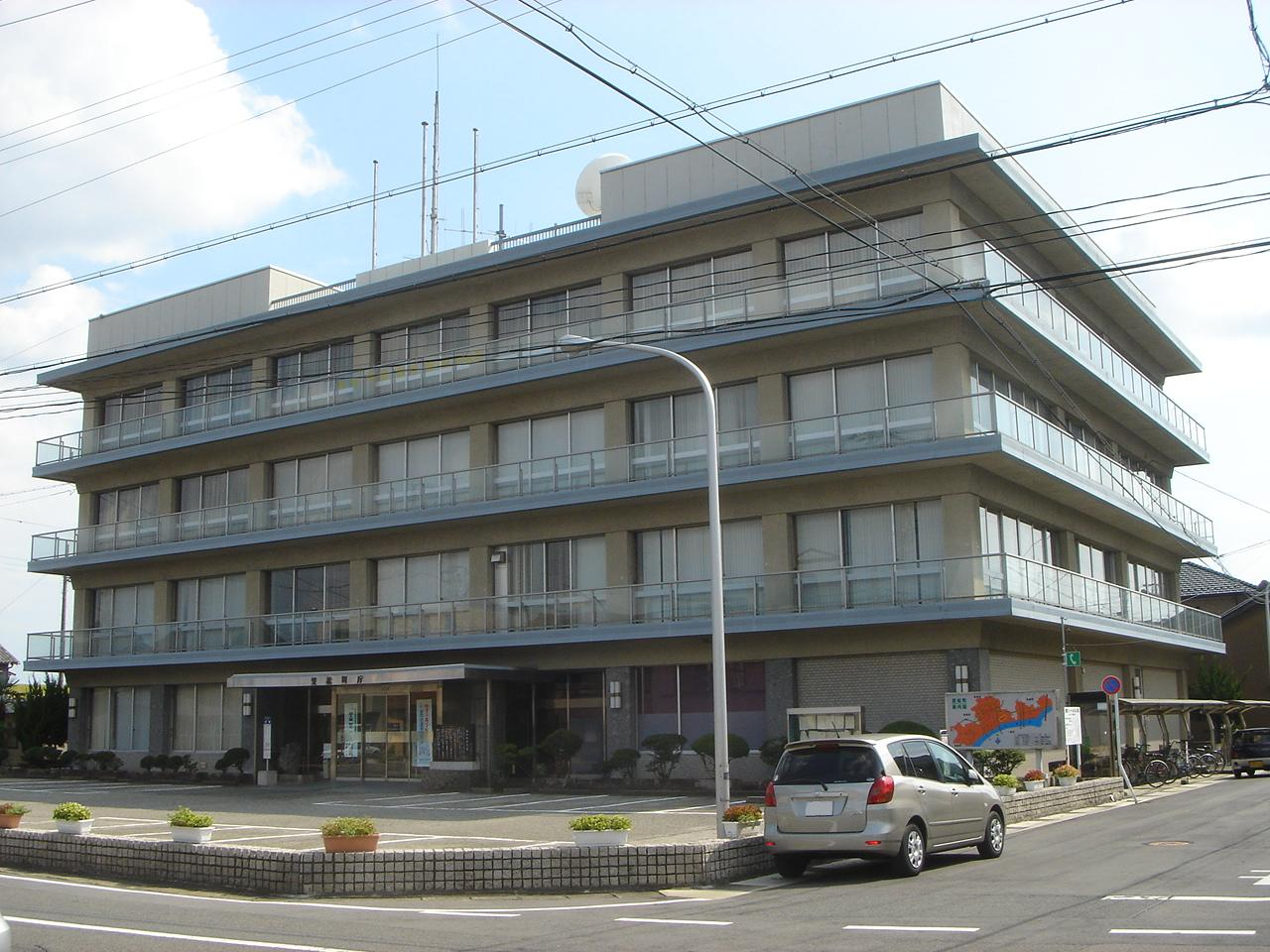
- Kasamatsu Town Hall

- Flag Seal

- Location of Kasamatsu in Gifu Prefecture

- Coordinates: 35°22′1.8″N 136°45′47.6″E
- Country: Japan
- Region: Chūbu
- Prefecture: Gifu
- District: Hashima

Government
  - Mayor: Masaaki Hiroe

Area
  - Total: 10.3 km^{2} (4.0 sq mi)

Population (November 1, 2018)
  - Total: 22,273
  - Density: 2,160/km^{2} (5,600/sq mi)
- Time zone: UTC+9 (Japan Standard Time)
- City symbols
- Tree: Pine
- Flower: Cherry blossom
- Phone number: 058-388-1111
- Address: Tsukasa-machi 1, Kasamatsu-chō, Hashima-gun, Gifu-ken 501-6181
- Website: Official website

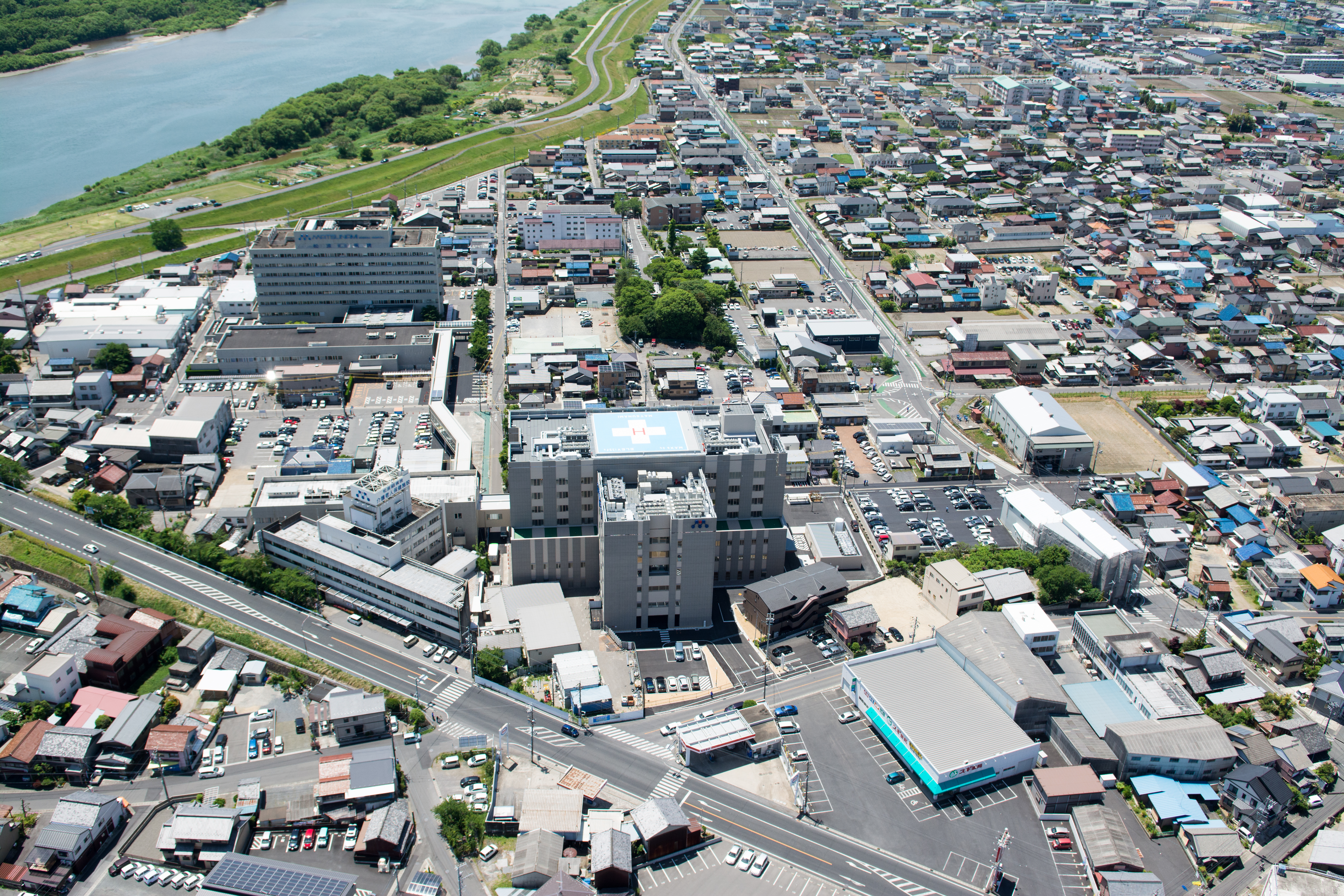
Kasamatsu City in drone view

Kasamatsu (笠松町, Kasamatsu-chō) is a town located in Hashima District, Gifu, Japan. As of 31 October 2018, the town had an estimated population of 22,273 and a population density of 2200 persons per km^{2}, in 8944 households. The total area of the town was 10.30 square kilometres (3.98 sq mi).

== Geography ==
Kasamatsu is located in the Nōbi Plain in southern Gifu Prefecture, bordering on Aichi Prefecture. The Kiso River flows through the town, which is located in marshy flatlands and was often subject to flooding. The town has a climate characterized by hot and humid summers, and mild winters (Köppen climate classification Cfa). The average annual temperature in Kasamatsu is 15.5 °C. The average annual rainfall is 1915 mm with September as the wettest month. The temperatures are highest on average in August, at around 28.0 °C, and lowest in January, at around 4.1 °C.

=== Neighbouring municipalities ===
- Aichi Prefecture
  - Ichinomiya
- Gifu Prefecture
  - Gifu
  - Ginan
  - Hashima
  - Kakamigahara

== Demographics ==
Per Japanese census data, the population of Kasamatsu has remained steady over the past 50 years.

Historical population
Year	Pop.	±%
1970	21,912	—
1980	22,865	+4.3%
1990	22,229	−2.8%
2000	22,319	+0.4%
2010	22,809	+2.2%
2020	22,208	−2.6%

== History ==
The area around Kasamatsu was part of traditional Owari Province until the course of the Kiso River shifted in 1586, after which time it was part of Mino Province. It was an ancient settlement on the important river crossing connecting Nagoya with Gifu. During the Edo period, it was mostly tenryō territory controlled by Tokugawa shogunate through a bugyō. During the post-Meiji restoration cadastral reforms, the area was organised into Haguri District, Gifu Prefecture, which was subsequently transferred to Hashima District, Gifu. The modern town of Kasamatsu was formed on July 1, 1889. In expanded by annexing the neighbouring village of Matsueda on August 1, 1950, and the village of Shimoharugi on April 1, 1955. Plans to merge with the neighbouring city of Gifu were rejected by a referendum in June 2004.

== Economy ==
The mainstay of the local economy is agriculture (rice, vegetables, dairy, poultry), and light industry (computer related products, dairy products, chemicals).

== Education ==
Kasamatsu has three public elementary schools and two public middle schools operated by the town government, and one public high school operated by the Gifu Prefectural Board of Education.

== Facilities ==
Kasamatsu is home to Kasamatsu Racecourse, a regional horse racing course that most notably saw the early careers of Oguri Cap, a horse that became popular in the late 1980s in Japan.

== Transportation ==
=== Railway ===
- Meitetsu - Nagoya Main Line
  - Kasamatsu
- Meitetsu - Takehana Line
  - Kasamatsu - Nishi-Kasamatsu

=== Highway ===
- E41 Tōkai-Hokuriku Expressway
- National Route 22

== In popular culture ==
Kasamatsu is the setting of Umamusume: Cinderella Gray, a manga series featuring an anthropomorphized version of Oguri Cap as its lead. Both the racecourse and the town have collaborated with the series since its release.
