= Kasamatsu (surname) =

Kasamatsu (written: 笠松) is a Japanese surname. Notable people with the surname include:

- Akihiro Kasamatsu (笠松 昭宏, born 1976), Japanese artistic gymnast
- Shigeru Kasamatsu (笠松 茂, born 1947), Japanese artistic gymnast, father of Akihiro
- Shiro Kasamatsu (笠松 紫浪, 1898–1991), Japanese artist
