= Hashima District =

District in Gifu Prefecture, Japan

Location of Hashima District in Gifu Prefecture

Hashima (羽島郡, Hashima-gun) is a district located in Gifu Prefecture, Japan.

As of July 2011, the district has an estimated population of 46,685. The total area is 18.26 km^{2}.

== Towns ==
- Ginan
- Kasamatsu

== Mergers ==
- On November 1, 2004 - the town of Kawashima was merged into the expanded city of Kakamigahara.
- On January 1, 2006 - the town of Yanaizu was merged into the expanded capital city of Gifu Prefecture, Gifu.
