= Kasamatsu Station (Gifu) =

Railway station in Kasamatsu, Gifu Prefecture, Japan

Kasamatsu Station 笠松駅

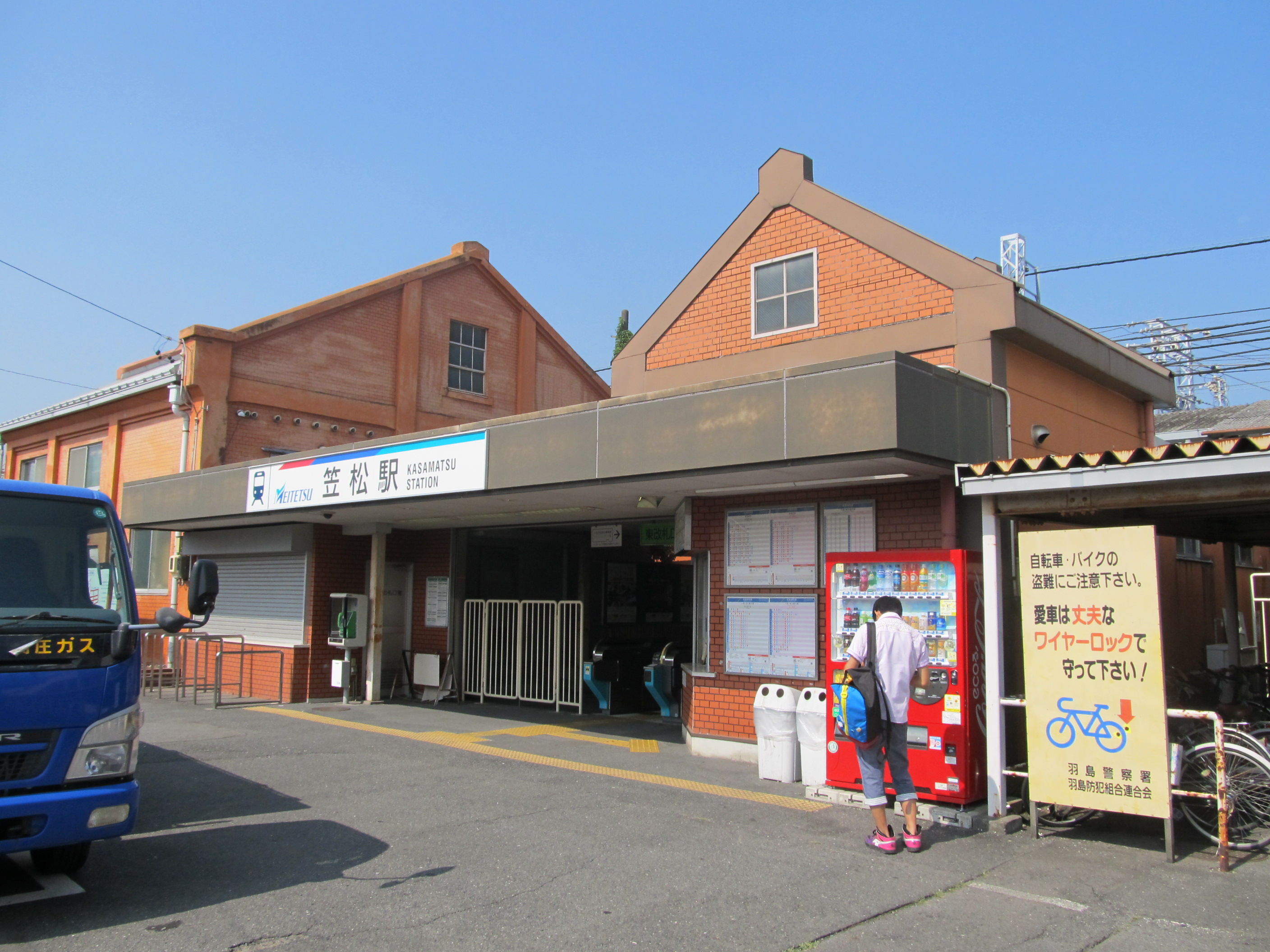
- Kasamatsu Station East Exit, July 2013

General information
- Location: 1 Nishikonchi-machi, Kasamatsu-cho, Hashima-gun, Gifu-ken 501-6037; Japan
- Coordinates: 35.3747°N 136.7645°E
- Operator: Meitetsu
- Lines: ■ Nagoya Main Line; ■ Takehana Line
- Distance: 91.5 km from Toyohashi
- Platforms: 1 island + 1 side platform

Other information
- Status: Staffed
- Station code: NH56
- Website: Official website (in Japanese)

History
- Opened: June 2, 1914; 112 years ago
- Former names: Kasamatsuguchi (to 1916)

Passengers
- FY2015: 3764

Services
Preceding station	Meitetsu	Following station
Meitetsu Ichinomiya towards Toyohashi	Nagoya Main Line Rapid Limited Express Limited Express	Meitetsu Gifu Terminus
Shin-Kisogawa towards Toyohashi	Nagoya Main Line Rapid Express Express	Meitetsu Gifu Terminus
Shin-Kisogawa towards Ina	Nagoya Main Line Semi Express	Meitetsu Gifu Terminus
Kisogawa-zutsumi towards Ina	Nagoya Main Line Local	Ginan towards Meitetsu Gifu
Terminus	Takehana Line	Nishi-Kasamatsu towards Egira
Location
- Location within Gifu Prefecture Location within Japan

Kasamatsu Station (笠松駅, Kasamatsu-eki) is a railway station located in the town of Kasamatsu, Hashima District, Gifu Prefecture, Japan, operated by the private railway operator Meitetsu.

== Lines ==
Kasamatsu Station is a station on the Nagoya Main Line, and is located 91.5 kilometers from the terminus of the line at Toyohashi. It is also a terminal station for the Takehana Line, and is located 10.3 kilometers from the opposing terminus of the line at Egira.

== Station layout ==
track layout

Kasamatsu Station has one ground-level island platform and one ground-level side platform connected by a footbridge. The station is attended.

=== Platforms ===
1	■ Takehana Line	For Takehana and Shin-Hashima
1	■ Nagoya Main Line	For Meitetsu Gifu
2	■ Nagoya Main Line	For Meitetsu Gifu
3	■ Nagoya Main Line	For Meitetsu Nagoya, Toyohashi, and Central Japan International Airport

== History ==
Kasamatsu Station opened on June 2, 1914, as Kasamatsuguchi Station (笠松口駅). It was named Kasamatsu Station on February 1, 1916, but was slightly relocated on October 1 of the same year. It was again relocated on April 29, 1935, and renamed Shin-Kasamatsu Station (新笠松駅). It was relocated to its present location in May 1936 and reverted to the name of Kasamatsu Station.

== Passenger statistics ==
In fiscal 2015, the station was used by an average of 3764 passengers daily (boarding passengers only).

== Surrounding area ==
- Kasamatsu Racecourse
- Gifu Industrial High School

== See also ==
- List of railway stations in Japan
