= Egira Station =

Railway station in Hashima, Gifu Prefecture, Japan

Egira Station 江吉良駅

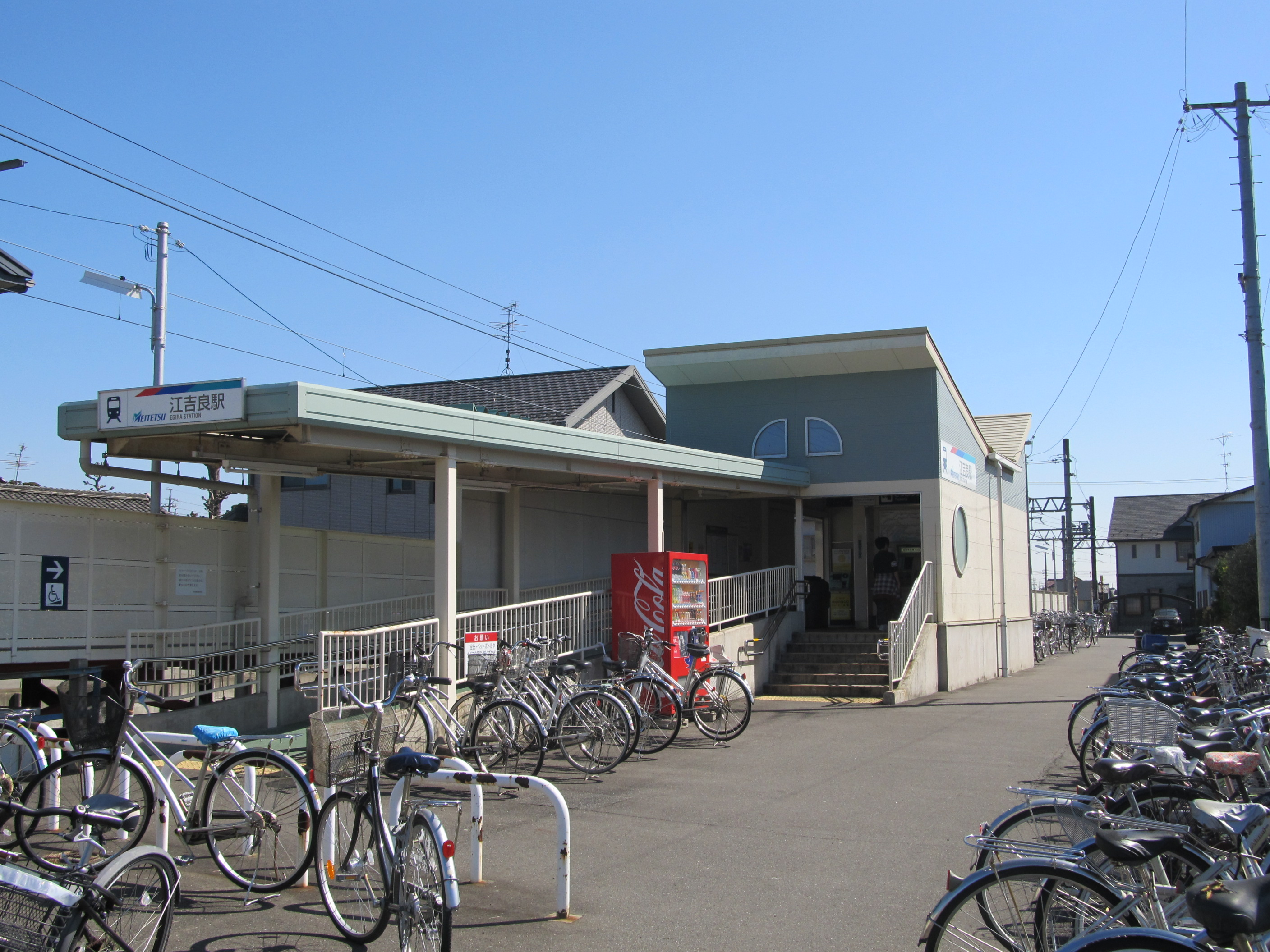
- Egira Station in March 2015

General information
- Location: Egira-cho, Hashima-shi, Gifu-ken 501-6236; Japan
- Coordinates: 35.3156°N 136.6996°E
- Operator: Meitetsu
- Lines: ■ Meitetsu Takehana Line; ■ Meitetsu Hashima Line
- Distance: 10.3 km from Kasamatsu
- Platforms: 1 side platforms

Other information
- Status: Unstaffed
- Station code: TH08
- Website: Official website (in Japanese)

History
- Opened: April 1, 1929; 97 years ago
- Closed: 1943–1982

Passengers
- FY2015: 1,315 daily

Services
Preceding station	Meitetsu	Following station
Hashima-shiyakusho-mae towards Kasamatsu	Takehana Line	through to Hashima Line
through to Takehana Line	Hashima Line	Shin-Hashima Terminus
Location
- Location within Gifu Prefecture Location within Japan

Egira Station (江吉良駅, Egira-eki) is a railway station located in the city of Hashima, Gifu Prefecture, Japan, operated by the private railway operator Meitetsu.

== Lines ==
Egira Station is a station on the Hashima Line and the Takehana Line, and is located 10.3 kilometers from the terminus of the Takehana Line at Kasamatsu.

== Station layout ==
Egira Station has one ground-level side platform serving a single bi-directional track.

■ Hashima Line	For Shin-Hashima
■ Takehana Line	For Kasamatsu and Meitetsu Gifu

== History ==
Egira Station opened on April 1, 1929. The station was closed in 1943 and was not reopened until December 11, 1982.

== Surrounding area ==
- Chuo Elementary School

== See also ==
- List of railway stations in Japan
