= Shin-Hashima Station =

Railway station in Hashima, Gifu Prefecture, Japan

Shin-Hashima Station 新羽島駅

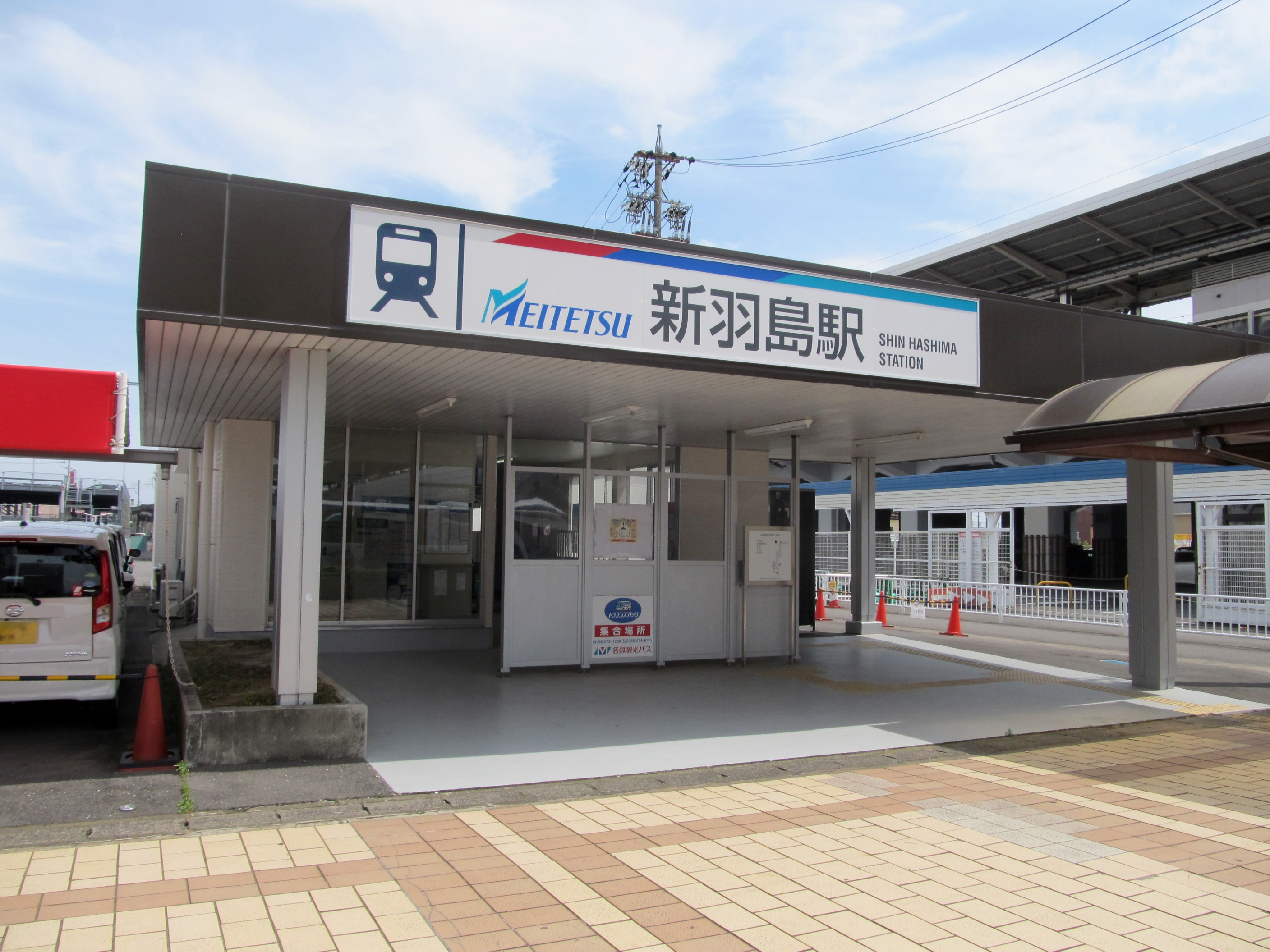
- Shin-Hashima Station in May 2020

General information
- Location: 1-1-1 Funahashi-cho, Miya-kita, Hashima-shi, Gifu-ken 501-6301; Japan
- Coordinates: 35.3156°N 136.6861°E
- Operator: Meitetsu
- Line: ■ Meitetsu Hashima Line
- Distance: 1.3 km from Egira
- Platforms: 1 side platform

Other information
- Status: Unstaffed
- Station code: TH09
- Website: Official website (in Japanese)

History
- Opened: 12 December 1982

Passengers
- FY2016: 2,562 daily

Services
Preceding station	Meitetsu	Following station
Egira Terminus	Hashima Line	Terminus
Location
- Location within Gifu Prefecture Location within Japan

Shin Hashima Station (新羽島駅, Shin Hashima-eki) is a railway station located in the city of Hashima, Gifu Prefecture, Japan, operated by the private railway operator Meitetsu. It is located in front of Gifu-Hashima Station on the Tōkaidō Shinkansen and allows passengers to go from the high speed train network to the Nagoya Railroad (Meitetsu) network and vice versa, but in practice most passengers to or from Gifu choose to enter or leave the high speed train network at Nagoya Station.

== Lines ==
Shin Hashima Station is a station on the Hashima Line, and is located 1.3 kilometers from the terminus of the Hashima Line at Egira and is 11.6 kilometers from Kasamatsu.

== Station layout ==
Shin Hashima Station has one ground-level side platform serving a single bi-directional track. The station is unattended.

=== Platforms ===
■ Hashima Line and Takehana Line	For Kasamatsu and Meitetsu Gifu

== History ==
Shin Hashima Station opened on 12 December 1982.

== Surrounding area ==
- Gifu College of Nursing
- Gifu-Hashima Station, Tokaido Shinkansen

== See also ==
- List of railway stations in Japan
