= Chie =

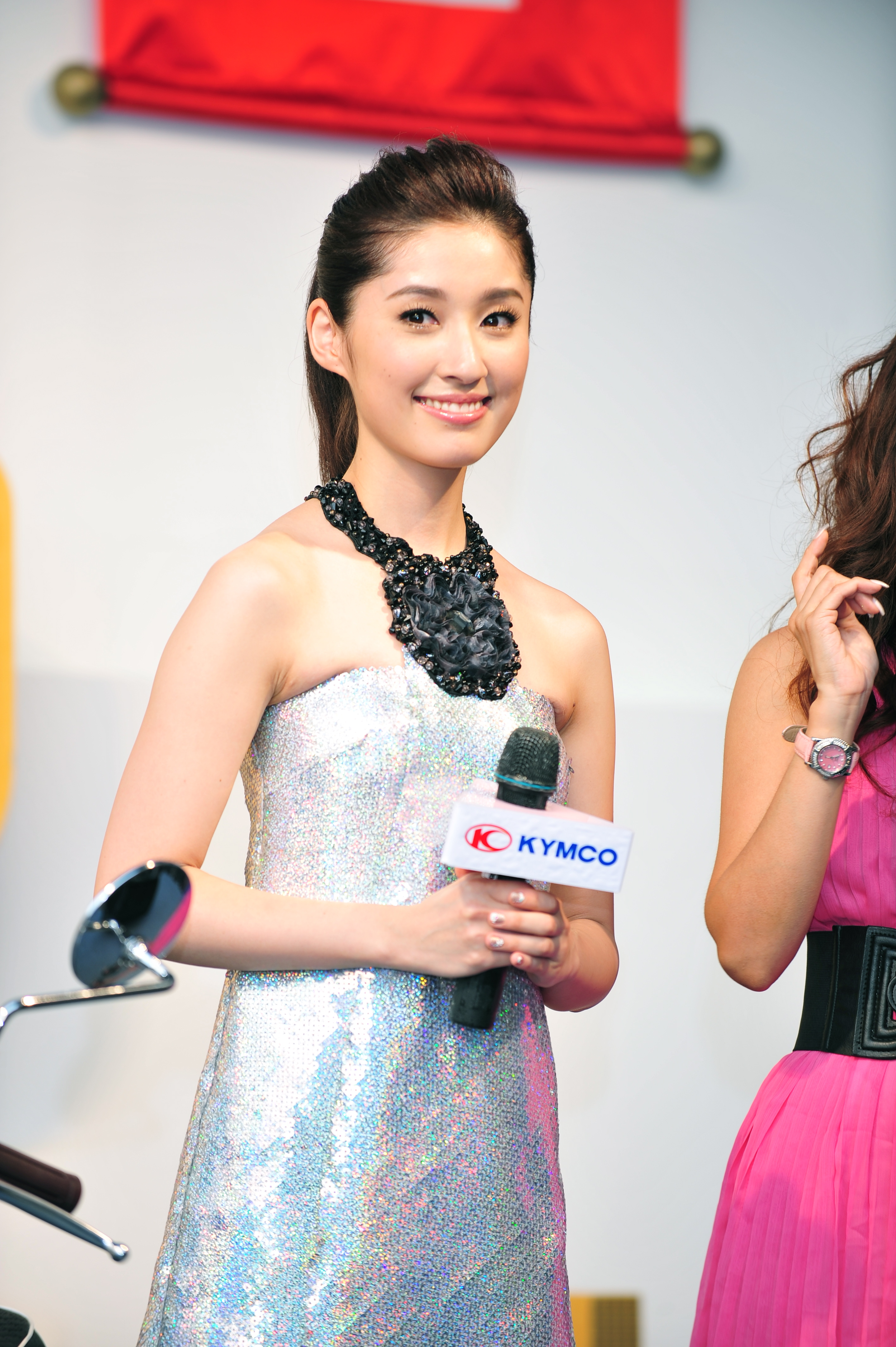
- Chie Tanaka, a Japanese actress and model
- Pronunciation: IPA: tɕi.e (chee-EH)
- Gender: female

Origin
- Origin: Japanese
- Meaning: Many different meanings depending on the kanji used
- Region of origin: Japan

Chie (チエ, ちえ) [tɕi.e] is a Japanese feminine given name.

== Written forms ==
The name Chie can be written multiple ways depending on the kanji used. Some possible ways to write Chie include:

- 智恵, "wisdom, blessing"
- 千絵, "thousand, pictures"
- 千枝, "thousand, branches"
- 千恵, "thousand, blessings"
- 知恵, "wisdom, blessing"
- 智栄, "wisdom, prosperous"
- 茅江, "miscanthus, estuary"
- 致依, "cause, do, reliable"
- 稚慧, "young, wise"
- 地絵, "ground, earth, picture"
- 知映, "knowledge, shine"
- 治映, "govern, shine"
- 千映, "thousand, shine"
- 千栄, "thousand, prosperous"

It can also be written using hiragana or katakana.

== People ==
Those with the name Chie include:

- Chie Akutsu (阿久津 智恵; born 1984), Japanese field hockey player
- Chie Aoki (青木 千絵; born 1981), Japanese sculptor
- Chie Edoojon Kawakami (川上 エドオジョン 智慧; born 1998), Japanese professional footballer
- Chie Fueki (born 1973), Japanese American painter
- Chie Hayakawa (早川 千絵; born 1976), Japanese film director and screenwriter
- Chie Ikeya, historian of Southeast Asia
- Chie Ishii (石井 千恵; born 1983), Japanese retired professional wrestler
- Chie Kajiura (チエ・カジウラ), Japanese singer
- Chie Kanda (神田 千絵; born 1971), Japanese female volleyball player
- Chie Katsuren (勝連 智恵; born 1989), Japanese handball player
- Chie Kimura (木村 千恵; born 1980), Japanese field hockey player
- Chie Kiriyama (桐山 智衣; born 1991), Japanese retired heptathlete
- Chie Kobayashi (小林 千絵; born 1963), Japanese actress and singer
- Chie Kōjiro (神代 知衣; born 1960), Japanese voice actress
- Chie Matsui (born 1960), Japanese artist
- Chie Mukai (向井 千恵; born 1953), Japanese composer and improv musician
- Chie Nakamura (中村 千絵; born 1979), Japanese voice actress
- Chie Nakane (中根 千枝; 1926–2021), Japanese author and anthropologist
- Chie Ozora (大空 ちえ; born 1993), Japanese professional wrestler
- Chie Sakuma (佐久間 千絵; born 1972), Japanese ice hockey player
- Chie Satō (佐藤 智恵; born 1964), Japanese voice actress
- Chie Shinohara (篠原 千絵), Japanese manga artist
- Chie Tanabe (田邊 智恵; born 1971), Japanese stuntwoman
- Chie Tanaka (田中 千絵; born 1981), Japanese model and actress
- Chie Tsuji (辻 知恵; born 1969), Japanese former volleyball player
- Chie Uratani (浦谷 千恵; born 1969), Japanese anime director and an illustrator
- Chieko Utsumi (born 1903), Japanese physical educator
- Chie Uratani (浦谷 千恵; born 1969), Japanese anime director and an illustrator
- Chie Yamayoshi, Los Angeles-based Japanese videogame artist and filmmaker

== Characters ==
- Chie Harada, a character in the anime series My-HiME and My-Otome
- Chie Maruyama, a character in the manga Uzumaki
- Chie Sahara, a character in the tokusatsu series Daitetsujin 17
- Chie Satonaka, a character from the video game Persona 4
- Chie Yuzuki, a character from the manga series Bloom Into You
- Jarinko Chie, Japanese manga series
