= Tey (disambiguation) =

Tey was the consort of Pharaoh Kheperkheprure Ay.

Tey or TEY may refer to:

== People ==
=== Surname ===
- Carlos Neva Tey, Spanish footballer
- Josephine Tey, British mystery writer
- Juli Marial Tey (1853–1929), Spanish politician
- Miriam Tey, Spanish editor, writer and political activist
- Tey Por Yee, Malaysian businessman and venture capitalist
- Tey Seu Bock, Malaysian professional badminton player
- Tey Tsun Hang, Malaysian judge and academic

=== Given name ===
- Queen Tey, queen of Cambodia
- Tey Diana Rebolledo

== Places ==
- The Teys:
  - Great Tey, a village in Essex, England
  - Little Tey, a village in Essex, England
  - Marks Tey, a village in Essex, England
- Tey, Iran, village

== Other ==
- Kabaret Tey, a Polish cabaret
- Tey, an alternative title for the 2012 film Today
- Theatre for Early Years

== See also ==
- Tiye (disambiguation)
- Tay (disambiguation)
