= Tye =

Tye or TYE may refer to:

== People with the name ==
=== Surname ===
- Albert Tye (1883–1917), English footballer
- Andrew Tye (born 1986), Australian cricketer
- Christopher Tye (c. 1505 – c. 1570), English composer and organist
- Colonel Tye (1753–1780), Black Loyalist in the American Revolution
- John Tye (cricketer) (1848–1905), English cricketer
- John Tye (whistleblower) (born c. 1976), American surveillance whistleblower
- Kay M. Tye (born c. 1981), American neuroscientist
- Michael Tye (artist) (born 1960), Australian mosaic artist
- Michael Tye (philosopher) (born 1950), American philosopher
- Will Tye (born 1991), American football player

=== Given name ===
- Tiye or Tye (1398–1338 BC), queen of Egypt
- Tye Warner Bietz (born 1984), Canadian sports shooter
- Tye Fields (born 1975), American boxer
- Tye Harvey (born 1974), American pole vaulter
- Tye Hill (born 1982), American football player
- Tye Kartye (born 2001), Canadian ice hockey player
- Tye McGinn (born 1990), Canadian ice hockey player
- Tye Perdido (born 1988), American soccer player
- Tye Leung Schulze (1887–1972), Chinese-American interpreter
- Tye Sheridan (born 1996), American actor
- Tye Smith (born 1993), American football player
- Tye Tribbett (born 1977), American gospel singer
- Tye Waller (born 1957), American baseball coach
- Tye White (born 1984), American actor
- Tye Kee Yoon (1849–1919), Chinese diplomat

== Places ==
- Tye, Texas, a city in the United States
- Tye, Washington, a ghost town in the US
- Tye, a hamlet on Hayling Island, England
- Tye River, via the Blue Ridge Mountains, Virginia, US
- Tye River (Washington), via the Cascades, US

== See also ==
- Ty (disambiguation)
- Tiye (name)
- Tie (disambiguation)
