= Type system (disambiguation) =

A type system is a system in computer science and computational theory for classifying entities.

Type system or typing system may also refer to any of the following:

== Human physical characteristics ==
- Andre Walker Hair Typing System, a system for classifying human hair created by stylist Andre Walker
- FIA hair typing system, another system for classifying hair
- Skin types, for classifying human skin based on appearance
- Blood type systems, any of numerous systems for classifying blood

== Military ==
- Type system of the Royal Navy, a system for classifying escorts used by the British Royal Navy

== Printing and typing ==
Things relating to printed type and the act of typing out written language:

- Systems for learning and performing touch typing
- Systems having to do with printed type
- Stenography systems, for abbreviated transcription of language

== See also ==
- Type (disambiguation)
- Typology (disambiguation)
- Tying (disambiguation)
- Typing
