= Tie =

Tie has two principal meanings:

- Necktie, a long piece of cloth worn around the neck or shoulders
- Tie (draw), a finish to a competition with identical results, particularly sports

Tie or TIE may also refer to:

== Engineering and technology ==
- Railroad tie, a rectangular support for the rail
- Tensilica Instruction Extension, a verilog-like language that is used to describe the instruction extensions to the Xtensa processor core
- Tie (engineering), a strong component designed to keep two objects closely linked together
- Time Independent Escape Sequence, a modem protocol

=== Enterprises and organizations ===
- TiE (The Indus Entrepreneurs), a Silicon Valley non-profit
- Titanium Metals Corporation, with the stock symbol TIE on the New York Stock Exchange
- Transport Initiatives Edinburgh Ltd., an Edinburgh-based public transport company

== Science ==
- Interpersonal ties, in sociology and psychology
- TIE receptors, specific types of cell surface receptors

== Acronym ==
- Theatre in Education
- Time for Inclusive Education, an LGBT campaign group in Scotland
- Times Interest Earned, a financial ratio

== People ==
- Cathy Tie (born 1996?), Chinese-Canadian bioinformatician and entrepreneur
- Esko Tie (1928–2002), Finnish ice hockey player
- Li Tie (born 1977), Chinese retired footballer and Chinese national head coach
- Lie Tie (director) (1913–1996), Chinese film director
- Lin Tie (1904–1989), Chinese communist revolutionary leader and politician, first Communist Party Chief and second governor of Hebei province
- Tahir Tie Domi (born 1969), Canadian retired National Hockey League player
- Tiê (born 1980), Brazilian singer-songwriter
- Tie Feiyan (born 1992), Chinese politician
- Tie Liu (1933–2024), Chinese writer
- Tie Ning (born 1957), Chinese short story writer and politician
- Tie Sing (19th-century–1918), Chinese-American chef
- Tie Xuan (1366–1402), Chinese general
- Tie Ya Na (born 1979), Chinese table tennis player
- Tie Ying (1916–2009), Chinese politician and major general
- Tie Yinghua (born 1993), Chinese kickboxer
- Wang Tie (born 1957), Chinese former politician

== Other uses ==
- Tie (tennis), synonymous with match, but used for team competitions such as the Davis Cup and Fed Cup.
- Chie, a Japanese name ("Tie" would be the Kunrei-shiki way of writing "Chie")
- Tie (cavity wall), in construction
- Tie (music), a musical notation symbol joining two notes without a break
- Tie (typography), a punctuation and diacritical sign
- TIE fighter (Twin Ion Engine), a starfighter in the Star Wars universe
- Twist tie, a piece of wire embedded in paper or plastic

== See also ==
- Beer tie, a requirement that a British public house buy at least some of its beer from a particular brewery or pub company
- Thai (disambiguation)
- Ti (disambiguation)
- Tye (disambiguation)
- Tying (disambiguation)
