= Lee Bul =

South Korean artist (born 1964)

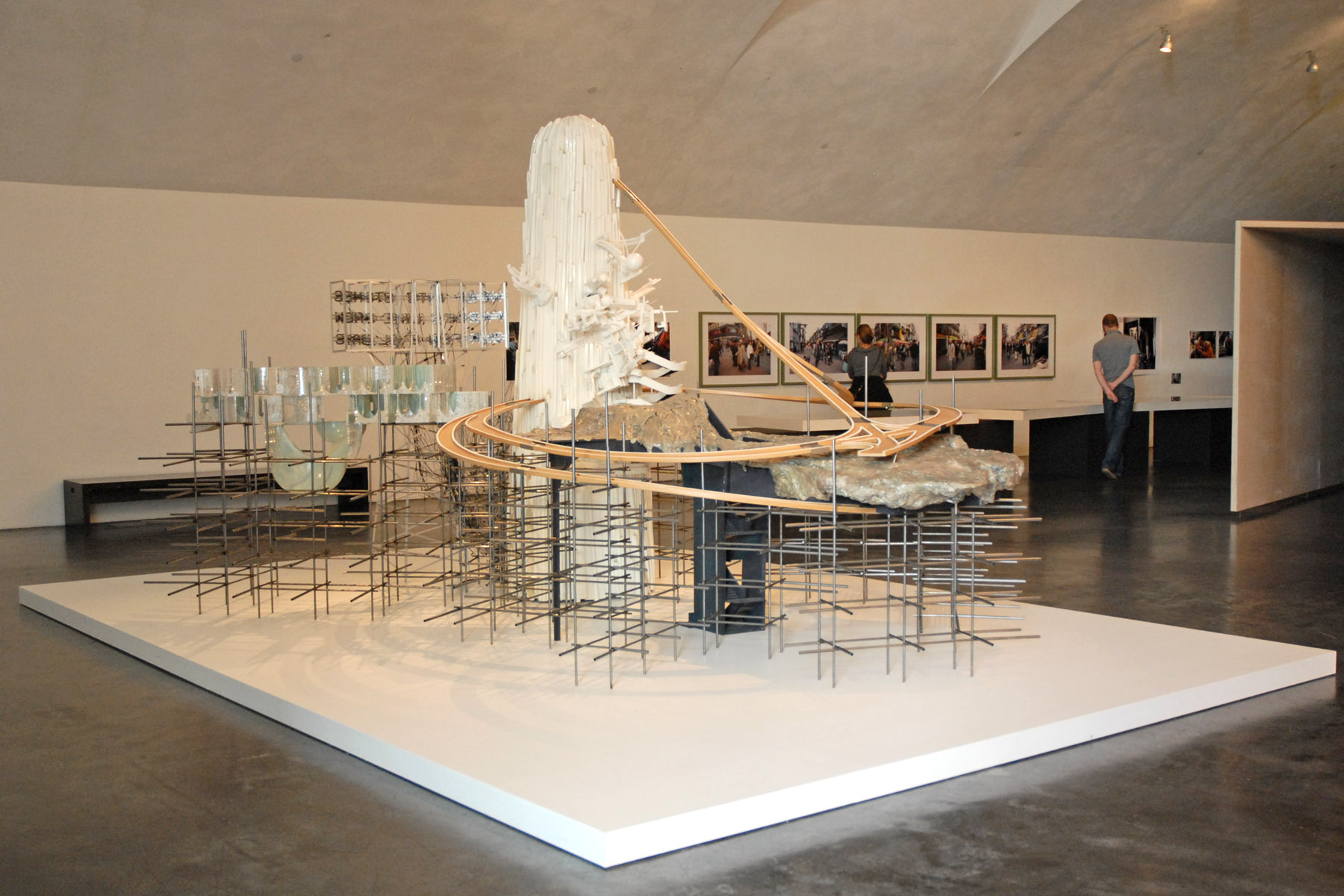
- Mon Grand Recit: Weep into Stones (2005)
- Born: January 24, 1964 (age 62); Yeongju, North Gyeongsang Province, South Korea
- Education: Hongik University
- Website: www.leebul.com

Lee Bul (Korean: 이불; 李昢; born 1964) is a South Korean artist who works in various mediums, including performance, sculpture, installation, architecture, and media art. As curators such as Stephanie Rosenthal and art historians such as Yeon Shim Chung have observed, Lee Bul's artwork is shaped by both her social-political context and her personal experiences. Her works have engaged topics related to architecture, technology, gender, history, and memory. Lee lives and works in Seoul.

== Biography ==
Lee Bul was born on January 24, 1964, in Yeongju, Gyeongsangbuk-do, South Korea. Raised by politically active parents while her country was under the rule of Park Chung Hee, as a child Lee witnessed a dramatically changing society from its margins, where she and her family were repeatedly uprooted and relocated.

Lee's coming of age as an artist in the late 1980s coincided with a significant period in South Korea's development in terms of democracy, modernization, and economic growth. She was initially drawn to working with art because creative fields were one of the few possibilities open to the children of dissidents. The art historian Yeon Shim Chung has argued that Lee's artistic trajectory diverged at an early stage from the oft-travelled artistic routes of her time.

Lee received a B.F.A in sculpture from Hongik University, Seoul in 1987, receiving her artistic training at a time when Minjung Misul— literally “People's Art” — was posing a challenge to the dominance of academic art and minimalism. The year she graduated from art school was also the year South Korea declared itself a democracy and began implementing political and economic reforms. As curator Mami Kataoka writes, “With the country as a whole agonizing over what form their new society should take, it is not difficult to imagine Lee Bul wrestling with all manner of ideas [...] about the form society should take, doubts about and rejection of the military dictatorship, ideas about the reality of the social system, and the uncertain future.” As Lee embarked on her own independent artistic practice, she rejected the overtly socialist realist and folk aesthetics of the Minjung artists while also pivoting sharply away from the cold, hard materials that founded her training in sculpture (namely, wood, stone, and metal).

Her work received its first widespread international recognition with the series Majestic Splendor (1991), which was exhibited at the Museum of Modern Art in 1997 and Harald Szeemann’s Lyon Biennale the following year. In 1999, Szeemann invited Lee to participate in the 48th Venice Biennale, where she received an Honorable Mention award for her contribution to the International Pavilion and her exhibition at the Korean Pavilion.

== Practice ==
=== Early work and performance ===
Lee Bul's work of the late 1980s and early 1990s used performance to explore the relationship between the body and society in South Korea at that time. In search of a way to express her state of being on the one hand, and the state of society on the other, she created forcefully visceral works and guerrilla-like actions, a number of which critically explored gender politics and the patriarchal order in Korean society. Her early performances combined aspects of craft with the contingencies of circumstance and time.

==== Sorry for Suffering—You think I'm a puppy on a picnic? ====
The performance work Sorry for Suffering was carried out over the course of 12 consecutive days in 1990. Lee began her public intervention at Gimpo Airport, wearing a soft sculpture resembling a body turned inside-out. Over the following days, she continued the performance in various locations, with the viewers' responses becoming an integral part of her performance. Lee roamed through public spaces in the multi-limbed soft sculpture, enacting performative interventions at sites such as airport gates, shrines, university campuses, and imperial palaces. The art historian Ayoung Kim describes the work as "an attempt to expand the borders of artistic practice by escaping the traditional ways in which sculptures have occupied space, as well as by infusing theatrical elements into her work, such as satire, symbolism, and temporality.” The subtitle of this work You think I'm a puppy on a picnic? is quoted from the poem To Be Born Again (1981) by Korean feminist poet Choi Seung-ja.

==== Abortion (1989) ====
Over the course of a two-hour long performance at the Dongsoong Art Center in Seoul, Lee hung upside down from a rock-climbing harness recounting the experience of an abortion interspersed with poetry, a parody of Christ on the cross, and references to pop songs. Exploring an extremely taboo subject in South Korea, the structure of Lee's performance “obscures the distinction between the private and the public, the personal and the political, the real and the contrived.” Abortion did not have a pre-determined ending and finished when audience members could no longer bear to continue watching the artist writhe in physical pain. Abortion in South Korea was officially decriminalised on January 1, 2021.

==== Cravings ====
Cravings is an example of Lee's performative work with soft sculptures. Lee created full-body suits constructed of sewn fabric padded with fiberfill to exaggerate and distort the anatomy of the wearer. Intricately adorned with cheap sequins and beads, each piece featured exaggerated, grotesque appendages resembling arms, legs, tentacles and tails. The artwork includes performers engaging in slow improvised movements, amplified by concealed microphones highlighting their labored breathing. Cravings questions the stability of concepts like the real and artificial, illustrating how technology blurs these boundaries and transforms human expressions into alienating experiences.

=== Majestic Splendor ===
A work that has been exhibited globally across multiple iterations, Lee first presented Majestic Splendor in 1991 in Seoul. The installation features real dead fish decorated with sequins, beads, and other small, sparkly items, which are placed in plastic bags and pinned to the wall of the gallery in a grid pattern. Over time, the work emits a putrid odor. In 1997, during the Projects exhibition at the Museum of Modern Art in New York, Majestic Splendor was removed from the exhibition due to its stench.

As the art historian Yeon Shim Chung notes, Majestic Splendor operates on multiple levels, simultaneously “implicating the individual body and the politics of Korean society.” Fish are a popular motif in both religious and secular Korean art traditions. In Majestic Splendor, Lee incorporates the sea bream, known as domi in Korean, which is associated with a renowned Korean folktale. According to the tale, the legendary heroine committed suicide to protect her virtue, rather than succumb to the advances of a lecherous king. Chung writes that Lee Bul's work “acknowledges this popular connotation, but her work overturns such emphasis on female chastity as absurd and disturbing.”

A prolific material of Korea's textile industry, sequins additionally have strong personal and social connotations for the artist. Lee's mother, who was barred from traditional employment because of her political activities, worked from home decorating bags and other accessories, which surrounded the artist throughout her childhood. The work makes broader allusions to the notion of gendered labor. As Chung writes, “Signifying female vanity and fantasy, they [the sequins] also attest to the countless women who toiled in the textile industry making sequined bags and purses in the 1970s [...] the glittering materials adorning Lee Bul's fish directly invoke myriad issues of gender and class, particularly relating to the complex power dynamics that exist between female producers and female consumers.”

=== Monument series ===
Between 1996 and 1999, Lee completed three mixed media installations that incorporate photographs of the artist into large scale inflatable forms. In these participatory works, viewers could inflate the outsized balloon monument via a network of tubing and foot pumps. One of these works, entitled I Need You (Monument) (1996), blows up to a 39-foot balloon that reveals the artist herself as “a kind of punk-geisha-goddess amalgamation of stereotypical images of Asian women.” While a monument is typically made to withstand the test of time, Lee's monument is soft, vulnerable, and ephemeral.

As the art historian Michaël Amy writes, “Lee aptly examines the exotic, oriental ideal as she believes it to be construed by the Western male—his initial desire to be seduced quickly replaced by the urge to conquer and possess.”

=== Cyborg/Anagram ===
In the mid-1990s, Lee Bul began her Cyborg series, moving away from performance-led works and returning to primarily three-dimensional sculpture. The works were first exhibited at the Artsonje Center in Seoul, Korea in 1998. These robotic, sexualized silicone figures reference the long history of figuration of human form, from classical sculpture of ancient Greece and Rome to contemporary representation in manga and cinema. Their fragmented, suspended forms merge biological and mechanical parts, questioning notions of perfection and integrity. The use of white invokes classical and heroic archetypes and grants the sculptures a virtuous character. As the curator Stephanie Rosenthal writes, “each work in this series is in some way incomplete—their missing heads or limbs suggest that these ‘perfect’ figures might still be in the process of transformation.”

Lee's late 1990s work, including the Monster and Anagram series, reflects biotechnological fears with amorphous, textured forms evoking horror and sci-fi themes like decay, artifice, and the transcendence of flesh. According to Rosenthal, these series function as “doppelgängers” to Lee's Cyborgs and complete them, as a monster can only be considered monstrous in relation to something that embodies the notion of perfectibility like the cyborg. This series of biomorphic sculptures and drawings depict hybrid forms that are part machine, plant, and animal. The Anagram series takes its name from the English term for changing the order of letters in a word to make a new word, an operation that parallels the cyborgs’ reconfiguration of body parts. Through her Cyborg, and Anagram works, Lee Bul investigates the instability of human identity, the allure and dread of technological advancement, and the continuous quest for perfection beyond natural limitations. In Lee's practice, cyborgs and monsters function as powerfully ambivalent metaphors; “ciphers of resistance against the traditional limitations of gender, feminism, race, science and politics.”

=== Live Forever ===
Live Forever is a multimedia installation first exhibited in 2001. The work features futuristic spaceship-like karaoke capsules that, according to Wenny Teo, evoke the streamlined aesthetics of Stanley Kubrick’s 2001: A Space Odyssey and create an intimate, isolated environment for the participant. The white pods are made of fiberglass and the interior is equipped with acoustic foam, leather upholstery, an LCD monitor, a microphone, and headphones. Visitors are invited to enter the capsules one by one, where they can sing karaoke songs in solitude. The work intends to create an ambivalent experience of sensory and psychological displacement.

In addition to the karaoke pods, Live Forever consisted of a new video work that was shot at the Tonga Room, a Tiki-themed lounge in the historic Fairmont Hotel in San Francisco. The venerable hotel bar includes an artificial lagoon, simulated rain from sprinklers, and serves traditional Polynesian cocktails. Like karaoke, it evokes a sense of nostalgia and kitsch. Lee's video from the Tonga Room, which was produced with the assistance of the San Francisco Art Institute, is projected both outside and inside the pod, while the lyrics of the song selected by the visitor are superimposed on the video. As the film scholar Akira Mizuta Lippit writes, “Live Forever is linked to themes of nostalgia and the human desire for authentic experiences in a culture increasingly dominated by virtual realities.” For the visitor inside the pod wearing the headphones, Live Forever is a solitary experience – only they can hear their singing, which turns into a heavily distorted feedback loop. As the curator Clara Kim notes, for those inside the pod, “the future and the past cross over.”

=== Mon grand récit ===
Initiated in 2005, the series Mon grand récit is a diverse collection of immersive installations, drawings, and sculptures that explore literary, philosophical, and architectural meditations on utopia and dystopia, state fiction, and social reality. The title Mon grand récit, which translates as “my grand narrative,” reflects Lee's engagement with Jean-Francois Lyotard's critique of the overarching narratives of modernity. By prefixing "mon” or ”my,” Lee emphasizes a personal connection to history, inviting viewers to reconsider societal constructs and their implications for the future. These large-scale installations chronicle the dreamworlds and catastrophes of utopian desire using materials like glass, acrylic, polyurethane, steel and other metals, LED lights, chains, and cables.

Central to the series is a work entitled Weep into stones..., where luminous limestone formations, influenced by futuristic architectural visions, are juxtaposed with suspended grids and scaled-down replicas of iconic structures such as Vladimir Tatlin’s Monument to the Third International. The works included under the umbrella of Mon grand récit broadly explore how utopian aspirations surface in architectural forms. Lee mixes in other fragmented references in these works—some are fictions, while others are private memories and imaginings. Lacking an overarching temporal structure, these different elements become detached from historical time and collide with each other. As the curator Jonathan Watkins writes, “This is [...] a world out of joint, fragmented and fractured. It suggests possibilities in a modernist scheme of things, a paradigm that overarches our 20th century, only to undermine them.”

Mon grand récit articulates a critical dialogue between past visions of progress and contemporary uncertainties, resonating with themes of transience and metamorphosis across cultural and historical landscapes. The series tends to avoid famous events, choosing instead to approach turning points from oblique angles, through concrete yet somehow marginal or secondary figures or events. Some of the works from the series Aubade (2007), whose design recalls water and radio towers built by the Russian engineer and architect Vladimir Shukhov, include neon signs that spell out various terms related to utopian theories and modernization. The terms are all in Esperanto, the language developed in the 1880s by Polish linguist Ludoviko Zamenhof with the aim of achieving world peace through a universal language.

In several other works associated with Mon grand récit, Lee incorporates reflective surfaces to impart a sense of instability. Bunker (M. Bakhtin) (2007/2012) comprises a roughly hewn mountain that is often installed on a highly glossy black surface, resembling an island adrift on a reflective sea. Viewers can enter the work's cave-like interior through a large-fissure. Bunker (M. Bakhtin) references Yi Gu, the last scion of the Joseon Dynasty, who was called back to Korea from a promising architectural career in New York by Park Chung-hee to rally popular support for his rule. As Mami Kataoka writes, “By entering the crack in the black rock, one can experience a space where memory and reality intermingle, where sounds of places associated with Yi Gu and the sounds of visitor's footsteps melt into each other.” Although Mon grand récit seems to mark a shift in Lee Bul's practice away from the body and towards architecture, landscape, and the history of modernity, Lippit argues that “Lee's turn to history is less a turn away from her earlier focus on bodies, than the endless mourning of the bodies that form and unform her work.”

=== Perdu ===
Beginning in 2016, the series Perdu continues Lee's exploration of themes such as utopia, dystopia, and the human condition. The series draws inspiration from Lee's preparatory drawings for the Cyborg sculptures, evident in the fusion of organic shapes with hybrid, humanoid forms.

The works are characterized by their intricate amalgamation of organic and industrial materials. Lee employs materials like mother-of-pearl, lacquer, wood, and acrylic paint—meticulously crafting each piece to evoke both fragility and resilience. The series' title, Perdu, French for "lost," alludes to the elusive nature of perfection and the continuous search for an unattainable ideal.

== Awards and honors ==
Lee Bul is the winner of the 9th Ruth Baumgarte Art Prize. In 2022, she received an Honorary Doctorate of Fine Arts from The School of the Art Institute of Chicago. She was awarded the Ho-Am Prize for the Arts in 2019, the Ordre des Arts et des Lettres from the French Ministry of Culture in 2016, and the Noon Award at the 10th Gwangju Biennale in 2014.

In 1998, Lee was selected as one of six shortlisted artists, including Huang Yong Ping, William Kentridge, Pipilotti Rist, Lorna Simpson, and the winner, Douglas Gordon, for the Hugo Boss Prize.

== Exhibitions ==
Lee has had solo exhibitions worldwide, including Live Forever which toured the New Museum of Contemporary Art in New York and The Power Plant in Toronto. She was selected as a finalist for the 1998 Hugo Boss Prize by the Guggenheim Museum, New York.

Other museums that have presented solo exhibitions of her work include the Vancouver Art Gallery; Palais de Tokyo, Paris; Ikon Gallery, Birmingham; Grand Duke Jean Museum of Modern Art (MUDAM), Luxembourg; Fondation Cartier, Paris; Museum of Contemporary Art, Sydney; MAC, Musée d'Art Contemporain, Marseille; Le Consortium; Fabric Workshop and Museum, Philadelphia; and Kunsthalle Bern, Switzerland.

Her two-person exhibition at the Museum of Modern Art, New York, titled Projects 57, Bul Lee, Matsui Chie was held in 1997. Lee and Matsui Chie were presented as avant-garde female artists who were using installation art to challenge social norms.

In March 2010, the Hara Museum ARC unveiled a permanent installation by Lee Bul entitled A Fragmentary Anatomy of Every Setting Sun. In February 2012, Tokyo's Mori Art Museum mounted a mid-career survey exhibition, the artist’s largest exhibition to date.

The Southbank Centre's newly reopened Hayward Gallery hosted a survey of Lee's artists work beginning at the end of May 2018, her first in London; which explores the artist's extensive investigation into the body and its relationship to architectural space. Occupying the entire gallery, this exhibition includes documentation of early performances, sculptural works from the iconic Cyborg and Anagram series and recent immersive installations, as well as a selection of the artist's studio drawings. A modified version of this exhibition was subsequently mounted at Martin-Gropius-Bau, Berlin, in September of 2018.

In November 2020, an exhibition of the artist's work opened at St. Petersburg's Manege Central Exhibition Hall. Titled Lee Bul: Utopia Saved, the exhibition “marks a first-time encounter between Lee Bul's works and those by artists of the Russian avant-garde that influenced them.”

In November 2023, the Metropolitan Museum of Art (The Met), New York, announced the selection of Lee Bul for its Fifth Avenue façade commission, her first major project in the United States since her 2002 solo exhibition at the New Museum. Titled The Genesis Facade Commission: Lee Bul, Long Tail Halo, the four sculptures comprising the commission were unveiled on September 12, 2024, and remains on view until May 27, 2025.

== Solo Exhibitions ==
2025:

- Lee Bul: After 1998 at Leeum Museum of Art; traveled to M+ Museum, Hong Kong, 2026

2024:

- Long Tail Halo, Metropolitan Museum of Art
- Lee Bul: Prints, BB&M, Seoul

2023:

- Lee Bul: Prints, STPI - Creative Workshop & Gallery
- Solo exhibition at the Sara Hildén Art Museum in Tampere, Finland, Sara Hilden Art Museum
- Lee Bul, BB&M, Seoul
- Lee Bul, Ely Place
- Lee Bul, Gothenburg Museum of Art

2022

- Lee Bul, Thaddaeus Ropac, Paris

2021

- Lee Bul: New and Selected Works, BB&M, Seoul
- Lee Bul: Beginning, Seoul Museum of Art
- Recombinance, Lehmann Maupin, New York

2020

- Utopia Saved, The Manege Central Exhibition Hall, St. Petersburg, Russia

2019

- Interlude: Perdu, Lehmann Maupin, New York
- Lee Bul: City of the Sun, SCAD Museum of Art, Savannah, Georgia

2018

- Lee Bul: Crash, Gropius Bau, Berlin
- Lee Bul: Crashing, Hayward Gallery, London

2017

- After Bruno Taut, Thaddaeus Ropac, London
- Lee Bul, Lehmann Maupin, New York

2016

- Connect 1: Still Acts, Art Sonje Center, Seoul

2015

- Lee Bul, Vancouver Art Gallery
- Lee Bul: Aubade III, Palais de Tokyo, Paris
- Lee Bul, PKM Gallery, Seoul
- Lee Bul, Espai d'Art Contemporani de Castelló, Spain
- Lee Bul: Into Lattice Sun, Swarovski Kristallwelten, Wattens, Austria
- Lee Bul, Musée d'art Moderne et Contemporain de Saint-Etienne Métropole, France

2014

- MMCA Hyundai Motor Series 2014: Lee Bul, National Museum of Modern and Contemporary Art, Seoul
- Lee Bul, Korean Cultural Centre UK, London
- Lee Bul, Ikon Gallery, Birmingham, UK
- Lee Bul, Lehmann Maupin, New York

2013

- Lee Bul, Musée d’Art Moderne Grand-Duc Jean, Luxembourg
- Pure Invisible Sun, Thaddaeus Ropac, Paris
- Lee Bul: Inaugural Hong Kong Exhibition, Lehmann Maupin, Hong Kong

2012

- Lee Bul, Art Sonje Center, Seoul
- Lee Bul: From Me, Belongs to You Only, Mori Art Museum, Tokyo

2010

- Lee Bul, PKM Trinity Gallery, Seoul
- Lee Bul, Lehmann Maupin, New York

2009

- Drawings, Thaddaeus Ropac, Paris

2008

- Lee Bul, PKM Trinity Gallery, Seoul
- Lee Bul, Lehmann Maupin, New York

2007

- Lee Bul: On Every New Shadow, Fondation Cartier pour l’art contemporain, Paris
- Lee Bul, Thaddaeus Ropac, Salzburg
- Lee Bul, PKM Gallery, Seoul
- Lee Bul: Aseptia, Domus Artium 02, Salamanca, Spain

2005

- Lee Bul -S2-, SCAI The Bathhouse, Tokyo
- Lee Bul: 2005 International Artist in Residence, Govett-Brewster Art Gallery, New Plymouth, New Zealand

2004

- Lee Bul, Museum of Contemporary Art, Sydney
- Lee Bul, PKM Gallery, Seoul
- Lee Bul: Monsters, Deitch Projects, New York

2003

- Lee Bul: Live Forever, Henry Art Gallery, Seattle
- Lee Bul: The Monster Show, Centre for Contemporary Arts, Glasgow
- Lee Bul: Theatrum Orbis Terrarum, Ohara Museum of Art, Kurashiki, Japan
- Lee Bul: Theatrum Orbis Terrarum, Japan Foundation, Tokyo
- Lee Bul: Live Forever, Scottsdale Museum of Contemporary Art, Arizona

2002

- Lee Bul: Live Forever, The Power Plant, Toronto
- Lee Bul: The Monster Show, Musées d’art Contemporain de Marseille
- Lee Bul: Live Forever, Jean Paul Slusser Gallery, Ann Arbor, Michigan
- Lee Bul: Live Forever, New Museum of Contemporary Art, New York
- Lee Bul: The Monster Show, Consortium Museum, Dijon, France
- Lee Bul Drawings: Cultural Body, PKM Gallery, Seoul
- Lee Bul, Rodin Gallery, Samsung Museum of Art, Seoul
- Lee Bul: Live Forever, Orange County Museum of Art, Newport Beach, California

2001

- Lee Bul: Live Forever, Fabric Workshop and Museum, Philadelphia
- Lee Bul: Cyborgs, SCAI the Bathhouse, Tokyo
- Lee Bul: Live Forever, San Francisco Art Institute
- Lee Bul: The Divine Shell, BAWAG Foundation, Vienna

2000

- Lee Bul: Monster + Cyborg, Fukuoka Asian Art Museum, Japan
- Futuristic Baroque, Kukje Gallery, Seoul

1999

- Lee Bul, Noh Sang-Kyoon, Korean Pavilion, The 48th Venice Biennale
- Lee Bul, Kunsthalle Bern, Switzerland

1998

- Lee Bul, Art Sonje Center, Seoul

1997

- Projects, Museum of Modern Art, New York

1994

- Unforgiven, A Space, Toronto

1988

- Step by Step, Th-that's, IL Gallery, Seoul
