= Tiye (name) =

U33 i i Z4 B1
Tiye
in hieroglyphs
Era: New Kingdom
(1550–1069 BC)

Tiye, also spelled Tiy, Tiyi, Tiya was an ancient Egyptian name; according to Aldred, the pet name for Nefertari. Its notable bearers were:

- Queen Tiye, wife of Amenhotep III, mother of Akhenaten and possible sister of Ay (18th dynasty)
- Queen Tey, wife of Ay, wet nurse of Nefertiti, possibly mother of Mutbenret (18th dynasty)
- Queen Tiye-Mereniset, wife of Setnakht, mother of Ramesses III (20th dynasty)
- Queen Tiye, wife of Ramesses III, against whom she was involved in a harem conspiracy to put her son Pentawere on the throne. (20th dynasty)

"Tiy" is also an online moniker used by Finn Bruce, the founder of Chucklefish.

== See also ==
- Ti (disambiguation)
- Ty (disambiguation)
- Tie (disambiguation)
- Tey (disambiguation)
- Tiya, a town in southern Ethiopia
- Tiyi, a mountain in Nagaland
