= Toshio Takai =

Toshio Takai (Japanese: 高井 としを, romanized: Takai Toshio; October 26, 1902 – November 9, 1983) was a Japanese labor activist.

== Biography ==
Toshio Hori (Japanese: 堀 としを) was born in 1902, in a remote area of Gifu prefecture. Her father worked making charcoal, and her childhood was marked by poverty and tragedy, including the deaths of two of her siblings. At a young age, around 12 years old, she began working in a textile mill.

After World War I, she became aware of the labor movement when she was given a Sōdōmei flyer during a strike at her mill. Her first major activism in this area was as a leader in a strike at Tokyo Muslin, as part of the Labor and Politics Association.

Through her union activity, she met the writer and researcher Wakizo Hosoi in 1921. With her intimate knowledge of work in the textile mills, she became instrumental to the process of writing his 1925 book The Sad History of Female Textile Workers. They lived together as a common-law couple but never married, and he died prematurely in 1925, shortly after the book's publication. Despite the book's success and her role in its production, she was eventually cut off from receiving royalties by the publisher, who refused to recognize her relationship with Hosoi.

Due to her activism and relationship with Hosoi, she was barred from working in the textile mills. She also faced harassment by police.

Later, she married a fellow union activist, Shintaro Takai, with whom she had several children. He also died relatively young, in 1946.

After her second husband's death, she began working as a day laborer. In 1951, she returned to labor leadership as founder and chairperson of the Itami Local Free Labor Union in Hyogo prefecture.

In 1980, Toshio Takai published a memoir of her life and experiences as an activist, My Own Sad History of Female Textile Workers. She died in 1983, at age 81.
