= Gifu City Women's College =

Public college in Gifu, Japan

Coordinates: 35°25′33.2″N 136°43′0.7″E

Gifu City Women's College 岐阜市立女子短期大学
- Gifu Shiritsu Joshi Tanki Daigaku
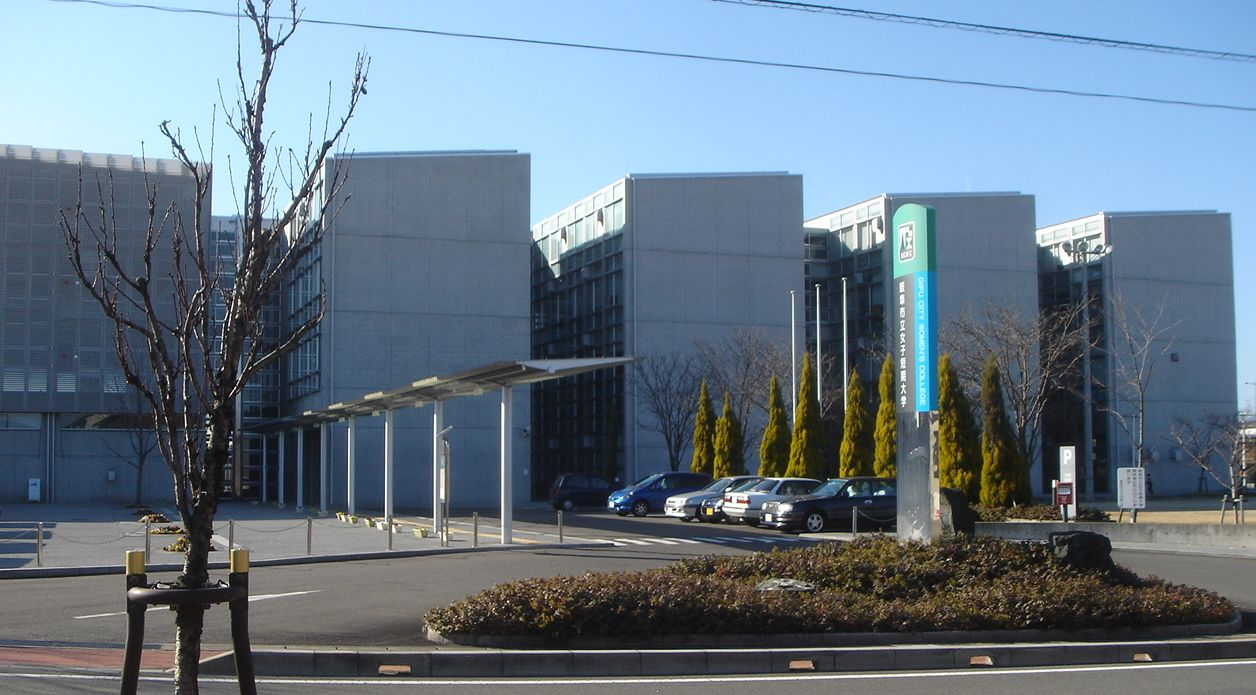
- Type: Public university
- Established: 1950
- Location: Gifu, Gifu Prefecture, Japan
- Website: Official website

Gifu City Women's College (岐阜市立女子短期大学, Gifu Shiritsu Joshi Tanki Daigaku) is a public college in the city of Gifu, Gifu Prefecture, Japan, founded in 1946. Its abbreviated name is Gijotan (岐女短).

== Academic departments ==
- Department of English
- Department of International Culture Studies
- Department of Food and Nutrition
- Department of Apparel and Interior Design
