= Gifu Pharmaceutical University =

University in Gifu, Japan

Coordinates: 35°27′56.2″N 136°44′1.8″E

Gifu Pharmaceutical University 岐阜薬科大学
- Gifu Yakka Daigaku
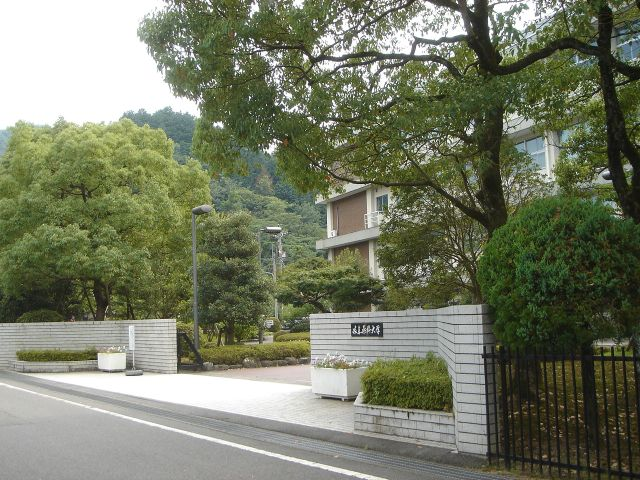
- Type: Public university
- Established: 1949
- Location: Gifu, Gifu Prefecture, Japan
- Website: Gifu Pharmaceutical University

Gifu Pharmaceutical University (岐阜薬科大学, Gifu Yakka Daigaku) is a municipal university located in the city of Gifu, Gifu Prefecture, Japan. The school's predecessor was founded in 1932 and chartered as a university in 1949.

== International exchanges ==
The university has added to Gifu's sister city exchanges by becoming a sister university or setting up an academic exchange program with three of Gifu's sister cities: Hangzhou (China), Cincinnati (United States) and Florence (Italy). It has had a sister university agreement with Zhejiang University in Hangzhou since 1984. Since then, it has set up exchange programs with the pharmacy programs at the University of Cincinnati in Ohio and the University of Florence, which were started in 1991 and 1993, respectively. It also has had a relationship with China Pharmaceutical University since 1982.
