= Gifu Prefecture =

Prefecture of Japan

Coordinates: 35°29′N 136°54′E

Gifu Prefecture 岐阜県
- Prefecture

Japanese transcription(s)
  - Japanese: 岐阜県
  - Rōmaji: Gifu-ken
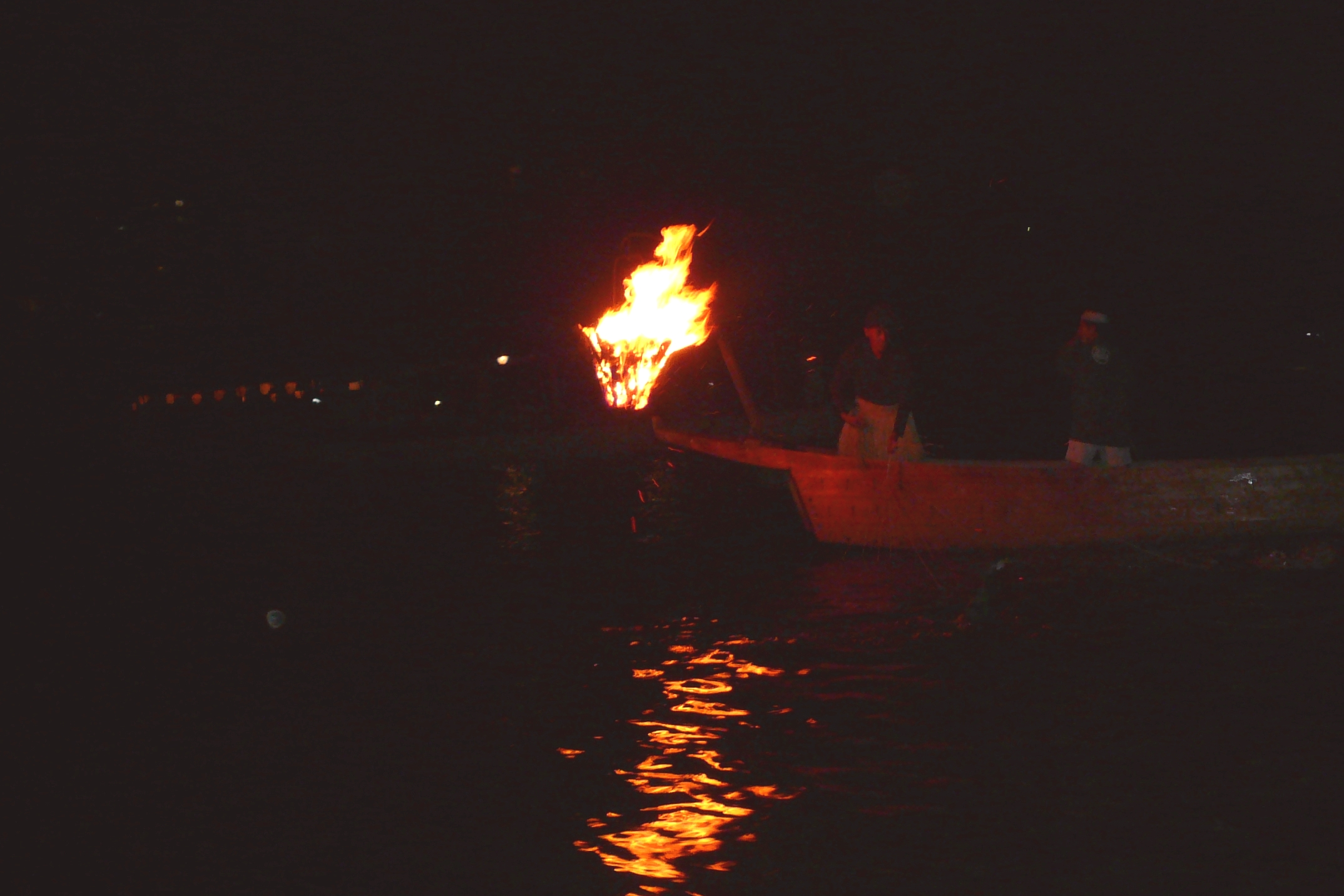
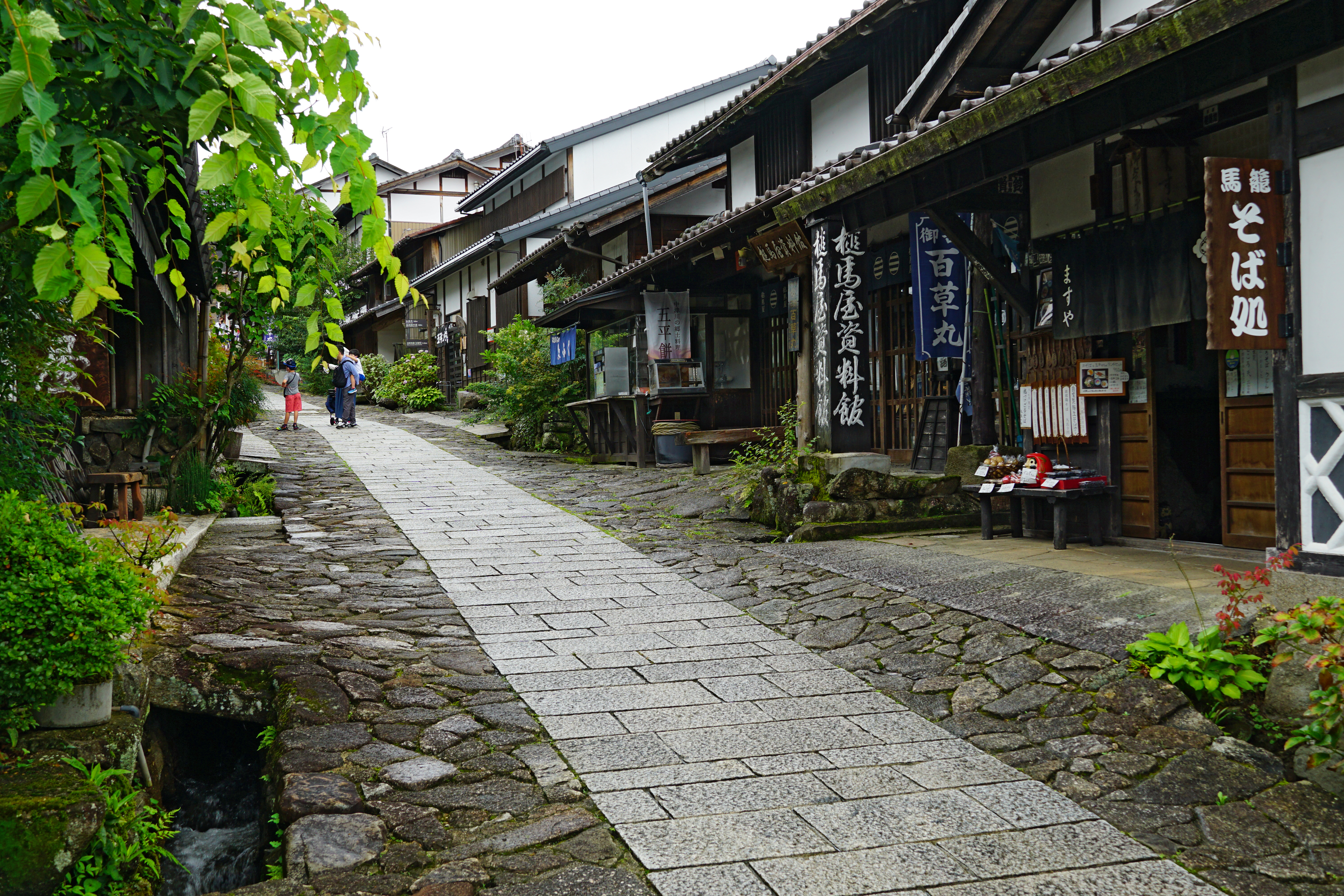
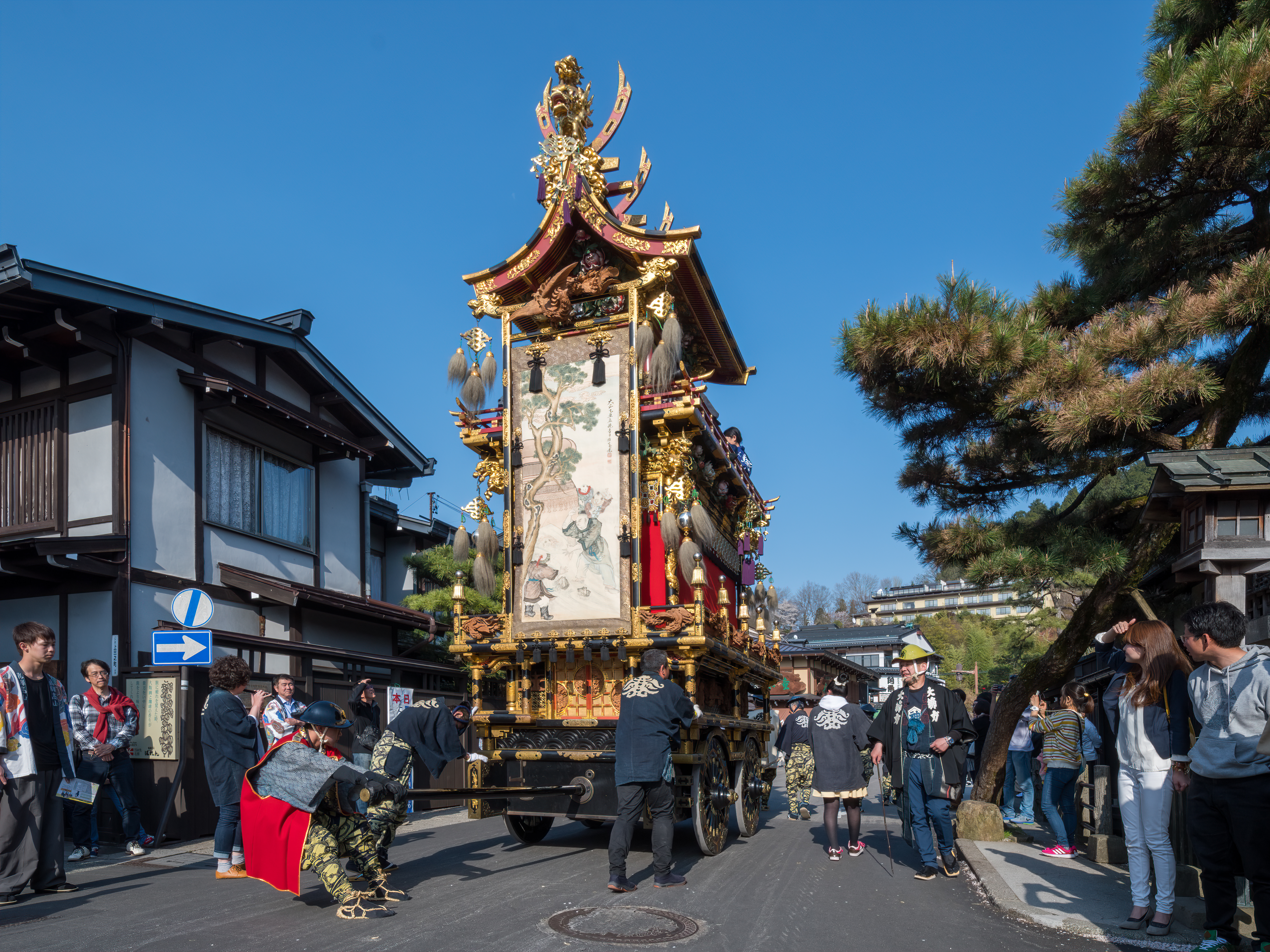
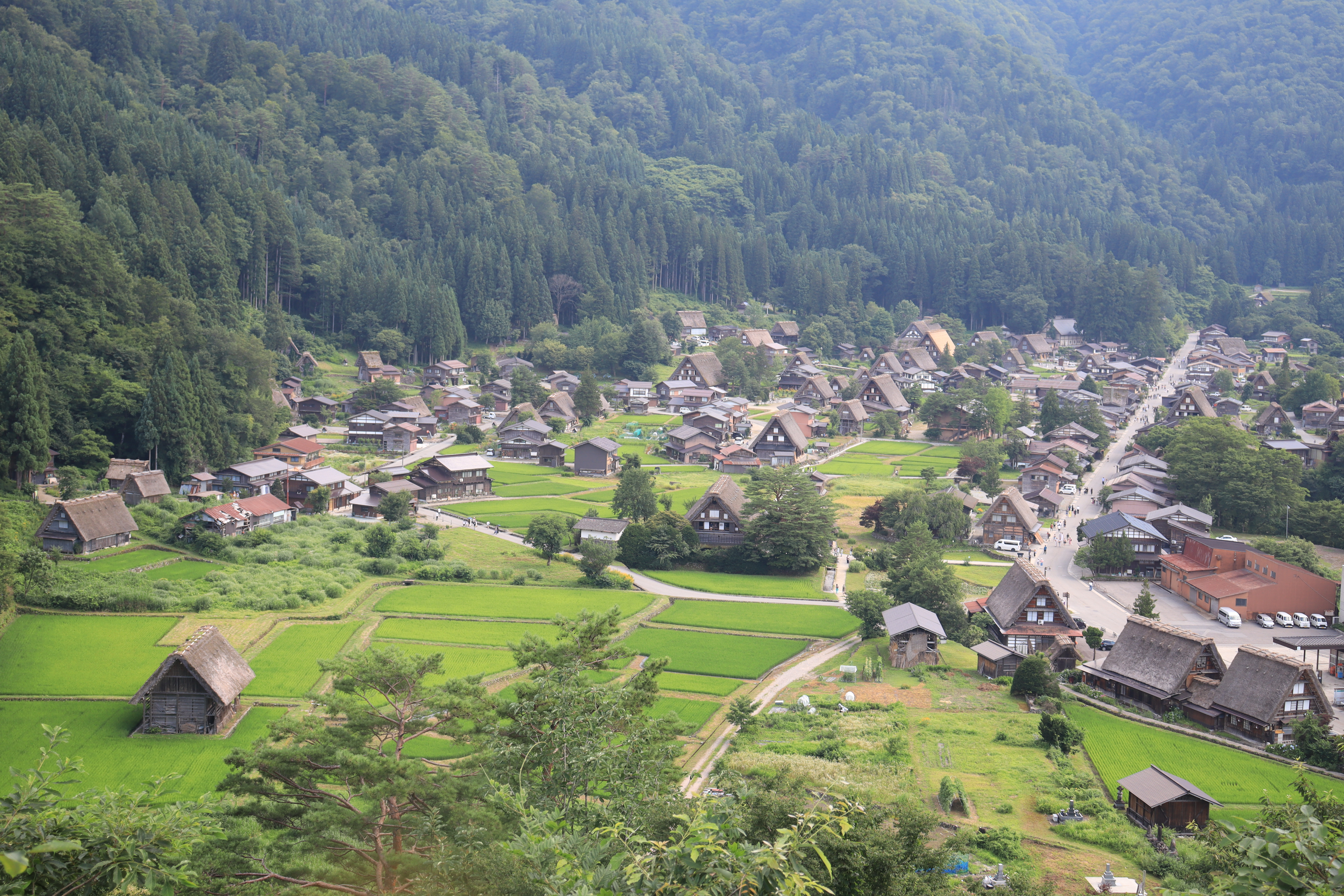
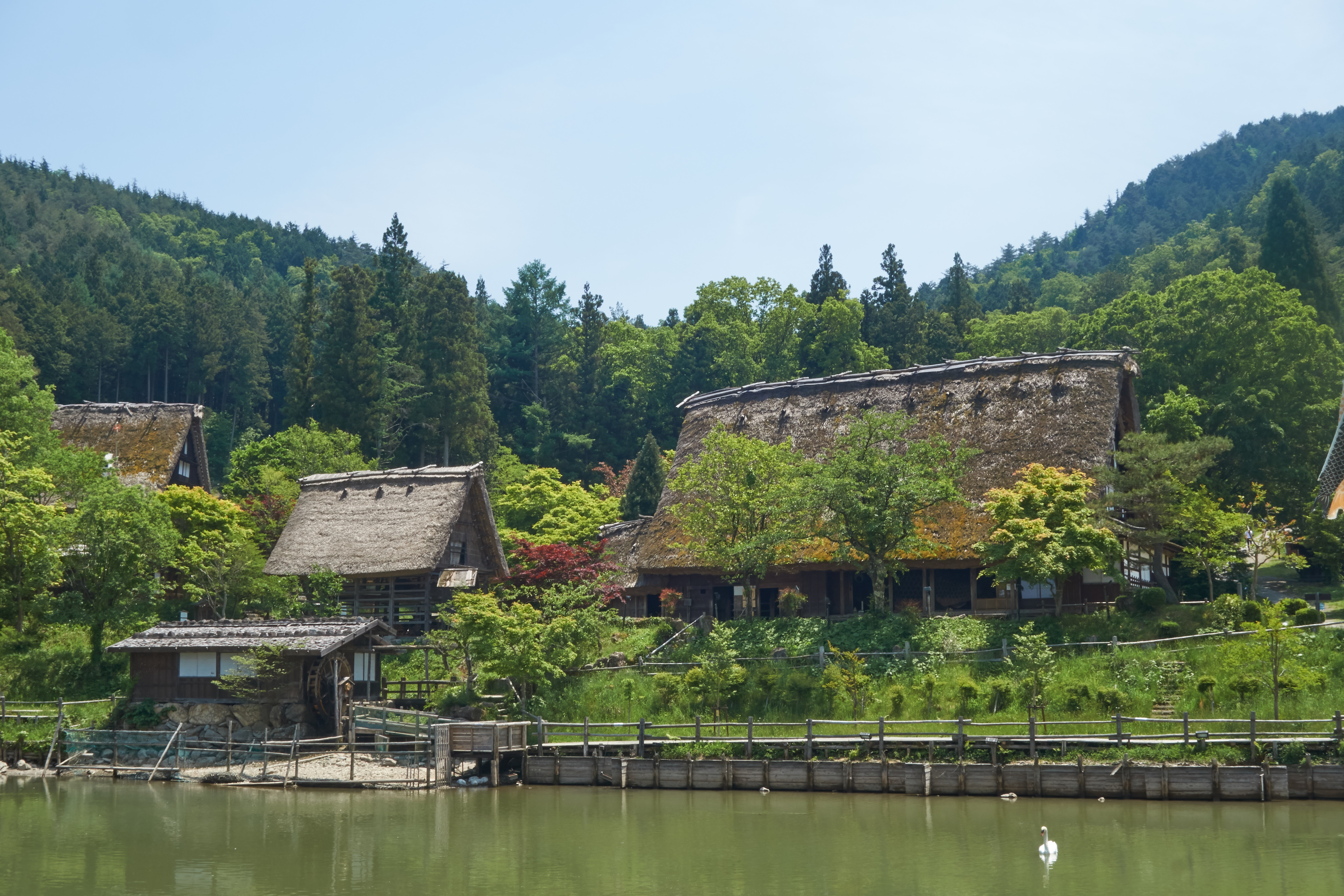
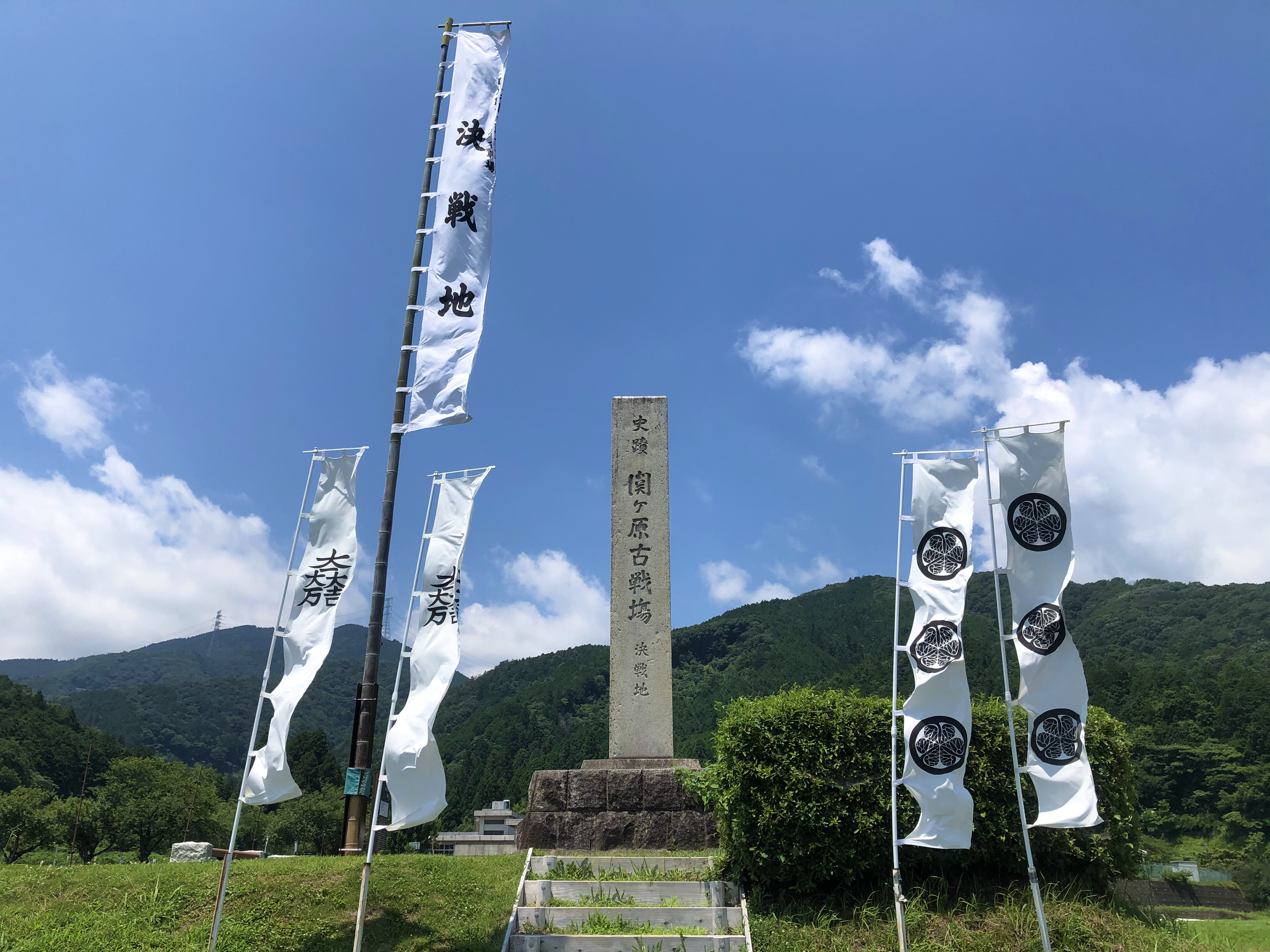
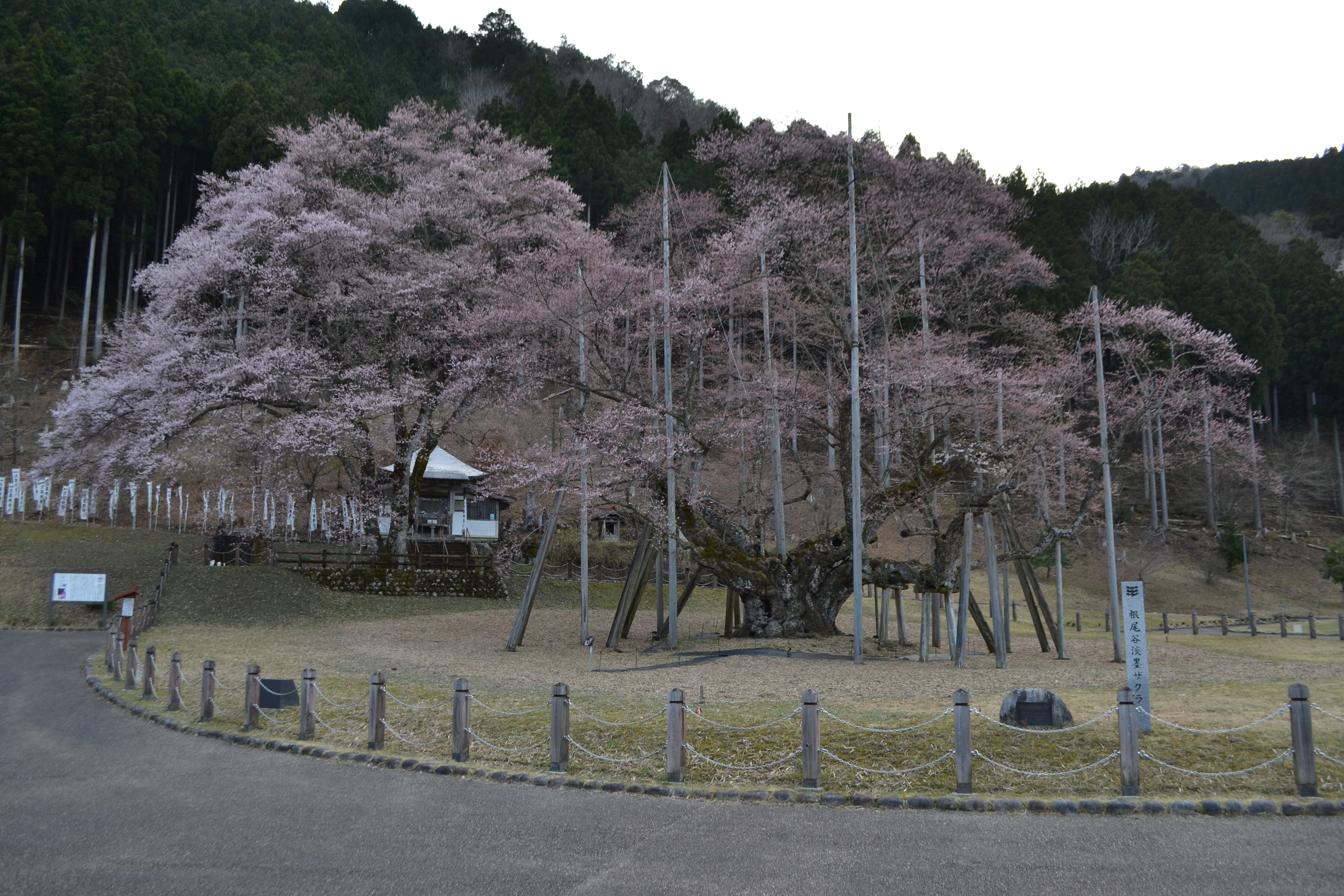
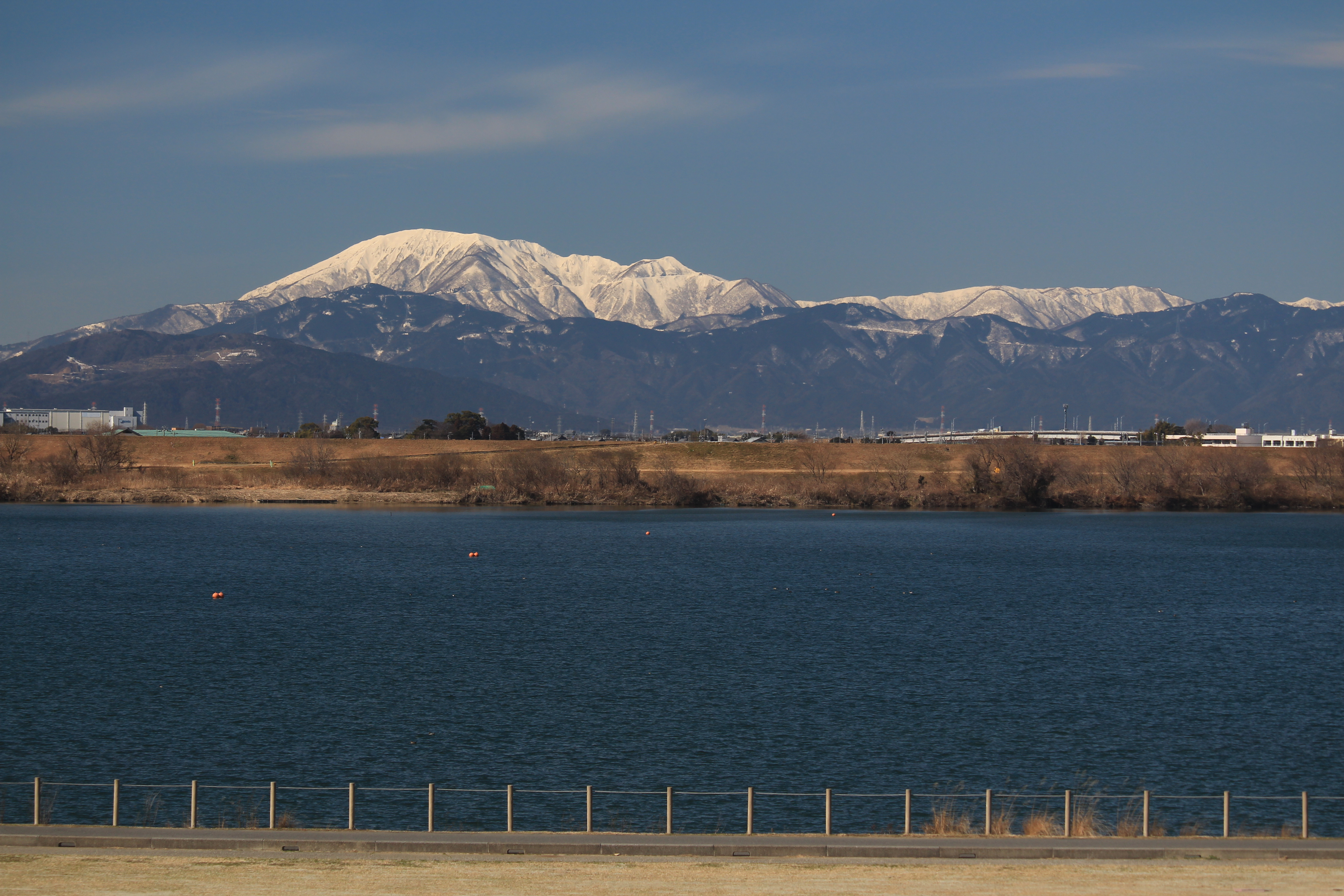
- Cormorant fishing on the Nagara River Magome-juku Spring Festival in Takayama Shirakawa-go Hida Minzoku Mura Folk Village A monument in Battle of Sekigahara Usuzumi cherry-blossom in Motosu Mount Ibuki and Kiso River

- Flag Symbol
- Anthem: Gifu kenmin no uta
- Country: Japan
- Region: Chūbu (Tōkai)
- Island: Honshu
- Capital: Gifu
- Subdivisions: Districts: 9, Municipalities: 42

Government
  - Governor: Yoshihide Esaki

Area
  - Total: 10,621.29 km^{2} (4,100.90 sq mi)
  - Rank: 7th

Population (Summer, 2026)
  - Total: 1,870,000
  - Rank: 17th
  - Density: 176/km^{2} (456/sq mi)

GDP
  - Total: JP¥8,225 billion US$60.8 billion (2022)
- ISO 3166 code: JP-21
- Website: www.pref.gifu.lg.jp/English
- Symbols of Japan
- Bird: Rock ptarmigan (Lagopus muta)
- Fish: Ayu (Plecoglossus altivelis)
- Flower: Chinese milk vetch (Astragalus sinicus)
- Tree: Japanese yew (Taxus cuspidata)

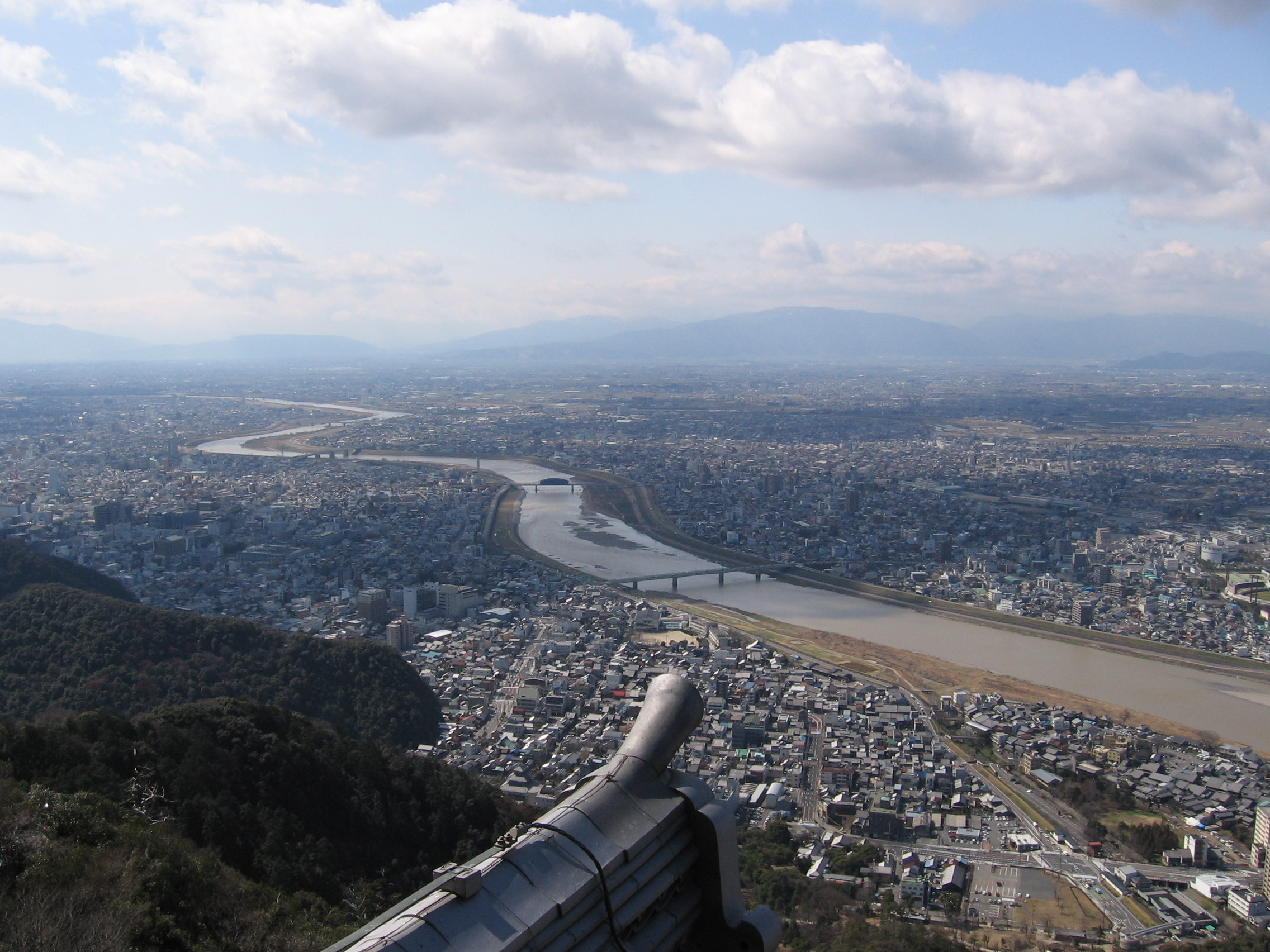
= Panoramic view of the Nōbi Plain with Gifu City, Gifu Prefecture seen from the top of Gifu Castle

Gifu Prefecture (岐阜県, Gifu-ken; Japanese pronunciation: [ɡ̟ʲì.ɸɯ̈́, -ɸɯ̥̈.kè̞ɴ̀, -ké̞ɴ̀]) is a prefecture of Japan located in the Chūbu region of Honshu. Gifu Prefecture has a population of 2,040,000 (as of April 1, 2025) and has a geographic area of 10,621 square kilometres (4,101 sq mi). Gifu Prefecture borders Toyama Prefecture to the north; Ishikawa Prefecture to the northwest, Fukui Prefecture and Shiga Prefecture to the west, Mie Prefecture to the southwest, Aichi Prefecture to the south, and Nagano Prefecture to the east.

Gifu is the capital and largest city of Gifu Prefecture, with other major cities including Ōgaki, Kakamigahara, and Tajimi.

Gifu Prefecture is located in the center of Japan, one of only eight inland prefectures, and features the country's center of population. Gifu Prefecture has served as the historic crossroads of Japan with routes connecting the east to the west, including the Nakasendō, one of the Five Routes of the Edo period. Gifu Prefecture was a long-term residence of Oda Nobunaga and Saitō Dōsan, two influential figures of Japanese history in the Sengoku period, spawning the popular phrase "control Gifu and you control Japan" in the late Medieval era. Gifu Prefecture is known for its traditional Washi paper industry, including Gifu lanterns and Gifu umbrellas, and as a center for the Japanese swordsmithing and cutlery industries. Gifu Prefecture is home to Gifu Castle, the 1,300-year-old tradition of cormorant fishing on the Nagara River, and the site of the Battle of Sekigahara.

== History ==
The land area that makes up modern-day Gifu became part of the Yamato Court around the middle of the fourth century. Because it is in the middle of the island of Honshu, it has been the site of many decisive battles throughout Japan's history, the oldest major one being the Jinshin War in 672, which led to the establishment of Emperor Tenmu as the 40th emperor of Japan.

The area of Gifu Prefecture consists of the old provinces of Hida and Mino, as well as smaller parts of Echizen and Shinano. The name of the prefecture derives from its capital city, Gifu, which was named by Oda Nobunaga during his campaign to unify all of Japan in 1567. The first character used comes from Qishan (岐山), a legendary mountain from which most of China was unified, whereas the second character comes from Qufu (曲阜), the birthplace of Confucius. Nobunaga chose those characters because he wanted to unify all of Japan and he wanted to be viewed as a great mind.

Historically, the prefecture served as the center of swordmaking for the whole of Japan, with Seki being known for making the best swords in Japan. More recently, its strengths have been in fashion (primarily in the city of Gifu) and aerospace engineering (Kakamigahara).

On October 28, 1891, the present-day city of Motosu was the epicenter for the Mino–Owari earthquake, the second largest earthquake to ever hit Japan. The earthquake, estimated at 8.0 (surface-wave magnitude), left a fault scarp that can still be seen today.

== Geography ==
One of the few landlocked prefectures in Japan, Gifu shares borders with seven other prefectures: Toyama, Ishikawa, Fukui, Shiga, Mie, Aichi, and Nagano. Japan's postal codes all start with a three-digit number, ranging from 001 to 999. Part of Gifu has the 500 prefix, reflecting its location in the center of Japan. The center of Japanese population is currently located in Seki City, Gifu Prefecture. The center of population is a hypothetical point at which a country is perfectly balanced assuming each person has a uniform weight. The spot was calculated using the 2005 census.

As of 31 March 2019, 18 percent of the total land area of the prefecture was designated as Natural Parks, namely the Hakusan and Chūbu-Sangaku National Parks, Hida-Kisogawa and Ibi-Sekigahara-Yōrō Quasi-National Parks, and fifteen Prefectural Natural Parks.

=== Regions ===
Gifu has five unofficial regions, which allows local municipalities to work together to promote the surrounding area. The five regions are Seinō, Gifu, Chūnō, Tōnō and Hida. The borders of the regions are loosely defined, but they are usually delineated among major cities.

=== Topography ===
The northern Hida region is dominated by tall mountains, including parts of the Japanese Alps. The southern Mino region is mostly parts of the fertile Nōbi Plain, a vast plains area with arable soil. Most of the prefecture's population lives in the southern part of the prefecture, near the designated city of Nagoya.

The mountainous Hida region contains the Hida Mountains, which are referred to as the "Northern Alps" in Japan. The Ryōhaku Mountains are also in the Hida region. Other major ranges include the Ibuki Mountains and the Yōrō Mountains.

Much of the Mino region is made up of the alluvial plain of the Kiso Three Rivers, which are the Kiso River, Nagara River and Ibi River. The sources of Kiso river is in Nagano prefecture, and those of the others are in Gifu prefecture. They eventually run through Aichi and Mie prefectures before emptying into Ise Bay. Other major rivers in the prefecture include the Miya, Takahara, Shō, Toki (Shōnai), Yahagi, and Itoshiro rivers.

=== Climate ===
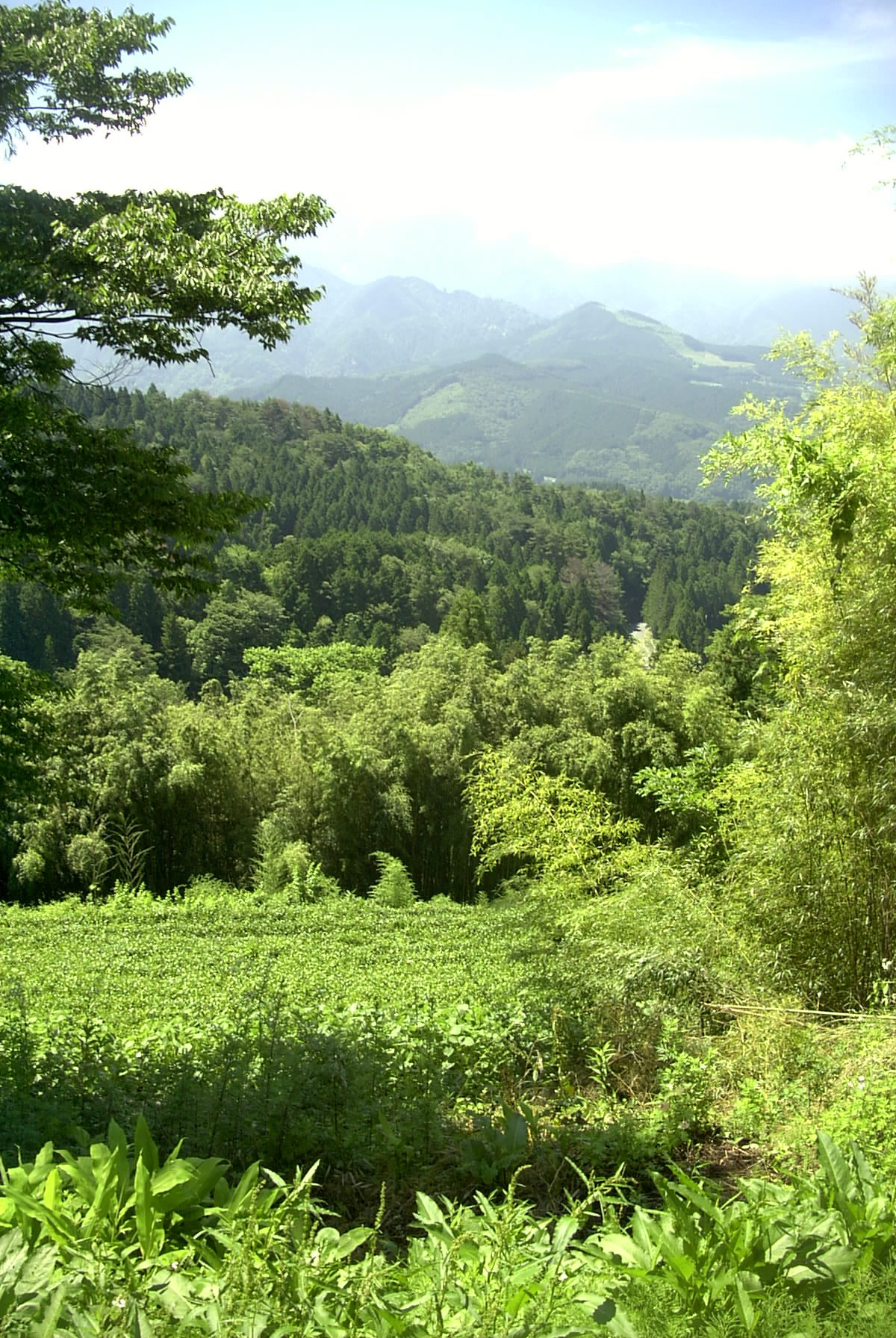
View from the top of a hill in Magome-juku, Nakatsugawa, Gifu Prefecture

Gifu's climate varies from humid subtropical climate in the south, eventually making the transition to humid continental climate in the north.

Because the Mino region is surrounded by low mountains, the temperature fluctuates through the year, from hot summers to cold winters. The eastern city of Tajimi, for example, often records the hottest temperature in Japan each year and is considered to be the hottest city within Honshu boasting an average daytime high of 34.1 °C (93.4 °F) during the peak of summer. On August 16, 2007, Tajimi set the record for the hottest day recorded in Japan's history—40.9 °C (105.6 °F). Summers are hotter, as the landlocked area becomes a heat island, and the temperature rises even further when hot, dry foehn winds blow over the Ibuki Mountains from the Kansai region. The Hida region, with its higher elevation and northerly latitude, is significantly cooler than the Mino region, although there are sometimes extremely hot days there too. The Hida region is more famous for its harsh winters, bringing extremely heavy snowfall, especially in the northwestern areas. Gifu boasts a high amount of skiing locations. Shōkawa-chō, part of the city of Takayama, is up in the mountains, and its location has led it to be called the coldest inhabited place on Honshū.

Gifu City (Mino Region)

Climate data for Gifu, Gifu (1981–2010)
Month	Jan	Feb	Mar	Apr	May	Jun	Jul	Aug	Sep	Oct	Nov	Dec	Year
Record high °C (°F)	20.4 (68.7)	22.2 (72.0)	25.8 (78.4)	30.8 (87.4)	33.5 (92.3)	36.2 (97.2)	39.0 (102.2)	39.8 (103.6)	37.7 (99.9)	31.0 (87.8)	26.7 (80.1)	21.1 (70.0)	39.8 (103.6)
Mean daily maximum °C (°F)	8.8 (47.8)	10.0 (50.0)	13.7 (56.7)	19.8 (67.6)	24.2 (75.6)	27.4 (81.3)	31.0 (87.8)	33.0 (91.4)	28.8 (83.8)	23.1 (73.6)	17.2 (63.0)	11.6 (52.9)	20.7 (69.3)
Mean daily minimum °C (°F)	0.5 (32.9)	0.9 (33.6)	3.9 (39.0)	9.3 (48.7)	14.2 (57.6)	19.0 (66.2)	23.0 (73.4)	24.3 (75.7)	20.4 (68.7)	13.8 (56.8)	7.7 (45.9)	2.7 (36.9)	11.6 (52.9)
Record low °C (°F)	−14.3 (6.3)	−13.7 (7.3)	−6.7 (19.9)	−2.8 (27.0)	1.7 (35.1)	6.8 (44.2)	12.8 (55.0)	14.0 (57.2)	8.3 (46.9)	0.8 (33.4)	−2.4 (27.7)	−8.7 (16.3)	−14.3 (6.3)
Average precipitation mm (inches)	67.0 (2.64)	82.1 (3.23)	143.0 (5.63)	161.2 (6.35)	204.7 (8.06)	245.3 (9.66)	261.6 (10.30)	148.9 (5.86)	237.3 (9.34)	125.5 (4.94)	93.0 (3.66)	58.0 (2.28)	1,827.6 (71.95)
Average snowfall cm (inches)	19 (7.5)	17 (6.7)	1 (0.4)	0 (0)	0 (0)	0 (0)	0 (0)	0 (0)	0 (0)	0 (0)	0 (0)	9 (3.5)	46 (18.1)
Average precipitation days (≥ 0.5 mm)	9.5	9.7	10.7	10.7	11.6	12.7	13.7	9.7	12.5	9.3	8.1	9.3	127.5
Average snowy days	9.4	8.2	2.9	0.2	0.0	0.0	0.0	0.0	0.0	0.0	0.1	3.7	24.5
Average relative humidity (%)	67	63	60	60	65	71	74	70	71	67	67	68	67
Mean monthly sunshine hours	160.3	163.6	188.3	196.0	199.0	159.4	167.0	202.2	157.8	174.2	157.3	160.2	2,085.3
Source 1: Japan Meteorological Agency
Source 2: Japan Meteorological Agency (records)

Hida Takayama (Hida Region)

Climate data for Central Takayama, Gifu (1971–2000)
Month	Jan	Feb	Mar	Apr	May	Jun	Jul	Aug	Sep	Oct	Nov	Dec	Year
Record high °C (°F)	16.7 (62.1)	18.5 (65.3)	23.4 (74.1)	30.6 (87.1)	32.1 (89.8)	34.7 (94.5)	36.1 (97.0)	37.3 (99.1)	35.4 (95.7)	29.4 (84.9)	23.9 (75.0)	21.7 (71.1)	37.3 (99.1)
Mean daily maximum °C (°F)	2.9 (37.2)	3.6 (38.5)	8.5 (47.3)	16.5 (61.7)	21.9 (71.4)	25.2 (77.4)	28.7 (83.7)	30.1 (86.2)	24.9 (76.8)	18.8 (65.8)	12.3 (54.1)	5.9 (42.6)	16.6 (61.9)
Daily mean °C (°F)	−2.1 (28.2)	−1.1 (30.0)	2.9 (37.2)	9.7 (49.5)	15.2 (59.4)	19.8 (67.6)	23.6 (74.5)	24.7 (76.5)	20.1 (68.2)	13.4 (56.1)	7.2 (45.0)	1.6 (34.9)	11.2 (52.2)
Mean daily minimum °C (°F)	−7.1 (19.2)	−5.7 (21.7)	−2.5 (27.5)	2.9 (37.2)	8.4 (47.1)	14.3 (57.7)	18.5 (65.3)	19.3 (66.7)	15.1 (59.2)	7.9 (46.2)	2.0 (35.6)	−2.7 (27.1)	6.0 (42.8)
Record low °C (°F)	−23.5 (−10.3)	−25.5 (−13.9)	−21.2 (−6.2)	−7.6 (18.3)	−3.1 (26.4)	1.8 (35.2)	8.1 (46.6)	9.4 (48.9)	3.8 (38.8)	−3.5 (25.7)	−10.7 (12.7)	−19.5 (−3.1)	−25.5 (−13.9)
Average precipitation mm (inches)	88.9 (3.50)	99.7 (3.93)	120.5 (4.74)	139.1 (5.48)	134.8 (5.31)	193.1 (7.60)	226.2 (8.91)	169.1 (6.66)	257.8 (10.15)	126.7 (4.99)	98.5 (3.88)	79.3 (3.12)	1,733.5 (68.25)
Average snowfall cm (inches)	166 (65)	155 (61)	66 (26)	7 (2.8)	0 (0)	0 (0)	0 (0)	0 (0)	0 (0)	0 (0)	15 (5.9)	98 (39)	511 (201)
Mean monthly sunshine hours	95.6	112.6	150.9	174.6	181.3	143.0	146.5	180.5	124.1	125.8	98.9	89.0	1,623.7
Source 1: Japan Meteorological Agency
Source 2: All Met Sat

Shōkawa, Takayama (Hida Region)

Climate data for Shōkawa, Takayama, Gifu (1971–2000)
Month	Jan	Feb	Mar	Apr	May	Jun	Jul	Aug	Sep	Oct	Nov	Dec	Year
Mean daily maximum °C (°F)	−0.2 (31.6)	0.7 (33.3)	4.6 (40.3)	12.1 (53.8)	17.8 (64.0)	21.2 (70.2)	24.7 (76.5)	26.1 (79.0)	21.6 (70.9)	15.6 (60.1)	9.5 (49.1)	3.0 (37.4)	13.0 (55.4)
Daily mean °C (°F)	−5.1 (22.8)	−4.9 (23.2)	−1.1 (30.0)	5.2 (41.4)	10.9 (51.6)	15.4 (59.7)	19.4 (66.9)	20.3 (68.5)	16.1 (61.0)	9.2 (48.6)	3.1 (37.6)	−2.3 (27.9)	7.2 (45.0)
Mean daily minimum °C (°F)	−11.7 (10.9)	−12.3 (9.9)	−7.5 (18.5)	−1.8 (28.8)	3.5 (38.3)	9.6 (49.3)	14.7 (58.5)	15.5 (59.9)	11.3 (52.3)	3.4 (38.1)	−2.6 (27.3)	−8.0 (17.6)	1.2 (34.2)
Average precipitation mm (inches)	152.0 (5.98)	135.4 (5.33)	173.4 (6.83)	175.9 (6.93)	221.2 (8.71)	262.4 (10.33)	331.8 (13.06)	233.6 (9.20)	324.6 (12.78)	165.4 (6.51)	143.8 (5.66)	137.1 (5.40)	2,439.3 (96.04)
Mean monthly sunshine hours	75.8	103.3	149.6	181.6	185.1	143.2	138.2	155.6	117.0	128.3	102.3	81.7	1,563.7
Source: Japan Meteorological Agency

== Municipalities ==
Map of Gifu Prefecture City Town Village

All of the cities, towns, villages and districts of Gifu Prefecture are listed below.

=== Cities ===
Twenty-one cities are located in Gifu Prefecture:

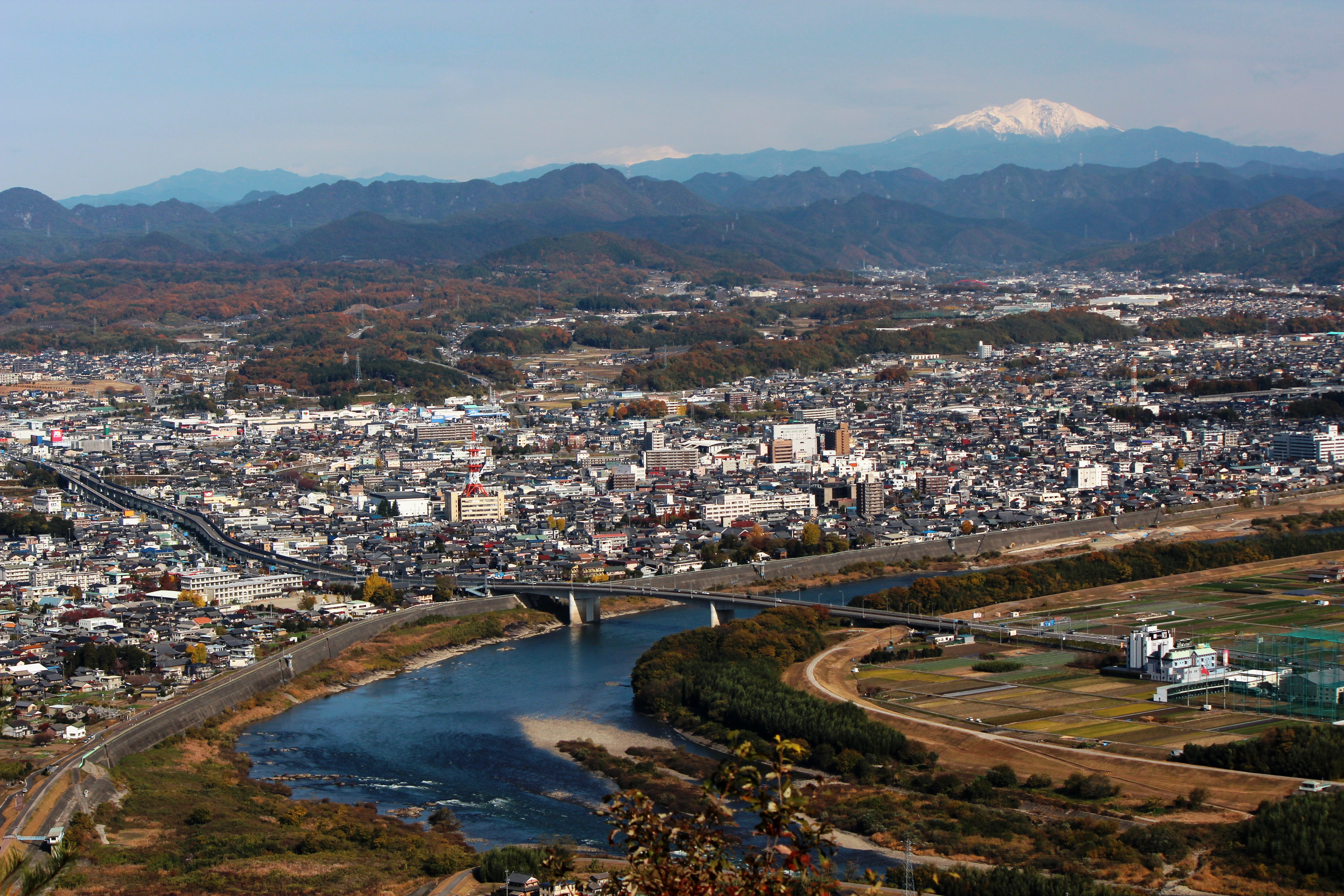
Minokamo

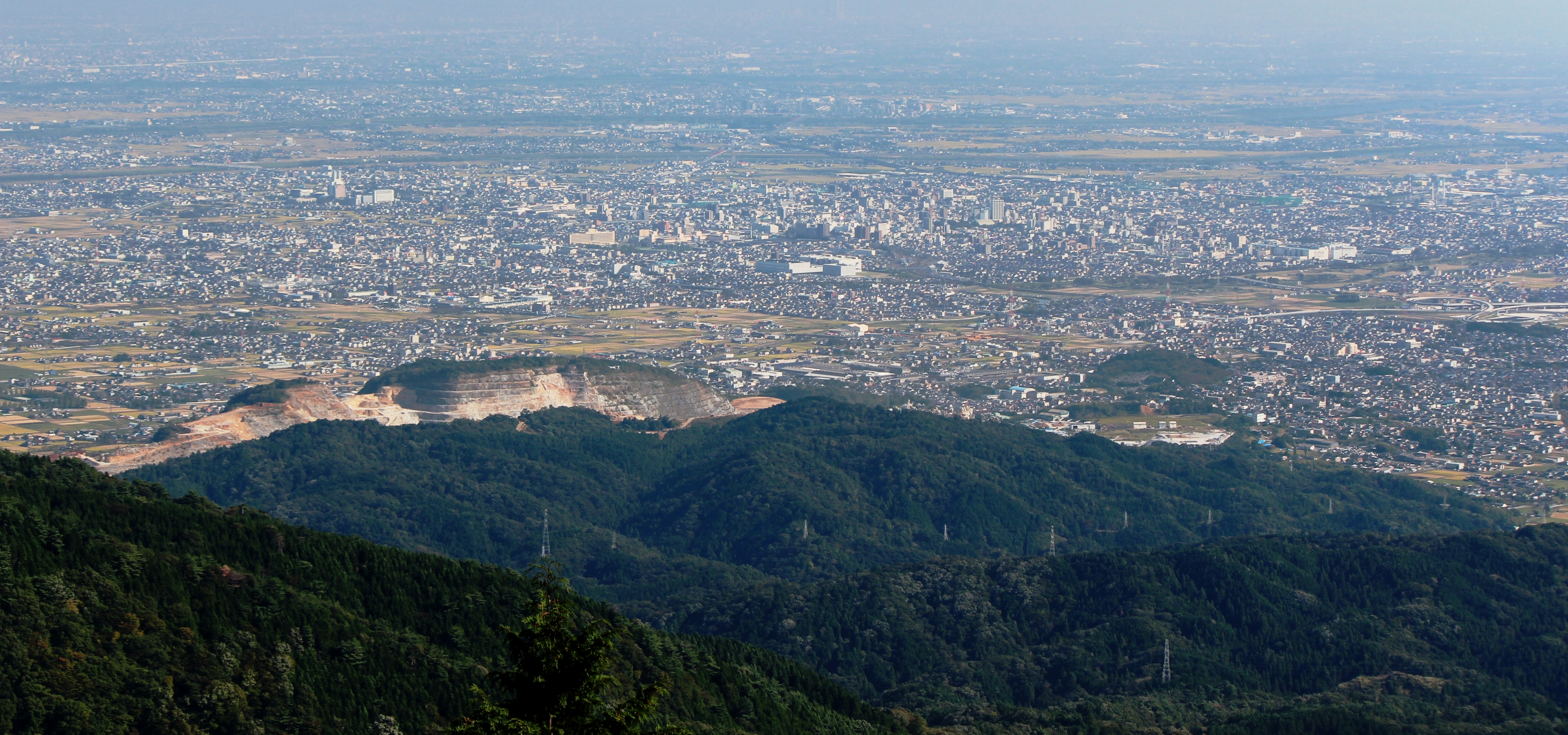
Ōgaki

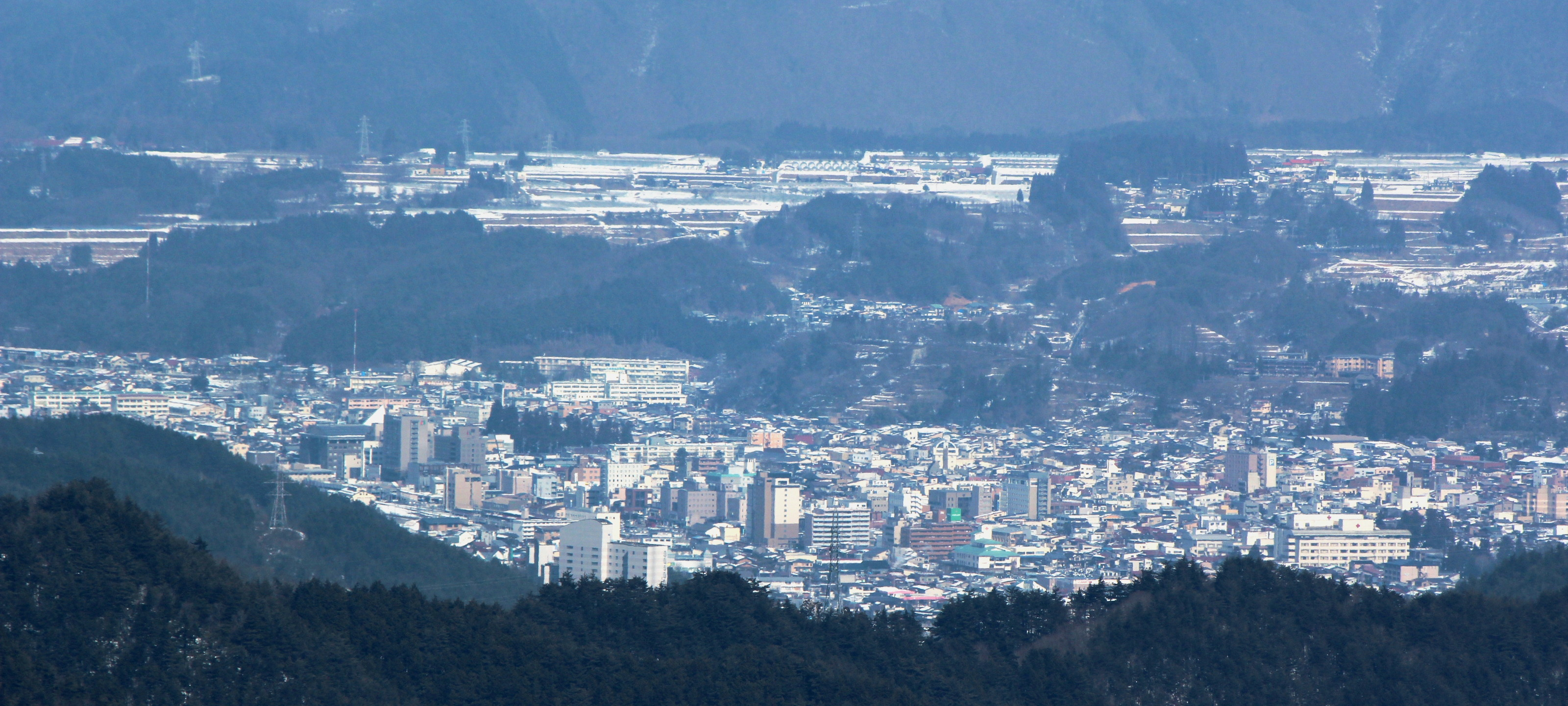
Takayama

Name		Area (km^{2})	Population	Map
Rōmaji	Kanji	Area (km^{2})	Population	Map
Ena	恵那市	504.24	48,777	
Gero	下呂市	851.21	33,283	
Gifu (capital)	岐阜市	203.60	400,118	
Gujō	郡上市	1,030.75	41,858	
Hashima	羽島市	53.66	67,909	
Hida	飛騨市	792.53	24,726	
Kaizu	海津市	112.03	34,960	
Kakamigahara	各務原市	87.81	148,225	
Kani	可児市	87.57	99,826	
Mino	美濃市	117.01	20,749	
Minokamo	美濃加茂市	74.81	56,972	
Mizuho	瑞穂市	28.19	54,686	
Mizunami	瑞浪市	174.86	37,705	
Motosu	本巣市	374.65	34,453	
Nakatsugawa	中津川市	676.45	78,930	
Ōgaki	大垣市	206.57	161,539	
Seki	関市	472.33	89,020	
Tajimi	多治見市	91.25	110,070	
Takayama	高山市	2,177.61	81,968	
Toki	土岐市	116.02	58,567	
Yamagata	山県市	221.98	27,356	

=== Towns and villages ===
These are the towns and villages in each district:

Name		Area (km^{2})	Population	District	Map
Rōmaji	Kanji	Area (km^{2})	Population	District	Map
Anpachi	安八町	18.19	15,072	Anpachi District	
Ginan	岐南町	7.91	25,661	Hashima District	
Gōdo	神戸町	18.78	19,361	Anpachi District	
Hichisō	七宗町	40.4	3,801	Kamo District	
Higashishirakawa	東白川村	87.09	2,278	Kamo District	
Ibigawa	揖斐川町	803.44	21,319	Ibi District	
Ikeda	池田町	38.80	24,034	Ibi District	
Kasamatsu	笠松町	10.3	22,273	Hashima District	
Kawabe	川辺町	41.16	10,303	Kamo District	
Kitagata	北方町	5.18	18,410	Motosu District	
Mitake	御嵩町	56.69	18,363	Kani District	
Ōno	大野町	34.20	23,111	Ibi District	
Sakahogi	坂祝町	12.87	8,253	Kamo District	
Sekigahara	関ケ原町	49.28	7,109	Fuwa District	
Shirakawa	白川町	237.90	8,288	Kamo District	
Shirakawa	白川村	356.64	1,630	Ōno District	
Tarui	垂井町	57.09	25,632	Fuwa District	
Tomika	富加町	16.82	5,714	Kamo District	
Wanouchi	輪之内町	22.33	9,910	Anpachi District	
Yaotsu	八百津町	128.79	11,036	Kamo District	
Yōrō	養老町	72.29	29,309	Yōrō District	

== Economy ==
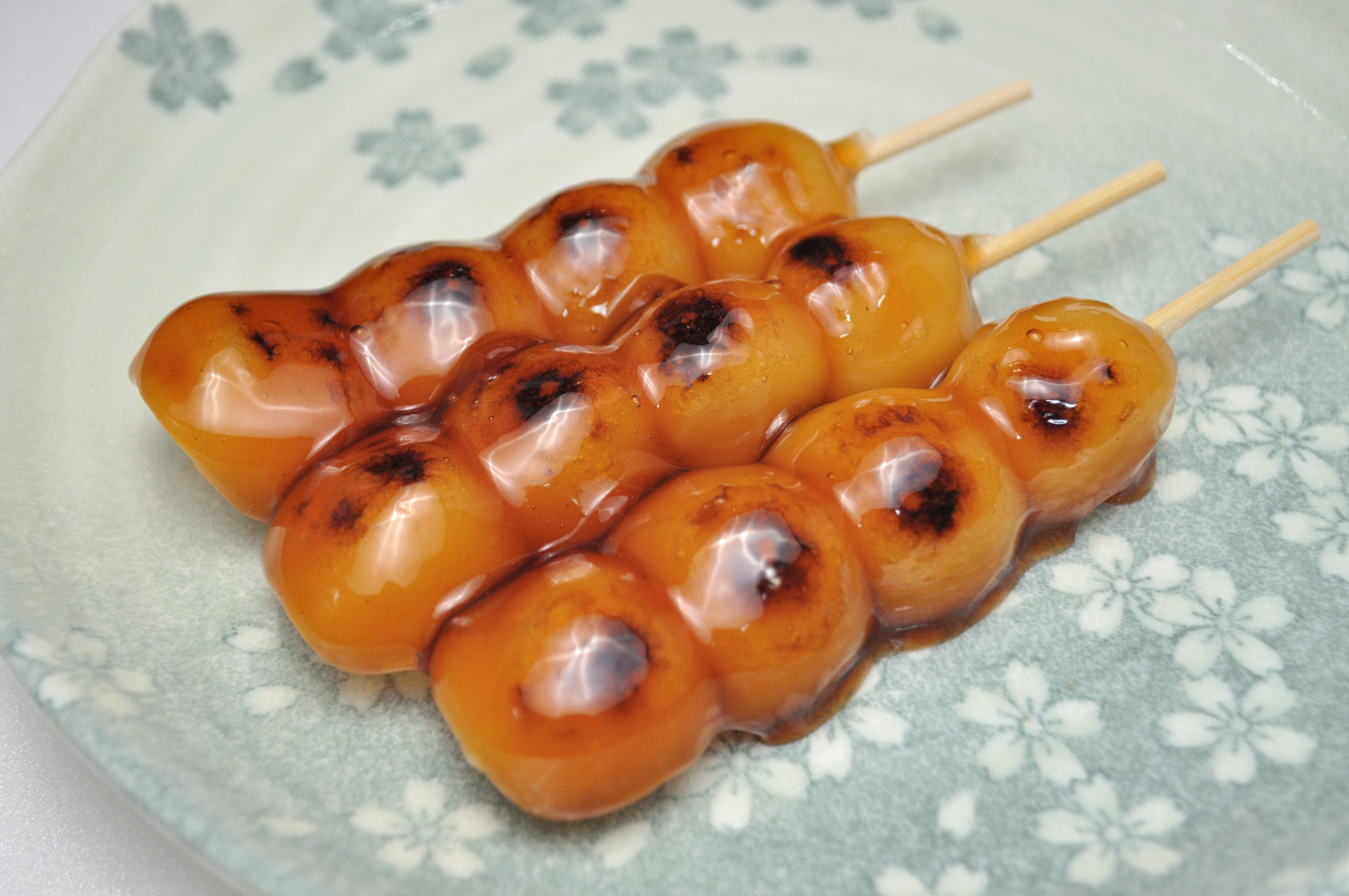
Mitarashi dango, a traditional sweet dumpling from Hida, Gifu

Traditional industries such as paper-making and agriculture are found in Gifu, but its economy is dominated by the manufacturing sector including aerospace and automotive, with industrial complexes extending from the Nagoya area. A wealth of small component manufacturing is also found, such as precision machines, dye and mold making, and plastic forming.

=== Traditional industries ===
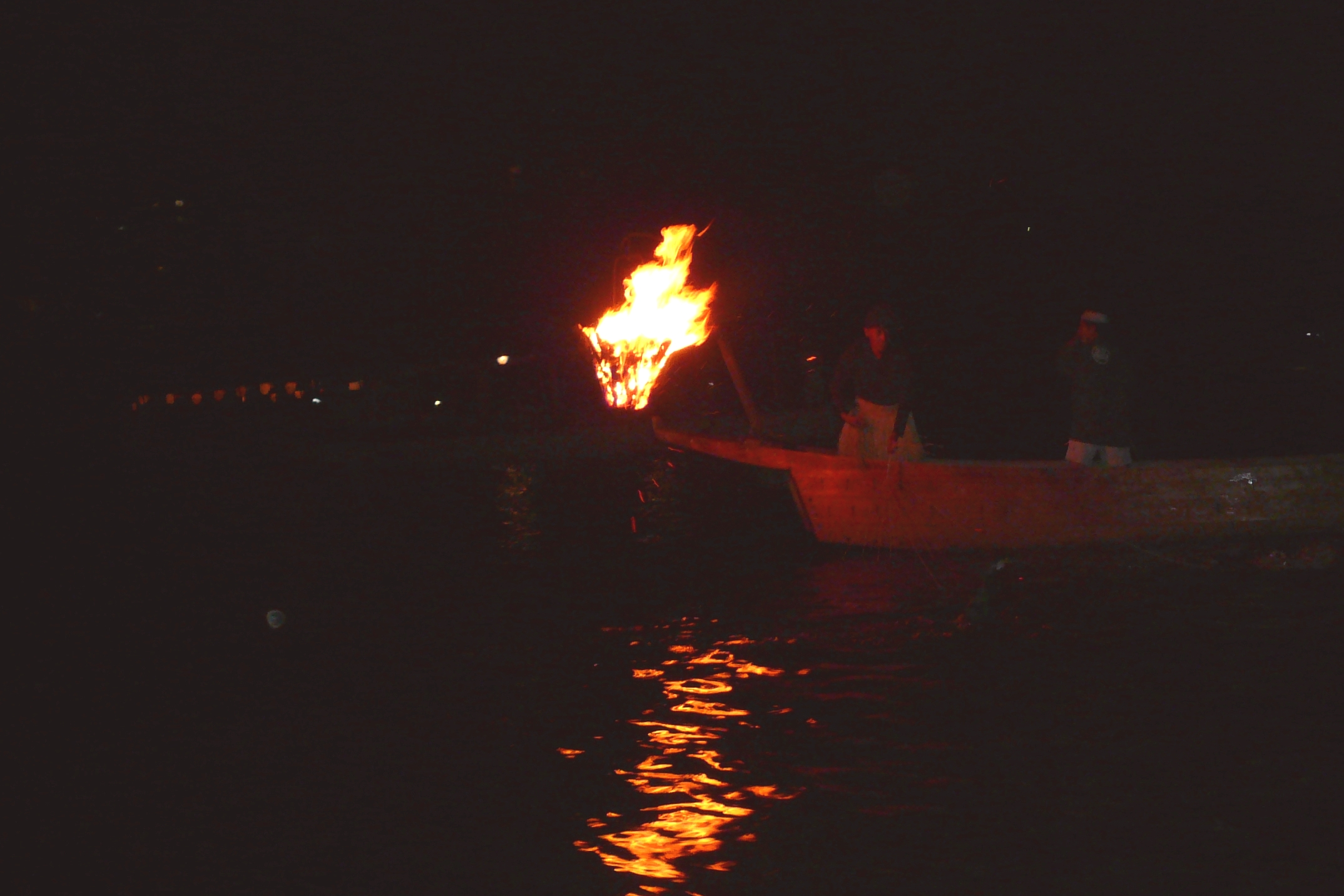
Cormorant fishing in Nagara River

Gifu is famous for cormorant fishing, which has a history of over 1,300 years. Agriculture is also a major industry because of Gifu's vast, arable plains. The forests in the north provide materials for woodworking and for the viewing boats used in cormorant fishing.

The Mino region has long been known for its high-quality paper called Mino washi, which is stronger and thinner than most other papers in Japan, and was used by the Japanese military during World War II. Other paper-based products include Gifu Lanterns and Gifu Umbrellas, made in the prefectural capital of Gifu. Other traditional goods include mino-yaki pottery in Tajimi, Toki, and Mizunami, cutlery in Seki, and lacquerware in Takayama. Sake is often brewed with clear water from the rivers.

=== Modern industries ===
Kakamigahara has a large role in the prefecture's modern industries. It boasts large aerospace facilities of both Kawasaki Heavy Industries and Mitsubishi Heavy Industries, as well as many metalworking and manufacturing companies.

Information technology (IT) is gaining a foothold in the prefecture with both Softopia Japan in Ōgaki and VR Techno Japan (part of Techno Plaza) in Kakamigahara. The capital city of Gifu, located between Ōgaki and Kakamigahara, is also working to strengthen its IT fields, too.

=== Tourism ===
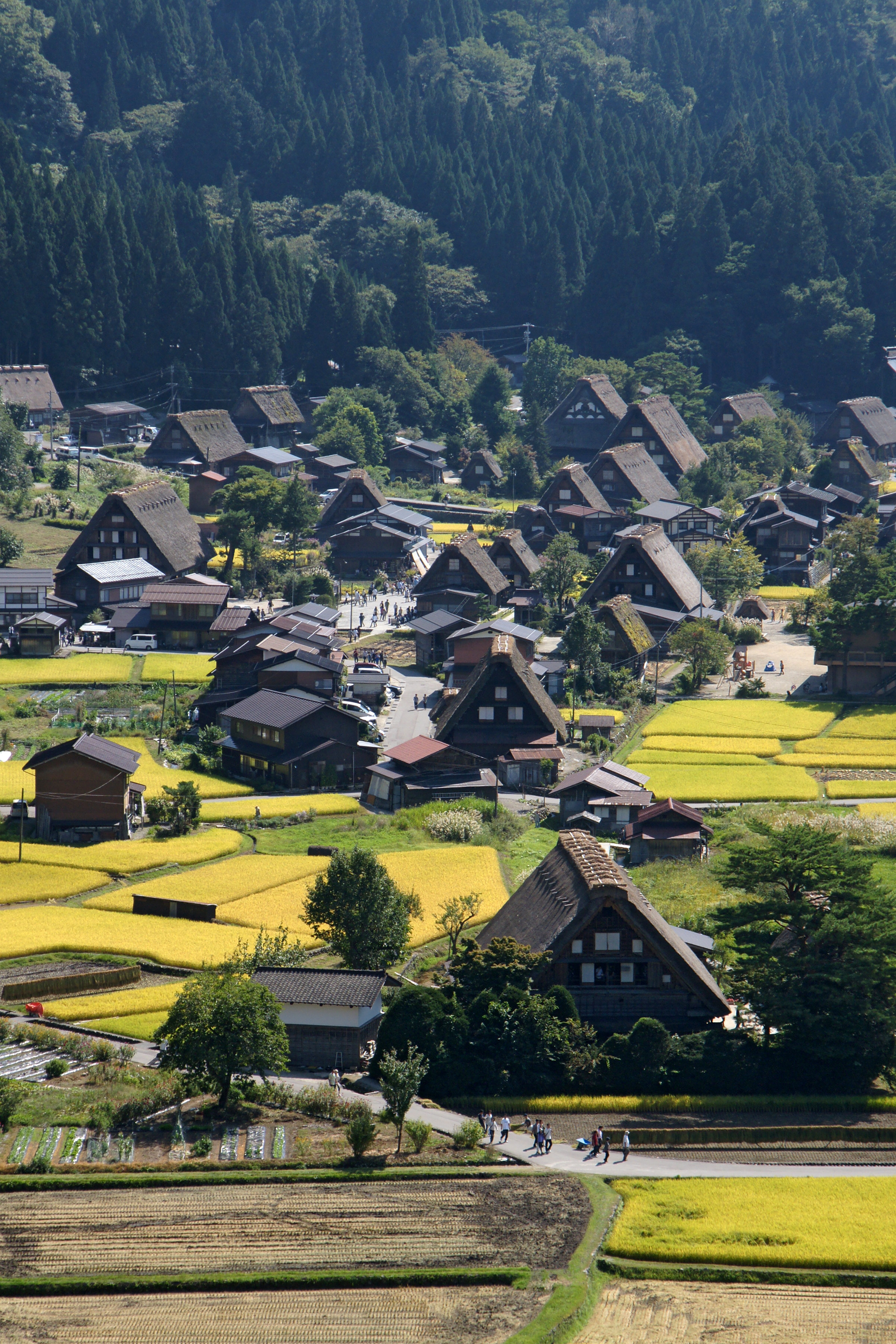
Traditional housing in Shirakawa-gō

Gifu has many popular tourist attractions, bringing visitors to all parts of the prefecture. The most popular places are Gifu, Gero, Shirakawa and Takayama. Gero is known for its relaxing hot springs, which attract visitors throughout the year. Shirakawa's historic villages are a UNESCO World Heritage Site. Takayama is famous for retaining its original appearance and is often referred to as Little Kyoto.

In addition to international tourists, Gifu also plays host to many international events. The World Event and Convention Complex Gifu is available for many types of events. Other areas of Gifu, too, bring international events. The World Rowing Championships were held in the city of Kaizu in 2005. The FIS Snowboard World Cup was held in the city of Gujo in 2008. The APEC Japan 2010 SME Ministerial Meetings were held in Gifu City.

=== Science ===
The Kamioka area of the city of Hida is home to the Kamioka Observatory underground laboratory. Located 1,000 m (3,281 ft) underground in Kamioka Mining and Smelting Co.'s Mozumi Mine, the Super-Kamiokande experiment searches for neutrinos from the high atmosphere, the sun and supernovae, while the KamLAND experiment searches for antineutrinos from regional nuclear reactors. The Super-Kamiokande consists of a cylindrical stainless steel tank that is 41.4 m (136 ft) tall and 39.3 m (129 ft) in diameter holding 50,000 tons of ultra-pure water. Some of the 11,146 photomultiplier tubes are on display at the Miraikan in Tokyo. The same facility also hosts the CLIO prototype and KAGRA gravitational wave detector.

== Demographics ==
Gifu prefecture population pyramid in 2020

The prefecture's population was 2,040,000, as of 1 April 2025, with approximately 1.8 million people in the cities and the rest in towns and villages. The percentage of male and female residents is 48.4% and 51.6%, respectively. 14.4% of the population is no more than 14 years old, with 22.1% of the population being at least 65 years old.

According to Japan's census, the country's center of population is located in Gifu Prefecture. In 2000, it was located in the former town of Mugi, which has since merged with Seki. In the most recent census in 2005, the center of population has moved slightly more to the east but is still located within Gifu.

== Education ==
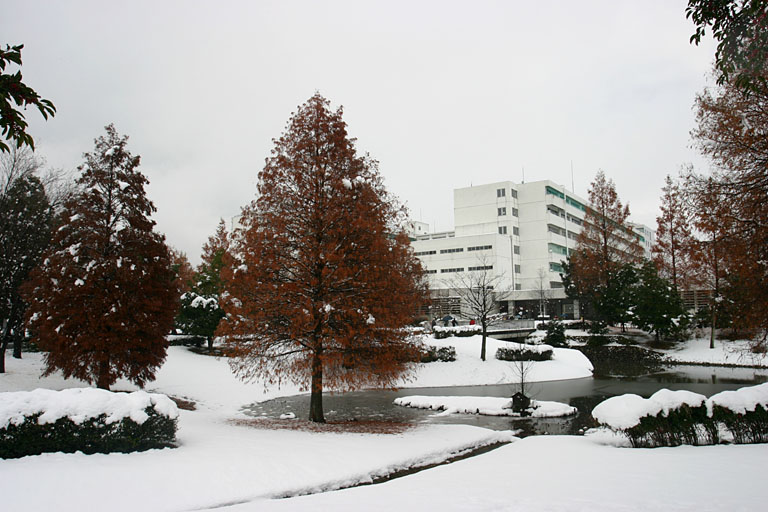
Gifu University Faculty of Engineering

- Asahi University
- Chubu Gakuin University
- Chukyo Gakuin University
- Gifu City Women's College
- Gifu College of Nursing
- Gifu Keizai University
- Gifu Pharmaceutical University
- Gifu Shotoku Gakuen University
- Gifu University
- Gifu University of Medical Science
- Gifu Women's University
- Institute of Advanced Media Arts and Sciences
- Tokai Gakuin University

== Transportation ==
=== Rail ===
- Akechi Railway
- JR Central
  - Chuo Line
  - Taita Line
  - Takayama Line
  - Tokaido Line
  - Tokaido Shinkansen – Gifu-Hashima Station
- Meitetsu
  - Hashima Line
  - Hiromi Line
  - Inuyama Line
  - Kakamigahara Line
  - Nagoya Line
  - Takehana Line
- Nagaragawa Railway
- Tarumi Railway
- Yoro Railway

=== Road ===
==== Expressway and toll roads ====
- Chubu Jukan Expressway
- Chuo Expressway
- Hakusan Forest Road
- Meishin Expressway
- Mount Ibuki Toll Road
- Nagaragawa Riversideway
- Tokai Hokuriku Expressway
- Tokai Loop Expressway

==== National highways ====
- Route 19
- Route 21
- Route 22
- Route 41
- Route 156
- Route 157
- Route 158
- Route 248
- Route 256
- Route 257
- Route 258
- Route 303
- Route 360
- Route 361
- Route 363
- Route 365
- Route 417
- Route 418
- Route 419
- Route 471
- Route 472
- Route 475

== Prefectural symbols ==
Prefectural Logo

Gifu's symbol comes from the first character gi (岐) of its Japanese name, written in a stylized script, surrounded by a circle, which represents the peace and harmony of the prefectural citizen. It was chosen by contest in 1932.

The prefectural logo (see right) expands from the red dot into the center to the outer two lines and, finally, the yellow plain. This symbol was chosen in 1991 for the development and expansion of the prefecture.

The prefecture also has two plants (the milk vetch (renge) and the Japanese yew) and two animals (the snow grouse and the ayu) as symbols. The milk vetch was chosen in 1954, because the prefecture is well known for its abundance of blooming milk vetch each spring. The yew was chosen in 1966, because it is the tree used to make ornamental scepters for the emperor, many of which came from the Hida district. The snow grouse was chosen in 1961, as the birds live up in the Japanese alps and is a nationally protected species. Ayu were chosen in 1989, because the fish is found in many prefectural rivers and is prized for its sweet taste.

== Notable people ==
- Chitose Abe, fashion designer
- Chie Aoki, sculptor
- Junji Ito, manga artist
- LiSA, singer-songwriter, lyricist.
- Tsuyoshi Makino, author and social activist
- Rie Matsubara, rhythmic gymnast
- n-buna, musician
- Airi Suzuki, Japanese singer, actress, model and radio personality
- Kaiu Shirai, manga artist
- Chiune Sugihara, diplomat
- Teiji Takagi, mathematician
- Toshio Takai, trade unionist

== See also ==
- Solar Ark, a solar energy project located in Gifu Prefecture
