= Albert Tye =

English footballer

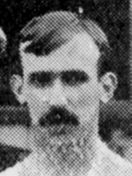

Personal information
- Full name: Albert Edward Tye
- Date of birth: 1883
- Place of birth: Boylestone, England
- Date of death: 25 January 1917 (aged 33)
- Place of death: near Kut, Iraq
- Positions: Left half; left back

Senior career*
| Years | Team | Apps | (Gls) |
| –1904 | Burton United | 5 | (0) |
| 1904–1906 | Chesterfield Town | 26 | (0) |
- Tutbury Town
- * Club domestic league appearances and goals

Albert Edward Tye (1883 – 25 January 1917) was an English professional footballer who played in the Football League for Chesterfield Town and Burton United as a left half and left back.

== Personal life ==
Following his football career, Tye lived in Burton upon Trent and worked as a painter. On 22 January 1915, six months after the outbreak of the First World War, Tye enlisted as a private in the Prince of Wales's (North Staffordshire Regiment). While serving as an appointed lance corporal, he was killed in action at the Hai Salient, near Kut, Iraq, on 25 January 1917. He is commemorated on the Basra Memorial.

== Career statistics ==
Appearances and goals by club, season and competition
| Club | Season | League | | | FA Cup | | Total | |
| Club | Season | Division | Apps | Goals | Apps | Goals | Apps | Goals |
|---|---|---|---|---|---|---|---|---|
| Chesterfield Town | 1904–05 | Second Division | 17 | 0 | 0 | 0 | 17 | 0 |
| Chesterfield Town | 1905–06 | Second Division | 9 | 0 | 0 | 0 | 9 | 0 |
| Career total | | | 26 | 0 | 0 | 0 | 26 | 0 |
