= Tying =

Tying may refer to:

- Fly tying, process of producing an artificial fly
- Knot tying, techniques of fastening ropes
- Tying (commerce), making a customer buy one thing to get another
- 'Tying' or 'knotting', part of canine reproduction
- Tying Tiffany, Italian singer (born 1978)

== See also ==
- Tie (disambiguation)
