= Tey Por Yee =

Malaysian businessman

Yang Berbahagia Dato' Larry Tey DIMP
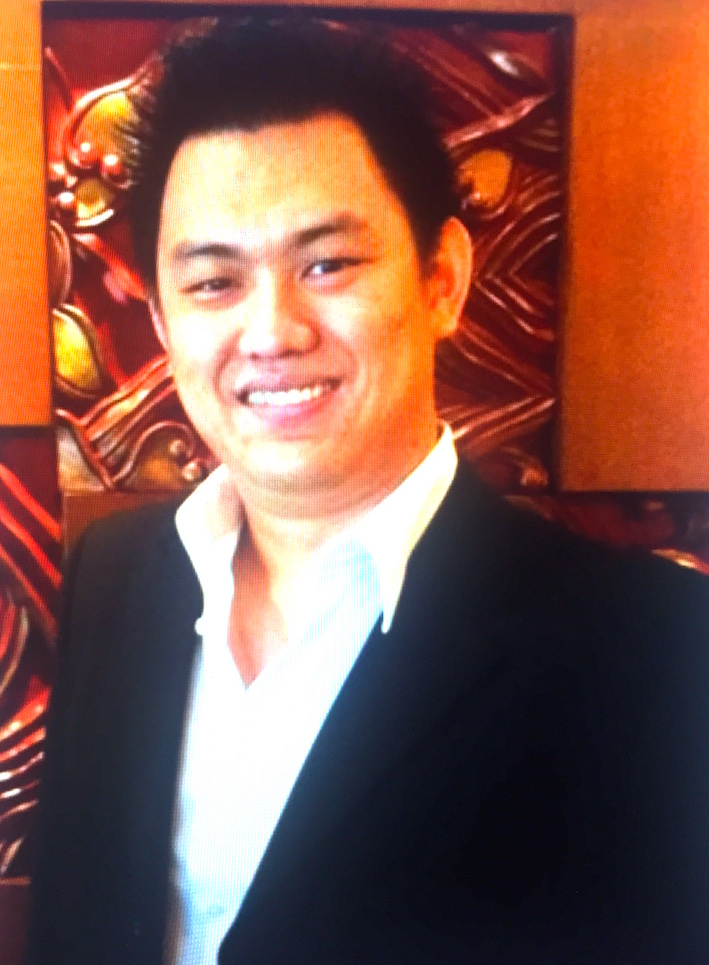
- Born: Tey Por Yee; 2 February 1976 (age 50); Kuala Lumpur, Malaysia
- Occupations: Venture capitalist, founder of nexgram group
- Website: www.nexgram.co

Dato' Larry Tey Por Yee (born 2 February 1976, in Kuala Lumpur) is a Malaysian businessman and venture capitalist.

He is the CEO and founder of Nexgram Group, a conglomerate and investment company in businesses including telecom, property and information technology industries with presence in Malaysia, Indonesia, Thailand and China.

== Early life ==
Tey earned a Bachelor of Commerce degree, majoring in Business Administration and Finance from University of Manitoba. Tey invested in various startup companies in North America and Canada, before returning to Malaysia where he joined a corporate advisory company.

== Business ==
Larry joined business advisory firm Global Capital Limited, in 2008 to focus on investment and merger and acquisition dealings in emerging markets, especially Asia Pacific with special interest in technology, infrastructure and energy companies.

In 2015 Dato' Larry Tey Por Yee joined Gomif Partners, a niche investment network focus on incubating social business startups. Gomif Partners focus on investment in sustainable humanity business ventures, including artificial intelligence, robotics and internet Software as a Service (SaaS) business models.

=== Nexgram Group ===
Dato' Tey Por Yee founded Nexgram Group in 1999. Under his leadership, the company developed businesses that include telecommunication, property development, information technology, infrastructure and manufacturing services. The company also owns and operates one of the largest surveillance and security company in Malaysia known as Sensorlink.

=== Other Investments ===
Larry private investment includes private companies and public listed companies, such as Asdion Bhd, Iretex Bhd, and Wintoni Group Bhd.

== Awards and recognition ==
- In 2013 Focus Malaysia Journal, listed him in the ’40 CEOs under 40’ list.

=== Honours ===
- Pahang
  - Knight Companion of the Order of the Crown of Pahang (DIMP) – Dato' (2014)
