= Chieko Utsumi =

Japanese educator

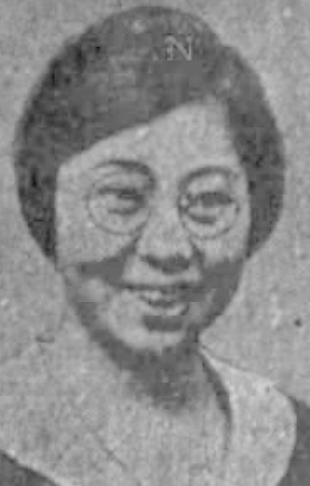
- Chieko Utsumi, from a 1928 newspaper
- Born: 1903; Japan
- Died: after 1976
- Other names: Chie Utsumi
- Occupation: Educator
- Honours: Fourth Class of the Order of the Precious Crown (1976)

Chie Utsumi (1903 – died after 1976), known as Chieko Utsumi, was a Japanese physical educator, trained at Wellesley College. She was recognized for her contributions to women's physical education in 1976, with a Fourth Class of the Order of the Precious Crown from the emperor of Japan.

== Early life and education ==
Utsumi was born in 1903. Her father was a professor at Meiji University, and the school's basketball coach. She graduated from Woman's Christian College of Japan, and attended Wellesley College as a special student beginning in 1928, sponsored by the YWCA. She was still at Wellesley in 1930 to assist at Japanese-themed parties given at Wellesley College and the Cosmopolitan Club, and in spring 1931, when the Prince Takamatsu visited the school, and she presented a bouquet to Princess Takamatsu. She was awarded a certificate in hygiene and special education from Wellesley in June 1931.

== Career ==
After returning to Japan in the 1930s, Utsumi taught physical education and was director of the Physical Education and Recreation department at Tokyo Women's Christian University. She served on committees of the Ministry of Education during the 1940s and 1950s.

In 1950 and 1951, Utsumi and Olympic swim coach Torahiko Miyahata toured and studied women's physical education programs in the United States, including stops in Cleveland, Detroit, St. Louis, Iowa City, and at Stanford University. In 1951, she published a Japanese translation of the rules of women's basketball, as established by the National Section on Women's Athletics (NSWA), in hopes of popularizing the sport. She was recognized for her contributions to women's physical education in 1976, with a Fourth Class of the Order of the Precious Crown from the emperor of Japan.
