= Chie Aoki =

Japanese sculptor

Chie Aoki (青木千絵, born 1981) is a Japanese sculptor. Her sculpture work uses mediums of cloth, foam, lacquer, and she is also known for photography on rice paper. Her sculptures commonly have the shapes of amorphous human bodies, without heads or faces.

== Life ==
Aoki was born in 1981 in Gifu Prefecture, Japan. Her father was the curator of the Toyota Municipal Museum of Art and introduced her to Alberto Giacometti's sculptures, which depict existential struggles. She received a degree in arts and crafts from the Kanazawa College of Art in 2005, and completed graduate work in 2006. She has two daughters.

== Works and themes ==
Aoki's works are surreal and convey the idea of metamorphosis or transformation. Her sculptures often start as carved styrofoam blocks over which Aoki layers black lacquer, which is then polished.

Aoki's work is influenced by psychological themes seen in Edvard Munch's art.

== Collections ==
Aoki's works have been featured in the following collections and galleries:

- 21st Century Museum of Contemporary Art, Kanazawa
- CONTEXT Art Miami
- Hyōgo Prefectural Museum of Art
- Kitakata City Art Museum
- LIXIL Gallery
- Minneapolis Institute of Art
- Sokyo Gallery
- Tama Art University
