= Tey, Iran =

Village in Lorestan, Iran

Tey تي
- Village
- Location within Iran
- Coordinates: 33°18′38″N 49°04′53″E
- Country: Iran
- Province: Lorestan
- County: Dorud
- Bakhsh: Central
- Rural District: Dorud

Population (2006)
  - Total: 181
- Time zone: UTC+3:30 (IRST)
  - Summer (DST): UTC+4:30 (IRDT)

Tey (Persian: تي, also Romanized as Ţey; also known as Tappeh Tey and Tappeh Tī) is a village in Dorud Rural District, in the Central District of Dorud County, Lorestan Province, Iran. At the 2006 census, its population was 181, in 29 families.
