= Tie Feiyan =

Chinese politician

Tie Feiyan (Chinese: 铁飞燕; pinyin: Tiě Fēiyàn, born 1992) is a politician in the People's Republic of China.

Tie was a member of the 12th National People's Congress.
