= Chie Ikeya =

Chie Ikeya is a historian of Southeast Asia. She is Associate Professor of Asian and women's and gender history in the Department of History at Rutgers University.

Ikeya's first book – a monograph on 'women, colonialism and modernity' in colonial Burma – was well-received. One reviewer called it "one of the most important books on colonial Burma to have emerged in the last century". Other reviewers called it a "social historical masterpiece", a "wonderful book", a "sophisticated, nuanced work", and an "excellent book". Another reviewer, despite specific criticisms, welcomed "an important and distinctive contribution [...] original, lucid and well researched".

== Books ==
- Refiguring women, colonialism, and modernity in Burma. Honolulu: University of Hawaiʻi Press, 2011.
- (ed. with Lyn Parker and Laura Dales) Contestations Over Gender in Asia. Routledge, 2017. ISBN 9781138061675
