= Chie Matsui =

Japanese visual artist

- Born: 1960 (age 65–66); Osaka, Japan
- Education: Kyoto University of Arts
- Style: Installation, video work, and painting
- Website: https://www.chie-matsui.com

Chie Matsui is a Japanese artist born in Osaka in 1960. She works in various mediums, including drawings, paintings, video works, sculptures, and photographs. These various mediums are incorporated into her installations. Her works have been featured in domestic solo and group exhibitions in Japan and internationally, including at the Venice Biennale Aperto section in 1990 and at the MoMA in New York City.

== Early life ==
Matsui was the daughter of a Buddhist temple family and grew up doing traditional Japanese calligraphy. Her father was an ethics and world history high school teacher. In an interview for her alma mater, Matsui notes that she had a weak constitution when she was in elementary school and spent a lot of time at home reading and drawing images inspired from manga that she enjoyed while listening to the sounds of the lumbermill that was in her neighborhood. She said that as an elementary school student her parents would often take her to the Osaka Museum of Fine Arts which was near her home.

Matsui also played piano as a child and listened to a lot of classical music that her father often listened to such as Tchaikovsky, Dvořák, and Liszt. She says that art and music were a synergistic influence in her formative years.

She completed her MFA in Textiles from the Kyoto City University of Arts in 1984 studying dyeing in the Department of Crafts. These formative experiences in traditional calligraphic art and her subsequent shift to textile design, which emphasizes structure over content, ultimately inform and influence Matsui's later works in significant ways.

== Early career with installations ==
While in University she began to show her works in solo and group exhibitions in the Kansai area and began to create installations using various materials such as plaster, sand, tree branches, fur, and photographs. These installations included various elements such as sculptures, objects, drawings, paintings, and photos are composed together without restriction with special attention to the unique qualities of each medium and material.

From the late 1980s to the 1990s, her works evolved into large-scale installations. She was often heavily involved in the creation of her exhibition spaces, sometimes constructing walls, compartments, corridors, and stairs with bricks in her site-specific mixed media installations.

She gained recognition as an installation artist. In the brochure of the exhibition What is the real Nature of Being? at the Ashiya City Museum of Art & History, curator Mizuo Kato notes that, “in Matsui’s pre-2000 installations, objects with a variety of textures were distributed around a space, and in order to suggest subtle connections between them, it was necessary for the viewer to walk around, attempt to link fragments of meaning and feel their way around to grasp the overall image. These works were not only visual, they required the viewer to experience them with all their senses...perceiving with the entire body."

== International reception ==
While in the early stage of her career, Matsui's installations consisted of various elements, but into the late 1980s, one can discern a trend of abstraction in her works. In her installation piece for the Aperto Section of the 44th Venice Biennale, Channel - With the Speed of Her Mind, Matsui covered the floors and walls of the exhibition space with lead tiles. In the middle of this space, she constructed a large white cube that had a hexagonal window that resembled a kaleidoscope. Around the perimeter of the lead tiled walls, she created thin and long plaster gutters that contained pieces of glass inside of them. In front of the white cube was a column of stacked hexagonal glass glued together and the floor was littered with fallen blue strings that she had tied to the steel equipment on the ceiling.

In 1997, Matsui was included in a two-person exhibition at the Museum of Modern Art in New York City with fellow East Asian installation artist Bul Lee. Barbara London, associate curator of the museum's Department of Film and Video at the time of their exhibition, notes that installation art “recently emerged as a major avant-garde movement in Korea and Japan. It is the medium of choice for young artists who wish to break with institutionalized art forms prevalent in museums and gallery spaces… Women artists find installation especially attractive. It’s contemporary; no fossilized tradition sets its boundaries. No hierarchy, male or otherwise, dictates the rules of installation. Artists are free to use whatever materials they wish… In Japan and Korea, where social norms are narrowly defined, this freedom is liberating.” Matsui points a spotlight to the struggles that face women in Japanese society by including a sanmenkyo, a Japanese three-part folding vanity mirror, in her installation Labor, exhibited at MoMA, “an interface between a woman’s private persona and the restrained face she carefully arranges for public appearance.”

== Later career, shift to video works ==
From the 2000s, her primary medium shifted to video works, notably her Heidi series. But she was still committed to installations and also adding performative elements to her works.

Tadashi Kawamata was tasked with organizing the 2005 Yokohama Trienniale. He titled the international contemporary art exhibition Art Circus and included numerous participatory art works. For the Triennale, Matsui created five one-person pavilions with tented roofs of lavender organza held up with wires and wooden walls. The site-specific installation, titled An Allegorial Vessels – Rose, was like a small village amidst the various other works of the Triennale. In each pavilion, Matsui showed a different video work. In her reportage of the Triennale Janet Polos wrote in Art in America that “the scenes are sexual yet often emotionally vacant.” Her participation in the 2005 Yokohama Trienniale exemplifies her continued commitment to site-specific installations and her growing interest in video works.

Recently, Matsui has also incorporated more drawings into her artistic production. Her Ms. Piece series, in which she made one drawing each day, was featured in the 2014 Yokohama Trinnale.

Her works have been shown domestically in Japan and internationally. Her works were featured in the Venice Biennale Aperto section in 1990. Other notable exhibitions include Art in Japan Today: 1985-1995 held at the Museum of Contemporary Art, Tokyo in 1995. Yokohama 2005: International Triennale of Contemporary Art in 2005.

== Collections ==
Matsui's work is held in the permanent collection of the Tochigi Prefectural Museum of Fine Arts, the Museum of Contemporary Art Tokyo, the National Museum of Art, Osaka, among other venues.
