= Japan National Route 8 =

National highway in Japan

National Route 8
- 国道8号

Route information
- Length: 574.1 km (356.7 mi)
- Existed: 1952–present

Major junctions
- North end: National Route 7 / National Route 17 / National Route 49 / National Route 113 / National Route 116 in Niigata
- South end: National Route 1 / National Route 9 / National Route 24 / National Route 367 in Kyoto

Location
- Country: Japan

Highway system
- National highways of Japan; Expressways of Japan
← National Route 7	→ National Route 9

National Route 8 (国道8号, Kokudō hachi-gō) is a major highway in the Hokuriku and Kansai regions of central Japan. The 574.1-kilometer (356.7 mi) highway begins at an intersection with National Routes 7, 17, 49, 113, and 116 in Chūō-ku, Niigata. It travels southwest across central Honshu, connecting the prefecture capitals: Toyama, Kanazawa, Fukui, and Ōtsu. In Kyoto it travels concurrently with National Route 1 toward its endpoint at an intersection with National Routes 9, 24, and 367 in Shimogyō-ku, Kyoto.

== Route description ==
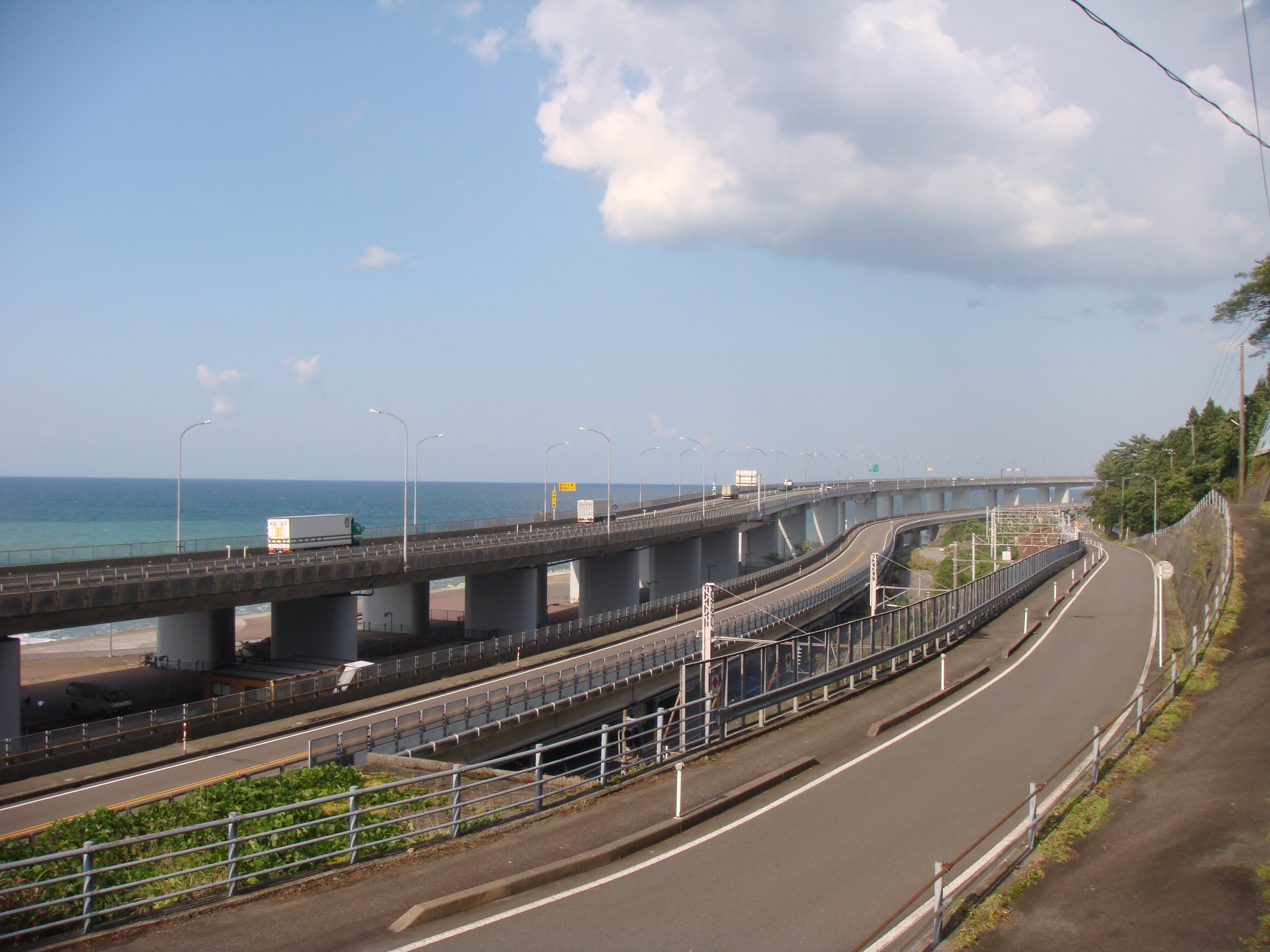
Oyashirazu, Itoigawa, Niigata Prefecture Left:Hokuriku Expressway Center:National Route 8 and JR Hokuriku Main Line Right: Niigata Prefecture Route 525

- Length: 574.1 km (356.7 mi)
- Origin: Chūō-ku, Niigata (originates at junction with Routes 7, 17, 49, 113 and 116)
- Terminus: Shimogyō-ku, Kyoto (ends at Junction with Routes 9, 24 and 367)
- Major cities: Sanjō, Nagaoka, Kashiwazaki, Joetsu, Itoigawa, Toyama, Takaoka, Kanazawa, Hakusan, Komatsu, Fukui, Tsuruga, Maibara, Hikone, Ōtsu

== History ==
The origins of the road that is now National Route 8 can be traced back to the Hokurikudō, a road that was established after the Taika Reform to link Kyoto to the capitals of the region by that went by the same name.

The modern history of the highway saw its establishment by the Cabinet of Japan on 4 December 1952 as First Class National Highway 8 from Niigata to Kyoto. On 1 April 1965 it was re-designated as General National Highway 8. On 7–9 February 2018, heavy snowfall shut down the highway for over 60 hours in Fukui Prefecture before it could be removed.

== Intersecting routes ==
- in Niigata Prefecture
  - Routes 7, 17, 18, 49, 113, 116, 148, 252, 253, 292, 350, 351, 352, 353, 403 and 460
- in Toyama Prefecture
  - Routes 41, 156, 160, 415, 470, 471 and 472
- in Ishikawa Prefecture
  - Routes 157, 159, 305, 360, 364 and 416
- in Fukui Prefecture
  - Routes 27, 158, 161, 305, 365, 416, 417 and 476
- in Shiga Prefecture
  - Routes 1, 21, 161, 303, 305, 306, 365, 421, 422 and 477
- in Kyoto Prefecture
  - Routes 9, 24 and 367

== In popular culture ==
National Route 8 is the namesake of Hachi-ban Ramen, a chain of ramen shops in the Hokuriku region.

== Gallery ==
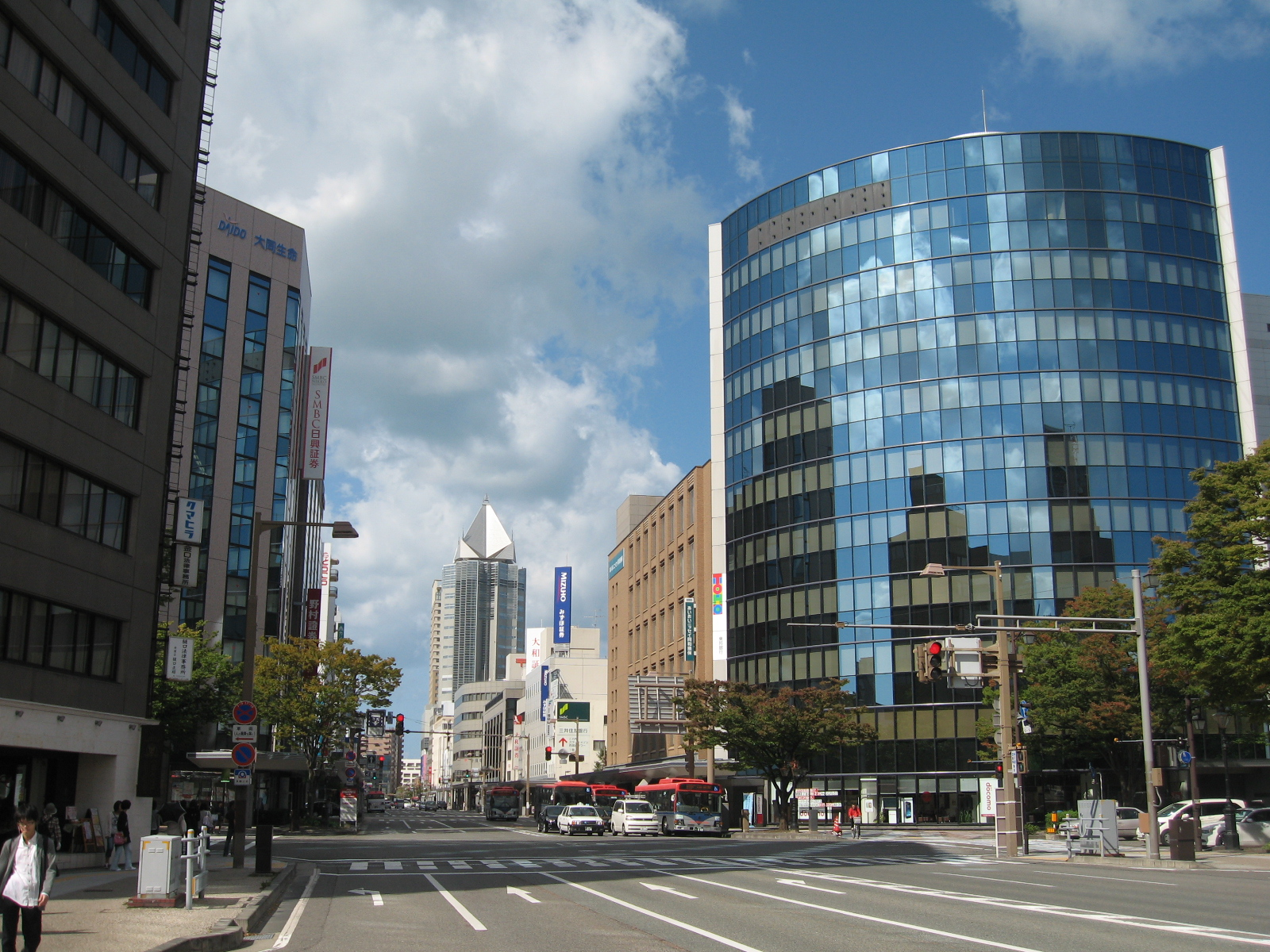
Masaya-koji Street, near the origin of Route 8 in Niigata City

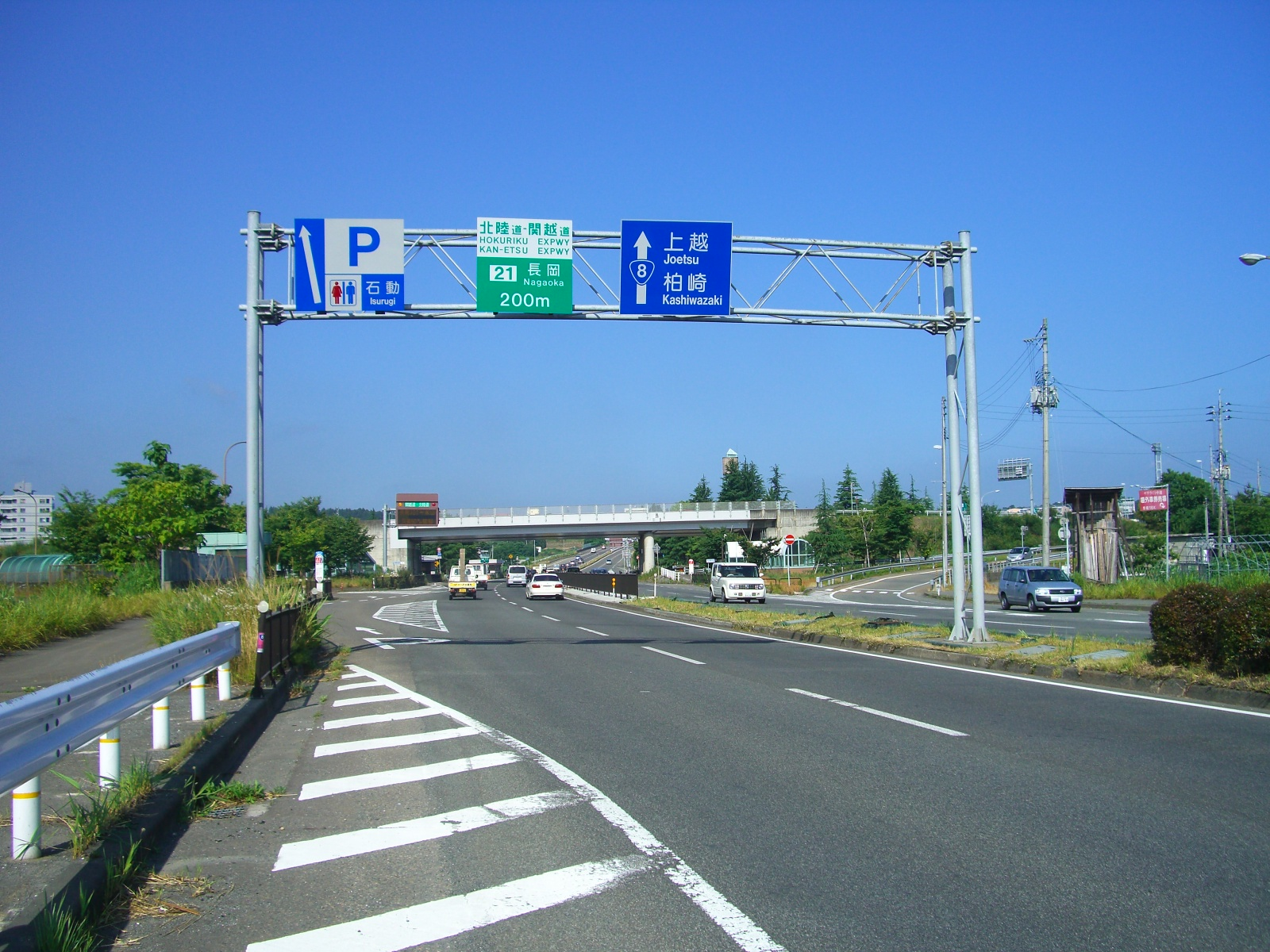
Nagaoka Bypass in Nagaoka, Niigata Prefecture

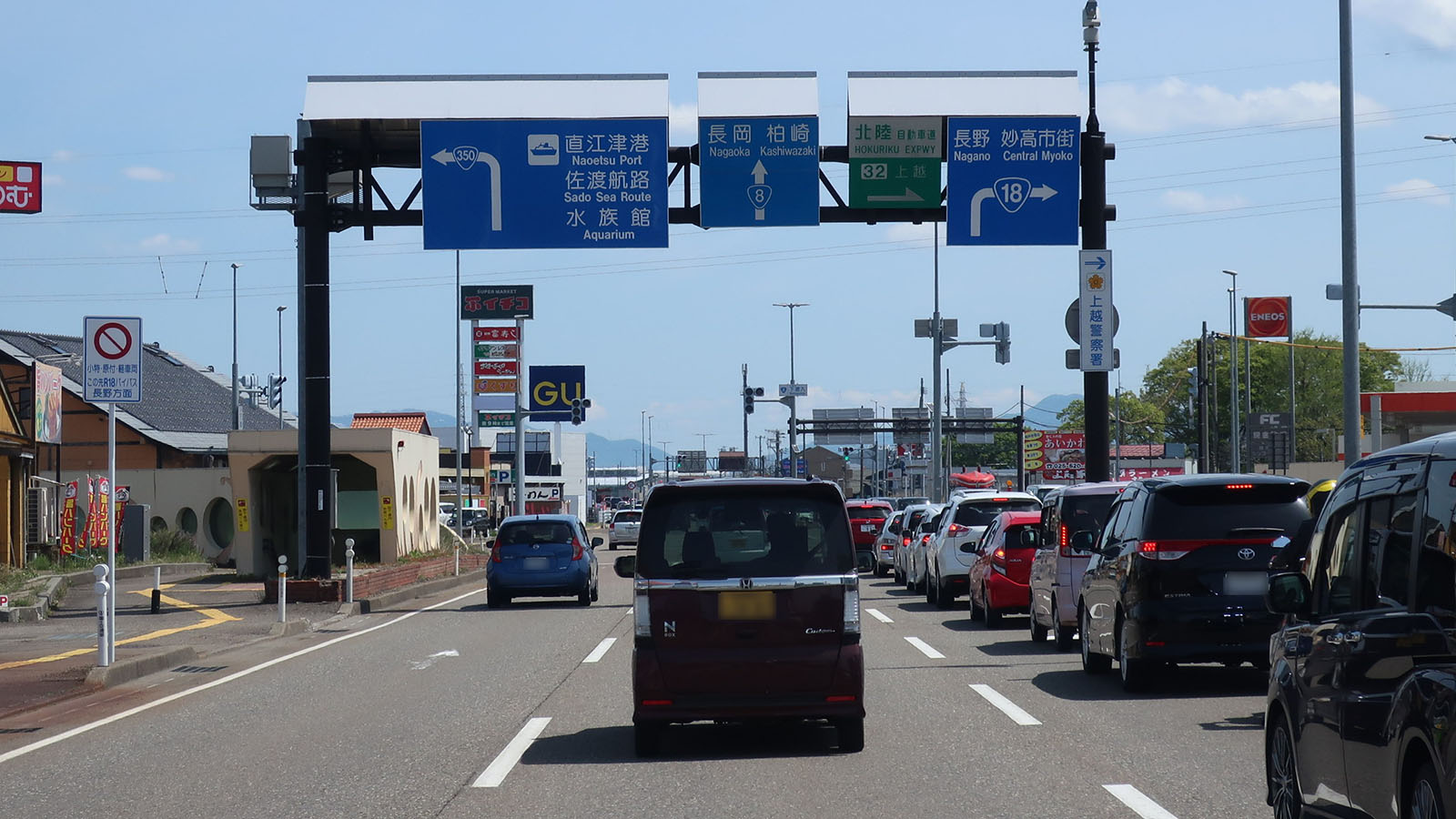
Route 8 in Joetsu, Niigata Prefecture

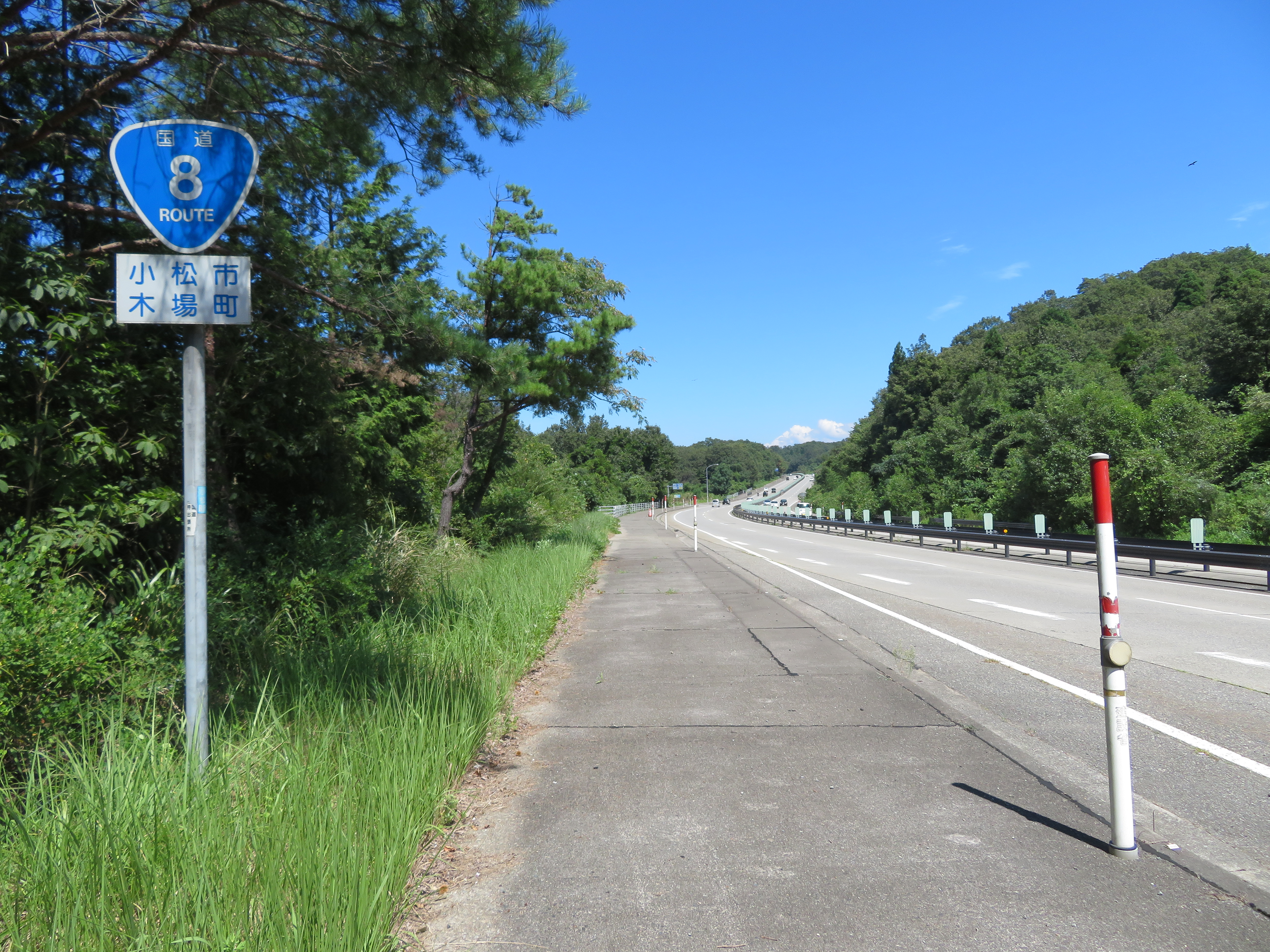
Route 8 in Komatsu, Ishikawa

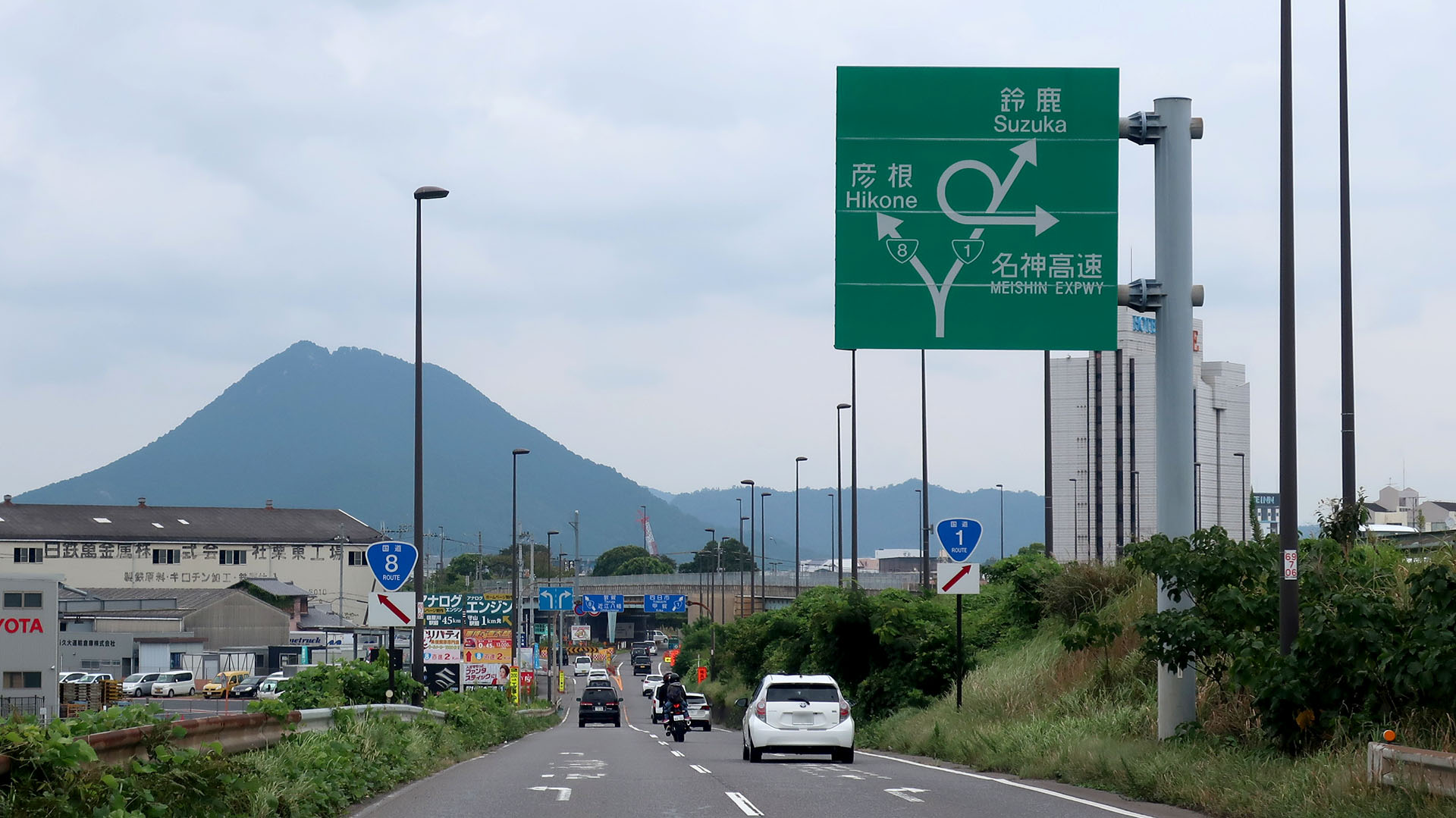
Route 1 and Route 8 in Rittō, Shiga Prefecture
