= Japan National Route 9 =

National highway in Japan

National Route 9
- 国道9号

Route information
- Length: 638.4 km (396.7 mi)
- Existed: 4 December 1952–present

Major junctions
- West end: National Route 191 in Shimonoseki
- East end: National Route 1 / National Route 8 / National Route 24 / National Route 367 in Shimogyō-ku, Kyoto

Location
- Country: Japan

Highway system
- National highways of Japan; Expressways of Japan
← National Route 8	→ National Route 10

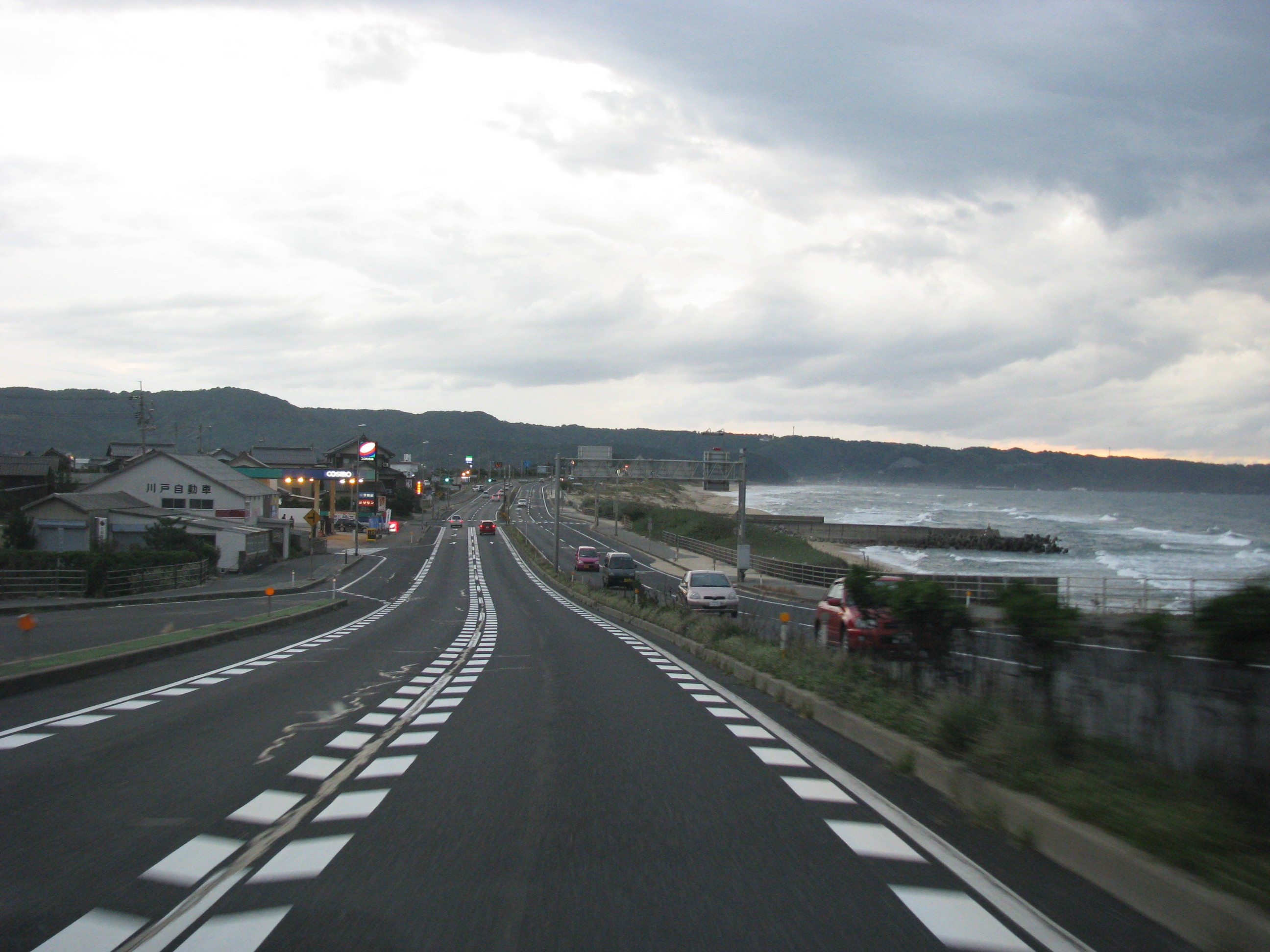
Route 9 on the Sea of Japan shore in Tottori

National Route 9 (国道9号, Kokudō kyū-gō) is an important highway in the Kansai and Chūgoku regions. It connects the prefectural capitals of Kyoto, Tottori, Matsue (Shimane Prefecture), and Yamaguchi. Other significant cities along the route include Yonago, Tottori and Shimonoseki. National Route 9 also passes through parts of Hyōgo Prefecture.

With a total length of 638.4 kilometers (396.7 mi), National Route 9 is the second longest national highway in Japan, being shorter than only National Route 4.

== Route data ==
- Length: 638.4 kilometers (396.7 mi)
- Origin: Shimogyō-ku, Kyoto (originates at junction with Routes 1, 8, 24 and 367)
- Terminus: Shimonoseki (ends at junction with Route 191)
- Major cities: Fukuchiyama, Tottori, Yonago, Matsue, Hamada, Yamaguchi

== History ==
Route 9 follows the old Sanindō, an ancient highway along a similar route.

- 4 December 1952 - First Class National Highway 9 (from Kyoto to Shimonoseki)
- 1 April 1965 - General National Highway 9 (from Kyoto to Shimonoseki)

== See also ==
- Gokishichidō, the ancient highways of Japan
