= Suujin =

District of Kyoto, Japan

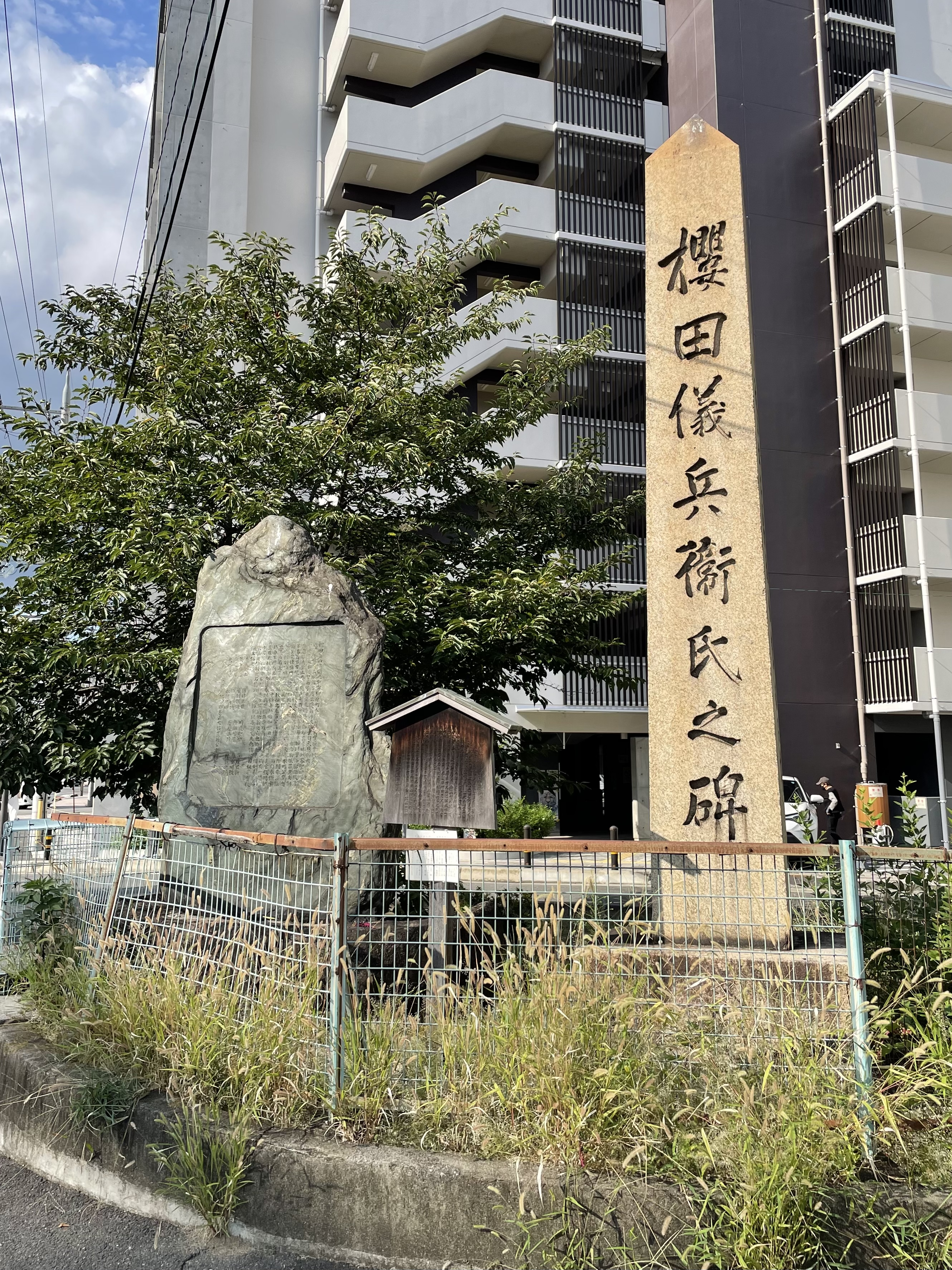
Monument to Gihē Sakurada (桜田儀兵衛氏之碑)

Suujin (Sūjin、also Suujin-chiku 崇仁地区) is a small district in Kyoto near Kyoto Station known for its elderly population that has been ethnically discriminated against due to burakumin or zainichi status.

Despite many years as a slum district, the relocation of the Kyoto City University of Arts is helping the area be rehabilitated.

== Etymology ==
The name of the district comes from "Sūjinbō," (崇仁坊) a Chinese temple name in Chang'an. The name was given to the district during the historic period when Kyoto was known as Heian-kyō.

== Demographics ==
According to the 2020 census, the area of 27.4 hectares has a population of 1,380. The average age is 53.9 years old, and 38.55 percent of the population is 65 years old or older, indicating an aging population.

Suujin was a district where many people who had been discriminated against, especially people with occupations that offended Buddhist sensitivities related to death such as executioners, gravediggers, slaughterhouse workers, butchers, and tanners— along with Korean residents.

== History ==
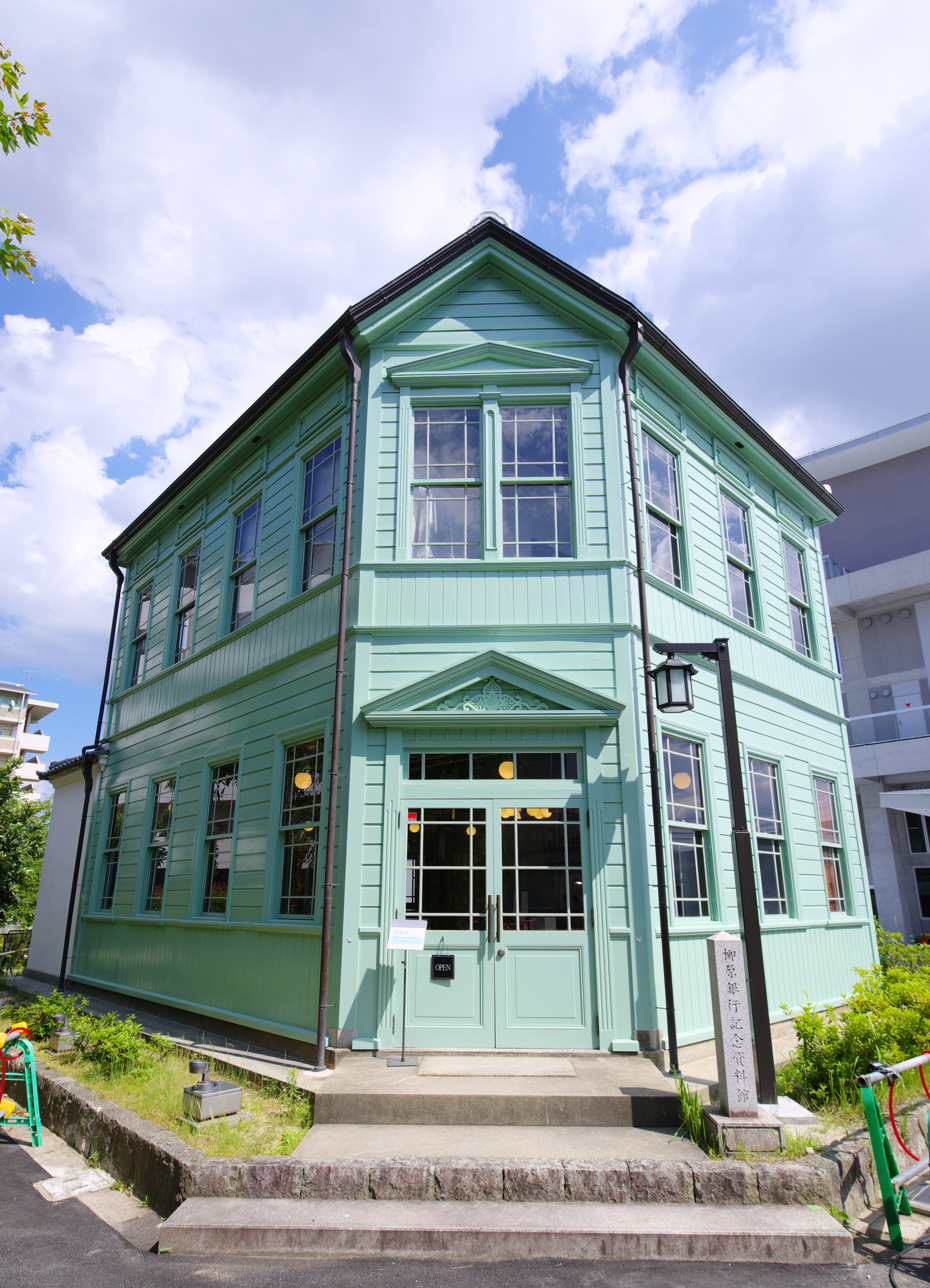
Yanagihara Bank Memorial Museum (柳原銀行記念資料館)

In the first half of the 16th century, Rokujo-gawara became an execution ground. From 1698 to 1709, permission to mint coins was granted. The site of the copper mint was left abandoned for a long time because it was full of copper and unsuitable for agricultural cultivation.

Yanagihara Bank was a private bank established in Yanagihara-cho, Kyoto Prefecture (now Shimogyō-ku, Kyoto) during the Meiji period. It was the only bank in Japan established by residents of burakumin communities, and had many clients including leather manufacturers.

Shimogyo Ikiiki Civic Center -formerly Sujin Community Center— was established in 1920 as a local initiative to provide relief to the poor.

Since the Meiji period, the burakumin of Shichijo, moved into the Higashikujo area, which was previously farmland. Following them, people who came to Japan voluntarily or involuntarily from the Korean Peninsula, against the backdrop of the annexation of Korea, began to live in the surrounding area. Higashikujo became a residential area known for zainichi Koreans, and there are many Korean restaurants.

For a long time, the relationship between burakumin and Koreans in Japan was not good, but in recent years, places for interaction between Japanese and Koreans in Japan have been created, such as the "Higashikujo Madan" (Madang 마당 means square in Korean), which has been held since 1993. Higashikujo Madang has been held in Higashikujo, Minami Ward, where there are many Koreans in Japan, but in 2018, the 26th event, it was held for the first time outside Higashikujo at the former Sujin Elementary School in Shimogyō-ku.

== In popular culture ==
In the 2005 Japanese film Pacchigi!, the setting is the area where sisters Lee An-seong and Kyung-ja live, and the area appears frequently in the film.
