= Kyoto Freight Terminal =

Railway freight station in Kyoto, Japan

Coordinates: 34°59′07″N 135°44′29″E

Kyoto Freight Terminal 京都貨物駅
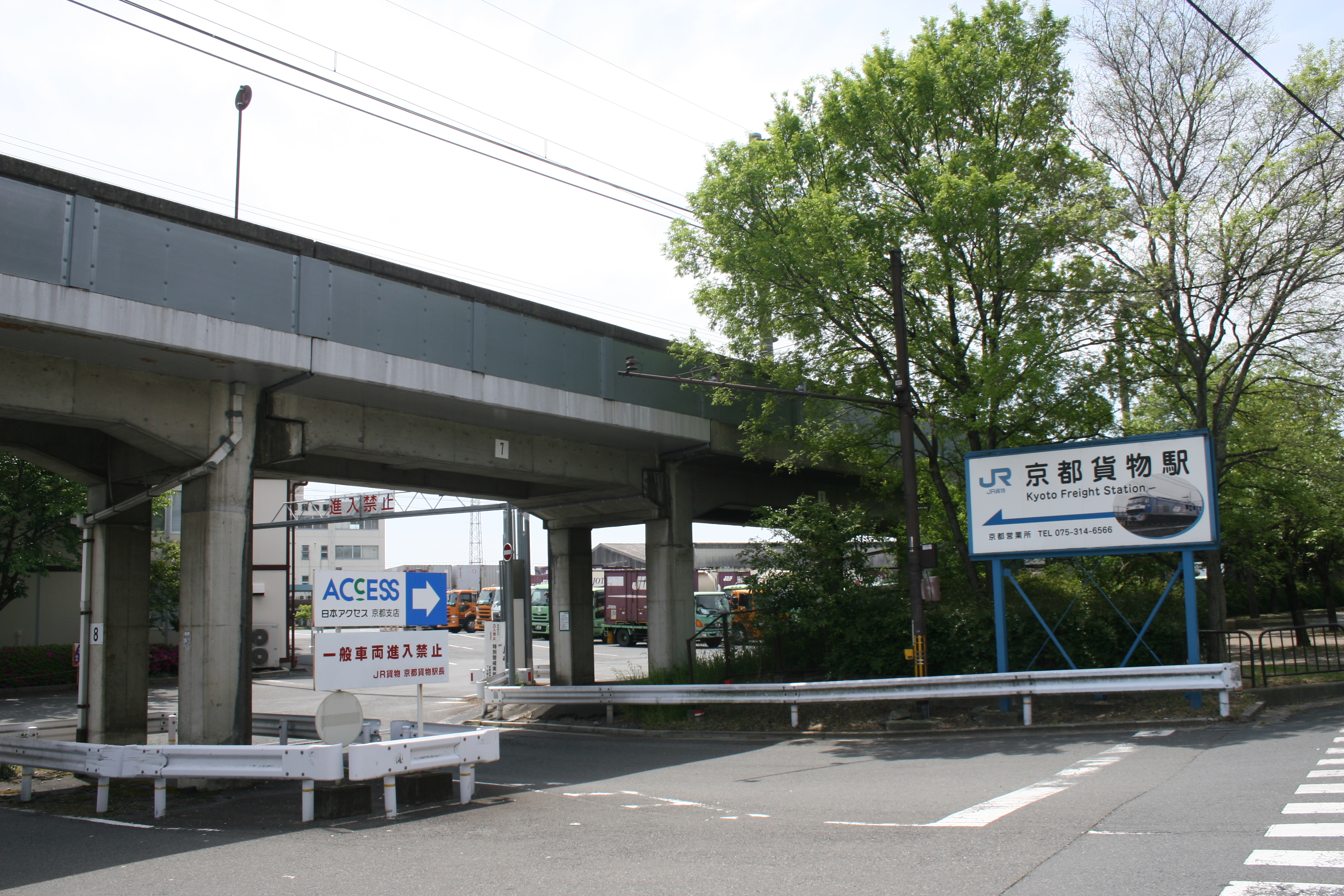
- Gate of the freight terminal

General information
- Location: Shimogyō, Kyoto, Kyoto; Japan
- Operator: Japan Freight Railway Company

History
- Opened: 1913
- Former names: Umekōji (until 2011)
Location

Kyoto Freight Terminal (京都貨物駅, Kyōto Kamotsu-eki) is a railway freight terminal operated by Japan Freight Railway Company (JR Freight) on the Tōkaidō Main Line in Shimogyō-ku, Kyoto, Japan.

The terminal opened on June 21, 1913 as Umekōji Freight Terminal (梅小路駅, Umekōji-eki), dividing the freight service at Kyōto Station to the new facilities west of the station. It was located in the ground east of the track of the San'in Main Line, where now Umekōji Park occupies, until it was moved westward to the present site on March 12, 1990. The name of the freight terminal was changed to the present one on March 12, 2011.

Kyoto Freight Terminal is capable to handle containers of up to 30 ft.
