= Kaga, Ishikawa =

Kaga 加賀市
- City
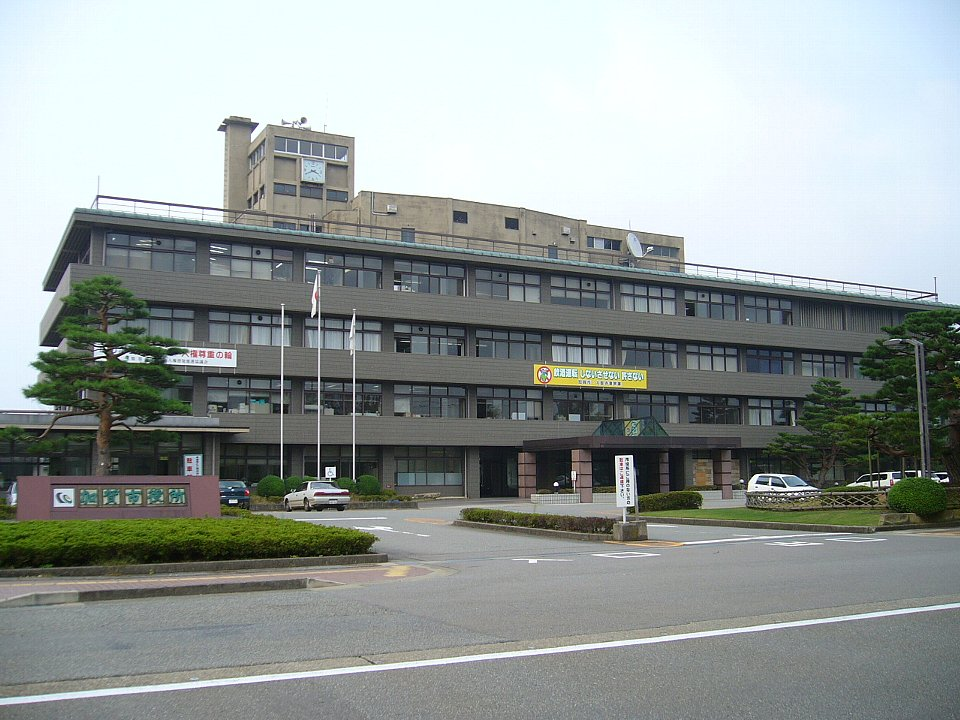
- Kaga City Hall

- Flag Emblem

- Location of Kaga in Ishikawa Prefecture

- Coordinates: 36°18′10″N 136°18′54.1″E
- Country: Japan
- Region: Chūbu (Hokuriku)
- Prefecture: Ishikawa Prefecture

Government
  - Mayor: Toshiaki Yamada（山田利明）- from October 2025

Area
  - Total: 305.87 km^{2} (118.10 sq mi)

Population (March 1, 2018)
  - Total: 67,793
  - Density: 221.64/km^{2} (574.04/sq mi)
- Time zone: UTC+9 (Japan Standard Time)
- Phone number: 0761-72-1111
- Address: 2–41 Minami-chō, Daishōji, Kaga-shi, Ishikawa-ken; 922-8622
- Climate: Cfa
- Website: Official website
- Symbols
- Bird: Duck
- Flower: Iris
- Tree: Pine

Kaga (加賀市, Kaga-shi; Japanese pronunciation: [kä́.ɡä̀, -ŋä̀, kä̀.ɡä́.ɕì, -ŋä́-]) is a city located in southwestern Ishikawa Prefecture, Japan. As of 1 March 2018, the city had an estimated population of 67,793 in 29054 households, and a population density of 290 persons per km^{2}. The total area of the city was 305.87 square kilometres (118.10 sq mi).

== Geography ==
Kaga is located in the extreme southwestern corner of Ishikawa Prefecture in the Hokuriku region of Japan and is bordered by the Sea of Japan to the west and Fukui Prefecture to the south. Parts of the coastal areas of the city are within the borders of the Echizen-Kaga Kaigan Quasi-National Park.

=== Neighbouring municipalities ===
- Fukui Prefecture
  - Awara
  - Katsuyama
  - Sakai
- Ishikawa Prefecture
  - Komatsu

=== Climate ===
Kaga has a humid subtropical climate (Köppen Cfa) characterized by mild summers and cold winters with heavy snowfall. The average annual temperature in Kaga is 14.2 °C. The average annual rainfall is 2499 mm with September as the wettest month. The temperatures are highest on average in August, at around 26.8 °C, and lowest in January, at around 2.8 °C.

Climate data for Kaga (1991−2020 normals, extremes 1978−present)
Month	Jan	Feb	Mar	Apr	May	Jun	Jul	Aug	Sep	Oct	Nov	Dec	Year
Record high °C (°F)	18.2 (64.8)	19.7 (67.5)	26.3 (79.3)	29.8 (85.6)	33.9 (93.0)	34.1 (93.4)	37.4 (99.3)	37.6 (99.7)	35.6 (96.1)	30.4 (86.7)	25.6 (78.1)	23.1 (73.6)	37.4 (99.3)
Mean daily maximum °C (°F)	5.5 (41.9)	6.4 (43.5)	10.9 (51.6)	17.4 (63.3)	22.5 (72.5)	25.5 (77.9)	29.2 (84.6)	30.8 (87.4)	26.4 (79.5)	20.9 (69.6)	15.0 (59.0)	8.7 (47.7)	18.3 (64.9)
Daily mean °C (°F)	1.9 (35.4)	2.2 (36.0)	5.5 (41.9)	11.3 (52.3)	16.4 (61.5)	20.2 (68.4)	24.3 (75.7)	25.4 (77.7)	21.2 (70.2)	15.4 (59.7)	9.8 (49.6)	4.6 (40.3)	13.2 (55.7)
Mean daily minimum °C (°F)	−0.7 (30.7)	−1.1 (30.0)	1.0 (33.8)	5.8 (42.4)	10.9 (51.6)	15.9 (60.6)	20.6 (69.1)	21.4 (70.5)	17.4 (63.3)	11.4 (52.5)	5.8 (42.4)	1.4 (34.5)	9.2 (48.4)
Record low °C (°F)	−8.0 (17.6)	−7.7 (18.1)	−4.8 (23.4)	−2.3 (27.9)	1.9 (35.4)	7.4 (45.3)	13.3 (55.9)	13.6 (56.5)	7.9 (46.2)	2.0 (35.6)	−1.0 (30.2)	−5.7 (21.7)	−8.0 (17.6)
Average precipitation mm (inches)	375.3 (14.78)	223.2 (8.79)	221.0 (8.70)	177.9 (7.00)	179.3 (7.06)	202.5 (7.97)	296.3 (11.67)	214.6 (8.45)	275.8 (10.86)	222.2 (8.75)	286.2 (11.27)	411.3 (16.19)	3,085.5 (121.48)
Average snowfall cm (inches)	192 (76)	159 (63)	48 (19)	1 (0.4)	0 (0)	0 (0)	0 (0)	0 (0)	0 (0)	0 (0)	0 (0)	68 (27)	467 (184)
Average rainy days (≥ 1.0 mm)	24.5	19.7	17.3	12.9	11.8	11.9	13.7	10.6	12.9	13.8	17.6	23.8	190.5
Average snowy days (≥ 3 cm)	17.1	15.7	5.3	0.2	0	0	0	0	0	0	0.1	6.8	45.2
Mean monthly sunshine hours	52.4	74.7	125.9	177.5	199.7	139.8	152.2	196.8	133.6	134.1	101.7	58.8	1,547.1
Source: Japan Meteorological Agency

== Demographics ==
Per Japanese census data, the population of Kaga peaked around 1990 and has declined since.

Historical population
Year	Pop.	±%
1970	69,664	—
1980	77,335	+11.0%
1990	80,714	+4.4%
2000	79,653	−1.3%
2010	71,887	−9.7%
2020	63,220	−12.1%

== History ==
The area around Kaga was part of ancient Kaga Province. The area became part Daishōji Domain under the Edo period Tokugawa shogunate. Following the Meiji restoration, the area was organised into Enuma District, Ishikawa. The town of Daishōji was established with the creation of the modern municipalities system on April 1, 1889. On January 1, 1958, Daishōji merged with the towns of Yamashiro, Katayamazu, Iburihashi, Hashitate and the villages of Miki, Mitani, Nangō and Shioya (all from Enuma District) to form the city of Kaga. the city expanded on October 1, 2005 through a merger with the town of Yamanaka (from Enuma District).

== Government ==
Kaga has a mayor-council form of government with a directly elected mayor and a unicameral city legislature of 18 members.

== Economy ==
Kaga was traditionally known for its production of Kutani ware ceramics and a type of silk fabric known as Kaga habutae. It is also an important tourist city with a number of temples and hot-springs.

== Education ==
Kaga has 21 public elementary schools and seven middle schools operated by the city government, and four public high schools operated by the Ishikawa Prefectural Board of Education. The prefecture also operates a special education school.

== Transportation ==
=== Railway ===
The Hokuriku Shinkansen took over as the primary railway service in Kaga effective March 16, 2024.

Hokuriku Shinkansen

- Kagaonsen

IR Ishikawa Railway

- Daishōji – Kagaonsen – Iburihashi

=== Highway ===
- Hokuriku Expressway

National Route 8
National Route 305
National Route 364
National Route 365

== Local attractions ==
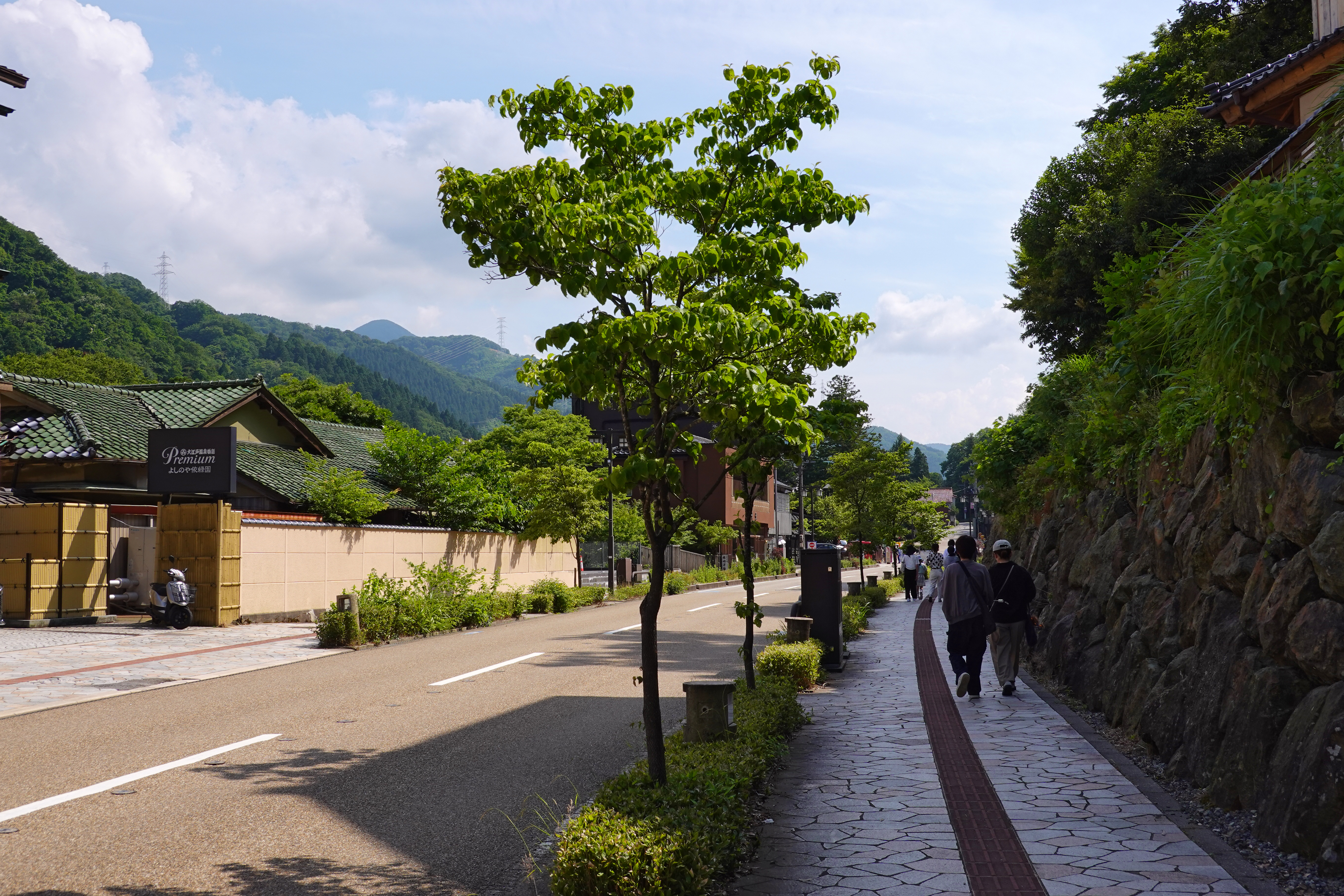
Yamanaka Onsen Yuge street

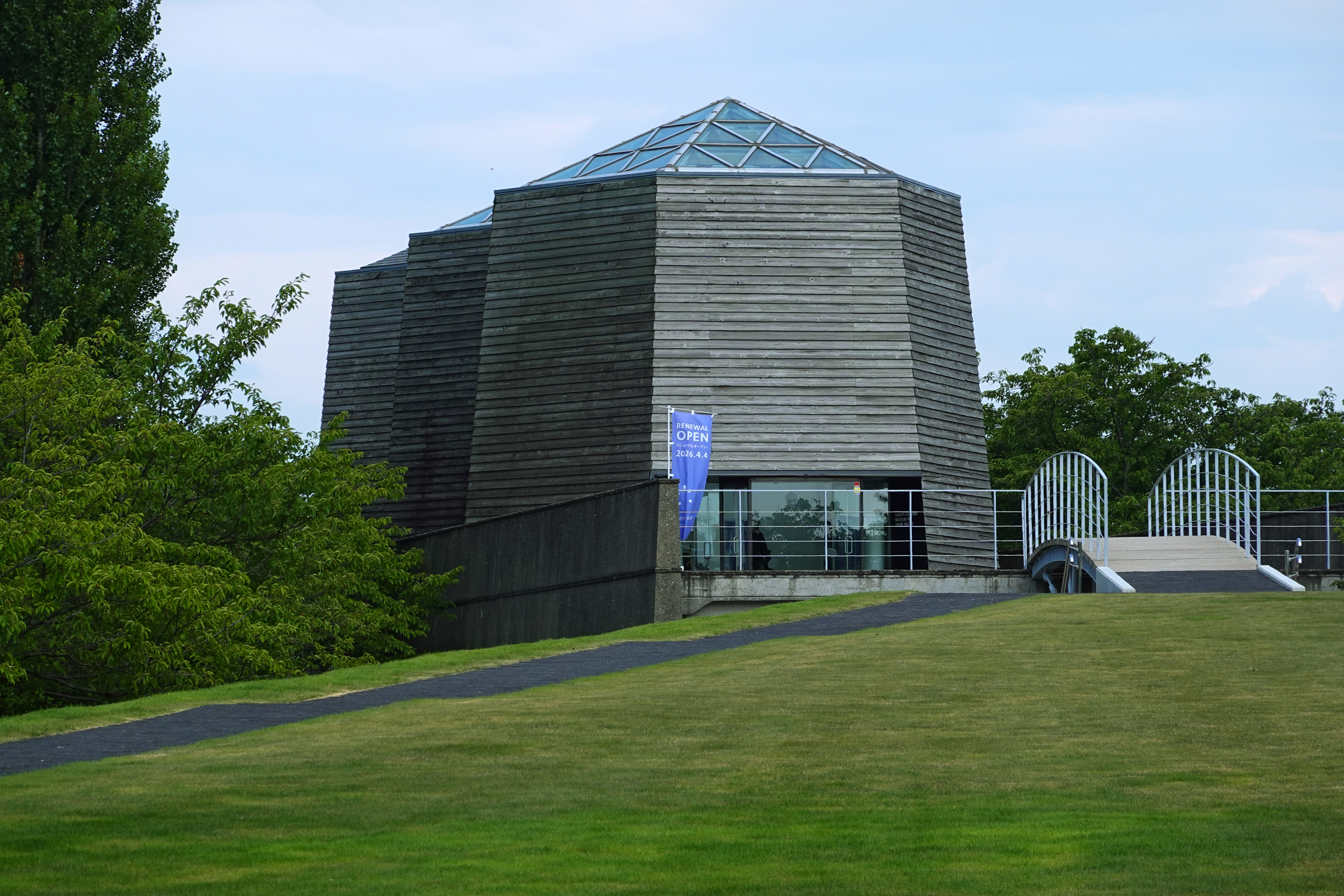
Nakaya Ukichiro Museum of Snow and Ice

- Yamanaka Onsen
  - Great sugi of Kayano
- Yamashiro Onsen
- Kaga-hashidate - Important Preservation Districts for Groups of Traditional Buildings
- Kutaniyaki Art Museum
- Nakaya Ukichiro Museum of Snow and Ice - Designed by Arata Isozaki

== Sister cities ==
- Birštonas, Lithuania, friendship city
- Hamilton, Canada, since 1968
- Tainan, Taiwan, friendship city
- Zahlé, Lebanon, agreement city
- Haapsalu, Estonia, friendship city

== Notable people ==
- Rokusaburo Michiba, Japanese cuisine chef, known as the first Japanese Iron Chef of television series Iron Chef
- Yamada Sōbi, metallurgic artist
- Shoji Tabuchi (1944–2023), fiddler and entertainer in Branson, Missouri
- Masanobu Tsuji, war criminal, army officer and politician.
