= Yamada Sōbi =

Japanese metallurgic artist (1871–1916)

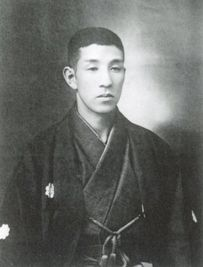
Yamada Sōbi

Yamada Sōbi (山田宗美) (December 23, 1871 – March 15, 1916) was a Japanese metallurgic artist.

== Biography ==
He was born in Kaga, Ishikawa. His given name was Chozaburo. He was the son of Yamada Munemitsu (died 1908), a ninth-generation armorer, who learned metal-hammering in a Myochin-school studio.

He devised a proprietary technology that hammered out three-dimensional vases and okimono figurines from one piece of iron plate. He became a master craftsman in this technique and was exhibited at the Louisiana Purchase Exposition in St. Louis in 1904, where he won a prize. He was nominated to be an Imperial Household Artist, before he died at age 44.

One of his disciples was Sosei Kurose (1886-1944), and his disciple was Sokyu Yamashita (died around 1975) who in turn had no disciples of his own. The art of how Yamada was able to complete his works was lost. His works are highly priced and are collected by museums and private owners. An oviform iron vase with short everted neck, finely hammered in low relief with a heron in water by reeds, about 38.7 cm high achieved a sale at an auction by Christie's in April 2016 for a price of USD 30,000.

== Works ==
- Lion and Lioness
- Pigeon on roof tile, Kaga City Art Museum
- Rabbit, which has ears that are 11 cm long. Kaga City Art Museum
