= Enuma District =

Former district in Ishikawa prefecture, Japan

Enuma (江沼郡, Enuma-gun) was a district located in Ishikawa Prefecture, Japan.

As of 2003, the district had an estimated population of 9,801 with a density of 63.48 persons per km^{2}. The total area was 154.39 km^{2}.

== Municipalities ==
Prior to its dissolution, the district consisted of only one town:

- Yamanaka (Note: Classified as a town.)

== History ==
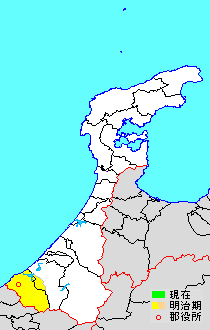
Map showing original extent of Enuma District in Ishikawa Prefecture: * yellow - areas formerly within the district borders during the early Meiji period

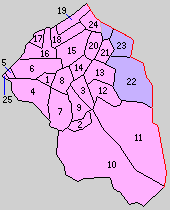
Colored areas are in this district.

=== Recent mergers ===
- On October 1, 2005 - The town of Yamanaka was merged into the expanded city of Kaga. Therefore, Enuma District was dissolved as a result of this merger.

== See also ==
- List of dissolved districts of Japan
