= Yamashiro Onsen =

Hot springs resort in Ishikawa Prefecture, Japan

Yamashiro Onsen 山代温泉
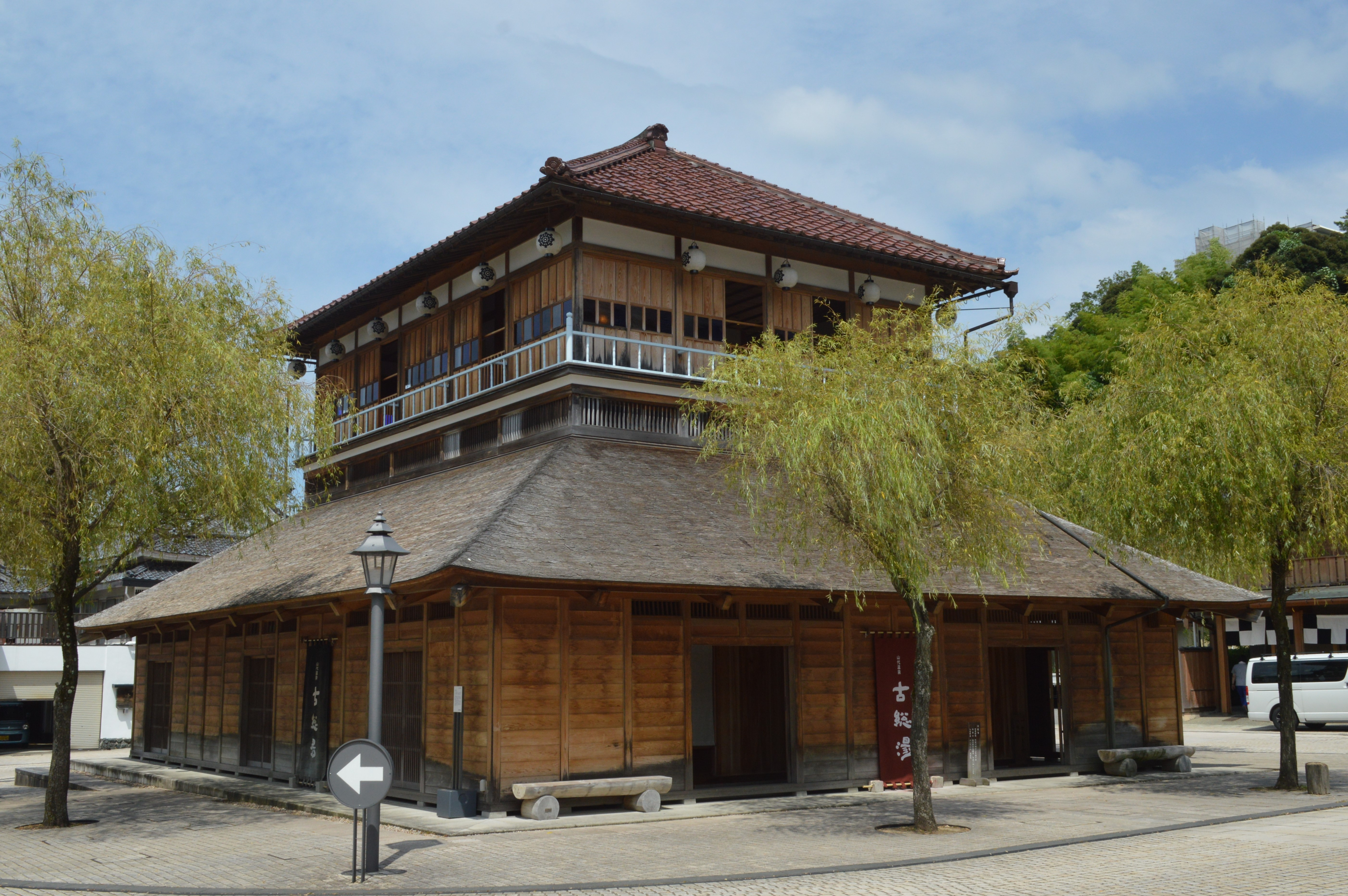
- Public bath at Yamashiro onsen

- Location within Japan
- Interactive map of Yamashiro Onsen 山代温泉
- Location: Kaga, Ishikawa, Japan
- Coordinates: 36°17′29″N 136°21′44″E
- Type: slightly alkaline, saline, sulphur
- Discharge: 1450 liters/min
- Temperature: 65 deg C

Yamashiro Onsen (山代温泉, Yamashiro onsen) is a hot spring resort in the city of Kaga, Ishikawa Prefecture, Japan. It is one of the largest in the three prefectures which constitute the Hokuriku region of Japan.

The onsen has one hotel and 31 ryokan.

== History ==
Yamashiro Onsen has a very ancient history, and there are several myths about its foundation.

One story attributes it to the wandering Buddhist monk Gyōki in the Nara period who discovered the springs while following an injured crow and seeing it bathe in the hot waters.

During the Heian period it developed as part of a Buddhist temple called Yakuo-in Onsen-ji (薬王院温泉寺), dedicated to Yakushi Nyorai, the Buddha of medicine. It was patronised in the Sengoku period by Akechi Mitsuhide and was visited in the Meiji period by numerous literary personages.

After World War II, it developed due it its ease of access to Osaka and Kyoto.

== Gallery ==
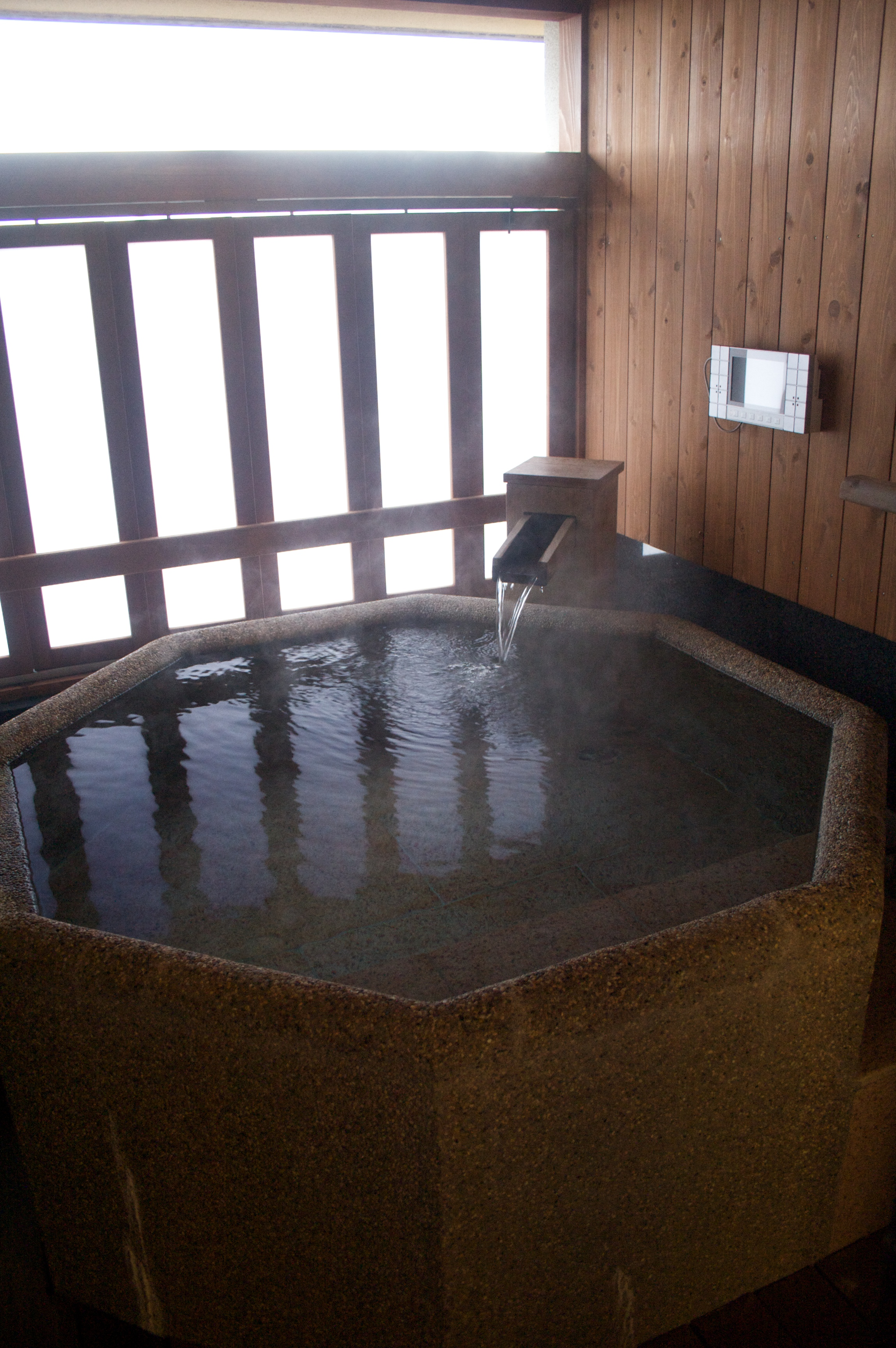
Inside a ryokan

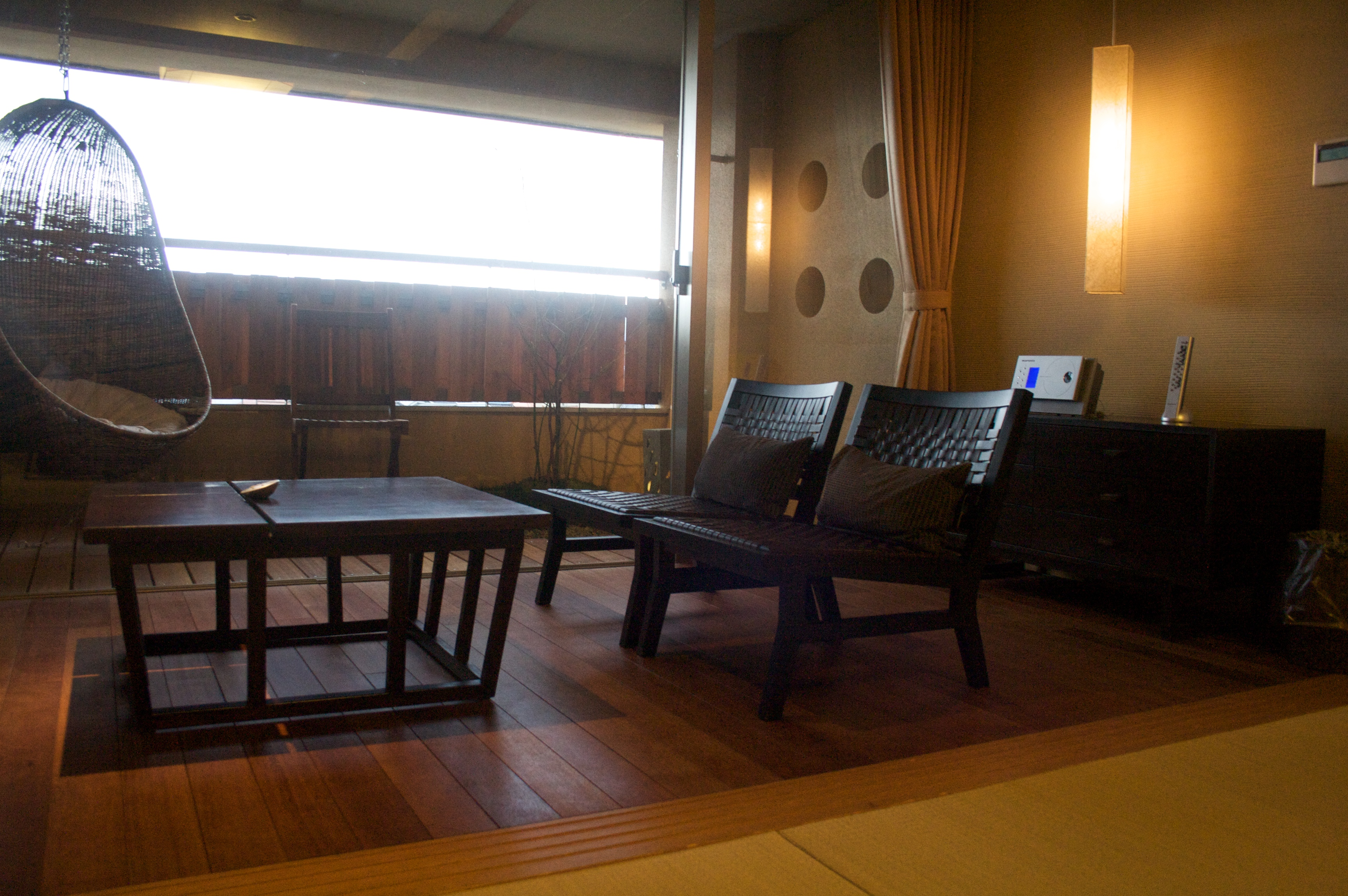
Inside a ryokan

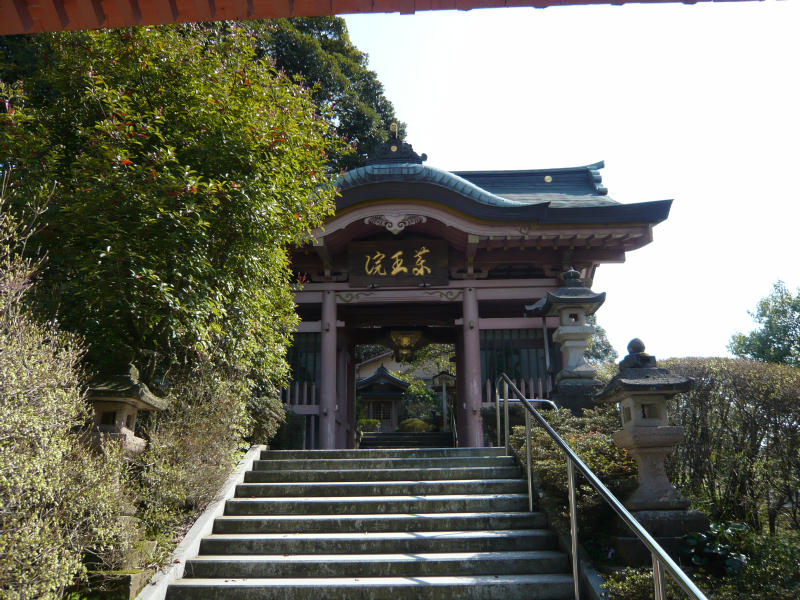
Yakuyo-in Onsen-ji Buddhist temple
