= Taimatsuden Inari Shrine =

Shrine in Kyoto, Japan

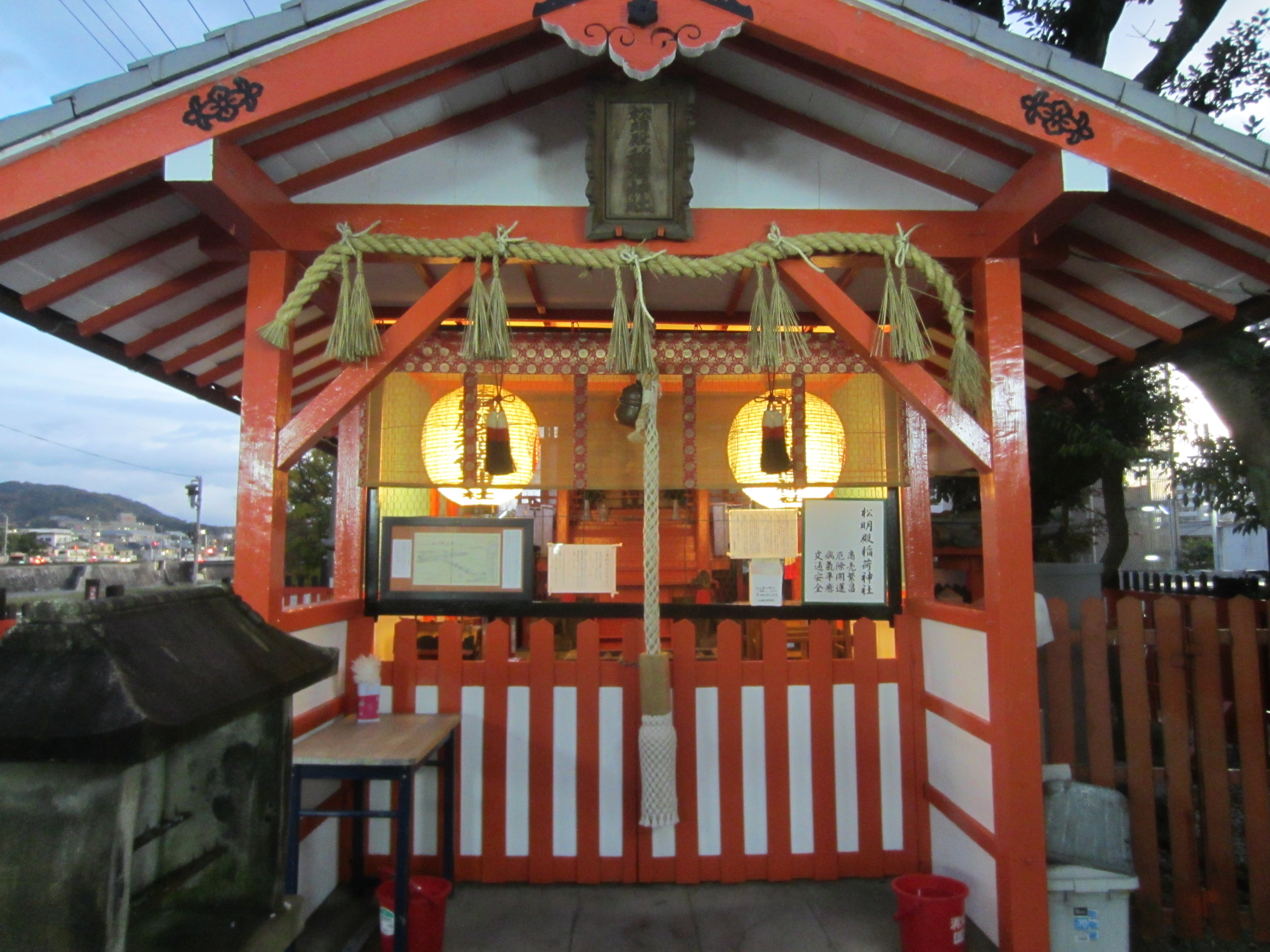
- The shrine in 2019

Religion
- District: Shimogyō-ku
- Region: Kyoto
- Deity: Inari

Location
- Country: Japan

Taimatsuden Inari Shrine is an Inari shrine in Shimogyō-ku, Kyoto, Japan.

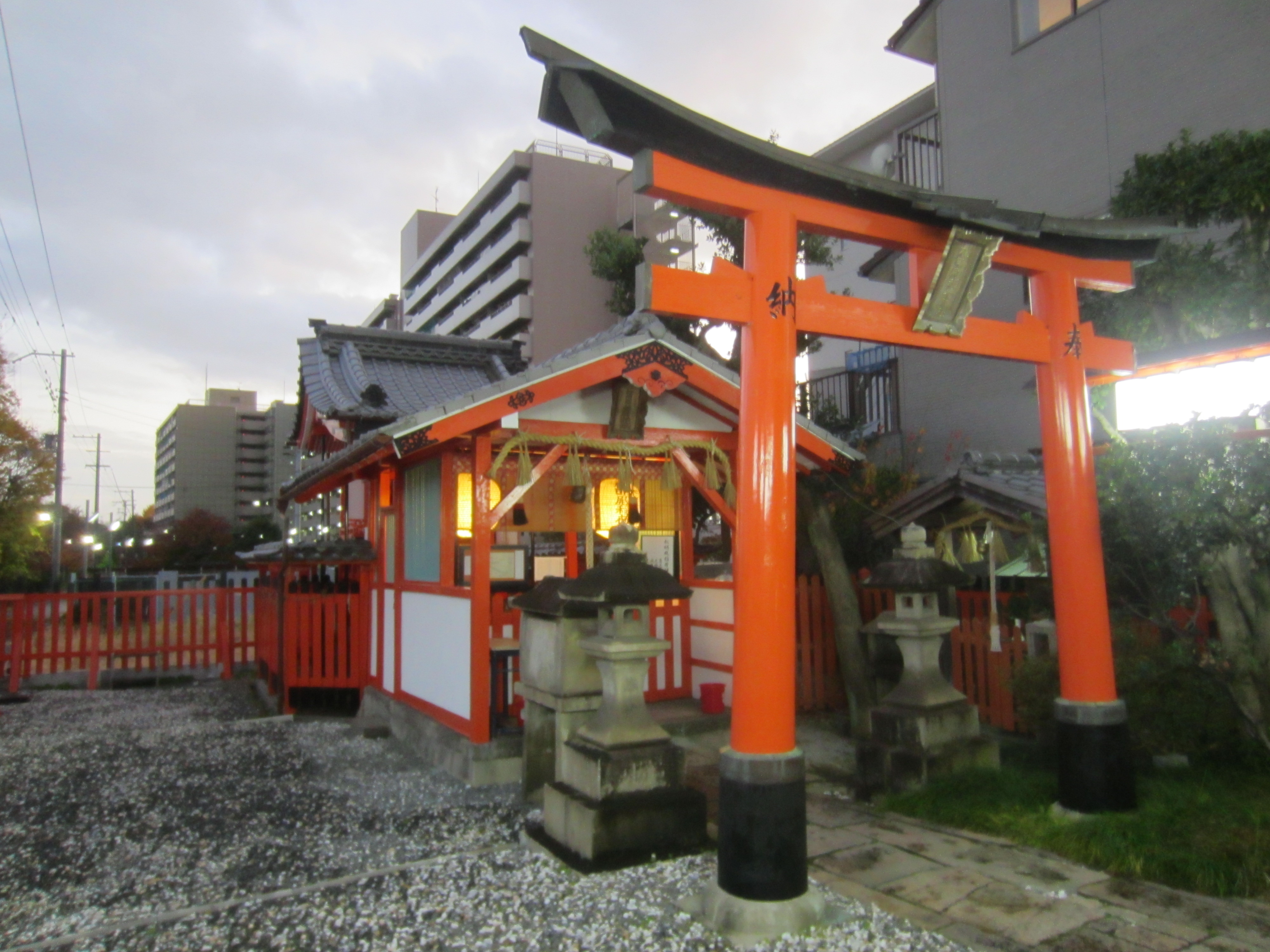

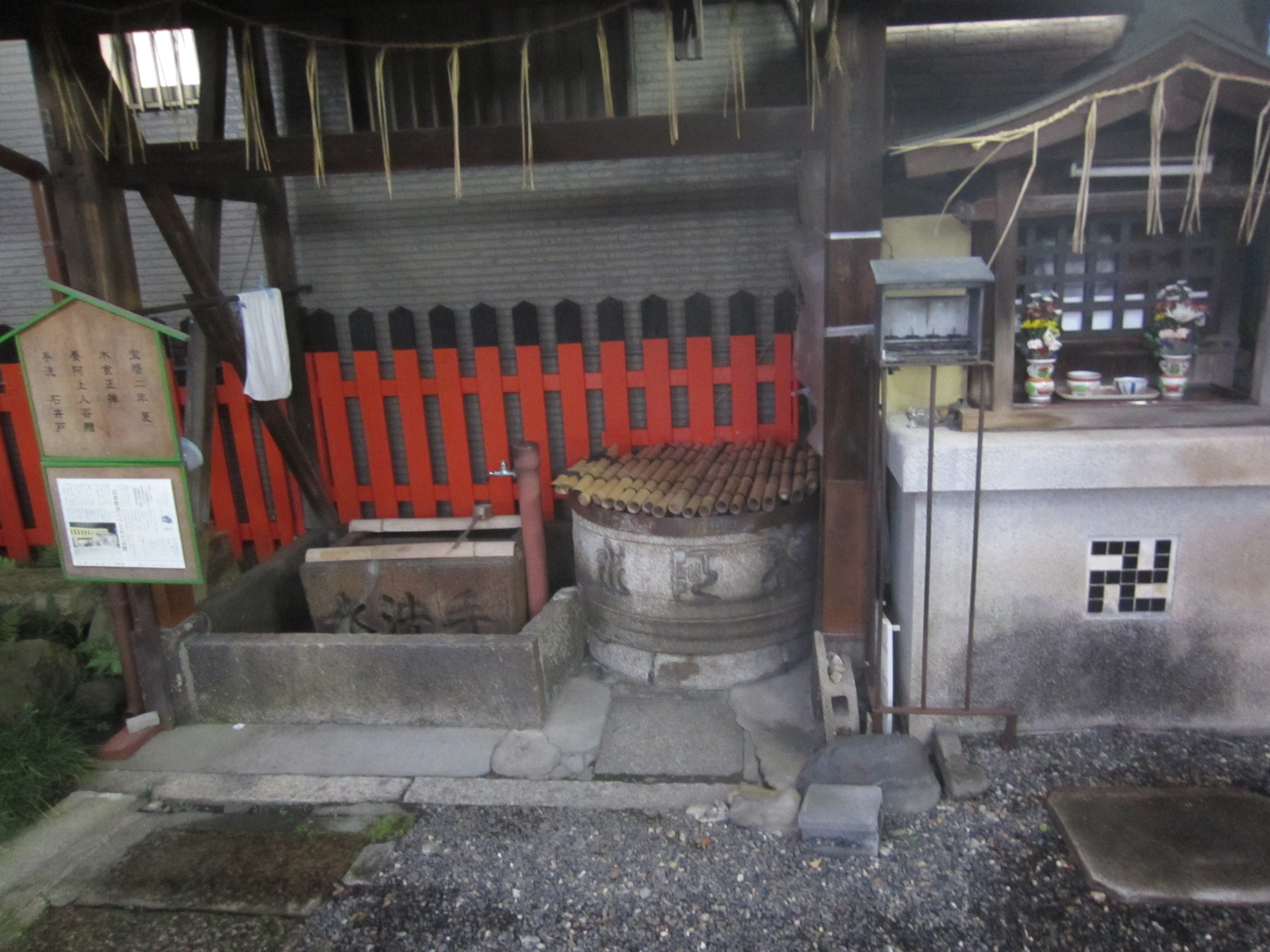

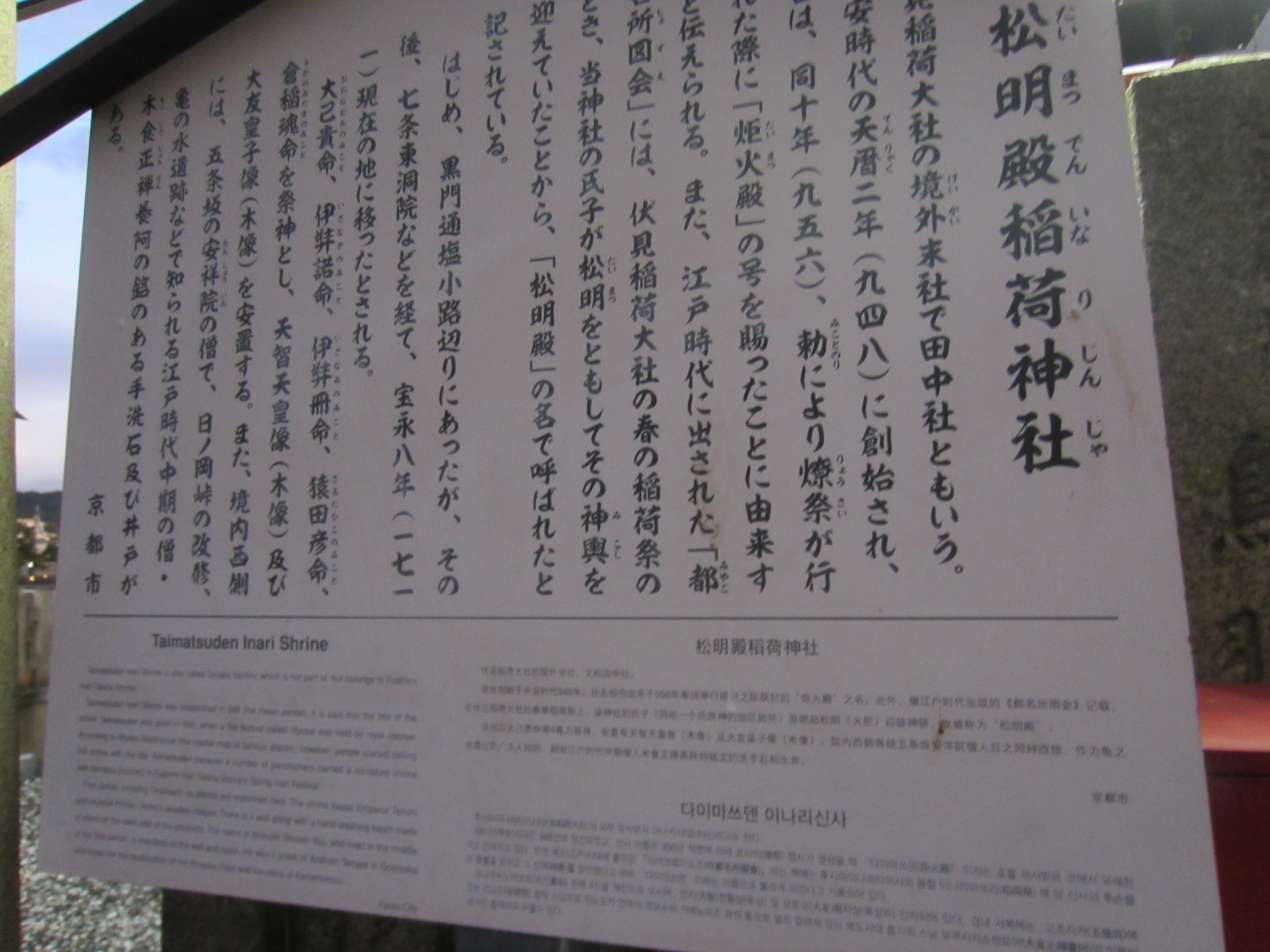
