= Japan National Route 366 =

Road in Aichi prefecture, Japan

National Route 366
- 国道366号
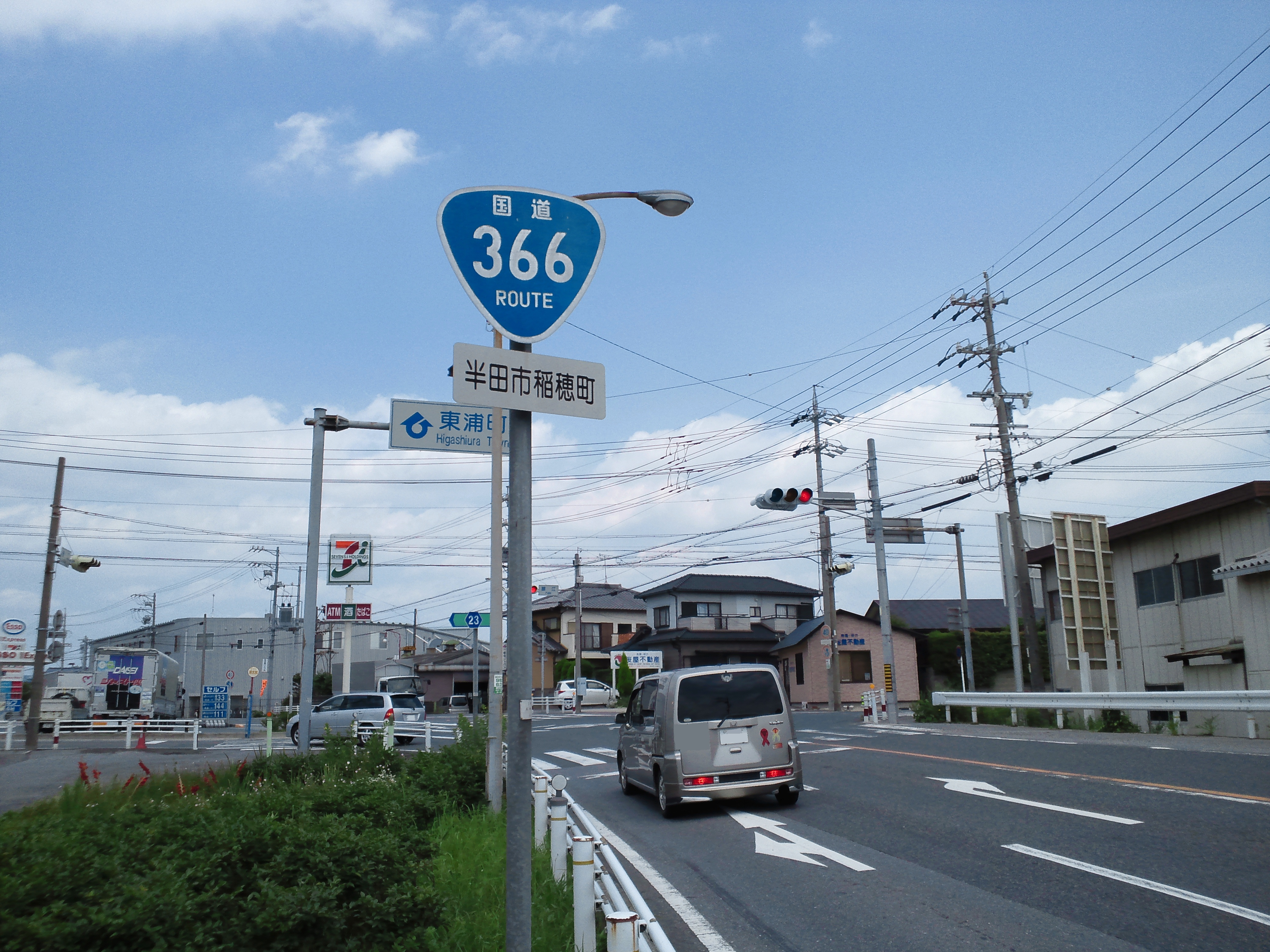

Route information
- Length: 20.1 km (12.5 mi)
- Existed: 1975–present

Major junctions
- West end: National Route 247 in Handa, Aichi
- East end: National Route 23 in Atsuta-ku, Nagoya

Location
- Country: Japan

Highway system
- National highways of Japan; Expressways of Japan
← National Route 365	→ National Route 367

National Route 366 is a national highway of Japan connecting Handa, Aichi and Atsuta-ku, Nagoya within Japan, with a total length of 20.1 km (12.49 mi).
