= Okimono =

Japanese carving

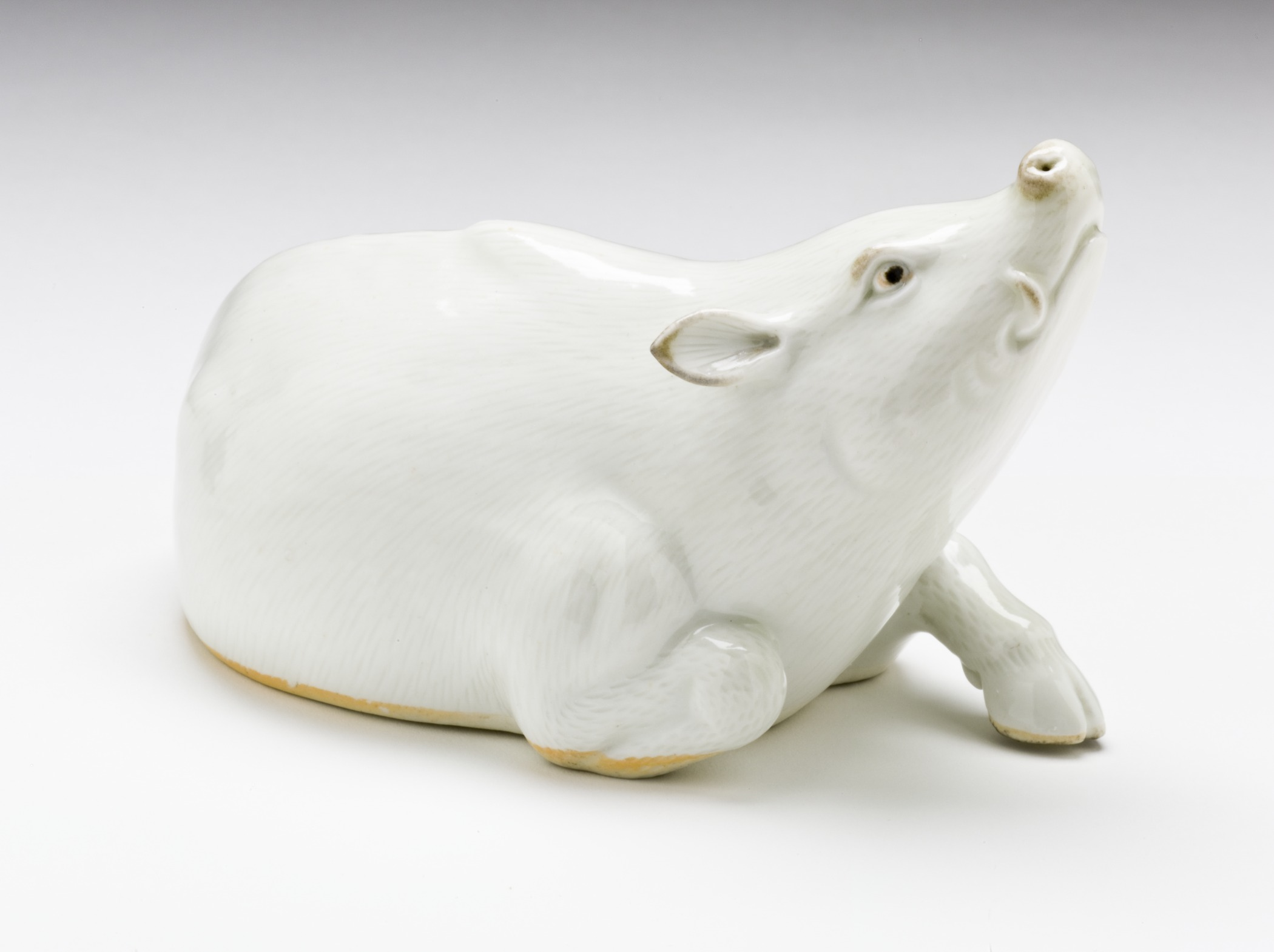
Okimono of a reclining boar, Hirado Mikawachi porcelain with clear glaze, Edo period, 19th century

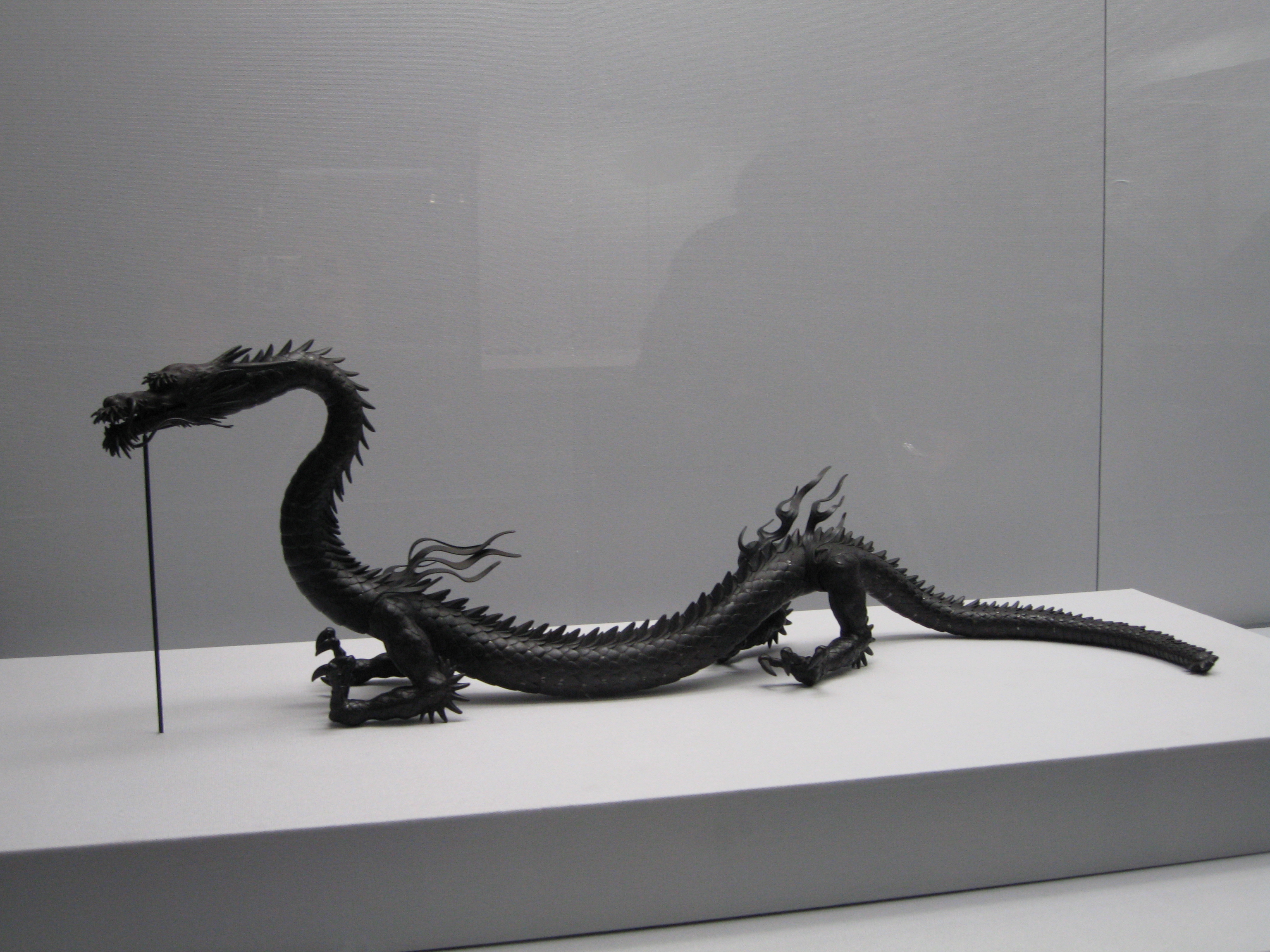
Jizai okimono figure of a dragon made of iron, by Myochin Muneaki in 1713

In Japanese art, okimono (置物) is a Japanese term meaning "ornament for display; objet d'art; decorative object", for small objects typically displayed in a tokonoma alcove or butsudan altar. The nearest equivalent term in Western art is probably objet d'art.

During the Meiji period and thereafter, many okimono were made for export to the West.

An okimono may be a small Japanese carving, similar to, but larger than netsuke. Unlike netsuke, which have a specific purpose, okimono are purely decorative and are displayed in the tokonoma. This view has however sometimes been questioned, with some suggesting that okimono often had both utilitarian and decorative purposes, especially before Western influence. An okimono can be made out of wood, ivory, ceramic or metal.

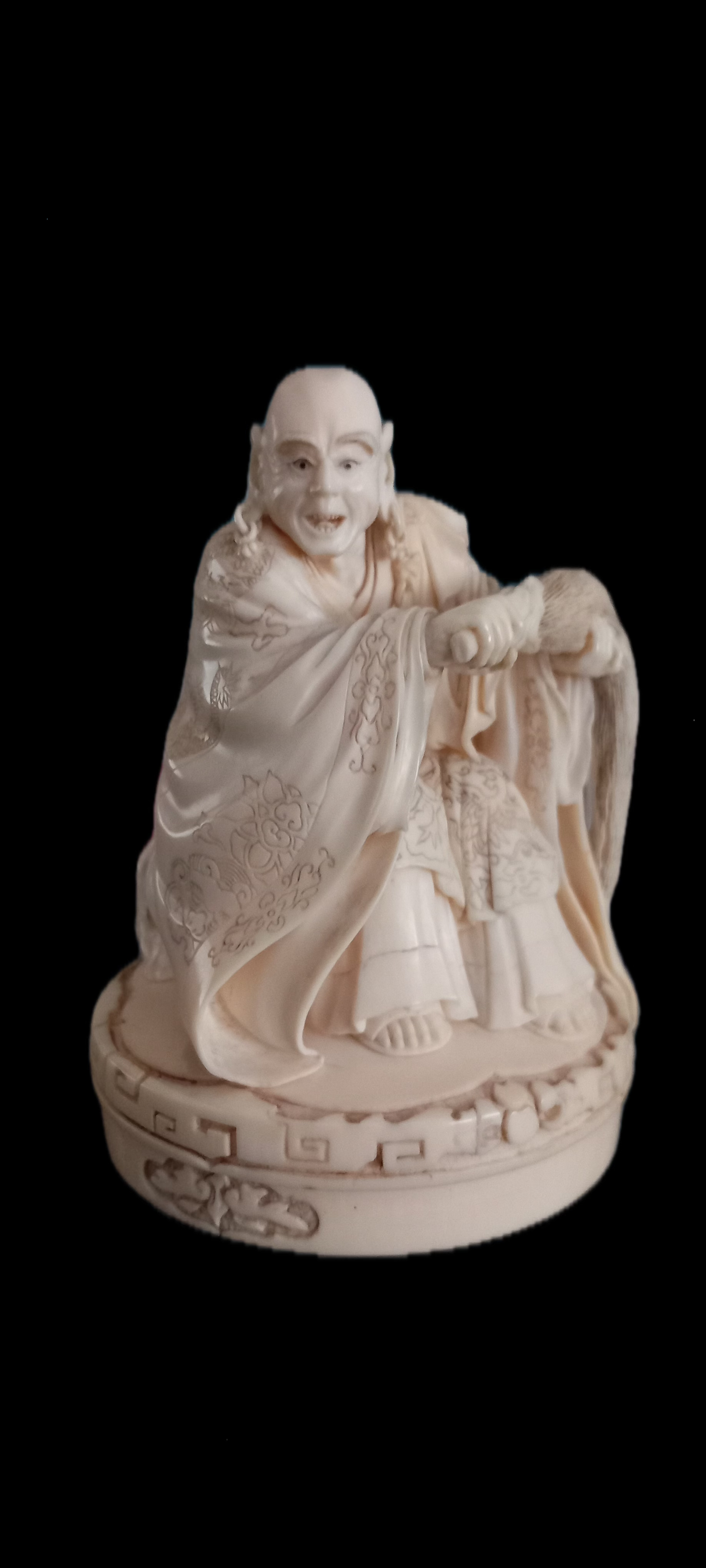
Ivory okimono depicting a Rakan, circa 1860–1900, Meiji period, height 8.7 cm.

One subcategory of okimono is the jizai okimono, an articulated figure, typically of an animal, made out of bronze or iron. Okimono are normally not larger than a few centimetres. They depict all sorts of animals, mythological beasts, humans, gods, fruit, vegetables and objects, sometimes combined with each other, in all sorts of positions. Sometimes a scene is portrayed as well, either a daily scene or from a story.

Anything that could be carved or made into a small object can be used in an okimono. Some okimono were inspired by a group of objects and were supposed to be shown together as an ensemble.

== Etymology ==
The Japanese word okimono compounds oku (置く, "put; place; set; lay out; assign; station; leave") and mono (物, "thing; object; article").. The Oxford English Dictionary defines the loanword okimono as "A standing ornament or figure, esp. one put in a guest room of a house", and records the first usage in 1886 by William Anderson.

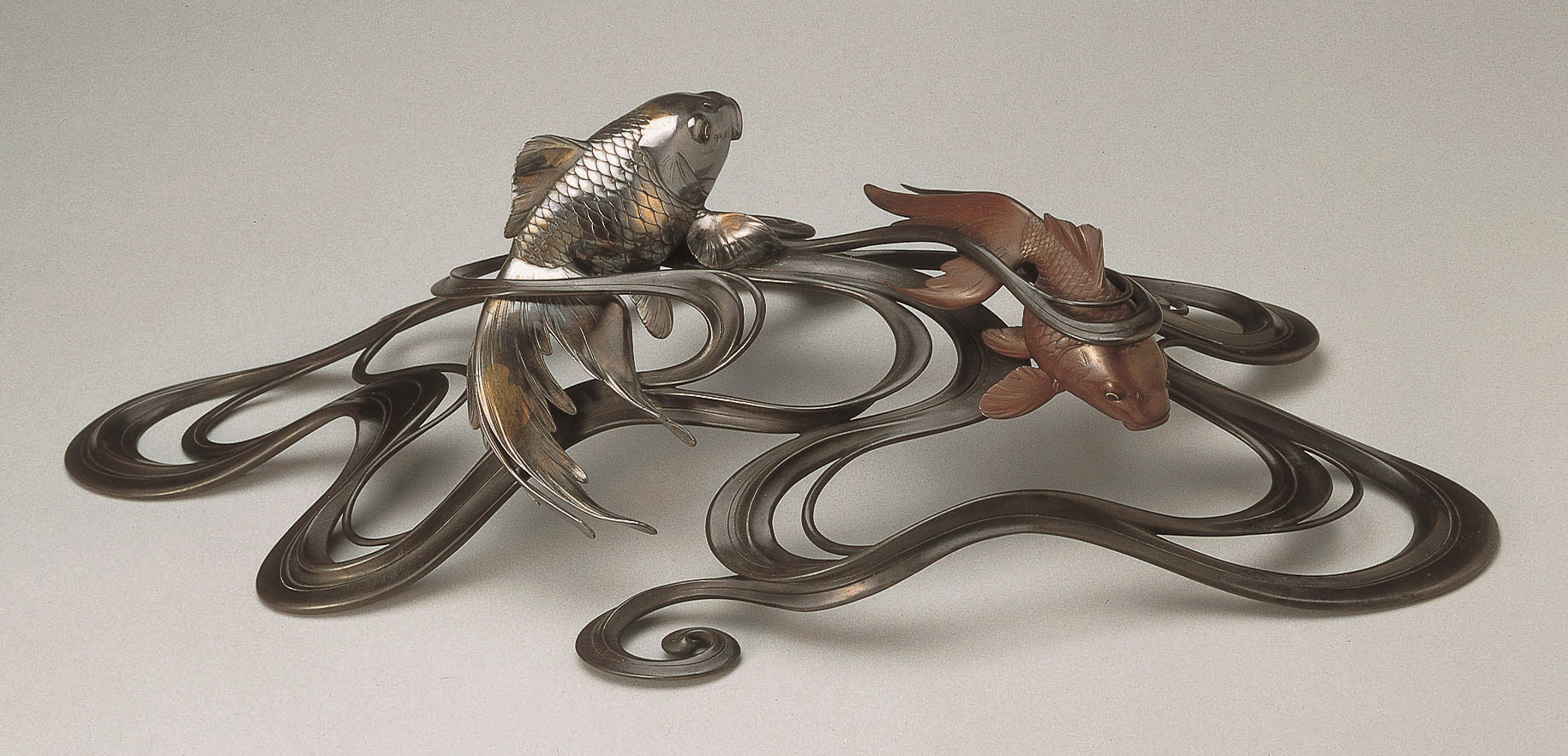
Okimono of fish in water, c. 1900 in the Khalili Collection of Japanese Art

== Example ==
Ivory Okimono Depicting a Rakan (circa 1860–1900)

This small ivory okimono represents a Rakan, an iconic figure in Buddhism embodying wisdom and compassion. The Rakan symbolizes enlightenment and serves as a model for Buddhist monks. The sculpture shows the Rakan seated on a rock, holding a hossu, a ritual fly whisk used in Buddhist ceremonies. He is dressed in a kesa decorated with a dragon motif and a shisa head, traditional Japanese symbols of protection and power. It is carved from a single piece of ivory, demonstrating exceptional finesse.

== Artists ==
One of the most renowned artists in the area of metalwork was Yamada Sōbi (1871-1916), who made pieces out of a single sheet of metal.
