= Japan National Route 476 =

Road in Fukui prefecture, Japan

National Route 476
- 国道476号
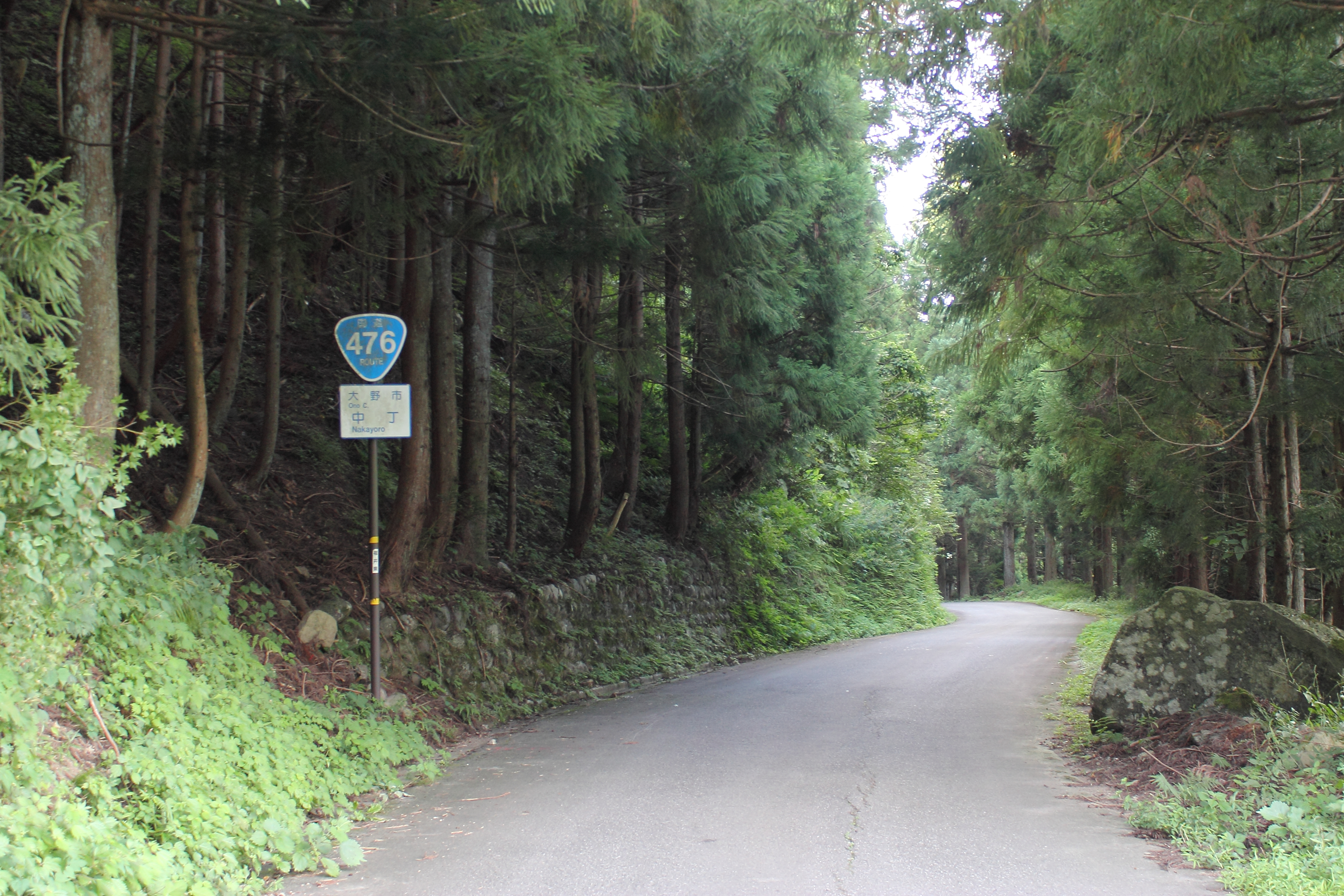

Route information
- Length: 76.2 km (47.3 mi)
- Existed: 1 April 1993–present

Major junctions
- From: National Route 157 / National Route 418 in Ōno
- To: National Route 8 in Tsuruga

Location
- Country: Japan

Highway system
- National highways of Japan; Expressways of Japan
← National Route 475	→ National Route 477

National Route 476 is a national highway of Japan. The highway connects Ōno, Fukui and Tsuruga, Fukui. It has a total length of 76.2 kilometers (47.3 mi).
