= Yamanaka, Ishikawa =

Dissolved municipality in Ishikawa prefecture, Japan

Yamanaka (山中町, Yamanaka-machi) was a town located in Enuma District, Ishikawa Prefecture, Japan.

As of 2003, the town has an estimated population of 9,801 and a density of 63.48 persons per km^{2}. The total area is 154.39 km^{2}.

On October 1, 2005, Yamanaka was merged into the expanded city of Kaga and no longer exists as an independent municipality.

== See also ==
- Yamanaka Onsen
