= Japan National Route 477 =

National highway in Japan

Coordinates: 35°09′00″N 135°47′06″E

National Route 477
- 国道477号
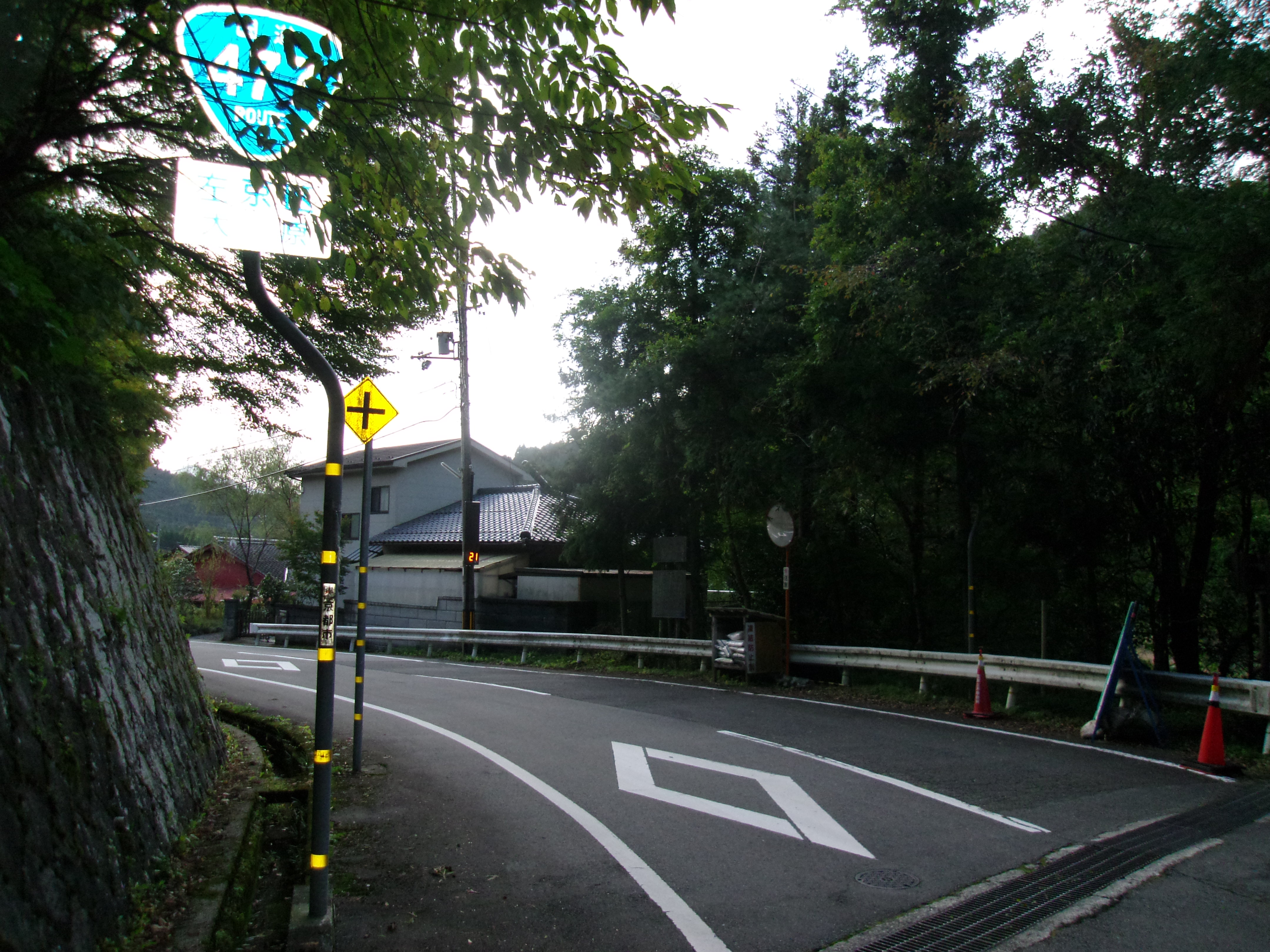

Route information
- Length: 217.6 km (135.2 mi)

Location
- Country: Japan

Highway system
- National highways of Japan; Expressways of Japan
← National Route 476	→ National Route 478

National Route 477 is a national highway of Japan. The highway connects Yokkaichi, Mie and Ikeda, Osaka. It has a total length of 217.6 kilometers (135.2 mi).

== Route description ==
A section of the Biwako bridge that carries National Route 477 over Lake Biwa is a musical road.
