= Japan National Route 365 =

Road in Japan

National Route 365
- 国道365号
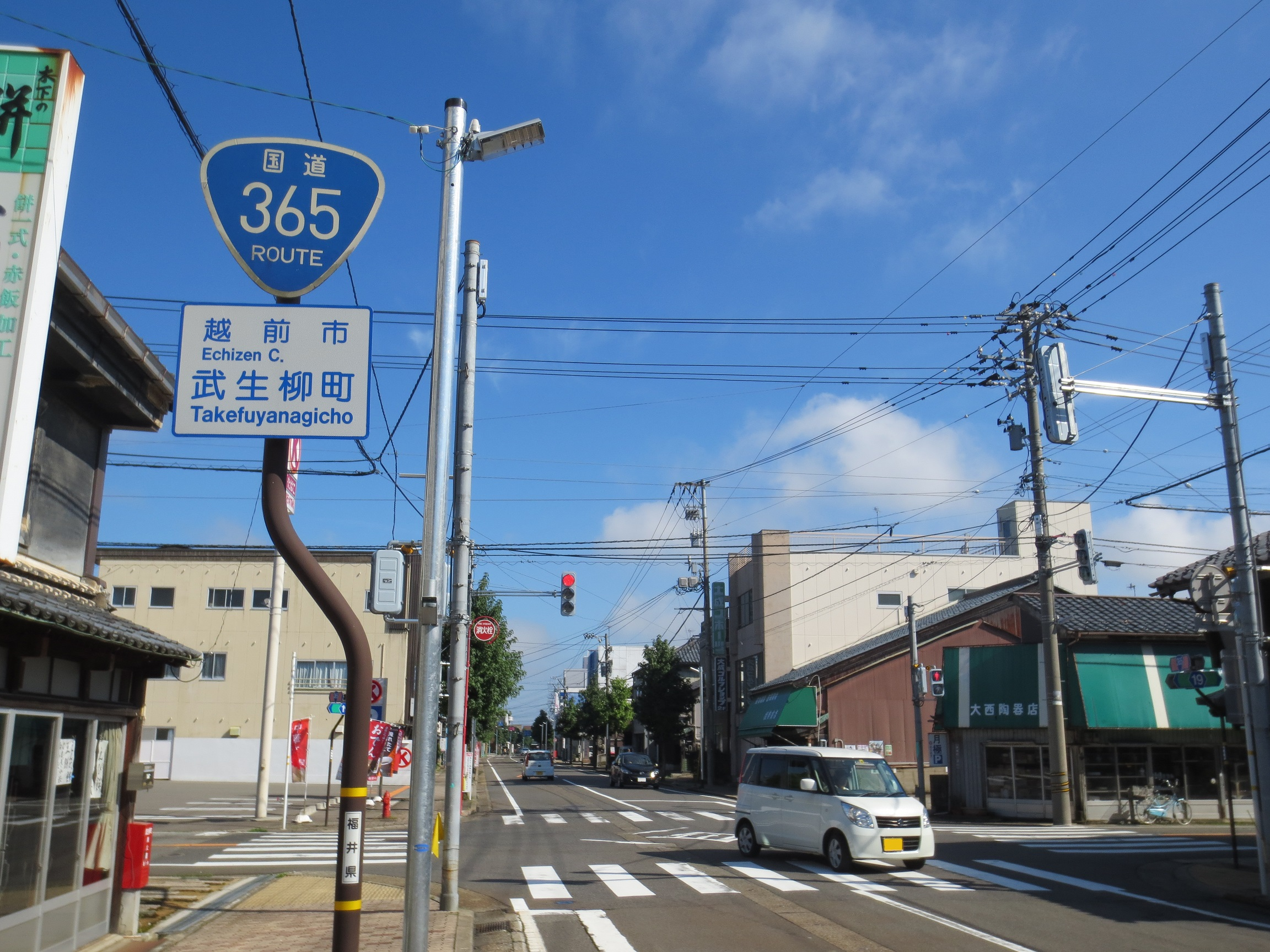

Route information
- Length: 229.4 km (142.5 mi)

Location
- Country: Japan

Highway system
- National highways of Japan; Expressways of Japan
← National Route 364	→ National Route 366

National Route 365 is a national highway of Japan connecting Kaga, Ishikawa and Yokkaichi, Mie in Japan, with a total length of 229.4 km (142.54 mi).
