= Japan National Route 364 =

National highway in Japan

National Route 364
- 国道364号

Route information
- Length: 62.8 km (39.0 mi)

Location
- Country: Japan

Highway system
- National highways of Japan; Expressways of Japan
← National Route 363	→ National Route 365

National Route 364 is a national highway of Japan connecting Ōno, Fukui and Kaga, Ishikawa in Japan, with a total length of 62.8 km (39.02 mi).
