= Japan National Route 367 =

Road in Japan

National Route 367
- 国道367号
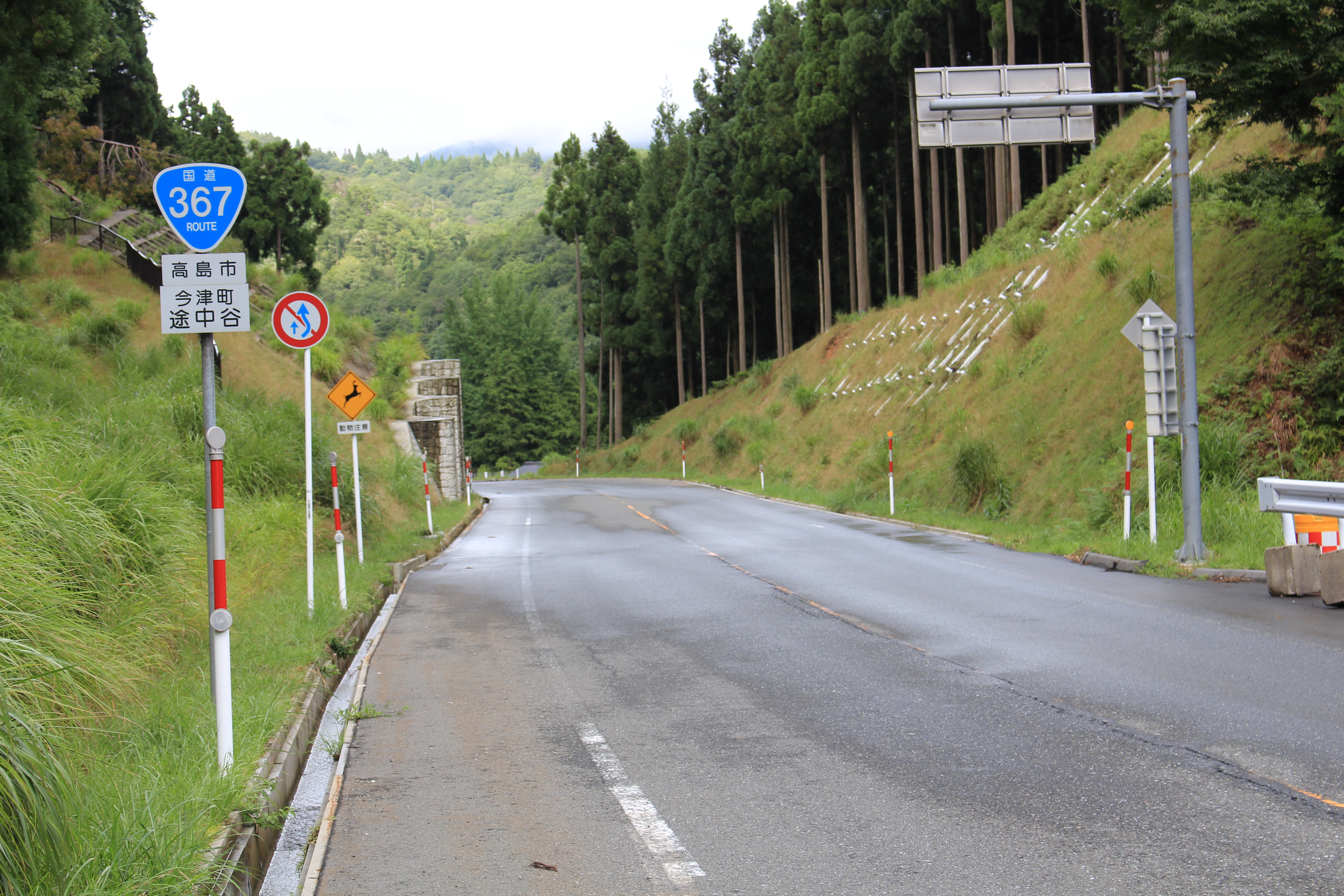

Route information
- Length: 68.5 km (42.6 mi)

Location
- Country: Japan

Highway system
- National highways of Japan; Expressways of Japan
← National Route 366	→ National Route 368

National Route 367 is a national highway of Japan connecting between Shimogyō-ku, Kyoto and Wakasa, Fukui in Japan, with total length has 68.5 km (42.56 mi).
