= Shimogyō-ku =

Shimogyō 下京区
- Ward of Kyoto
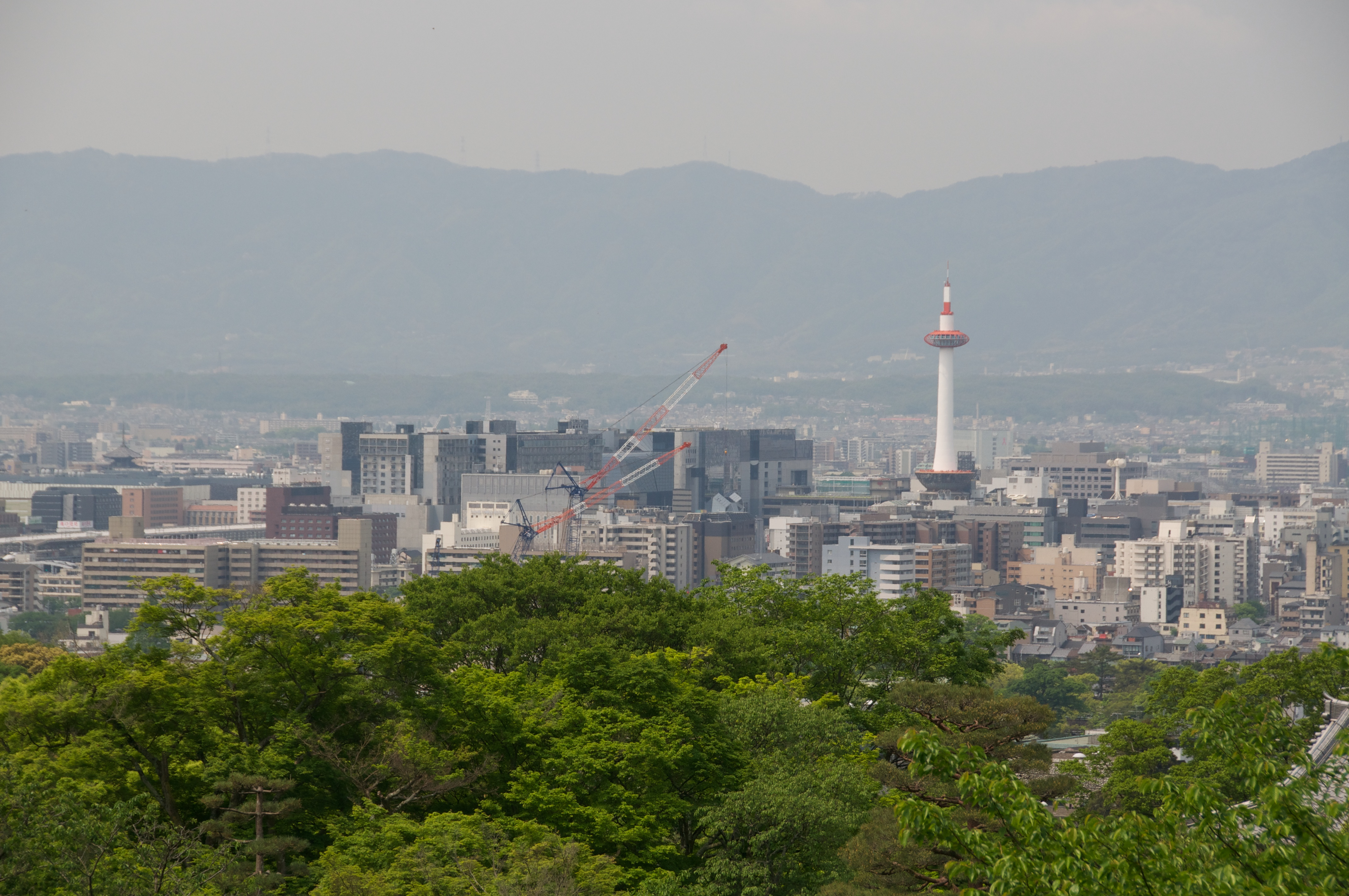

- Location of Shimogyō-ku in Kyoto

- Location of Shimogyō-ku in Japan Shimogyō (Kyoto Prefecture) Shimogyō (Japan)
- Coordinates: 34°59′15″N 135°45′20″E
- Country: Japan
- Prefecture: Kyoto
- City: Kyoto
- Founded: 1879

Area
  - Total: 6.78 km^{2} (2.62 sq mi)
- Highest elevation: 38 m (125 ft)
- Lowest elevation: 20 m (66 ft)

Population (October 1, 2020)
  - Total: 82,784
  - Estimate (2021): 82,391
  - Density: 12,200/km^{2} (31,600/sq mi)
- Time zone: UTC+9 (Japan Standard Time)
- Website: www.city.kyoto.lg.jp/shimogyo/

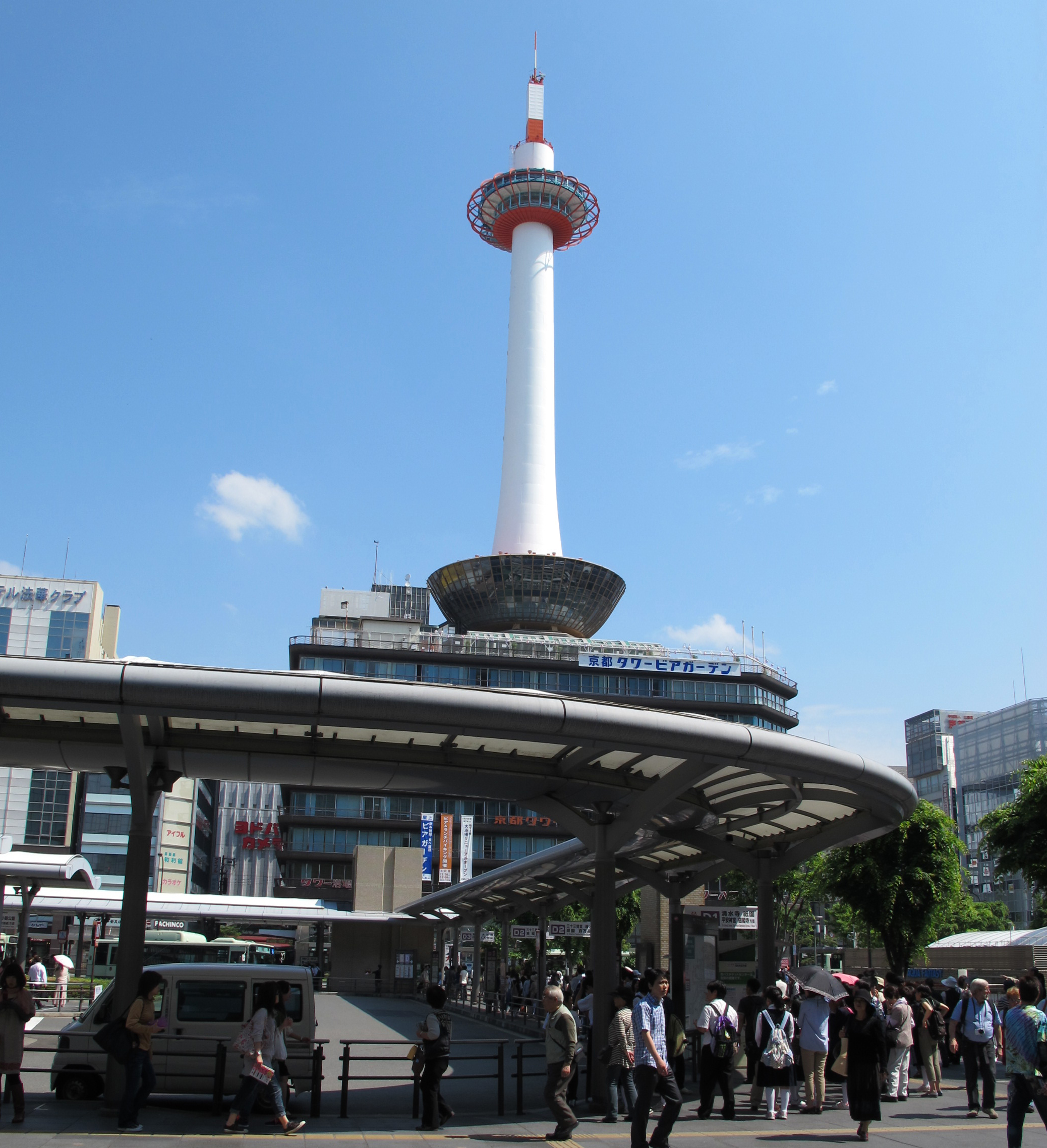
Kyoto Tower is a landmark in Shimogyō-ku.

Shimogyō-ku (下京区) is one of the eleven wards in the city of Kyoto, in Kyoto Prefecture, Japan. First established in 1879, it has been merged and split, and took on its present boundaries in 1955, with the establishment of a separate Minami-ku.

Kyoto Tower and Kyoto Station are major landmarks in Shimogyō-ku. Shijō Street on the northern edge of the area, especially around the Shijō Kawaramachi intersection, is the busiest shopping district in the city. Kyoto Station has an extensive shopping center, including a department store in the station building, and the underground Porta mall.

Shimogyō-ku has a population of 82,784 and an area of 6.78 km^{2}. Three rivers, Horikawa, Kamogawa and Takasegawa pass through the ward.

== Demographics ==
Historical population
Year	Pop.	±%
1960	146,174	—
1970	116,200	−20.5%
1980	86,821	−25.3%
1990	73,457	−15.4%
2000	71,212	−3.1%
2010	79,287	+11.3%
2020	82,784	+4.4%

== Economy ==
- Bank of Kyoto, a Japanese bank based in Kyoto.
- Omron, a global electronic components and automation manufacturer is headquartered in the ward.
- Takara Holdings, a company mainly involved in the production of beverages and medical supplies
- Tose, a video game and mobile game development company

== Education ==
- Campus Plaza Kyoto
- Ikenobo Junior College
- Omiya Campus of Ryukoku University

Lycée français international de Kyoto, a French international school, is in Shimogyô-ku.

== Sights ==
- Higashi Honganji
- Kyoto Railway Museum
- Nishi Honganji
- Taimatsuden Inari Shrine
