= E41 =

E41, E-41 or E.41 may refer to:

- HMS E41, a United Kingdom Royal Navy E-class submarine which saw service during World War I
- European route E41, a road in Germany and Switzerland
- DB Class E 41, a locomotive manufactured in Germany
- Nimzo-Indian Defense, Encyclopaedia of Chess Openings code
- Tōkai-Hokuriku Expressway and Nōetsu Expressway, route E41 in Japan
- Long Win Bus Route E41 in Hong Kong
