= E67 =

E67 may refer to:

- European route E67
- King's Indian Defence, Encyclopaedia of Chess Openings code
- Chūbu-Jūkan Expressway (includes concurrency section with Tōkai-Hokuriku Expressway), route E67 in Japan
- The high-security variant of the E65 BMW 7 Series
