= Ginan, Gifu =

Ginan 岐南町
- Town
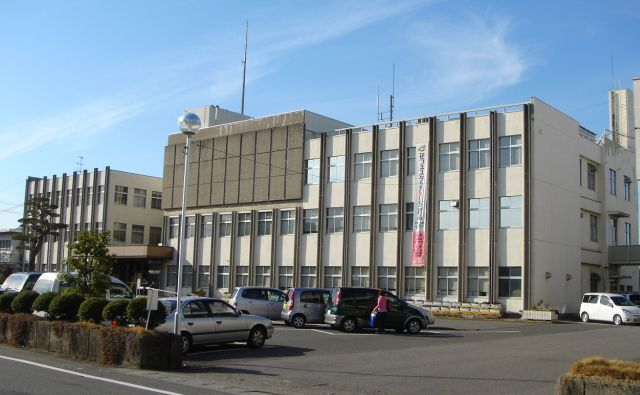
- Ginan Town Hall

- Flag Seal

- Location of Ginan in Gifu Prefecture

- Coordinates: 35°23′22.6″N 136°46′57.1″E
- Country: Japan
- Region: Chūbu
- Prefecture: Gifu
- District: Hashima

Government
  - Mayor: Yuki Goto

Area
  - Total: 7.91 km^{2} (3.05 sq mi)

Population (December 1, 2018)
  - Total: 25,661
  - Density: 3,240/km^{2} (8,400/sq mi)
- Time zone: UTC+9 (Japan Standard Time)
- City symbols
- Tree: Ilex integra
- Flower: Chrysanthemum morifolium
- Phone number: 058-388-1111
- Address: Yatsurugi 7-107, Ginan-chō, Hashima-gun, Gifu-ken 501-6197
- Website: Official website

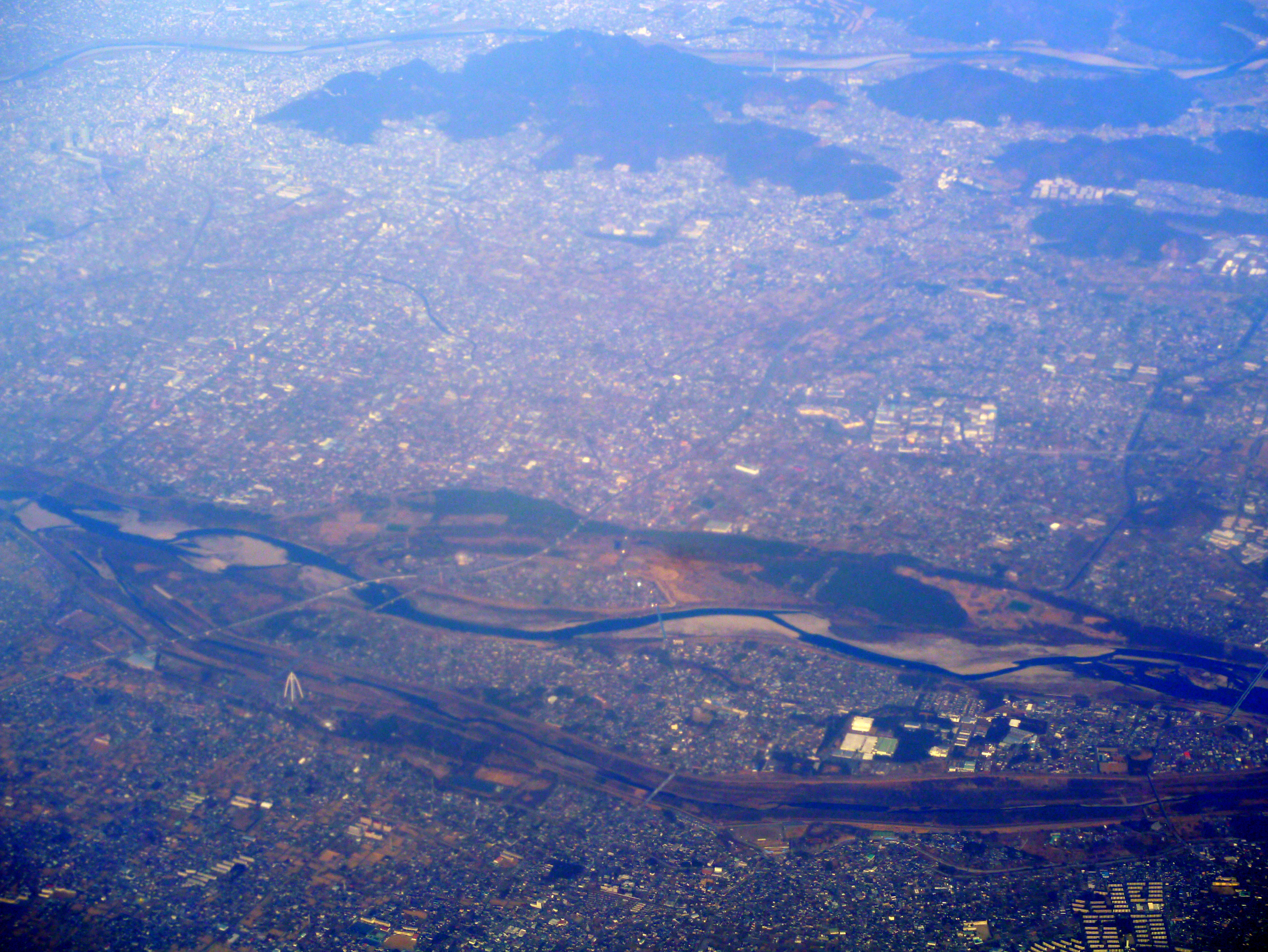
Nobi plain and Kiso River

Ginan (岐南町, Ginan-chō) is a town located in Hashima District, Gifu, Japan. As of 1 December 2018, the town had an estimated population of 25,661 and a population density of 3200 persons per km^{2}, in 10,633 households. The total area of the town was 7.91 square kilometres (3.05 sq mi).

== Geography ==
Ginan is located in the Nōbi Plain in southern Gifu Prefecture, bordering on Aichi Prefecture. The Kiso River and the Sakai River flow through the town, which is located in marshy flatlands and was often subject to flooding. The town has a climate characterized by characterized by hot and humid summers, and mild winters (Köppen climate classification Cfa). The average annual temperature in Ginan is 15.6 °C. The average annual rainfall is 1934 mm with September as the wettest month. The temperatures are highest on average in August, at around 28.1 °C, and lowest in January, at around 4.1 °C.

=== Neighbouring municipalities ===
- Aichi Prefecture
  - Ichinomiya
- Gifu Prefecture
  - Gifu
  - Kakamigahara
  - Kasamatsu

== Demographics ==
Per Japanese census data, the population of Ginan nearly doubled between 1970 and 1990, although growth has slowed since then.

Historical population
Year	Pop.	±%
1970	11,603	—
1980	18,309	+57.8%
1990	20,696	+13.0%
2000	22,137	+7.0%
2010	23,804	+7.5%
2020	25,881	+8.7%

== History ==
The area around Ginan was part of traditional Owari Province until the course of the Kiso River shifted in 1586, after which time it was part of Mino Province. It was an ancient settlement on the important river crossing connecting Nagoya with Gifu. During the Edo period, it was divided between territory controlled by Owari Domain and various small hatamoto holdings. During the post-Meiji restoration cadastral reforms, the area was organised into Haguri District, Gifu Prefecture, which was subsequently transferred to Hashima District, Gifu. The modern village of Ginan was formed on September 26, 1956, by the merger of the villages of Yatsuru and Kamiheguri. It was elevated to town status four days later on October 1, 1956. Plans to merge with the neighbouring city of Gifu were rejected by a referendum in June 2004.

== Economy ==
The mainstay of the local economy is agriculture (rice, vegetables, dairy, poultry), and light industry (computer related products, dairy products, chemicals).

== Education ==
Ginan has three public elementary schools and one public middle school operated by the town government. The one high school in town is a private girls high school.

== Transportation ==
=== Railway ===
- Meitetsu - Nagoya Main Line
  - Ginan

=== Highway ===
- E41 Tōkai-Hokuriku Expressway
- National Route 21
- National Route 22
- National Route 156
