= Ginan =

Ginan may refer to:

- Ginan, Gifu, a town in Japan
  - Ginan Station, a train station
- Ginan, the IAU-approved proper name of the star Epsilon Crucis
- Ginan (hymn), a type of devotional hymn of South Asia
