= Hokuriku Expressway =

National expressway in Japan

Hokuriku Expressway
- 北陸自動車道

Route information
- Length: 476.5 km (296.1 mi)
- Existed: 1972–present

Major junctions
- From: Niigata-Chūō Junction in Niigata, Niigata; Ban-etsu Expressway; Nihonkai-Tōhoku Expressway
- To: Maibara Junction in Maibara, Shiga; Meishin Expressway

Location
- Country: Japan
- Major cities: Nagaoka, Jōetsu, Uozu, Toyama, Kanazawa, Komatsu, Fukui, Sabae, Echizen, Tsuruga, Nagahama

Highway system
- National highways of Japan; Expressways of Japan

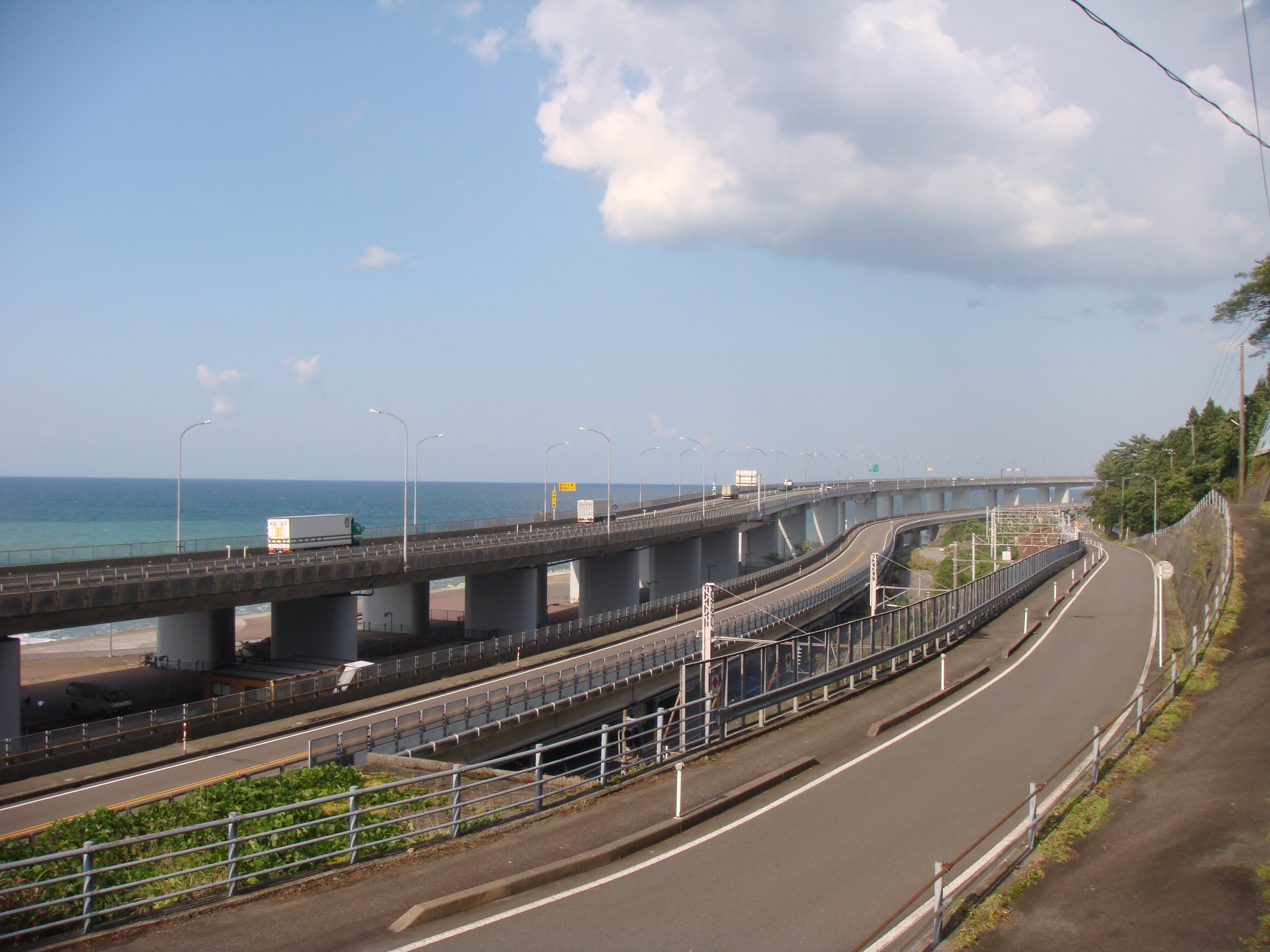
Oyashirazu, Itoigawa, Niigata Prefecture Left:Hokuriku Expressway Center:National Route 8 and JR Hokuriku Main Line Right: Niigata Prefectural Road Route 525

The Hokuriku Expressway (北陸自動車道, Hokuriku Jidōsha-dō), (abbreviated as Hokuriku Expwy (北陸道, Hokurikudō), is a 4-laned national expressway in Japan. It is owned and managed by East Nippon Expressway Company and Central Nippon Expressway Company.

== Overview ==
The first section was opened in 1972 by Japan Highway Public Corporation and construction proceeded in stages until the entire route was completed in 1988. On October 1, 2005, all national expressways were privatized and management of the Hokuriku Expressway was divided between the East and Central Nippon Expressway Companies.

The route serves the Hokuriku region on the north central coast of Honshū, Japan's largest island. For most of its length it parallels National Route 8 and the Hokuriku Main Line of West Japan Railway Company.

Although the route officially originates in Niigata and terminates at Maibara, exit numbers and kilometer markings originate from Maibara.

== Features ==
Around Tsuruga Interchange, the south-bound lanes cross over the north-bound lanes and diverges drastically. The expressway rejoins normally at a point near Suizu Parking Area.

There are 14 tunnels between Kinomoto Interchange and Takefu Interchange (two of which are longer than 2,000 m (6,600 ft)), and 26 tunnels between Asahi Interchange and Jōetsu Interchange (eight of which are longer than 2,000 m (6,600 ft)).

== List of interchanges and features ==
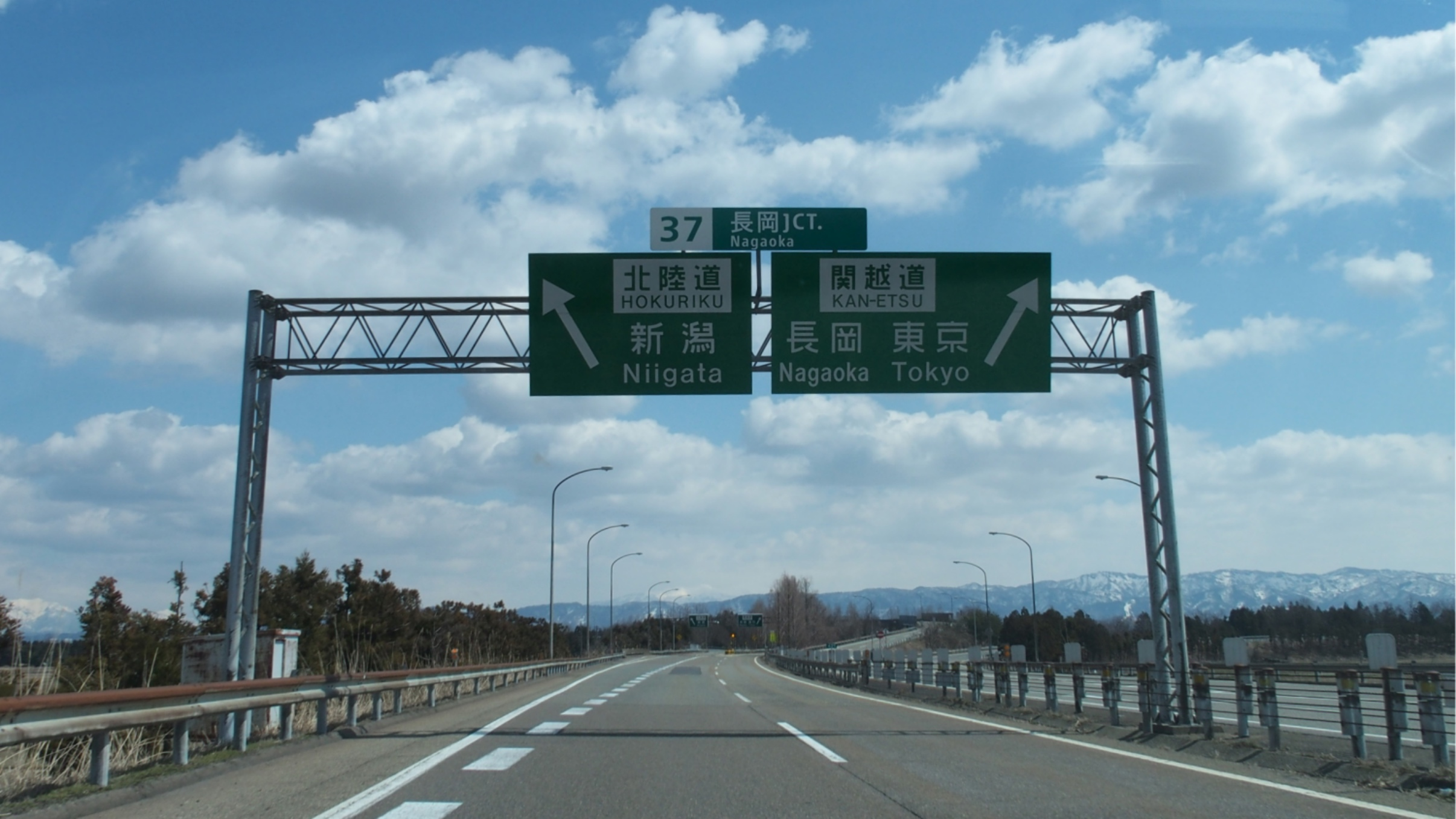
Nagaoka Junction

- IC - interchange, SIC - smart interchange, JCT - junction, SA - service area, PA - parking area, BS - bus stop, TN - tunnel, CB - snow chains

No.	Name	Connections	Dist. from Maibara	Bus Stop	Notes	Location	
27-1	Maibara JCT	Meishin Expressway	0.0			Maibara	Shiga
1	Maibara IC	National Route 21	0.6			Maibara	Shiga
PA	Kanda PA		4.7	X		Nagahama	Shiga
2	Nagahama IC	Pref. Route 37 (Nakayama Higashi Kōsaka Route)	9.6	X		Nagahama	Shiga
BS	Torahime Bus Stop			X	Closed	Nagahama	Shiga
2-1/BS	Odanijō SIC; Kohoku Bus Stop	Pref. Route 263 (Yōno Torahime Nagahama Route) (South-bound); Pref. Route 265 (Gōno Kohoku Route) (North-bound)	16.4	X	Bus Stop closed	Nagahama	Shiga
BS	Takatsuki Bus Stop			X	Closed	Nagahama	Shiga
3	Kinomoto IC	National Route 8 National Route 365	23.4	X		Nagahama	Shiga
SA	Shizugatake SA		25.6			Nagahama	Shiga
BS/CB	Yogo Bus Stop; Yogo Chain Base			X	Bus Stop closed	Nagahama	Shiga
BS/CB	Yogo-kita Bus Stop; Yogo-kita Chain Base			X	Bus Stop closed	Nagahama	Shiga
PA	Tone PA		38.5	X		Tsuruga	Fukui
3-1	Tsuruga JCT	Maizuru-Wakasa Expressway	45.4			Tsuruga	Fukui
4	Tsuruga IC	National Route 8 (Tsuruga Bypass)	46.6	○		Tsuruga	Fukui
BS/CB	Tajiri (South-bound); Akihara (North-bound)			X	Bus Stop closed	Tsuruga	Fukui
PA	Suizu PA		57.9	X		Tsuruga	Fukui
5	Imajō IC	National Route 305; National Route 365	68.2	X		Minamiechizen	Fukui
SA/ 5-1	Nanjō SA/SIC	Pref. Route 203 (Ikeda Nanjō Route)	71.4; 72.1	X	North-bound; South-bound	Minamiechizen	Fukui
6	Takefu IC	Pref. Route 262 (Takefu Inter Higashi Route); Pref. Route 40 (Takefu Inter Route)	80.6	○		Echizen	Fukui
7	Sabae IC	Pref. Route 105 (Sabae Imadate Route); Pref. Route 39 (Sabae Inter Route)	86.2	○		Sabae	Fukui
PA	Kitasabae PA		88.6			Sabae	Fukui
8	Fukui IC	National Route 158	97.2	○		Fukui	Fukui
9	Fukui-kita IC/JCT	Chūbu-Jūkan Expressway; National Route 416	103.6	○		Fukui	Fukui
10	Maruoka IC	Pref. Route 38 (Maruoka Inter Route)	110.4	○		Sakai	Fukui
PA	Onagatani PA		113.4			Sakai	Fukui
11	Kanazu IC	Pref. Route 37 (Kanazu Inter Route); Pref. Route 124 (Ushinoya Teishajō Route)	120.9			Awara	Fukui
12	Kaga IC	Pref. Route 61 (Kaga Inter Route)	128.2			Kaga	Ishikawa
SA	Amagozen SA		136.6; 136.9	○	South-bound; North-bound	Kaga	Ishikawa
13	Katayamazu IC	Pref. Route 20 (Komatsu Kaga Route)	140.7			Kaga	Ishikawa
PA/ 13-1	Ataka PA/SIC	Pref. Route 20 (Komatsu Kaga Route)	144.7		SIC: Maibara-bound; Open 06:00-22:00	Komatsu	Ishikawa
14	Komatsu IC	Pref. Route 25 (Kanazawa Mikawa Komatsu Route)	149.3	○		Komatsu	Ishikawa
14-1	Nomineagari SIC		155.4			Nomi	Ishikawa
15	Mikawa IC	Pref. Route 25 (Kanazawa Mikawa Komatsu Route); Pref. Route 58 (Tsurugi Mikawa Inter Route)	160.3			Hakusan	Ishikawa
PA/ 15-1	Tokumitsu PA/SIC	Pref. Route 25 (Kanazawa Mikawa Komatsu Route)	164.6	○	Highway Oasis	Hakusan	Ishikawa
BS	Mattō Bus Stop		169.6	X	closed by replacement	Hakusan	Ishikawa
15-2	Hakusan IC	Pref. Route 8 (Mattō Unoke Route)	169.9	○	incl. Mattō Bus Stop	Hakusan	Ishikawa
16	Kanazawa-nishi IC	National Route 8 (Kanazawa Bypass); Pref. Route 197 (Jichūnishi Kanazawa Route)	172.5			Kanazawa	Ishikawa
17	Kanazawa-higashi IC	National Route 8 (Kanazawa Bypass)	180.1			Kanazawa	Ishikawa
17-1	Kanazawa-morimoto IC	National Route 159 (Kanazawa Tōbu Kanjō Road); National Route 304; National Route 359	183.4			Kanazawa	Ishikawa
PA	Fudōji PA		184.7			Kanazawa	Ishikawa
18	Oyabe IC	Pref. Route 42 (Oyabe Fukumitsu Route)	197.7			Oyabe	Toyama
SA	Oyabegawa SA		199.8			Oyabe	Toyama
19	Oyabe-Tonami JCT	Tōkai-Hokuriku Expressway; Nōetsu Expressway	203.1			Oyabe	Toyama
19	Oyabe-Tonami JCT	Tōkai-Hokuriku Expressway; Nōetsu Expressway	203.1			Tonami	Toyama
20	Tonami IC	National Route 359	207.1			Tonami	Toyama
20-1	Takaoka-Tonami SIC		212.9	○		Tonami	Toyama
PA	Takaoka PA		216.1			Takaoka	Toyama
21	Kosugi IC	National Route 472	221.5			Imizu	Toyama
PA	Kureha PA		224.5			Imizu	Toyama
21-1	Toyama-nishi IC	Pref. Route 41 (Shinminato Hiraoka Route)	226.6			Toyama	Toyama
22	Toyama IC	National Route 41	234.1			Toyama	Toyama
22-1/ PA	Nagaresugi PA/SIC	Pref. Route 56 (Toyama Kanjō Route)	240.9			Toyama	Toyama
23	Tateyama IC	Pref. Route 3 (Toyama Tateyama Uozu Route)	246.4			Tateyama	Toyama
	Kamiichi SIC	Pref. Route 148 (Kamiichi Mizuhashi Route)	250.6		Opens in December 2020	Kamiichi	Toyama
24	Namerikawa IC	Pref. Route 51 (Minowa Namerikawa Inter Route)	254.5	○		Namerikawa	Toyama
SA	Arisoumi SA		258.2		Maibara-bound	Namerikawa	Toyama
SA	Arisoumi SA		261.6		Niigata-bound	Uozu	Toyama
25	Uozu IC	Pref. Route 52 (Ishigaki Uozu Inter Route)	263.8			Uozu	Toyama
26	Kurobe IC	Pref. Route 53 (Wakaguri Ikuji Route)	273.4	○		Kurobe	Toyama
26-1/ PA	Nyūzen PA/SIC	Pref. Route 63 (Nyūzen Unazuki Route)	277.9			Nyūzen	Toyama
27	Asahi IC	National Route 8	282.1			Asahi	Toyama
PA	Etchūsakai PA		288.4			Asahi	Toyama
28	Oyashirazu IC	National Route 8	299.3			Itoigawa	Niigata
29	Itoigawa IC	National Route 148	311.9			Itoigawa	Niigata
PA	Rendaiji PA		313.5			Itoigawa	Niigata
BS	Hayakawa Bus Stop		318.0	○		Itoigawa	Niigata
30	Nou IC	Pref. Route 246 (Nishitobiyama Nō Route); Pref. Route 88 (Nō Inter Route)	326.5	○		Itoigawa	Niigata
31/SA	Nadachi Tanihama IC/ SA	Pref. Route 87 (Nadachi Tanihama Inter Route)	341.6	○		Jōetsu	Niigata
31-1	Jōetsu JCT	Jōshin-etsu Expressway	351.4			Jōetsu	Niigata
BS	Kida Bus Stop		353.4	○		Jōetsu	Niigata
32	Jōetsu IC	National Route 18 (Jōshin Bypass)	355.8			Jōetsu	Niigata
BS	Kubiki Bus Stop		360.7	○		Jōetsu	Niigata
32-1/ PA	Ōgata PA/SIC	Pref. Route 77 (Jōetsu Kubiki Ōgata Route)	365.3		SIC: Open 06:00-22:00	Jōetsu	Niigata
BS	Katamachi Bus Stop		367.9	○		Jōetsu	Niigata
33	Kakizaki IC	National Route 8 (Kakizaki Bypass)	373.8	○		Jōetsu	Niigata
34/SA	Yoneyama IC/ SA	National Route 8	385.2		SA: Niigata-bound	Kashiwazaki	Niigata
SA	Yoneyama SA		387.2		Maibara-bound	Kashiwazaki	Niigata
BS	Kamigata Bus Stop		393.5	○		Kashiwazaki	Niigata
35	Kashiwazaki IC	National Route 252	397.1			Kashiwazaki	Niigata
BS	Sochi Bus Stop		402.8	○		Kashiwazaki	Niigata
PA	Kariwa PA		405.8			Kariwa	Niigata
36	Nishiyama IC	Pref. Route 23 (Kashiwazaki Takahama Horinouchi Route); Pref. Route 393 (Raihai Nagaoka Route)	407.8	○		Kashiwazaki	Niigata
PA	Ōzumi PA		414.9	○		Nagaoka	Niigata
37	Nagaoka JCT	Kan-Etsu Expressway	421.6			Nagaoka	Niigata
BS	Nagaoka-kita Bus Stop		423.9	○		Nagaoka	Niigata
38	Nakanoshima-Mitsuke IC	National Route 8 (Mitsuke Bypass)	432.1			Nagaoka	Niigata
38-1/ PA	Sakae PA/SIC		441.5	○		Sanjō	Niigata
39	Sanjō-Tsubame IC	National Route 289	447.4	○		Tsubame	Niigata
40	Maki-Katahigashi IC	Pref. Route 9 (Nagaoka Tochio Maki Route); National Route 460	457.7	○		Nishikan-ku, Niigata	Niigata
40-1/ PA	Kurosaki PA/SIC	Pref. Route 44 (Niigata Tsubame Route); Pref. Route 46 (Niigata Chūō Kanjō Route)	467.1		SIC: Open 06:00-22:00	Nishi-ku, Niigata	Niigata
BS	Toppara Bus Stop		471.0	○		Nishi-ku, Niigata	Niigata
41	Niigata-nishi IC	National Route 116 (Niigata Bypass)	473.0			Nishi-ku, Niigata	Niigata
42	Niigata-Chūō JCT	Ban-etsu Expressway	476.5			Kōnan-ku, Niigata	Niigata
Through to Nihonkai-Tōhoku Expressway
