= Tōkai-Hokuriku Expressway =

Expressway in Japan

Tōkai-Hokuriku Expressway
- 東海北陸自動車道

Route information
- Length: 185 km (115 mi)
- Existed: 1986–present

Major junctions
- From: Ichinomiya Junction in Ichinomiya, Aichi; Meishin Expressway
- To: Oyabe-Tonami Junction in Oyabe and Tonami, Toyama; Nōetsu Expressway; Hokuriku Expressway

Location
- Country: Japan
- Major cities: Kakamigahara, Gifu, Seki, Gujō, Takayama, Hida, Nanto, Tonami

Highway system
- National highways of Japan; Expressways of Japan

The Tōkai-Hokuriku Expressway (東海北陸自動車道, Tōkaihokuriku Jidōsha-dō) is a national expressway in the Chūbu region on the island of Honshū in Japan. It is managed by Central Nippon Expressway Company. The route is signed E41 under the Ministry of Land, Infrastructure, Transport and Tourism's "2016 Proposal for Realization of Expressway Numbering."

== Overview ==
Tōkai and Hokuriku are the names of the two regions of Japan that are linked by the expressway.

The expressway begins at a junction with the Meishin Expressway to the northwest of the Nagoya urban area and follows a northerly course into Gifu Prefecture, passing the capital Gifu and heading further north into the mountainous Hida region. The expressway also passes by Shirakawa-gō and Gokayama, two UNESCO World Heritage Sites straddling the border between Gifu Prefecture and Toyama Prefecture. The expressway continues north through western Toyama Prefecture to its terminus at a junction with the Hokuriku Expressway and the Nōetsu Expressway.

The first section of the expressway was opened to traffic in 1986. The final section of the expressway (25 km between Hida-Kiyomi Interchange and Shirakawagō Interchange) was opened on July 5, 2008. A major component of this section is the Hida Tunnel, the second longest road tunnel in Japan after the Kan-Etsu Tunnel. A total of 1.22 trillion yen was spent on planning and construction of the expressway over 36 years.

The expressway is 4 lanes from Ichinomiya Junction to Fukubegatake Parking Area, and 2 lanes on all other sections. Construction to expand the route to 4 lanes is currently underway on the section between Fukubegatake Parking Area and Shirotori Interchange. The speed limit is 80 km/h on 4-laned sections and 70 km/h on 2-laned sections.

== Features ==
At 1,086 meters, Matsunoki Pass between Shōkawa Interchange and Hida-Kiyomi Interchange is the highest point in the national expressway network. A parking area is planned to open at this point.

There are a total of 54 tunnels either completed or under construction. After the Hida Tunnel, the Hakamagoshi Tunnel (between Fukumitsu Interchange and Gokayama Interchange) is the longest. Trucks carrying hazardous materials are forbidden from using the tunnel and must use alternate routes.

The piers on the Washimi Bridge (between Shōkawa Interchange and Takasu Interchange) are the tallest in Japan, at 118 m.

== List of interchanges and features ==
- IC - interchange, SIC - smart interchange, JCT - junction, SA - service area, PA - parking area, BS - bus stop, TN - tunnel, BR - bridge

No.	Name	Connections	Dist. from Origin (km)	Bus Stop	Notes	Location	
1	Ichinomiya-Inazawa-kita IC	Pref. Route 14 (Gifu Inazawa Route) (Nishi-Owari Chūō Road)				Ichinomiya	Aichi
25-1	Ichinomiya JCT	Meishin Expressway	0.0			Ichinomiya	Aichi
1-1	Ichinomiya-nishi IC	Pref. Route 14 (Gifu Inazawa Route)	1.0		Gifu-bound exit, Ichinomiya JCT-bound entrance only	Ichinomiya	Aichi
2	Bisai IC	Pref. Route 148 (Hagiwara Sanjō Kitagata Route)	3.9		Ichinomiya JCT-bound exit, Gifu-bound entrance only	Ichinomiya	Aichi
3	Ichinomiya-Kisogawa IC	National Route 22 (Meigi Bypass)	7.7			Ichinomiya	Aichi
PA	Kawashima PA		11.3		Highway Oasis	Kakamigahara	Gifu
4	Gifu-Kakamigahara IC	National Route 21 (Naka Bypass)	13.3			Kakamigahara	Gifu
BS	Sohara BS		18.8	○		Gifu	Gifu
5	Seki IC	National Route 248 (Seki Bypass)	25.5			Seki	Gifu
BS	Kose BS		27.8	○		Seki	Gifu
SA	Seki SA		28.0		Gifu-bound only	Seki	Gifu
SA	Nagaragawa SA		30.1		Takayama-bound only	Seki	Gifu
5-1	Mino-Seki JCT	Tōkai-Kanjō Expressway	31.1			Seki	Gifu
6	Mino IC	Pref. Route 94 (Gifu Mino Route)	32.4	○		Mino	Gifu
PA	Kojōzan PA		38.4		Mino-bound only	Mino	Gifu
7	Minami IC	National Route 156	49.6	○		Gujō	Gifu
PA	Fukubegatake PA		50.8		Takayama-bound only	Gujō	Gifu
8	Gujō-Hachiman IC	National Route 156	59.8	○		Gujō	Gifu
-	Hachiman JCT	Nōbi-Ōdan Expressway			Planned	Gujō	Gifu
9/PA	Gifu-Yamato IC/PA	Pref. Route 52 (Shirotori Itadori Route)	66.0	○		Gujō	Gifu
10	Shirotori IC	Chūbu-Jūkan Expressway; Pref. Route 82 (Shirotori Meihō Route)	76.4			Gujō	Gifu
11	Takasu IC	Pref. Route 45 (Takasu Inter Route)	84.4			Gujō	Gifu
11-1/SA	Hiruganokōgen SA/ SIC	Pref. Route 321 (Hiruganokōgen Route)	91.5	○		Gujō	Gifu
12	Shōkawa IC	National Route 158	98.3			Takayama	Gifu
PA	Matsunokitōge PA		109.2; 109.5		Oyabe-bound; Ichinomiya-bound	Takayama	Gifu
13	Hida-Kiyomi IC/ JCT	Chūbu-Jūkan Expressway; National Route 158	117.3			Takayama	Gifu
PA	Hida-Kawai PA		130.2			Hida	Gifu
TN	Hida Tunnel				Length - 10,712 m	Hida	Gifu
TN	Hida Tunnel				Length - 10,712 m	Shirakawa	Gifu
14	Shirakawagō IC	National Route 156	142.2			Shirakawa	Gifu
PA	Hida-Shirakawa PA		143.6; 143.5		Oyabe-bound; Ichinomiya-bound	Shirakawa	Gifu
15	Gokayama IC	National Route 156	157.4			Nanto	Toyama
TN	Hakamagoshi Tunnel		165.3		Length - 5,939 m, dangerous goods forbidden	Nanto	Toyama
SA	Jōhana SA/ SIC		169.9	○	Highway Oasis; SIC open in 2019	Nanto	Toyama
16	Fukumitsu IC	National Route 304	173.8			Nanto	Toyama
17	Nanto SIC	Pref. Route 279 (Yasui Fukuno Route)	181.4			Nanto	Toyama
19	Oyabe-Tonami JCT	Hokuriku Expressway	184.8			Tonami	Toyama
19	Oyabe-Tonami JCT	Hokuriku Expressway	184.8			Oyabe	Toyama
Through to Nōetsu Expressway

== Gallery ==
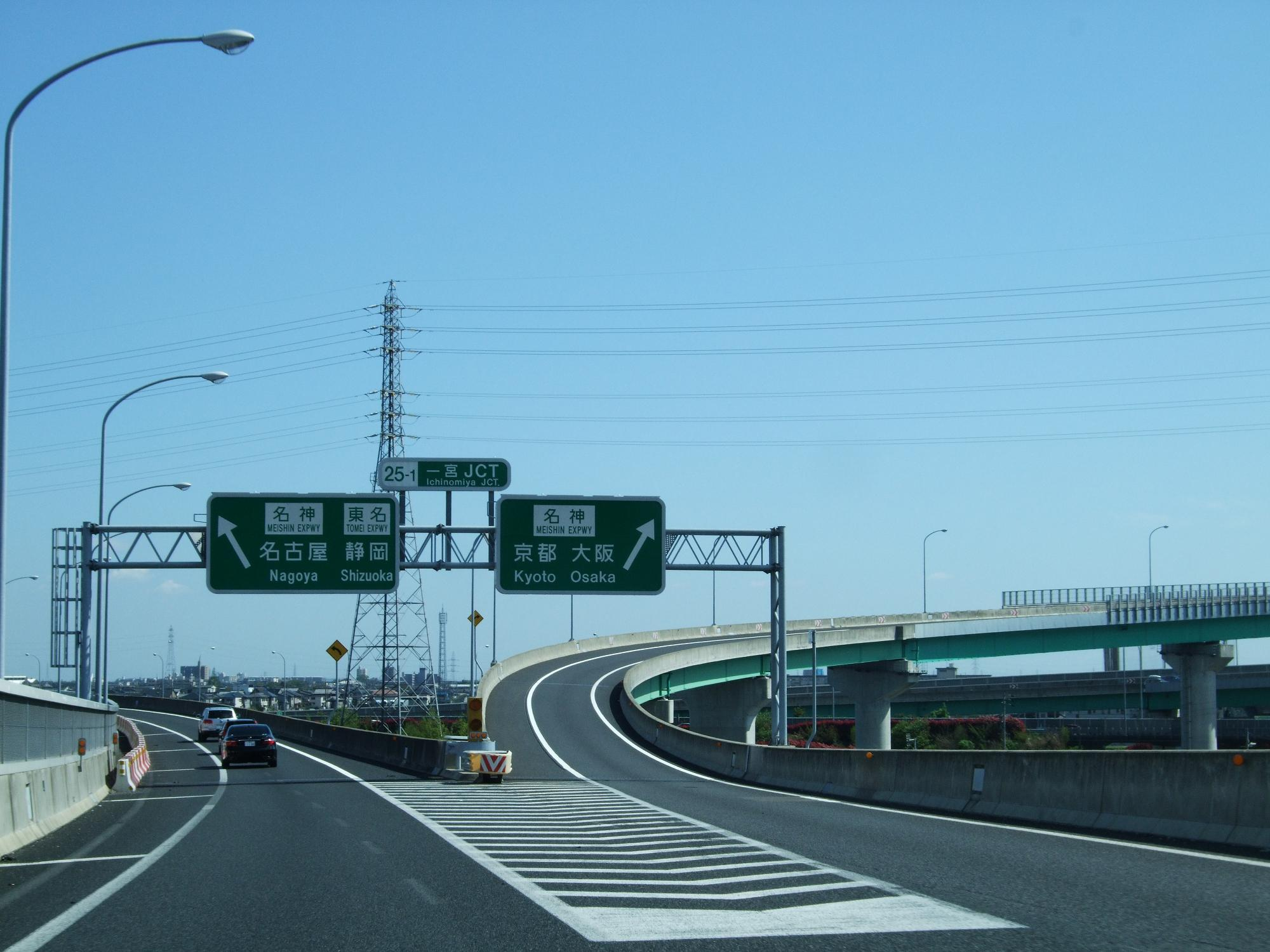
Ichinomiya Junction southbound

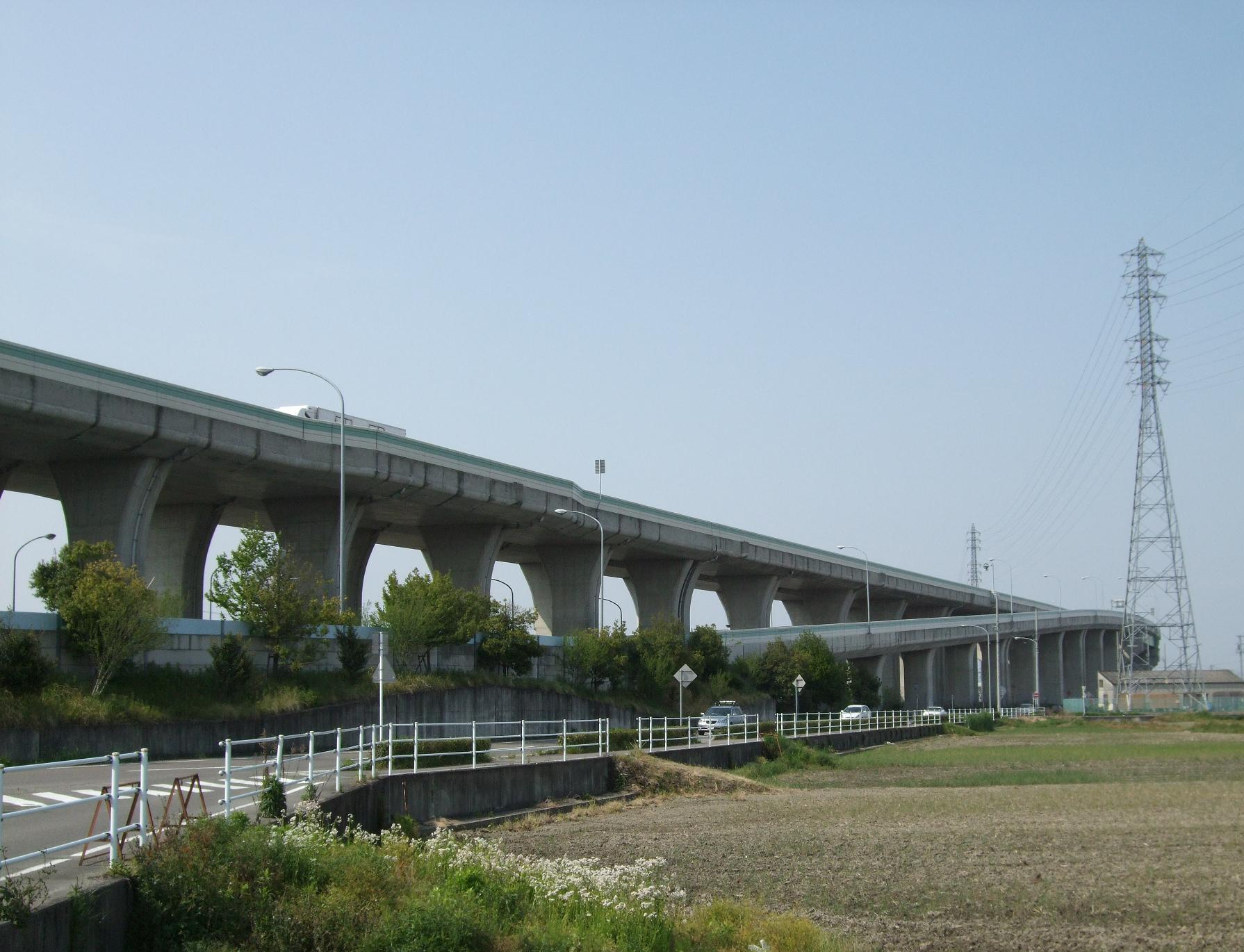
Bisai Interchange

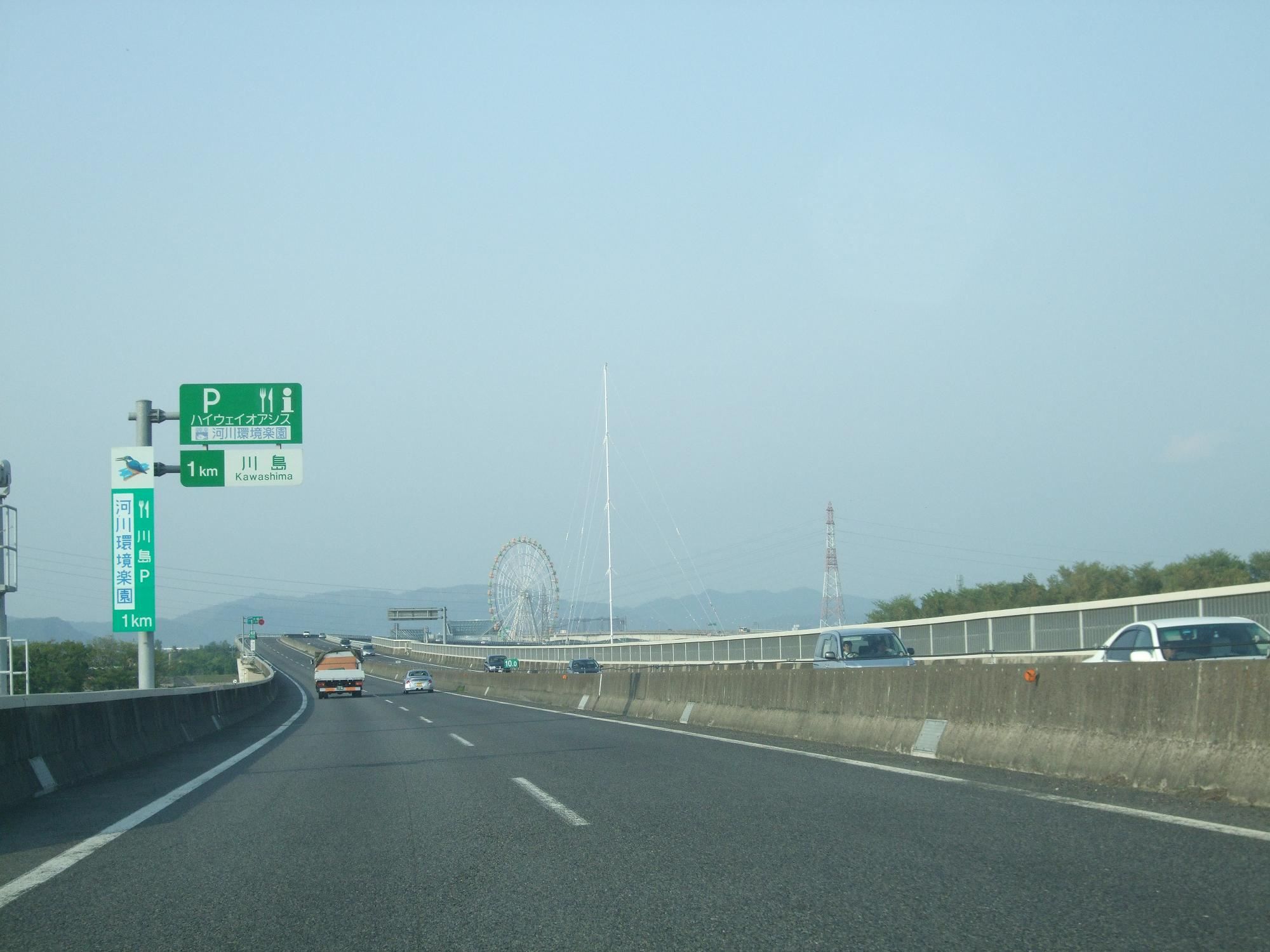
Near Kawashima Parking Area

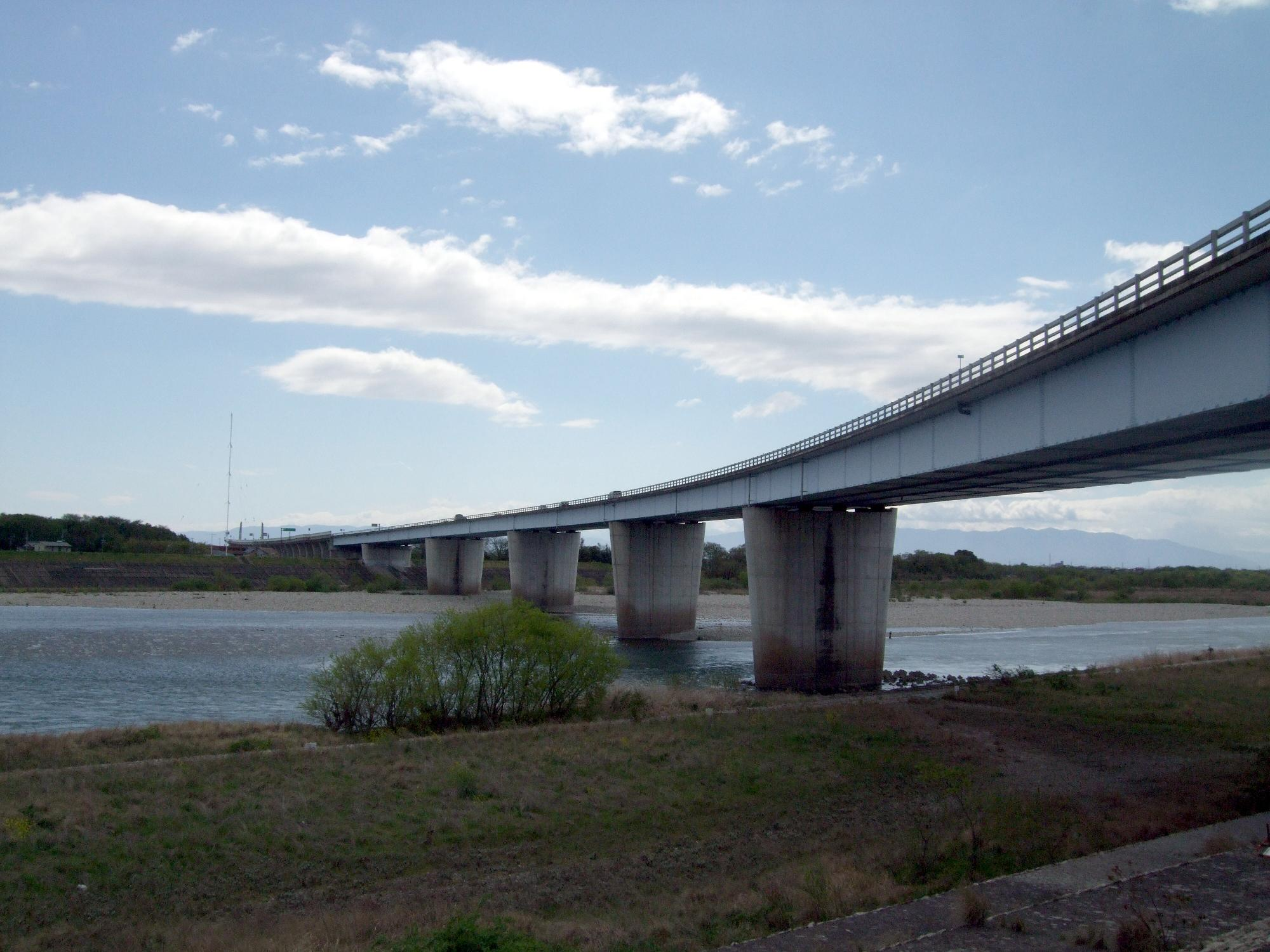
Bridge over the Kiso River

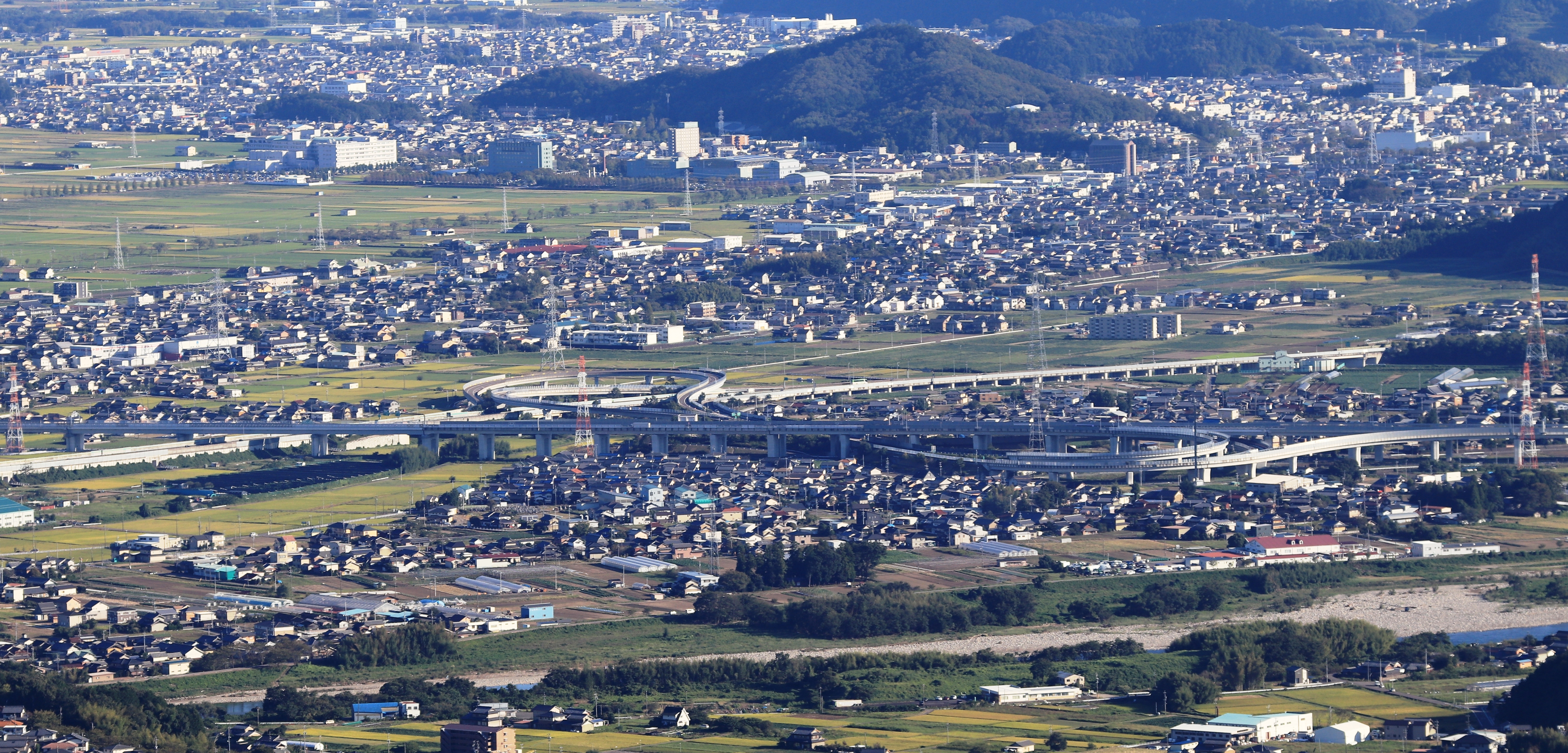
Mino-Seki Junction southbound

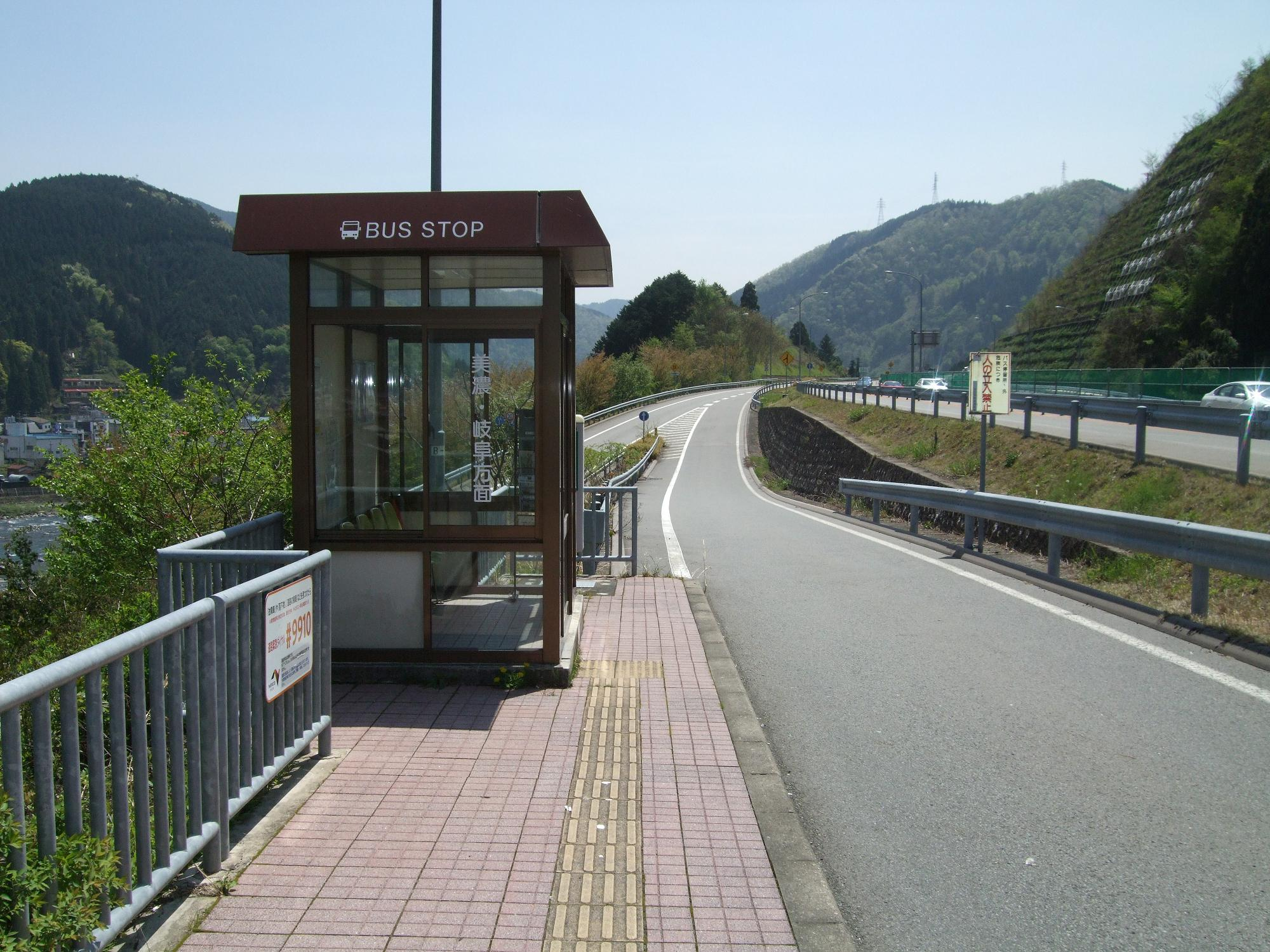
Gujō-Hachiman Bus Stop

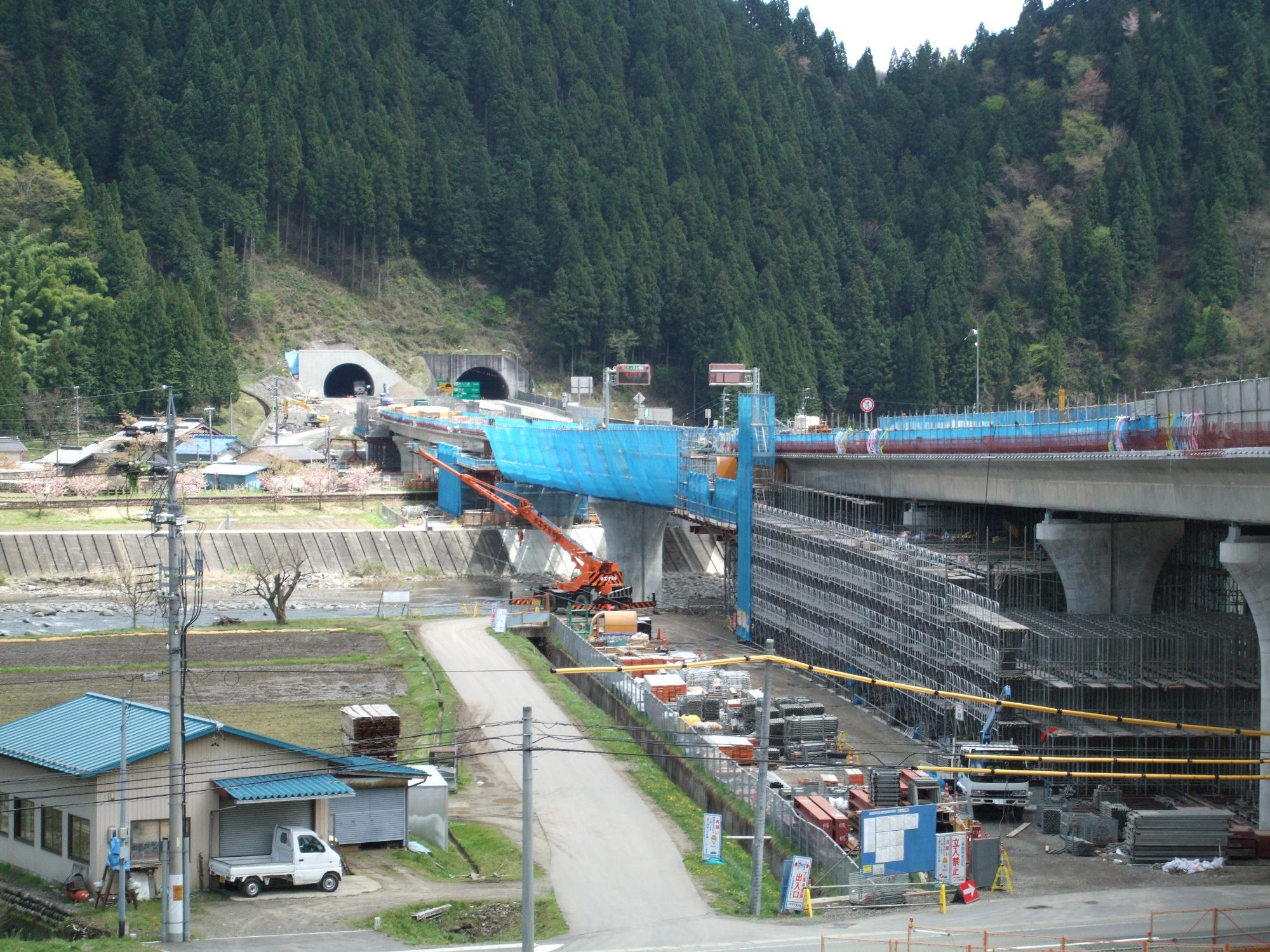
Construction work to expand to 4 lanes near Gifu-Yamato Interchange

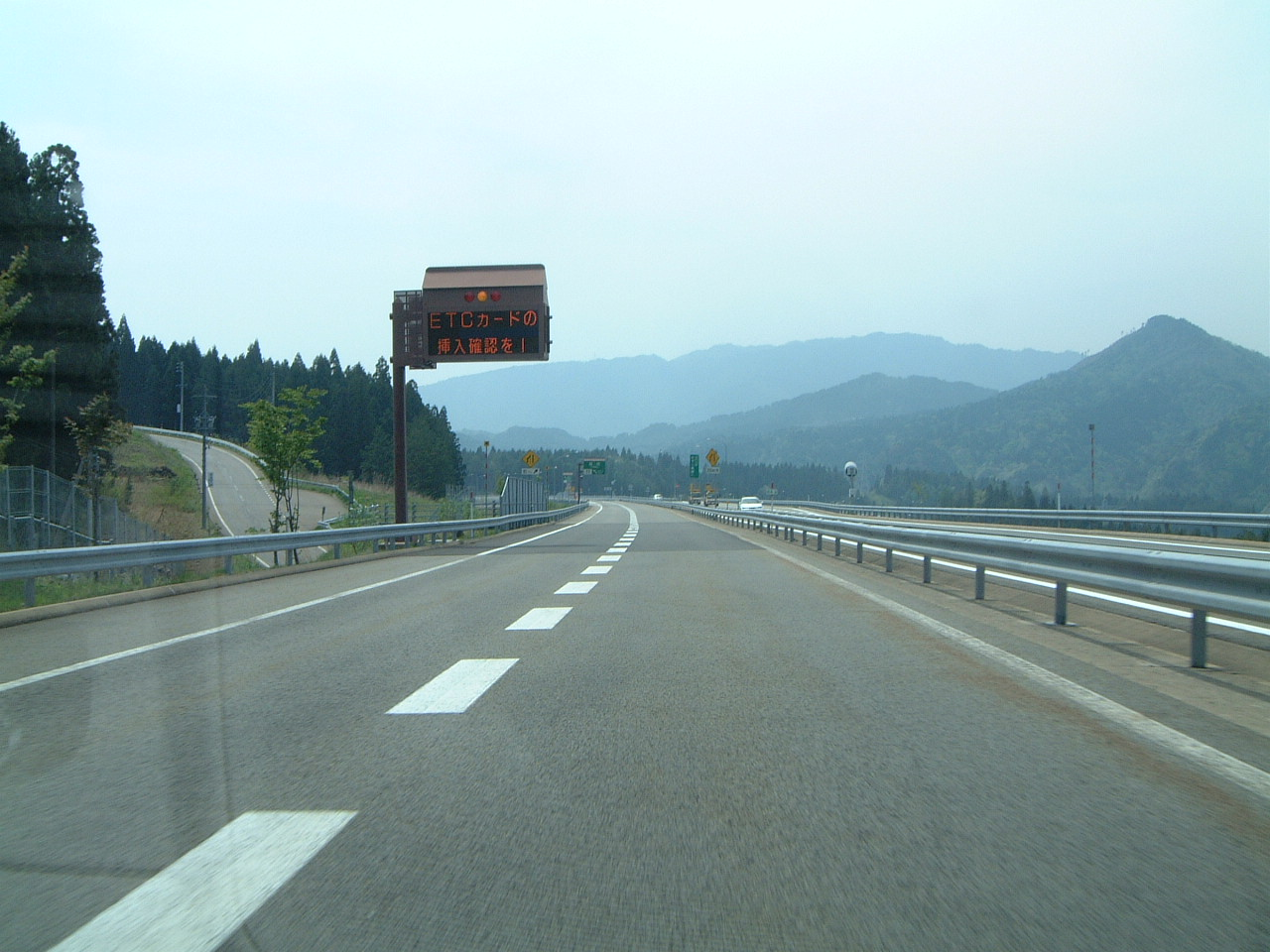
Near Takasu Interchange

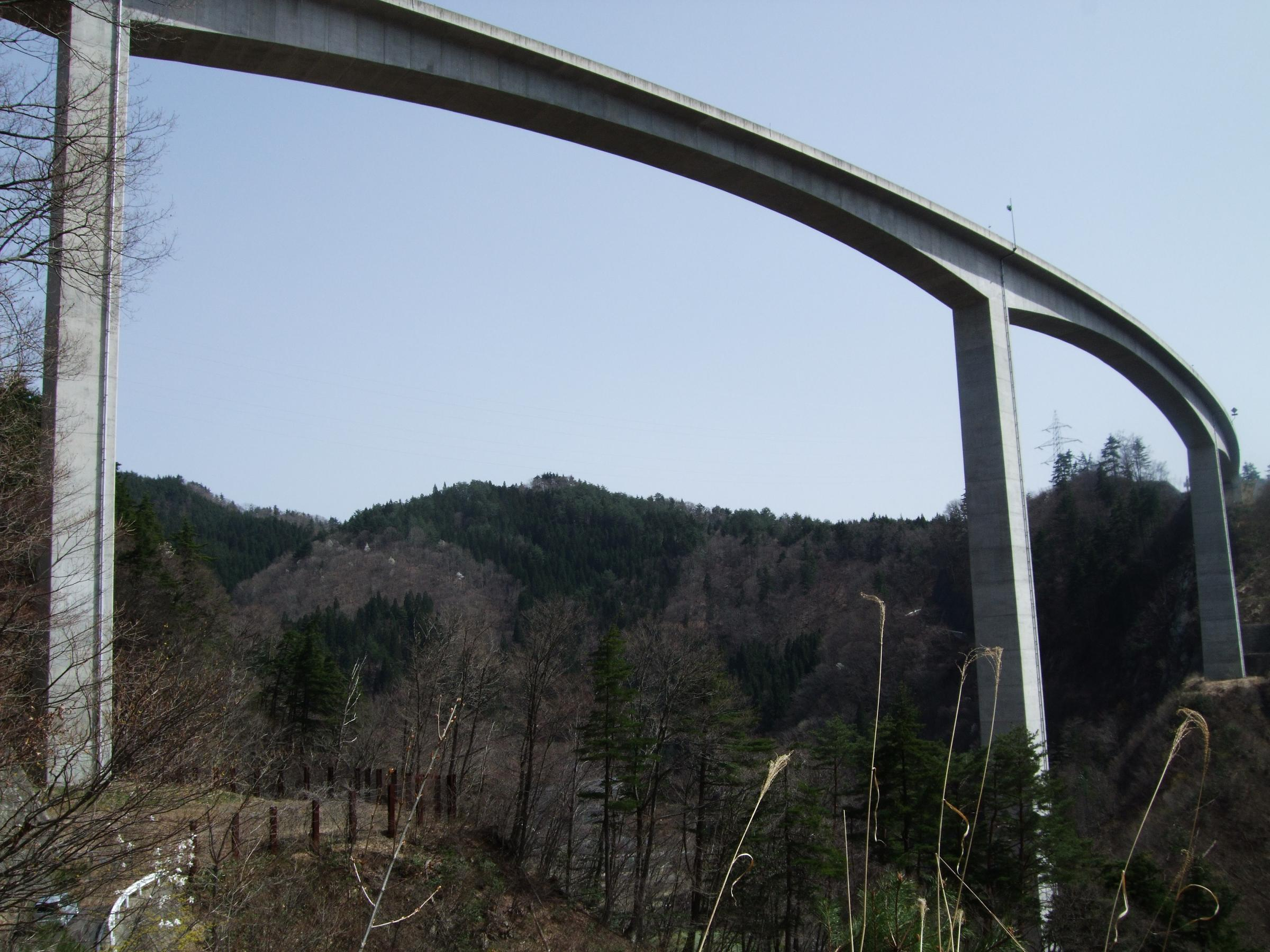
Washimi Bridge

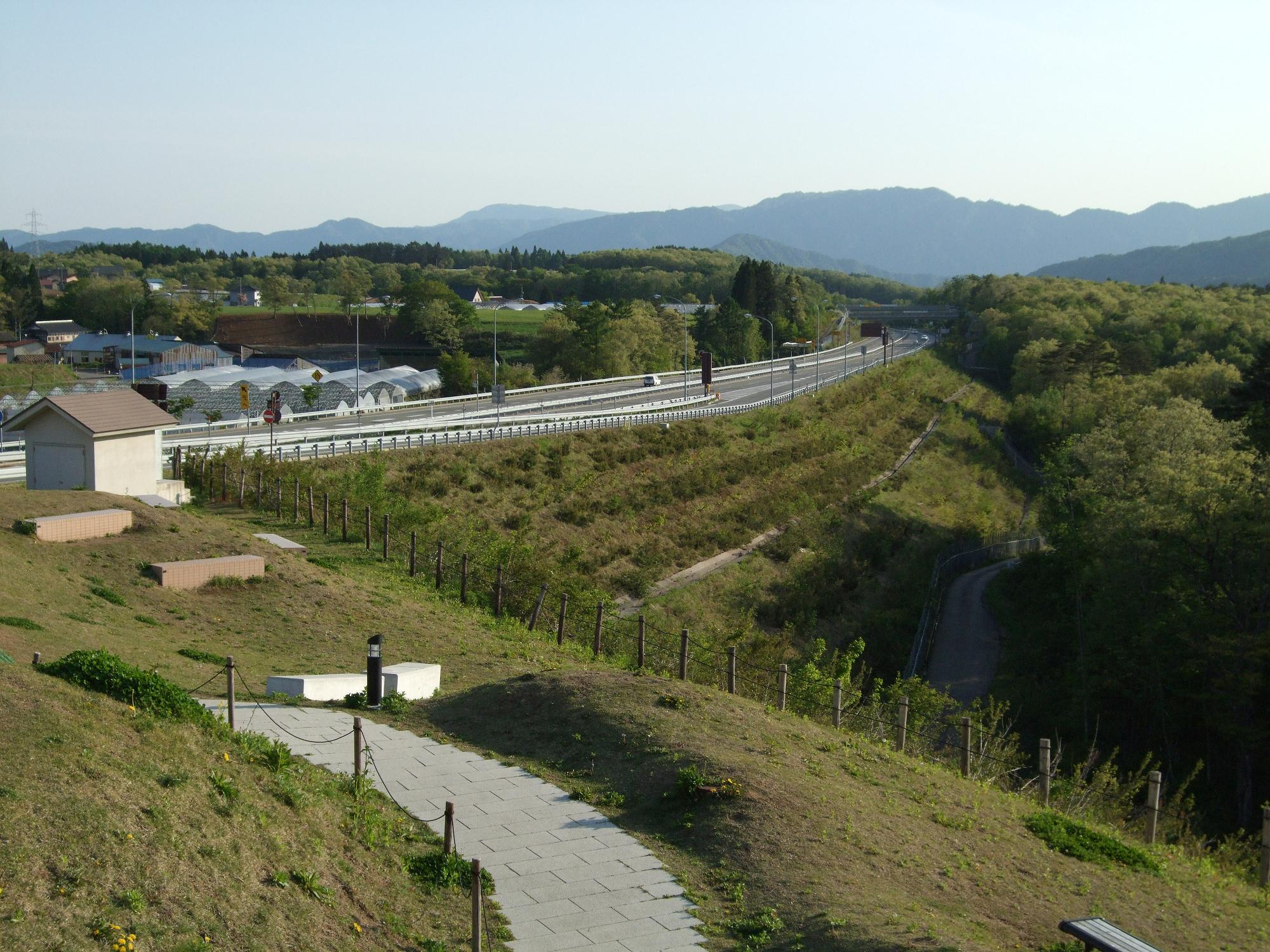
View from Hiruganokōgen Service Area facing south

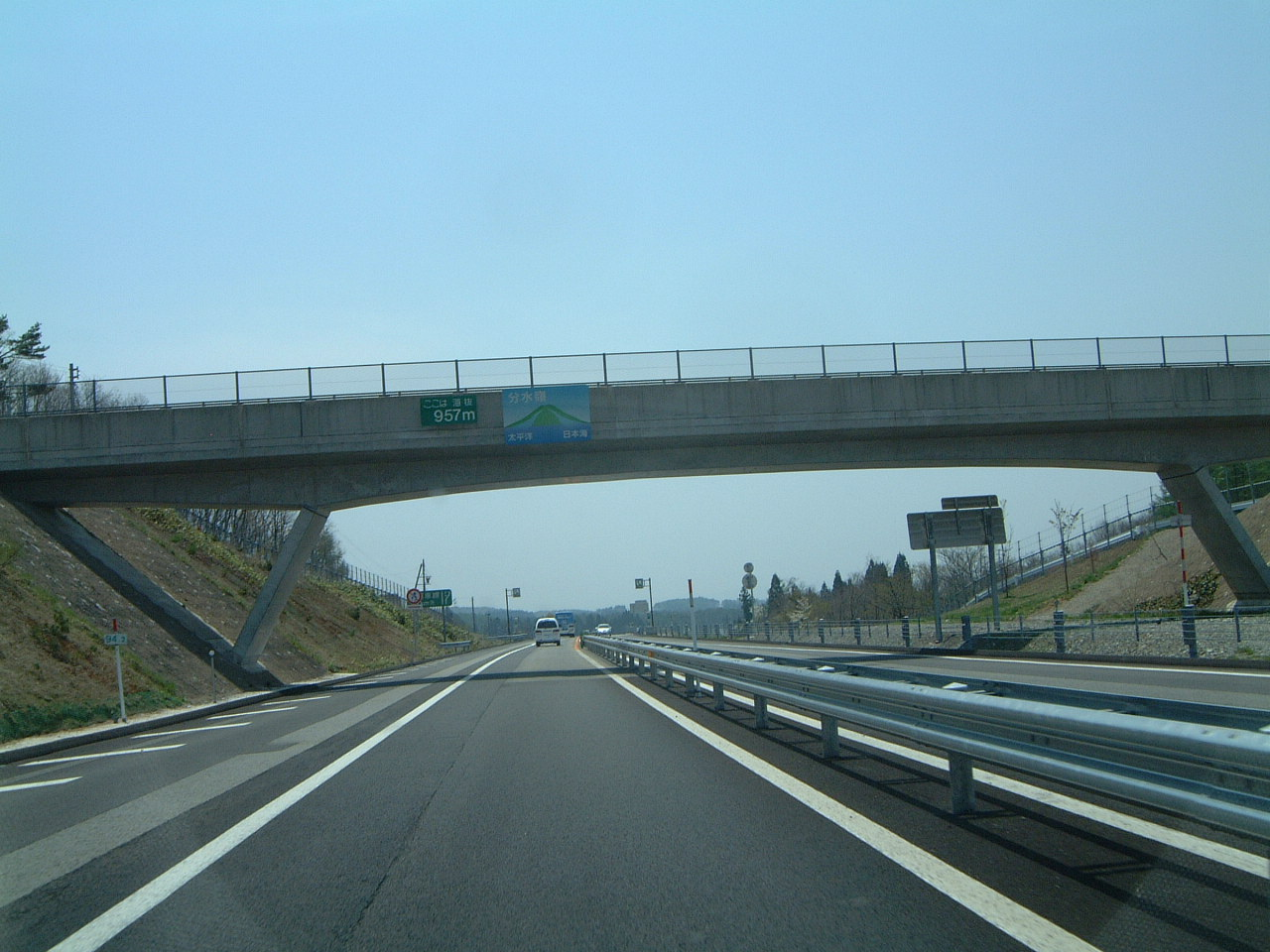
Pacific Ocean-Japan Sea watershed boundary near Hiruganokōgen Service Area

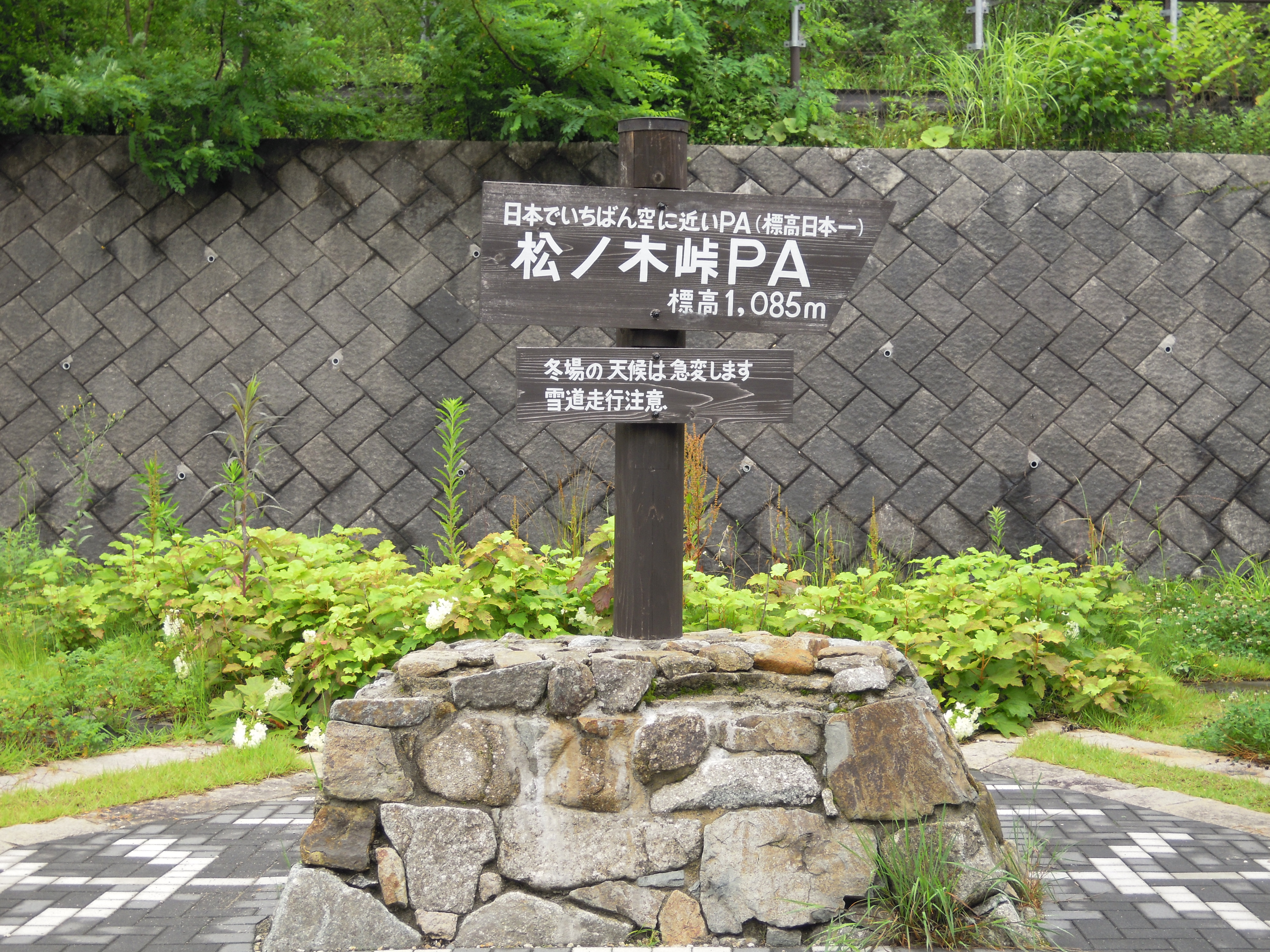
Highest Parking Area mark at Matsunokitōge Parking Area

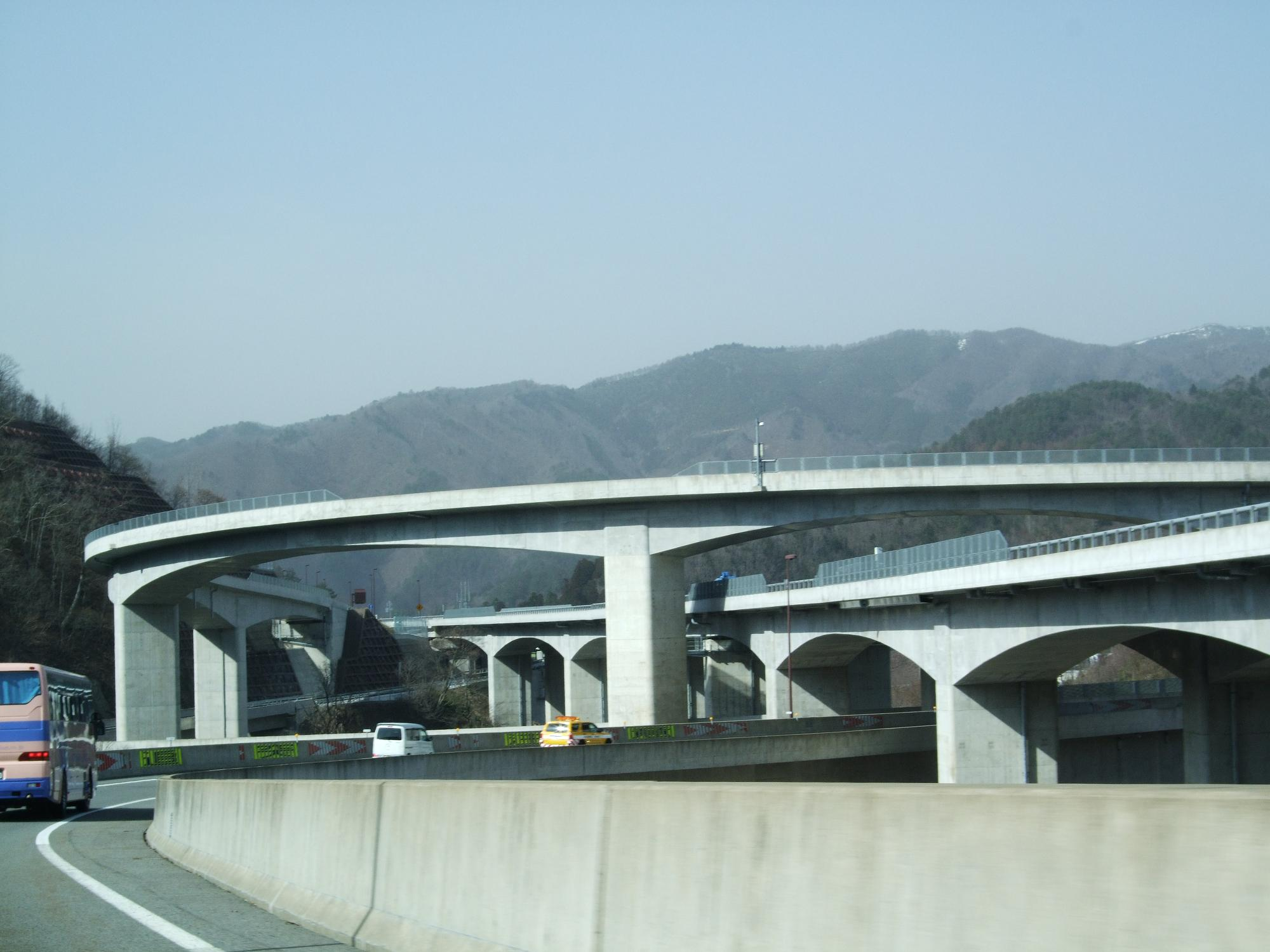
Hida-Kiyomi Interchange

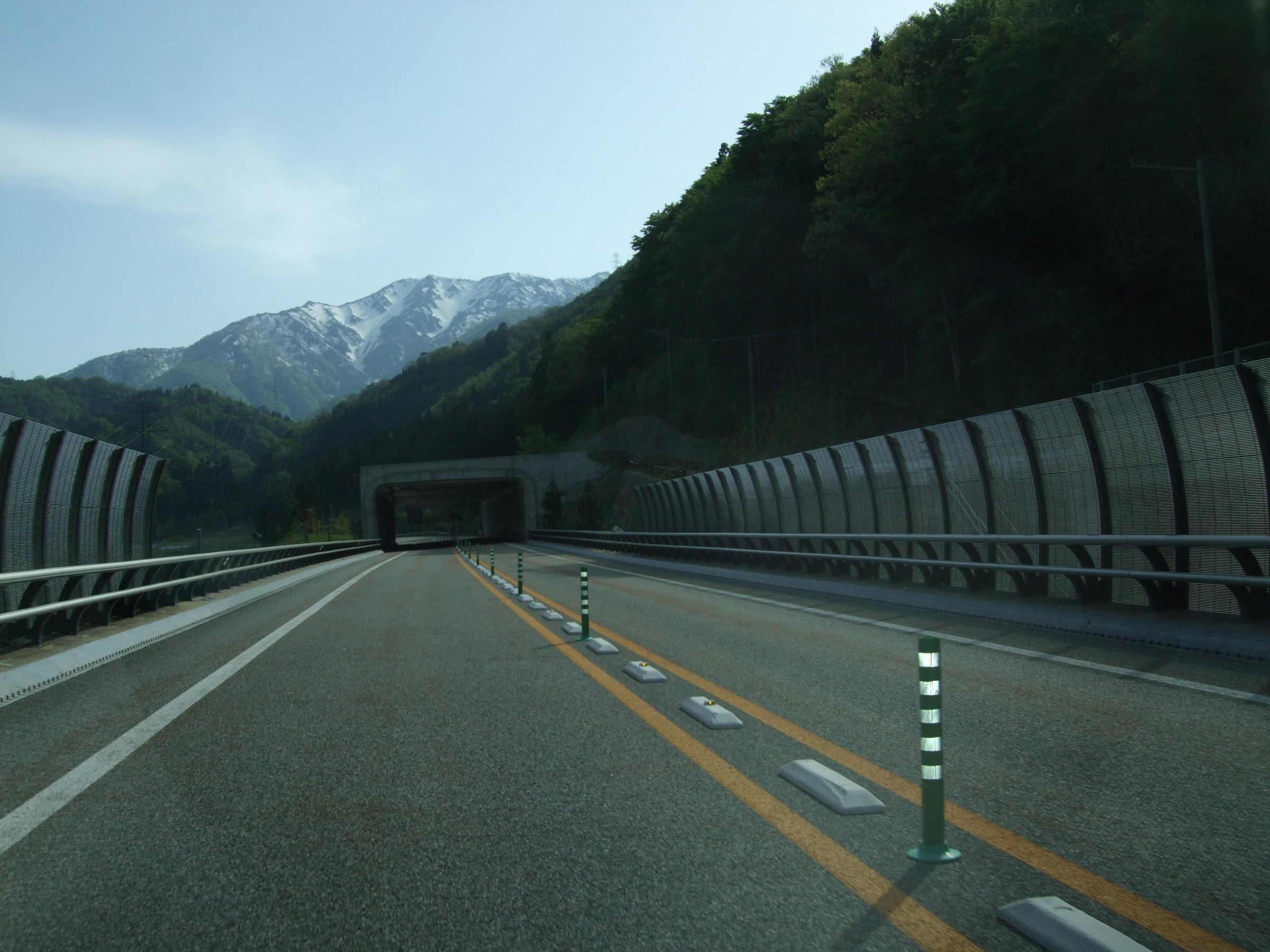
Near Shirakawagō Interchange

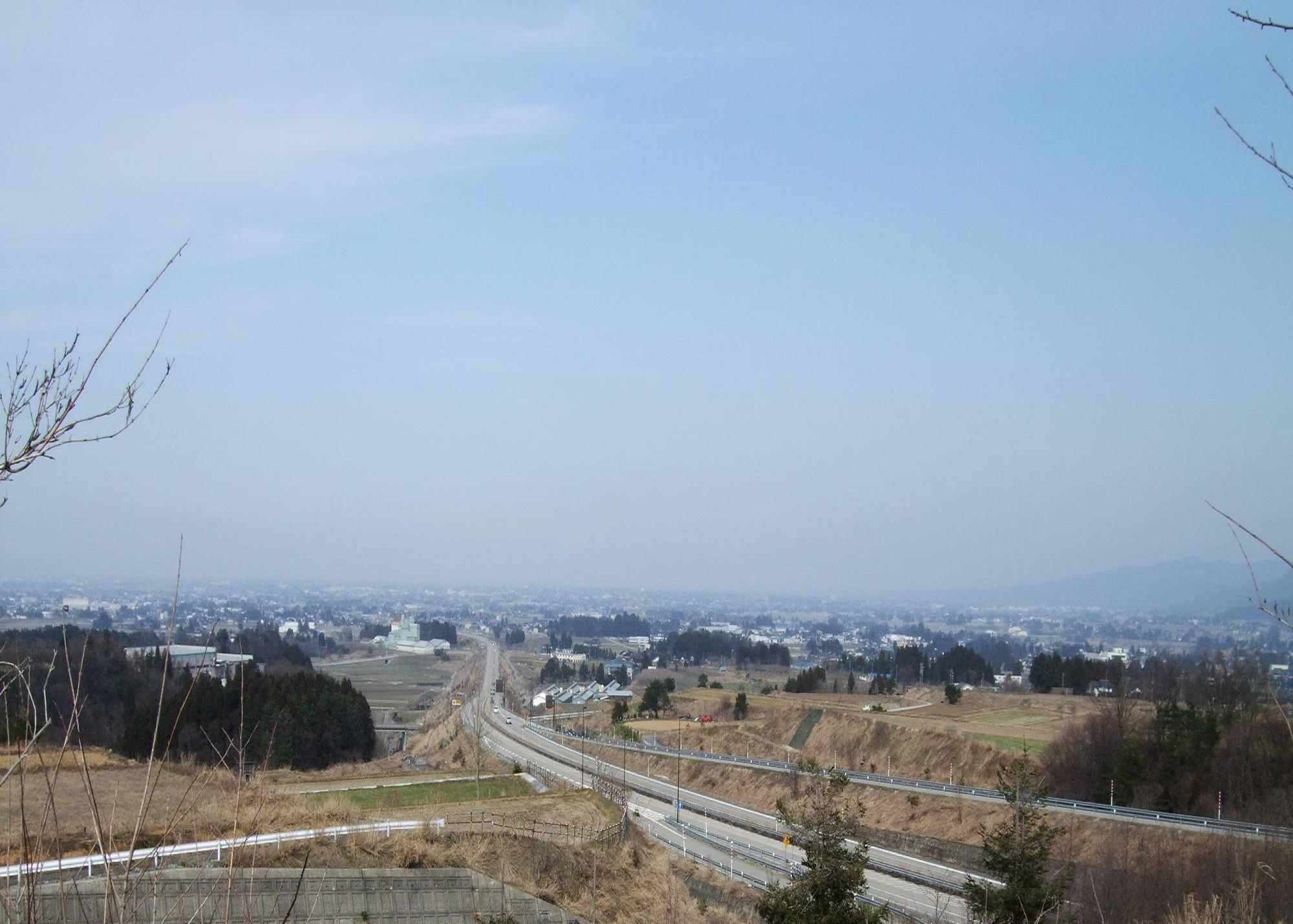
View from Jōhana Service Area facing north
