= Sakai River =

Sakai River may refer to various rivers in Japan:

- Sakai River (Gifu)
- Sakai River (Ōita), a river that flows through Beppu, Ōita Prefecture, Kyushu
- Sakai River (Tokyo, Kanagawa)
