= Hida Tunnel =

Road tunnel in Gifu prefecture, Japan

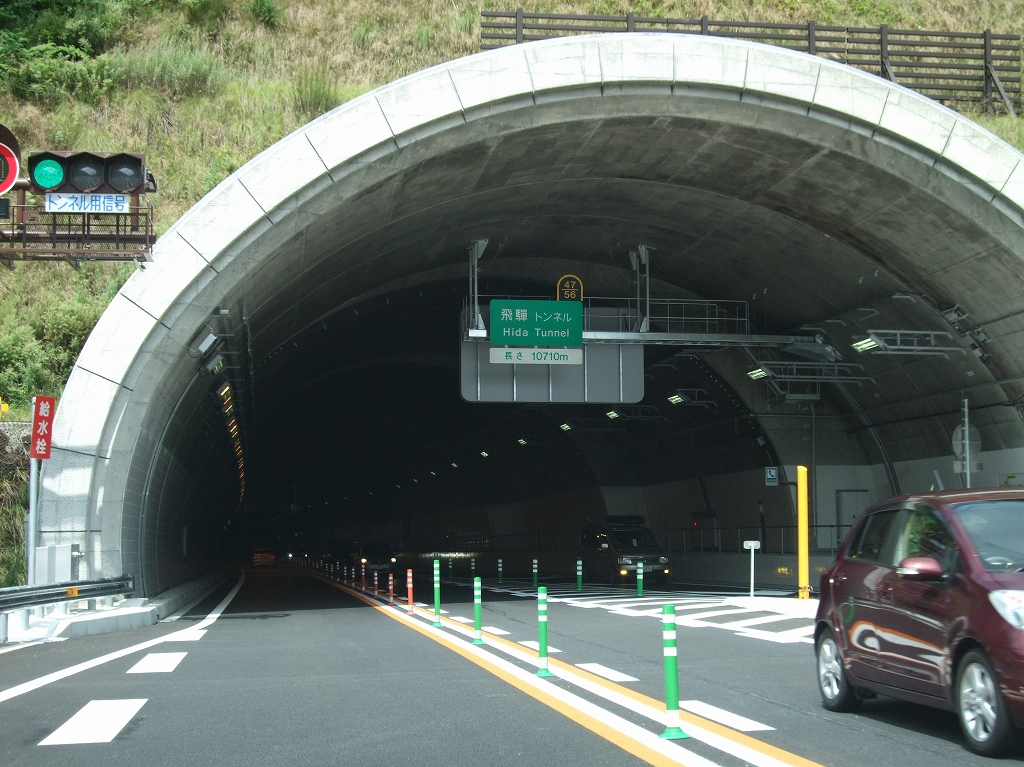
- Hida Tunnel in Gifu prefecture
- Interactive map of Hida Tunnel

Overview
- Line: Tōkai-Hokuriku Expressway
- Location: between Hida, Gifu and Shirakawa, Gifu Prefecture
- Coordinates: 36°14′1″N 136°57′16″E
- Status: active

Operation
- Traffic: Expressway Toll-Road
- Character: Passenger and Freight

Technical
- Line length: 10.7 km (6.6 mi)
- No. of tracks: 2

Hida Tunnel (飛騨トンネル) is a tunnel on the Tōkai-Hokuriku Expressway (E41) in Japan that runs (through the Mominukasan mountain, 籾糠山) from Hida city to Shirakawa village in Gifu prefecture with approximate length of 10.7 km. It was completed and opened in 2008, and it is the third longest road tunnel in Japan after the Yamate Tunnel (Chuoto Expressway Central Loop Line) and Kanetsu Tunnel (Kanetsu Expressway), and the 12th longest in the world.

== See also ==
- List of tunnels in Japan
- Seikan Tunnel Tappi Shakō Line
- Sakhalin–Hokkaido Tunnel
- Bohai Strait tunnel
