= Chūbu-Jūkan Expressway =

Expressway in Japan

Chūbu-Jūkan Expressway
- 中部縦貫自動車道

Route information
- Maintained by Ministry of Land, Infrastructure, Transport and Tourism
- Length: 143.9 km (89.4 mi)
- Existed: 1987–present
- Component highways: National Route 158

Major junctions
- East end: Nakanoyu Interchange; National Route 158 in Matsumoto
- West end: Fukui-kita Junction; Hokuriku Expressway in Fukui

Location
- Country: Japan

Highway system
- National highways of Japan; Expressways of Japan

The Chūbu-Jūkan Expressway (中部縦貫自動車道, Chūbu-Jūkan Jidōsha-dō) is an incomplete national expressway in Nagano Prefecture, Gifu Prefecture, and Fukui Prefecture. It is owned and operated primarily by the Ministry of Land, Infrastructure, Transport and Tourism (MLIT), but also has sections maintained and tolled by the Central Nippon Expressway Company in Nagano and Gifu. The route is signed E67 under MLIT's "2016 Proposal for Realization of Expressway Numbering."

== Naming ==
The name for the expressway, Chūbu-Jūkan, is simply descriptive of its function in the region it serves, as it crosses through (縦貫, jūkan) the Chūbu region (中部地方, Chūbu-chihō).

== History ==
The first section of the road was built over the Aburasaka Pass between Fukui and Gifu prefectures in 1987. Since then it has been expanded in short segments with the most recent section opening at its western terminus at the Hokuriku Expressway in the city of Fukui in 2017.

== Junction list ==
Prefecture	Location	km	mi	Exit	Name	Destinations	Notes
Nagano	Matsumoto	0	0.0	4	Matsumoto	Nagano Expressway	Under construction
Nagano	Matsumoto	Gap in the expressway, connection is made by National Route 158					
Nagano	Matsumoto	0	0.0	—	Nakanoyu	Abo Toge Road National Route 158 – Kamikōchi, Central Matsumoto	At-grade junction, current eastern terminus of the expressway
Gifu	Takayama	5.6	3.5	—	Hirayu	National Route 158 / National Route 471 – Hida, Gero, Central Takayama	At-grade junction
Gifu	Takayama	Gap in the expressway, connection is made by National Route 158 and National Route 41					
Gifu	Takayama	9.5	5.9	—	Takayama	Takayama-Kokufu Bypass National Route 41 – Toyama, Hida, Gero, Central Takayama	
Gifu	Takayama	16.0	9.9	—	Takayama-nishi	National Route 158 – Shōkawa, Takayama	
Gifu	Takayama	24.7	15.3	13	Hida-Kiyomi	Tōkai-Hokuriku Expressway – Gifu, Toyama	Eastern end of concurrency with Tōkai-Hokuriku Expressway
Gifu	Concurrency with Tōkai-Hokuriku Expressway						
Gifu	Gujō	0	0.0	10	Shirotori	Tōkai-Hokuriku Expressway – Gifu, Toyama	Western end of concurrency with Tōkai-Hokuriku Expressway, highway location markers reset to zero.
Gifu	Gujō	3.2	2.0	—	Shirotori-nishi	Mino Highway National Route 158 – Fukui, Ōno, Shirotori	
Fukui	Ōno	11.3	7.0	—	Aburasaka-Toge	Mino Highway National Route 158 –	Temporary western end of to this section of the expressway
Fukui	Ōno	35 km gap in the expressway, connection is made by National Route 158 and National Route 157					
Fukui	Ōno	46.3	28.8	—	Ōno	Ōno Bypass National Route 157 – Fukui, Central Ōno, Gifu, Katsuyama	Temporary eastern end of to this section of the expressway
Fukui	Katsuyama	54.1	33.6	—	Katsuyama	Fukui Prefecture Route 260 – Fukui Prefectural Dinosaur Museum, Central Katsuyama	
Fukui	Eiheiji	62.0	38.5	—	Kamishihi	National Route 416 – Fukui, Katsuyama, Ōno	
Fukui	Eiheiji	67.3	41.8	—	Eiheiji	National Route 364 – Fukui, Katsuyama	
Fukui	Eiheiji	68.7	42.7	—	Eiheiji-Sandō	Road of Zen National Route 364 – Eihei-ji, Sakai, Katsuyama	Eastbound exit, westbound entrance
Fukui	Eiheiji	70.5	43.8	—	Matsuoka	National Route 416 – Central Eiheiji, Fukui, National Route 8	Westbound exit, eastbound entrance
Fukui	Fukui	72.7	45.2	9	Fukui-kita	Hokuriku Expressway – Maibara, AH1 Meishin Expressway, Kanazawa, Tōkai-Hokuriku Expressway	Western terminus of the expressway
1.000 mi = 1.609 km; 1.000 km = 0.621 mi: Concurrency terminus; Electronic toll collection; Incomplete access; Unopened
