= Ginan Station =

Railway station in Ginan, Gifu Prefecture, Japan

Ginan Station 岐南駅

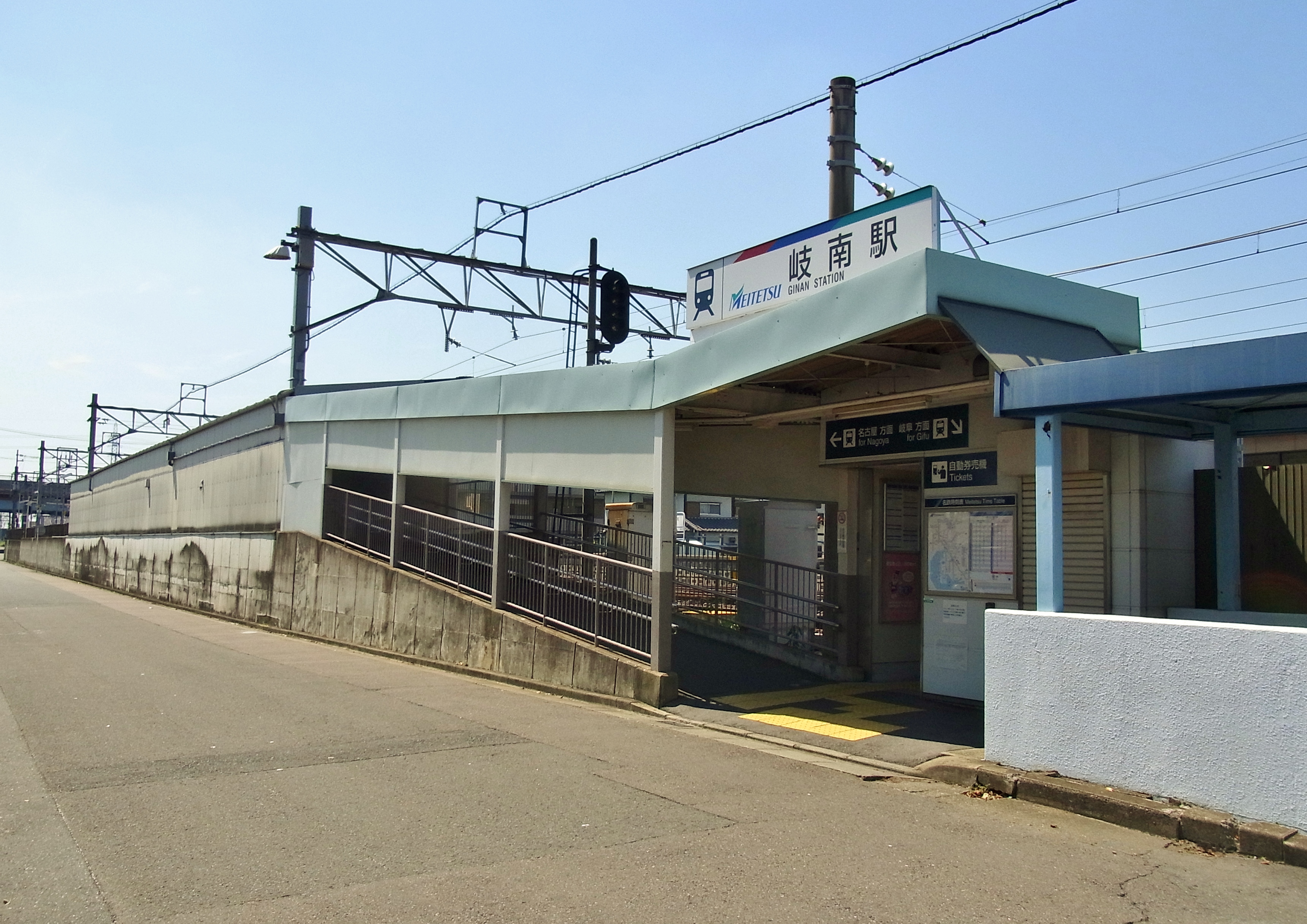
- Ginan Station, September 2009

General information
- Location: 4 Chome Shimoinjiki, Ginan-chō, Hashima-gun, Gifu-ken 501-6018; Japan
- Coordinates: 35.3895°N 136.7689°E
- Operator: Meitetsu
- Line: ■Meitetsu Nagoya Main Line
- Distance: 91.5 km from Toyohashi
- Platforms: 2 side platforms

Other information
- Status: Unstaffed
- Station code: NH57
- Website: Official website (in Japanese)

History
- Opened: 2 June 1914
- Former names: Sakaigawa (to 1980)

Passengers
- FY2013: 1667

Services
Preceding station	Meitetsu	Following station
Kasamatsu towards Toyohashi	Nagoya Main Line Local	Chajo towards Meitetsu Gifu
Location
- Location within Gifu Prefecture Location within Japan

Ginan Station (岐南駅, Ginan-eki) is a railway station located in the town of Ginan, Hashima District, Gifu Prefecture, Japan, operated by the private railway operator Meitetsu.

== Lines ==
Ginan Station is a station on the Nagoya Main Line, and is located 96.9 kilometers from the terminus of the line at Toyohashi.

== Station layout ==
track layout

Ginan Station has two ground-level opposed side platforms connected by an underpass. The station is unattended.

=== Platforms ===
1	■ Meitetsu Nagoya Main Line	For Meitetsu-Gifu
2	■ Meitetsu Nagoya Main Line	For Meitetsu-Ichinomiya, Meitetsu-Nagoya, and Shin-Hashima

== History ==
Ginan Station opened on 2 June 1914 as Sakaigawai Station (境川駅). It was renamed Ginan Station on 20 September 1980.

== Surrounding area ==
- Japan National Route 21

== See also ==
- List of railway stations in Japan
