= Japan National Route 472 =

Road in Japan

National Route 472
- 国道472号
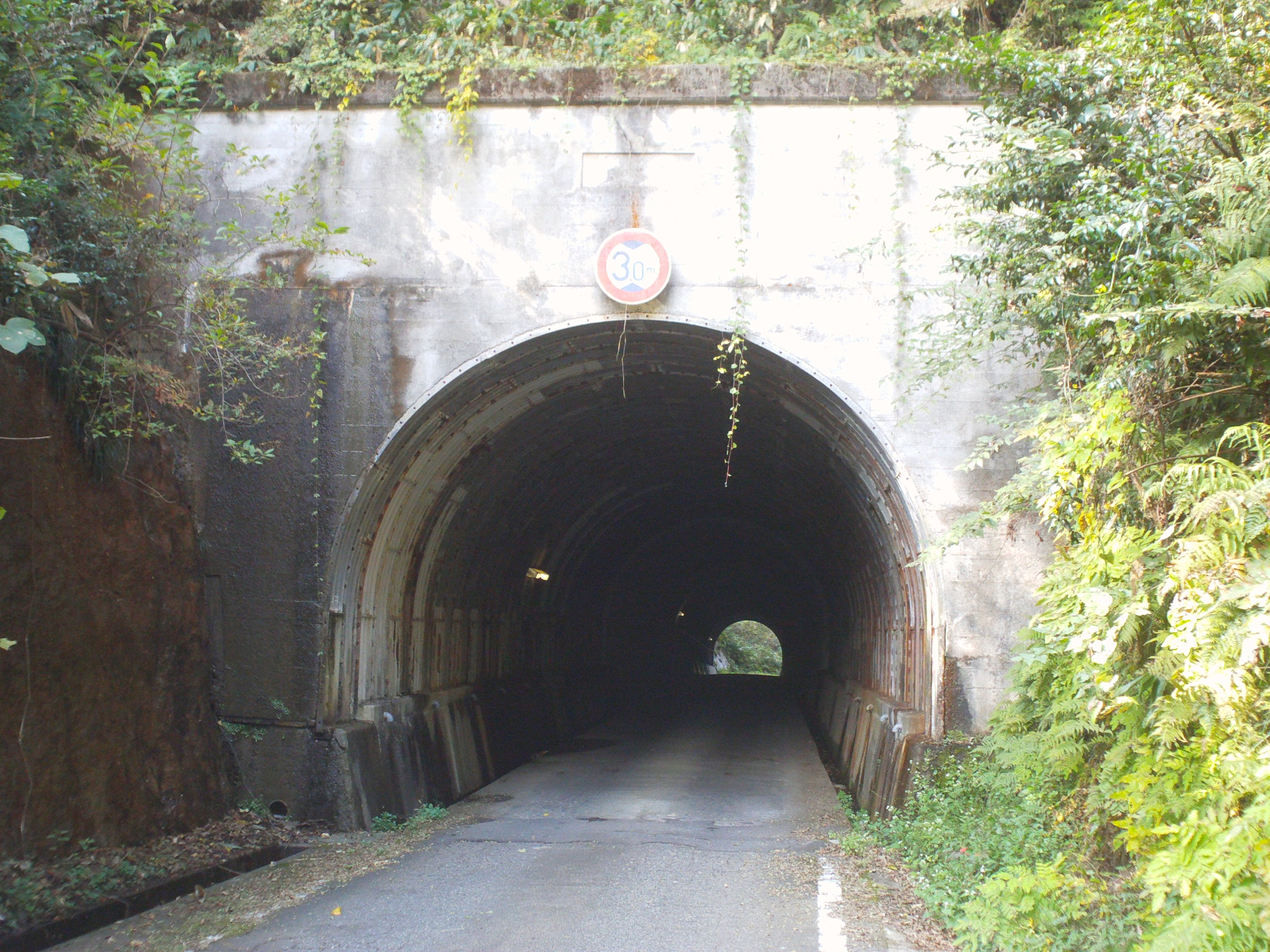

Route information
- Length: 187.7 km (116.6 mi)
- Existed: 1993–present

Location
- Country: Japan

Highway system
- National highways of Japan; Expressways of Japan
← National Route 471	→ National Route 473

National Route 472 (国道472号, Kokudō Yonhyaku Nanajū Ni-gō) is a highway between Imizu, Toyama Prefecture and Gujo, Gifu Prefecture in Japan.

== Route description ==
- Length: 187.7 km (including closed sections)
- Origin: Imizu, Toyama Prefecture at the intersection with Route 415 at Shinkō-no-mori
- Terminus: Gujo, Gifu Prefecture at the intersection with Route 156 at Jōnan-chō
- Main cities en route: Toyama, Takayama
- Designated section: Part of National Route 41 system
