= Nōetsu Expressway =

Expressway in Japan

Nōetsu Expressway
- 能越自動車道

Route information
- Maintained by Ministry of Land, Infrastructure, Transport and Tourism
- Length: 95.8 km (59.5 mi)
- Existed: 1978–present
- Component highways: National Route 470

Major junctions
- South end: Nakanoyu Interchange; Hokuriku Expressway/ Tōkai-Hokuriku Expressway in Oyabe, Toyama
- North end: Noto-Satoyama Airport Interchange; Ishikawa Prefecture Route 303 in Wajima, Ishikawa

Location
- Country: Japan

Highway system
- National highways of Japan; Expressways of Japan
← National Route 469	→ National Route 471

The Nōetsu Expressway (能越自動車道, Nōetsu Jidōshadō) is an incomplete national expressway in Toyama Prefecture and Ishikawa Prefecture. It is owned and operated primarily by the Ministry of Land, Infrastructure, Transport and Tourism (MLIT), but also has sections maintained and tolled by the Toyama and Ishikawa Prefecture Road Corporations. The route is signed E41 under MLIT's "2016 Proposal for Realization of Expressway Numbering" and also as National Route 470.
