= Sakai River (Gifu) =

- Location within Japan
- Native name: 境川 (Japanese)

Location
- Country: Japan

Physical characteristics
- Source
  - location: Kakamigahara
- Mouth: Nagara River
  - location: Hashima, Gifu
  - coordinates: 35°19′53″N 136°41′20″E
- Length: 30.3 km (18.8 mi)
- Basin size: 55 km^{2} (21 sq mi)

Basin features
- River system: Kiso River

The Sakai River (境川, Sakai-gawa) is a river in Japan which flows through Gifu Prefecture. It is part of the Kiso River system.

== Geography ==
The river originates in Kakamigahara, then flows through Gifu, Ginan, Kasamatsu and Hashima, where it flows into the Nagara River.

== History ==
Up until the Sengoku Period, the lower portion of the Sakai River was the main part of the Kiso River. The river received its name, which means "border river," because it formed the border between Mino and Owari provinces.
