= Oyabe =

Oyabe 小矢部市
- City
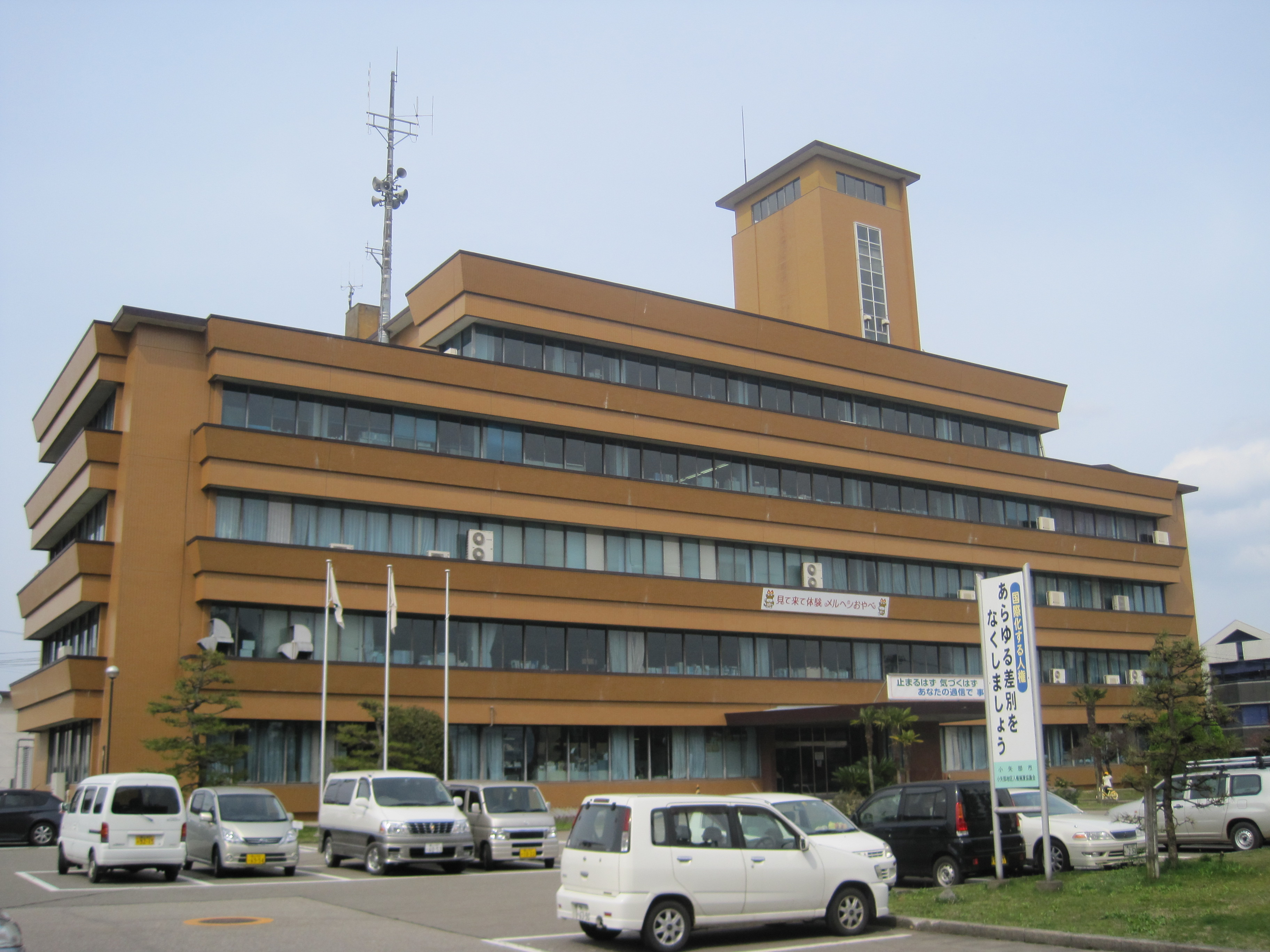
- Oyabe City Hall

- Flag

- Location of Oyabe in Toyama Prefecture

- Location within Japan
- Coordinates: 36°40′31.9″N 136°52′7.3″E
- Country: Japan
- Region: Chūbu
- Prefecture: Toyama

Government
  - Mayor: Morio Sakurai

Area
  - Total: 134.07 km^{2} (51.76 sq mi)

Population (March 31, 2018)
  - Total: 30,328
  - Density: 226.21/km^{2} (585.88/sq mi)
- Time zone: UTC+9 (JST)
- Postal code: 932-8611
  - Tree: Cryptomeria japonica
  - Flower: Iris ensata
  - Flowering tree: Prunus mume
- Phone number: 0766-67-1760
- Address: 1-1 Honmachi, Oyabe-shi, Toyama-ken
- Website: Official website

Oyabe (小矢部市, Oyabe-shi; Japanese pronunciation: [ó̞.jä̀.bè̞, ò̞.jä́.bé̞.ɕì]) is a city in Toyama Prefecture, Japan. As of 31 March 2018, the city had an estimated population of 30,328 in 10,331 households. and a population density of 230 persons per km^{2}. Its total area was 134.07 square kilometres (51.76 sq mi).

== Geography ==
Oyabe is in the Tonami flatlands of far western Toyama Prefecture, and is bordered by Ishikawa Prefecture to the west. Much of the area is a dispersed settlement typical of this region of Japan. Oyabe has a humid subtropical climate (Köppen Cfa) characterized by mild summers and cold winters with heavy snowfall. The average annual temperature in Oyabe is 14.0 °C. The average annual rainfall is 2454 mm with September as the wettest month. The temperatures are highest on average in August, at around 26.7 °C, and lowest in January, at around 2.7 °C.

=== Surrounding municipalities ===
- Ishikawa Prefecture
  - Kanazawa
  - Tsubata
- Toyama Prefecture
  - Nanto
  - Takaoka
  - Tonami

== Demographics ==
Per Japanese census data, the population of Oyabe has declined in recent decades.

Historical population
Year	Pop.	±%
1970	35,367	—
1980	36,497	+3.2%
1990	36,374	−0.3%
2000	34,625	−4.8%
2010	32,067	−7.4%
2020	28,983	−9.6%

== History ==
The area of present-day Oyabe was part of ancient Etchū Province and developed as a post station on the Hokuriku kaidō highway during the Edo period. The town of Isurugi was created with the establishment of the municipalities system on April 1, 1889. It was raised to city status upon merging with the town of Tochu on August 1, 1962, and was renamed Oyabe.

== Government ==
Oyabe has a mayor-council form of government with a directly elected mayor and a unicameral city legislature of 16 members.

== Education ==
Oyabe has five public elementary schools and four public junior high schools operated by the town government, and three public high schools operated by the Toyama Prefectural Board of Education.

== Transportation ==
=== Railway ===
- Ainokaze Toyama Railway
  - Isurugi

=== Highway ===
- Hokuriku Expressway
- National Route 8
- National Route 359
- National Route 471

== Local attractions ==
- Oyabe Yotaka - adapted from a traditional field festival, it is held on the nights of 10 and 11 June. The festival is 400 years old and has been passed down from generation to generation in 84 different locations in Oyabe.
- Helicopter and Disaster Prevention Festival, held from 26–27 August
- Calamus Festival (Flower Festival), held on 18 June
- Mitsui Outlet Park, Hokuriku Oyabe

== Notable people from Oyabe ==
- Hiroshi Hase, Japan's Minister of Education, Culture, Sports, Science and Technology
- Toshio Yamada, politician
