= Japan National Route 22 =

National highway in Japan

National Route 22
- 国道22号
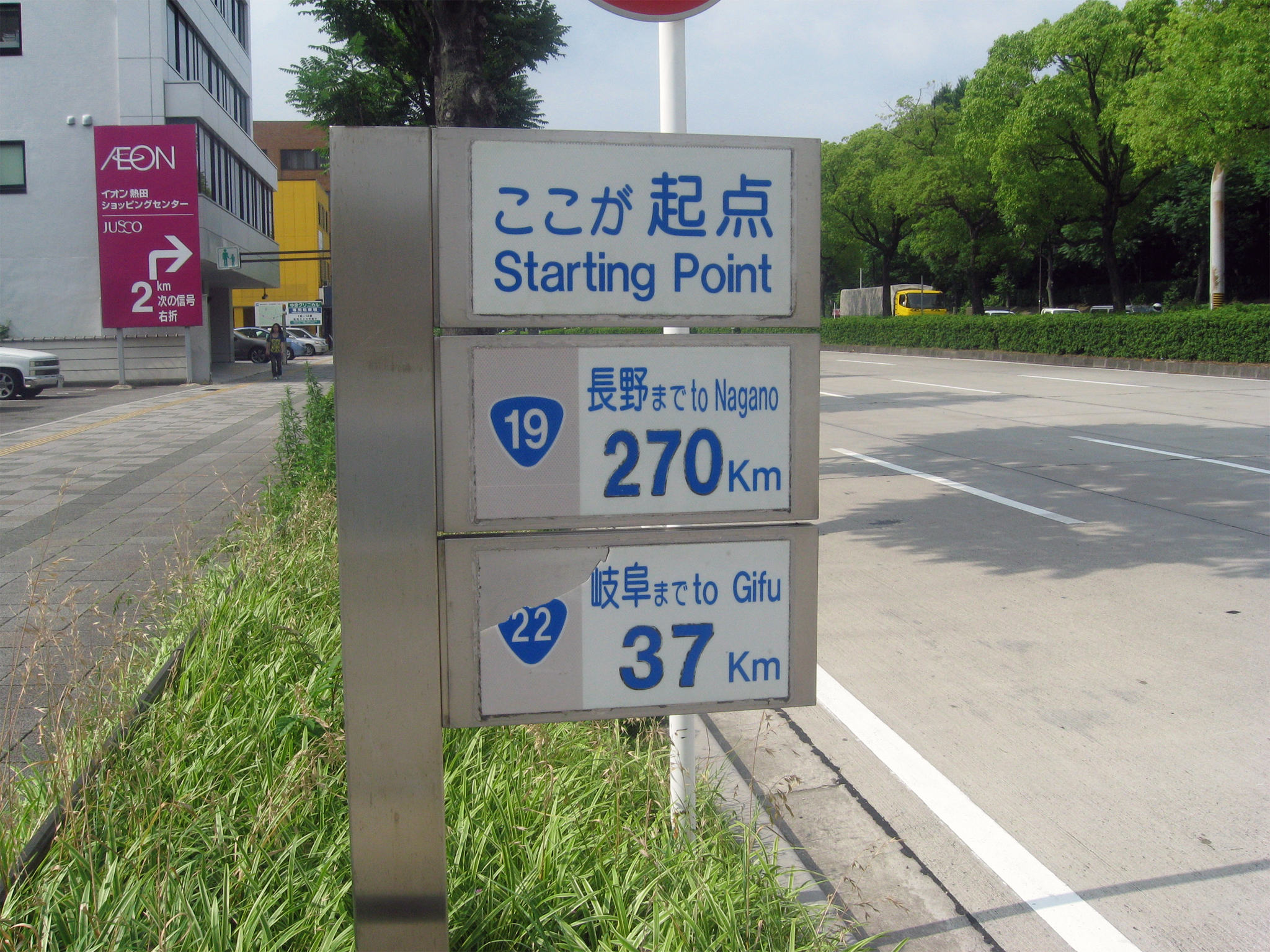

Route information
- Length: 37.0 km (23.0 mi)
- Existed: 4 December 1952–present

Major junctions
- North end: National Route 21 in Gifu
- South end: National Route 1 in Atsuta-ku, Nagoya

Location
- Country: Japan

Highway system
- National highways of Japan; Expressways of Japan
← National Route 21	→ National Route 23

National Route 22 (国道22号, Kokudō Nijūni-gō) is a national highway connecting Nagoya, Aichi Prefecture, and Gifu, Gifu Prefecture in Japan. The route follows the old Minoji, a 17th-century trade route that connected the Nakasendō and the Tōkaidō.

== Route data ==
- Length: 37.0 kilometers (23.0 mi)
- Origin: Nagoya (originates at junction with Route 1)
- Terminus: Gifu (ends at Junction with Route 21)
- Major cities: Ichinomiya

== Overlapping sections ==
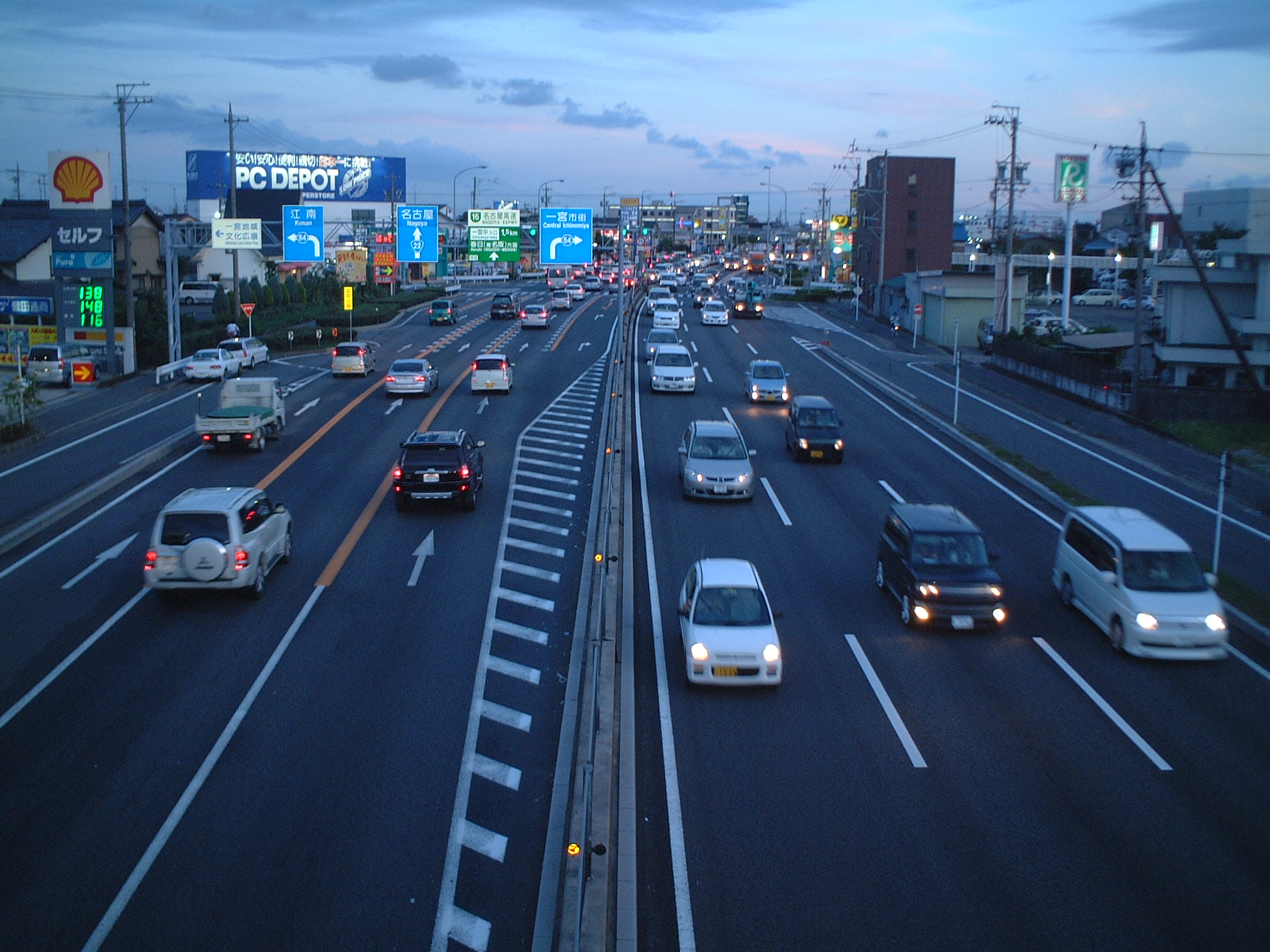
Route 22 in Ichinomiya, Aichi Prefecture

- From Atsuta-ku, Nagoya (Atsuta Shrine South intersection) to Naka-ku, Nagoya (Nichigin-mae intersection): Route 19
- From Ginan (Ginan IC) to Gifu (Akanabe-Hongo intersection): Routes 21 and 156

== History ==
- 4 December 1952 - First Class National Highway 22 (from Nagoya to Gifu)
- 1 April 1965 - General National Highway 22 (from Nagoya to Gifu)

== Intersects with ==
- Aichi Prefecture
  - Routes 1 and 247
  - Route 19
  - Route 302
  - Route 155
- Gifu Prefecture
  - Routes 21 and 156
  - Route 157
