= Japan National Route 471 =

Road in Japan

National Route 471
- 国道471号
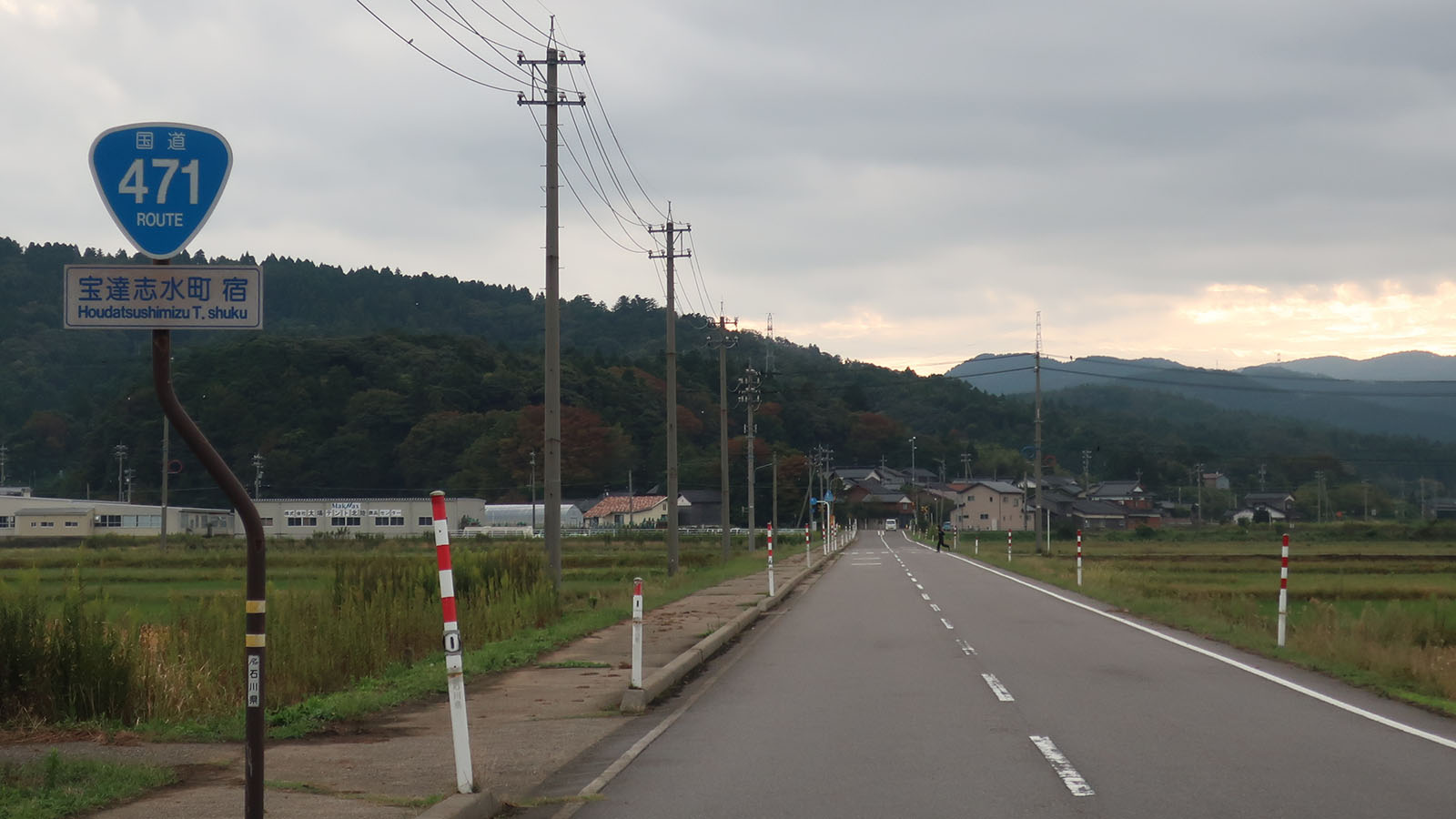

Route information
- Length: 181.6 km (112.8 mi)
- Existed: 1993–present

Location
- Country: Japan

Highway system
- National highways of Japan; Expressways of Japan
← National Route 470	→ National Route 472

National Route 471 is a national highway of Japan connecting between Hakui, Ishikawa and Takayama, Gifu in Japan, with a total length of 181.6 km (112.8 mi).
