= Japan National Route 156 =

National highway in Japan

National Route 156
- 国道156号
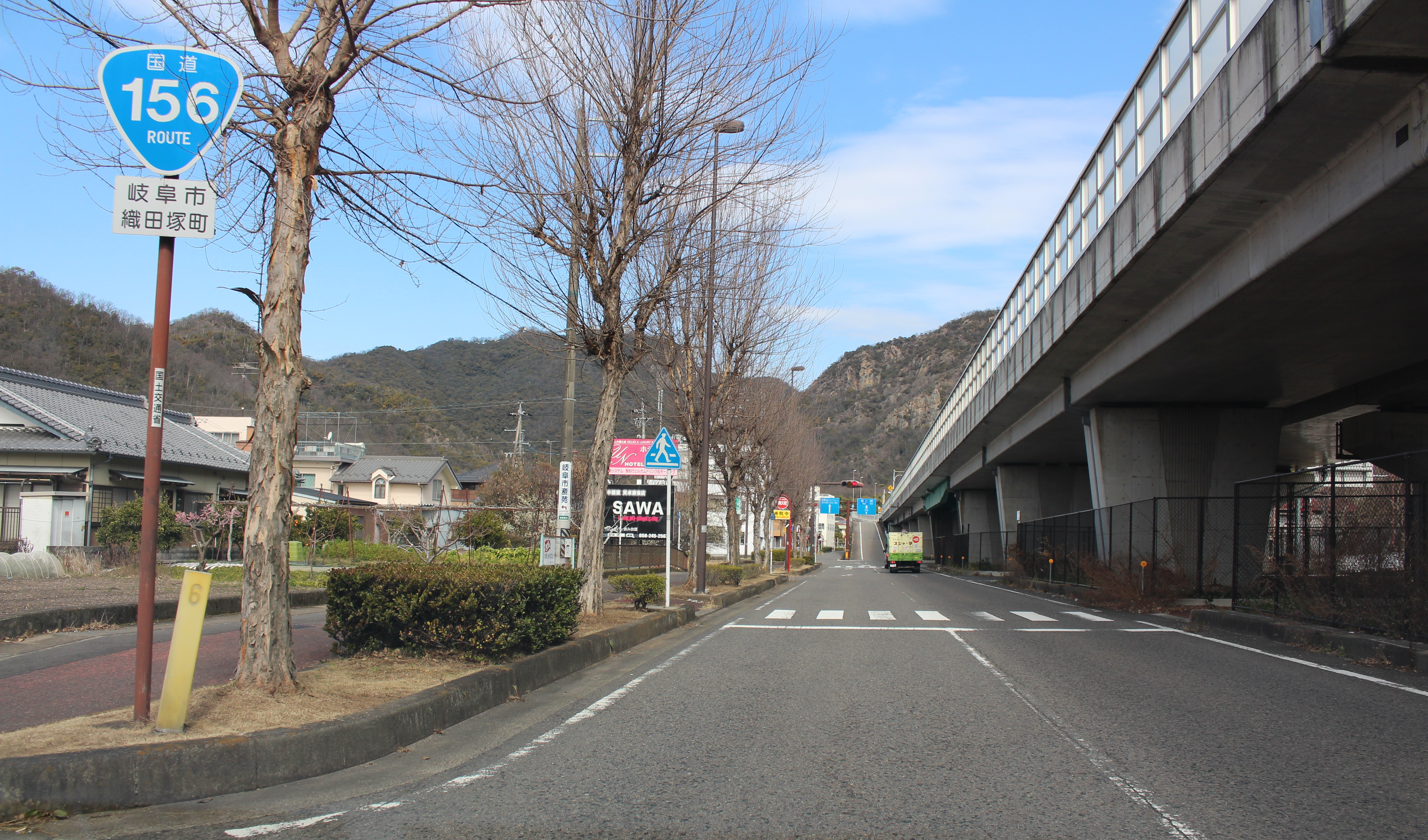

Route information
- Length: 213.3 km (132.5 mi)
- Existed: 1953–present

Major junctions
- North end: National Route 8 in Takaoka, Toyama
- South end: National Route 21 / National Route 22 in Gifu

Location
- Country: Japan

Highway system
- National highways of Japan; Expressways of Japan
← National Route 155	→ National Route 157

National Route 156 is a national highway of Japan connecting Gifu and Takaoka, Toyama, in Japan, with a total length of 213.3 km (132.5 mi).
