= Japan National Route 21 =

National highway in Japan

National Route 21
- 国道21号
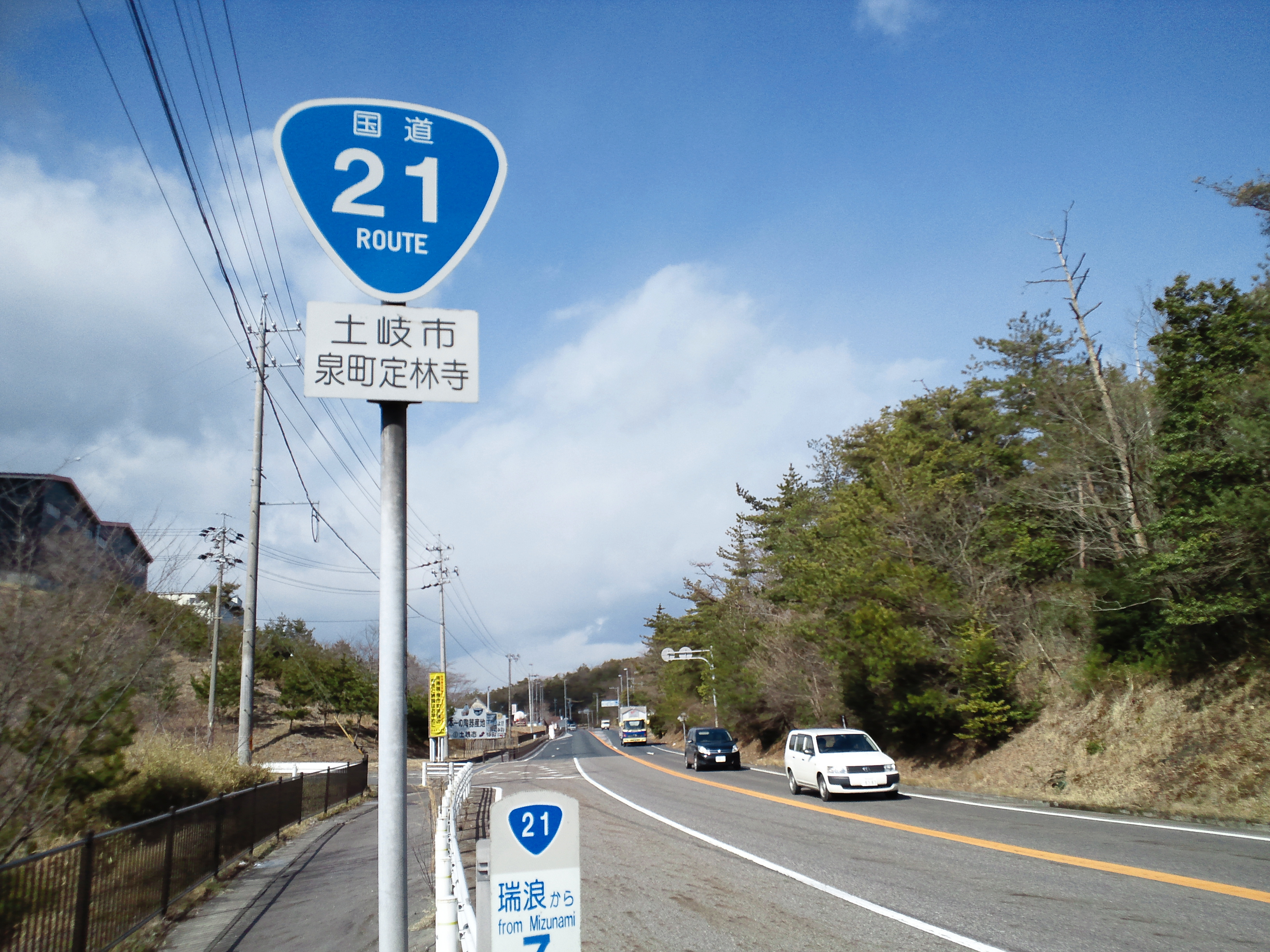

Route information
- Length: 101.4 km (63.0 mi)
- Existed: 4 December 1952–present

Major junctions
- East end: National Route 19 in Mizunami
- West end: National Route 8 in Maibara

Location
- Country: Japan

Highway system
- National highways of Japan; Expressways of Japan
| ← National Route 20 | → National Route 22 |

National Route 21 (国道21号, Kokudō Nijūichi-gō) is a national highway connecting Mizunami, Gifu Prefecture and Maibara, Shiga Prefecture in Japan.

== Route data ==
- Length: 101.4 kilometers (63.0 mi)
- Origin: Mizunami (originates at junction with Route 19)
- Terminus: Maibara (ends at Junction with Route 8)
- Major cities: Minokamo, Kakamigahara, Gifu, Ōgaki

== History ==
- 4 December 1952 - Designation as First Class National Highway 21 (from Mizunami to Maibara)
- 1 April 1965 - Designation as General National Highway 21 (from Mizunami to Maibara)

== Intersects with ==
- Gifu Prefecture
  - Route 19
  - Route 248
  - Route 41
  - Routes 22 and 156
  - Route 157
  - Routes 258 and 417
  - Route 365
- Shiga Prefecture
  - Route 8
