= Women in Japan =

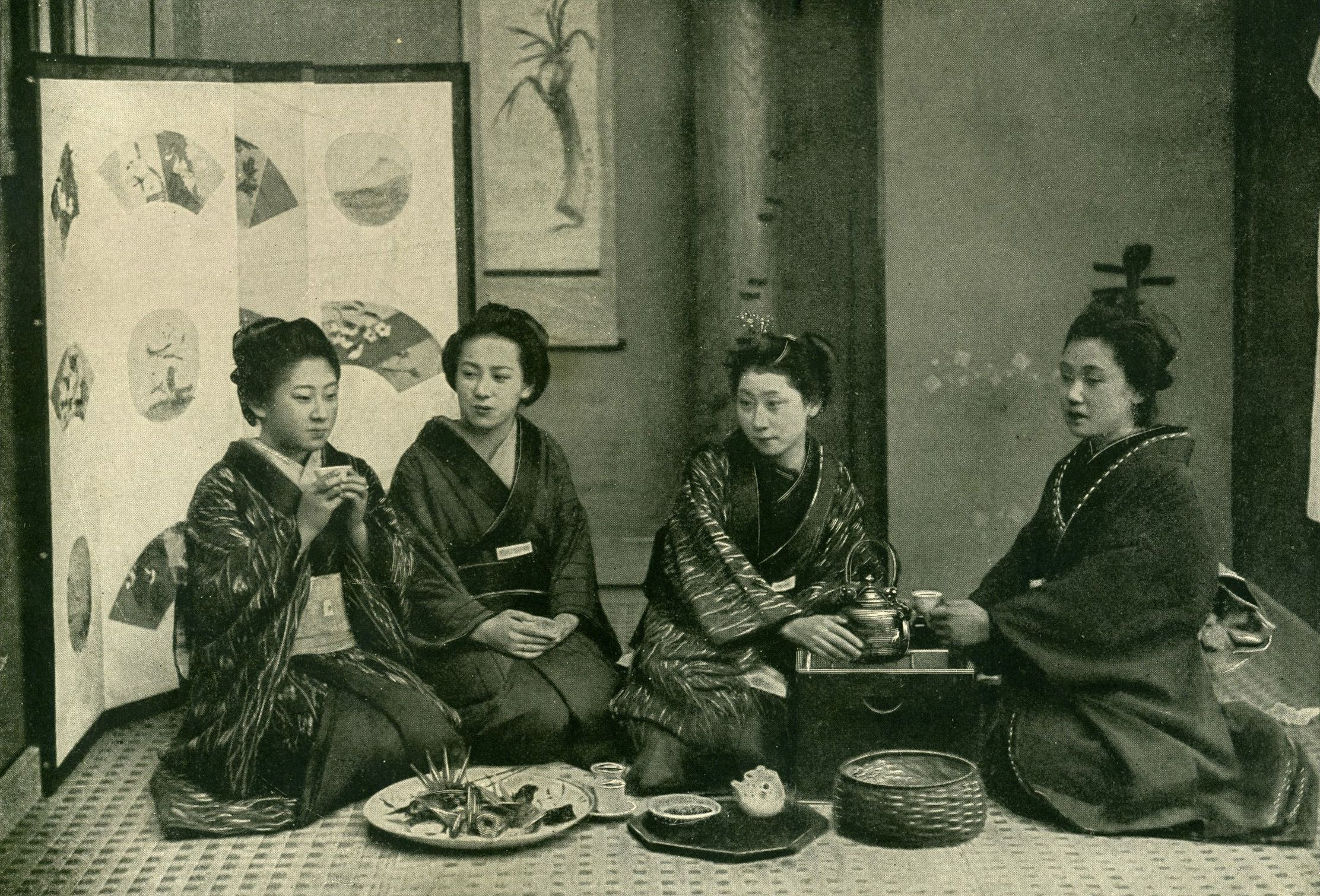
- A photograph of Japanese women from the book "Japan And Japanese" (1902)

General statistics
- Maternal mortality (per 100,000): 2.8 (2020)
- Women in parliament: 19.0% (2024)
- Women over 25 with secondary education: 80.0% (2010)
- Women in labour force: 73.3% employment rate (2023)

Gender Inequality Index
- Value: 0.083 (2021)
- Rank: 22nd out of 191

Global Gender Gap Index
- Value: 0.66 (2024)
- Rank: 118th out of 146

Women in Japan were recognized as having equal legal rights to men after World War II. Japanese women first gained the right to vote in 1880, but this was a temporary event limited to certain municipalities, and it was not until 1945 that women gained the right to vote on a permanent, nationwide basis.

Modern policy initiatives in Japan have aimed to promote both motherhood and women's participation in the workforce, but these efforts have yielded mixed results. Traditional gender expectations, especially for married women and mothers, still shape societal norms and create barriers to economic equality. While the gender income gap has gradually narrowed, it persists, with women earning less than men, particularly in leadership and high-paying roles. Factors such as occupational segregation, the concentration of women in part-time or non-regular jobs, and limited career advancement contribute to this gap.

In 2020, the high school enrollment rate of Japanese women was 95%, the same as that of Japanese men, and the combined enrollment rate for universities, colleges, and junior colleges was 58%, 1% higher than that of men. Despite higher educational attainment, societal expectations around caregiving still impact women's career progression and work-life balance. As a result, while academic progress is evident, significant gender inequality remains in various aspects of Japanese society.

The life expectancy of Japanese women is 87.14 years, the longest among women in any country, 6 years longer than that of Japanese men, 81.09 years.

In 2023, Japan ranked 23rd out of 177 countries on the Women, Peace and Security Index, which is based on 13 indicators of inclusion, justice, and security. In 2024, Japan ranked 22nd out of 193 countries on the Gender Inequality Index, which measures equality between men and women in sexual and reproductive health, empowerment and economic participation. On the other hand, Japan ranked a low 118th out of 146 countries on the Global Gender Gap Index. Japan was judged to have a small gender gap in education and health, but a large gap in political and economic participation, resulting in a lower ranking.

== Transition of social roles ==
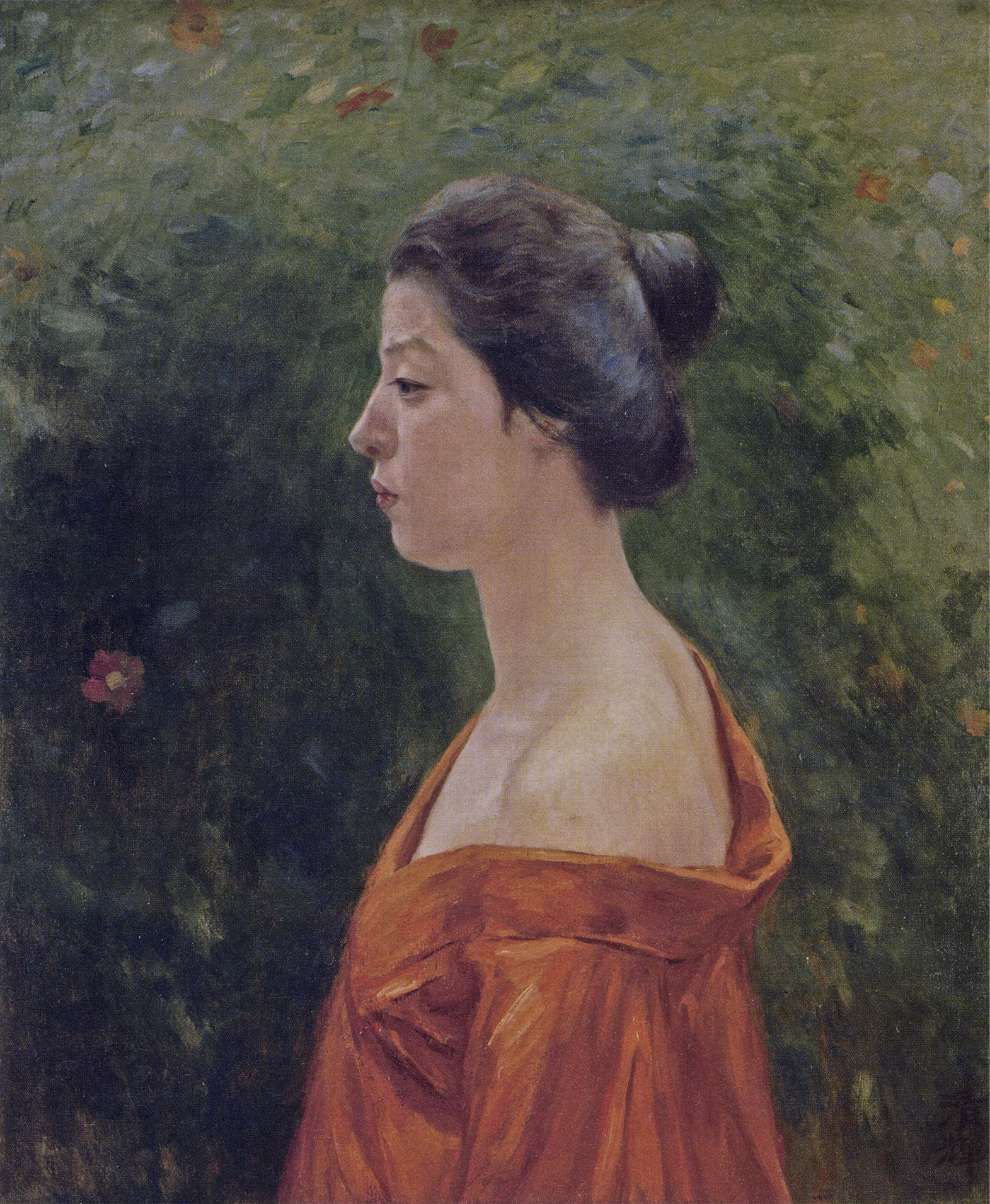
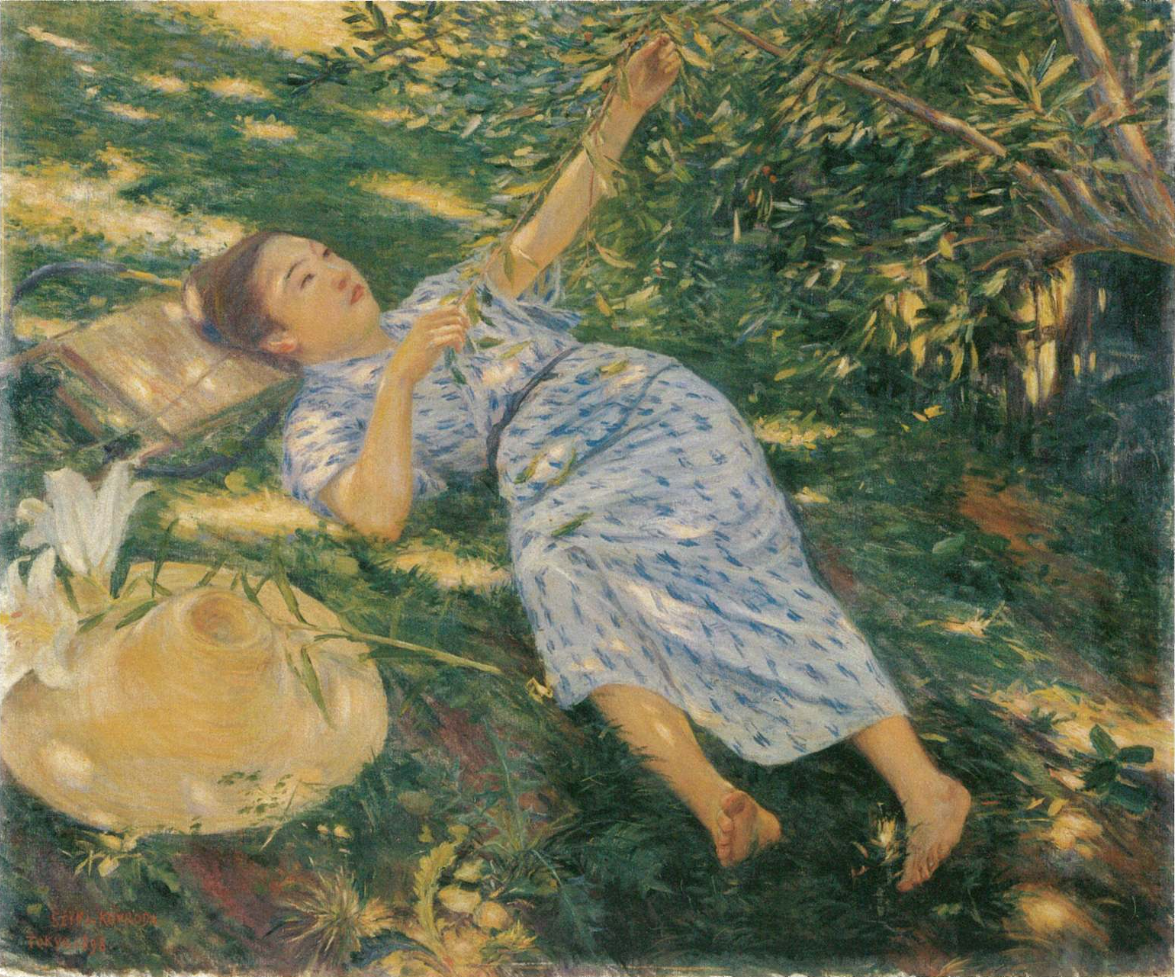
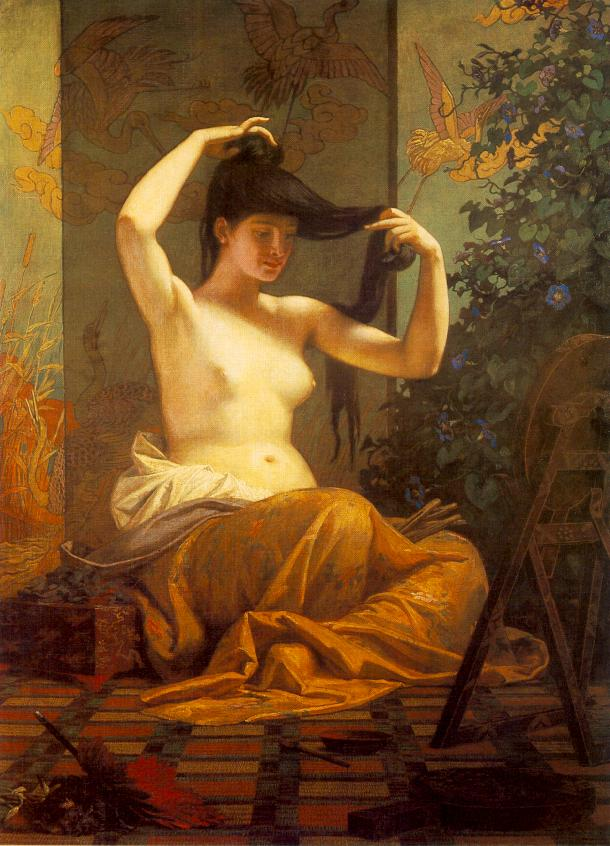
Late 19th/early 20th century depictions of Japanese women, Woman in Red Clothing (1912) and Under the Shade of a Tree (1898) by Kuroda Seiki. Japanese Woman (1903) by Hungarian artist Bertalan Székely.

The extent to which women could participate in Japanese society has varied over time and social classes. In the 8th century, Japan had an empress, and in the 12th century during the Heian period, women in Japan could inherit property in their own names and manage it by themselves: "Women could own property, be educated, and were allowed, if discrete (sic), to take lovers."

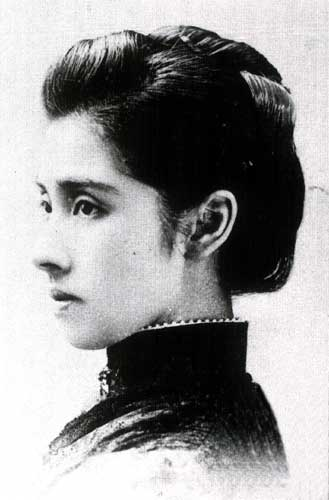
Countess Mutsu Ryōko, wife of notable diplomat Count Mutsu Munemitsu. Photographed in 1888.

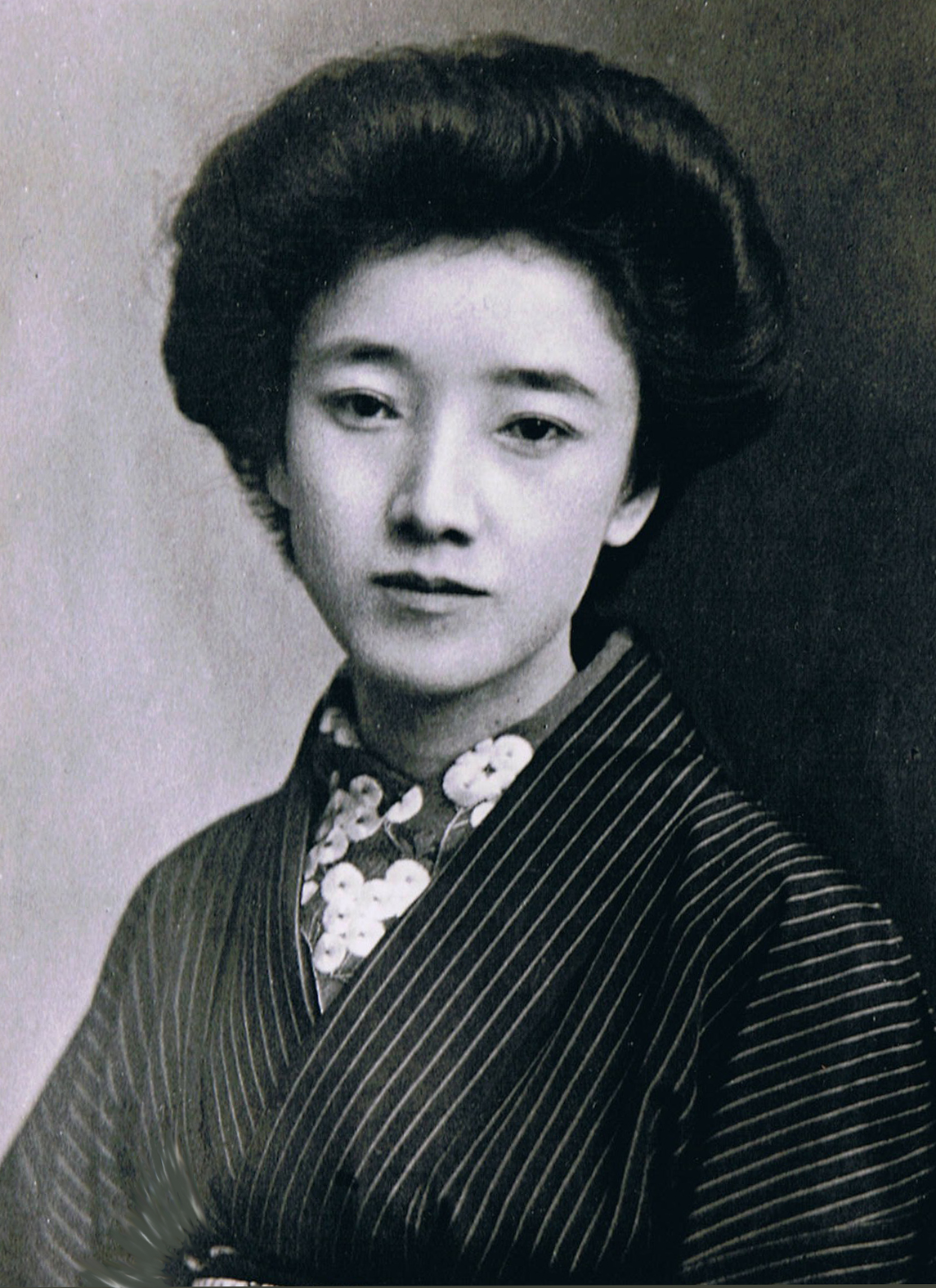
Byakuren Yanagiwara, a poet and member of the imperial family.

From the late Edo period, the status of women declined. In the 17th century, the "Onna Daigaku," or "The Great Learning for Women," by Confucianist author Kaibara Ekken, spelled out expectations for Japanese women, stating that "such is the stupidity of her character that it is incumbent on her, in every particular, to distrust herself and to obey her husband".

During the Meiji period, industrialization and urbanization reduced the authority of fathers and husbands, but at the same time the Meiji Civil Code of 1898 (specifically the introduction of the "ie" system) denied women legal rights and subjugated them to the will of household heads.

=== Behavioral expectations ===
In interviews with Japanese housewives in 1985, anthropologist Takie Lebra found that socialized feminine behavior in Japan followed several patterns of modesty, tidiness, courtesy, compliance, and self-reliance. Modesty extended to the effective use of silence in both daily conversations and activities. Tidiness included personal appearance and a clean home. Courtesy, another trait, was called upon from women in domestic roles and in entertaining guests, extended to activities such as preparing and serving tea.

Lebra's traits included compliance; for example, children were expected not to refuse their parents. Self-reliance of women was encouraged because needy women were seen as a burden on others. In her interviews, Lebra found that girls were assigned helping tasks while boys were more inclined to be left to schoolwork. Lebra's work has been critiqued for focusing specifically on a single economic segment of Japanese women.

Although Japan remains a socially conservative society, with relatively pronounced gender roles, Japanese women and Japanese society are quite different from the strong stereotypes that exist in foreign media or travel guides, which still often paint women in Japan as 'submissive' and devoid of self-determination. Another stereotype about Japan is that women always stay in the home as housewives and do not participate in public life: in reality most women are employed – the employment rate of women (ages 15–64) is 73.3%.

== Political status of women ==
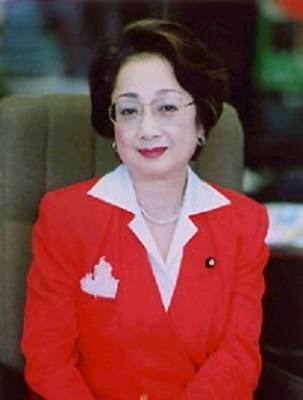
Chikage Oogi was the first female President of the House of Councillors and the first woman to be awarded the Grand Cordon of the Order of the Paulownia Flowers and the Grand Cordon of the Order of the Rising Sun.

In 1880, women were given the right to vote for the first time in Japan, albeit on a limited basis. On April 8, 1880, an act was passed establishing councils of publicly elected representatives in wards (区), towns (町), and villages (村), and allowing each municipality to establish its own election rules. As a result, Kamimachi and Kosakadaka Village in Kochi Prefecture gave female householders the right to vote in addition to male, marking the first time that women exercised the right to vote in Japan. However, on May 7, 1884, this law was amended and the right to vote was restricted to men over the age of 20 nationwide. Women were given the right to vote nationwide in December 1945, after World War II, when the election law for the House of Representatives was amended.

As the new de facto ruler of Japan, Douglas MacArthur ordered the drafting of a new constitution for Japan in February 1946. Four women were in the working group, including Beate Sirota Gordon who was enlisted to the subcommittee assigned to writing the section of the constitution devoted to civil rights and women's rights in Japan. This new constitutional section conferred greater freedom and equality to men to women in Japan.

In 1960, Masa Nakayama was appointed Minister of Health and Welfare, becoming the first female Minister of State.

From 1990 to 2000, Sadako Ogata served as United Nations High Commissioner for Refugees, becoming the first woman, the first Japanese national, and the first academic to hold the post. She later served as the inaugural President of the Japan International Cooperation Agency from 2003 to 2012.

In 1993, Takako Doi became the first woman to serve as Speaker of the House of Representatives.

In 1997, Nobuko Matsubara (ja) became the first woman to be appointed Administrative Vice Minister, the highest ranking career civil service position within a Japanese government ministry. In 2024, Naomi Unemoto (ja) became the first woman to serve as Prosecutor General, the highest ranking career civil service official within the Ministry of Justice and the head of Japan’s prosecutorial authority.

In 2000, Fusae Ota became the first woman to serve as a prefectural governor in Japan. In 2016, Yuriko Koike was elected Governor of Tokyo, becoming the first woman to hold the office in the country's de facto capital.

As a member of the House of Councillors, Chikage Oogi held several important government positions, including Minister of Land, Infrastructure, Transport and Tourism. She was the first woman to be awarded the Grand Cordon of the Order of the Rising Sun in 2003, the first woman to be appointed President of the House of Councillors in 2004, and the first woman to be awarded the Grand Cordon of the Order of the Paulownia Flowers in 2010.

Sanae Takaichi became Japan’s first female prime minister in 2025. In 2026, Shōko Kawata became the first Japanese mayor to take maternity leave.

=== Female representation in politics ===
==== Percentage of women in the National Diet ====
The percentage of women in the House of Representatives was 8.4% in the 1946 general election, when women were first given the right to vote nationwide.

In 1994, Japan implemented electoral reform and introduced a mixed electoral system that included both single-member districts (SMD) using plurality and a party list system with proportional representation. In general, the proportion of female legislators in the House of Representatives has grown since the reform. However, when it comes to women's representation in politics, Japan remains behind other developed democracies as well as many developing countries.

In the 2021 Japanese general election, less than 18 percent of candidates (186 out of 1051) of the House of Representatives were women. Of these 186 candidates, 45 were elected, constituting 9.7 percent of the 465 seats in the lower chamber.

In the 2022 Japanese House of Councillors election a record 35 women were elected to Japan's House of Councillors, the country's upper house. The number of women candidates in the election also reached a record high of 181.

In the 2024 Japanese general election, women won 73 seats, or 15.7 percent of the 465 seats. At that time, women held 61 seats in the House of Councillors, 25.4 percent of the 240 seats, and women held 19.0 percent of the seats in the upper and lower houses of parliament. As a result of this election, the percentage of seats held by women reached an all-time high. The Japanese government has set a goal of increasing the proportion of women in leadership positions to 30 percent, but this is expected to be difficult to achieve.

Japanese women fare better when it comes to local politics. As of 2015, women made up 27.8% of the local assemblies in the Tokyo's Special Wards, 17.4% in designated cities, 16.1% in general cities, 10.4% in towns and villages, and 9.1% in prefectures. In 2019, the proportion of female candidates in local assembly elections hit a record high of 17.3% in city assembly elections and 12.1% in town and village assembly elections. At the end of December 2023, the highest percentage of female councillors was 36.2% in Tokyo's special wards, followed by 22.9% in designated cities. The percentage of female councillors was 19.1% in general city councils, 14.6% in prefectural councils and 13.6% in town/village councils, with urban areas having a higher percentage of female councillors.

==== The LDP and female representation ====
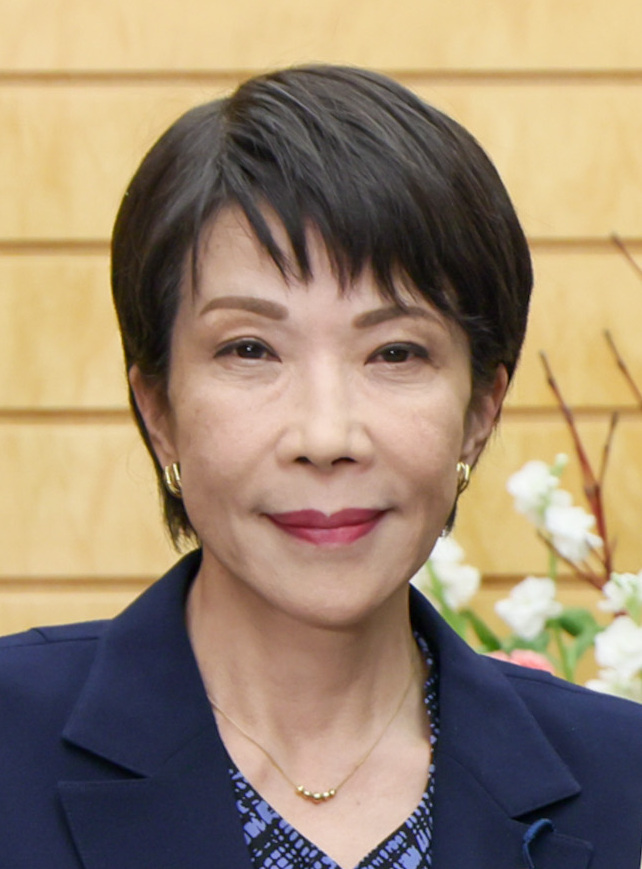
Sanae Takaichi.

The Liberal Democratic Party (LDP) has made promises to increase the presence of women in Japanese politics, but has not achieved their stated goals. For example, in 2003, the LDP expressed commitment to achieving 30% female representation in political and administrative positions by 2020 per international norms. However, they remain far from this number. Scholars have noted that the internal structure and rules of the LDP do not favor female candidates. The LDP often seeks out candidates with experience in bureaucracy or local politics, which disadvantages women since they are less likely to have been in these positions. The LDP also has a bottom-up nomination process, whereby the initial nominations are made by local party offices. As these local offices are dominated by men, or the old boys' network, it is difficult for Japanese women to be nominated by the LDP. A break from this bottom-up process took place in 2005, when Prime Minister and President of the LDP Junichiro Koizumi himself placed women at the top of the PR lists. As a result, all of the 26 LDP's women candidates won either by plurality in their SMD or from the PR list. However, Koizumi's top-down nomination was not a reflection of the LDP's prioritization of gender equality, but rather a political strategy to draw in votes by signaling change. After this election, the LDP returned to its bottom-up nomination process. The party elected their first female leader in 2025, Sanae Takaichi.

==== Opposition parties and female representation ====
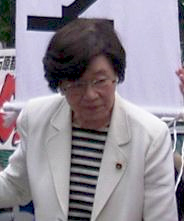
Takako Doi

In 1989, the Japan Socialist Party (JSP), the largest left-wing opposition party to the LDP at the time, succeeded in electing 22 women to the Diet. The record number of women elected to the Diet was dubbed the "Madonna Boom." Under the leadership of Takako Doi, the JSP ran women outside of conventional political circles and emphasized their clean, "outsider" status to juxtapose themselves against the LDP, who were facing accusations of bribery, a sex scandal, and public dismay at its consumption tax policies. However, the JSP quickly lost momentum afterwards. In the 1992 House of Councillors election, only 4 women members of the JSP were reelected. The JSP also failed to take advantage of the Madonna Boom to institutionalize gender quotas due to other priorities on its agenda.

Another spike in the number of women in the Japanese Diet came in 2009, when the Democratic Party of Japan (DPJ) took over the House of Representatives from the LDP in a landslide victory. Out of the 46 female candidates ran by the DPJ, 40 were elected. However, the DPJ also failed to capitalize on this momentum to institutionalize gender quotas. While the DPJ implemented a few non-quota policies with the aim of increasing women's representation, the effects of these policies were only marginal. Similar to the LDP in 2005, the DPJ ran a large number of women candidates not because the party cared about gender equality, but due to political strategy. In fact, the DPJ imitated Prime Minister Koizumi's strategy of indicating reform and societal change through its nomination of women.

==== Explanations of low female representation ====
Survey experiments show that Japanese voters do not "harbor particularly negative attitudes" against female candidates; rather, the low levels of female representation in Japanese politics is due more to Japanese women's reluctance to seek office. Japanese women are less likely to run for office because of socially mandated gender roles, which dictate that women should take care of children and the household. Research suggests that Japanese women are more willing to run for office if parties provide support with household duties during the campaign. Women candidates of reproductive age are also less likely than men to run in single-member districts (SMD) in Japan, as opposed to party-list seats, which can be explained by the higher time commitment associated with running in SMD. Furthermore, when Japanese women marry, they often have to move in with their husbands in a different locality. As a result, Japanese women are less able to run for local assemblies because they lack connections with their locality.

The gender roles that discourage Japanese women from seeking elected office have been further consolidated through Japan's model of the welfare state. In particular, since the postwar period, Japan has adopted the "male breadwinner" model, which favors a nuclear-family household in which the husband is the breadwinner for the family while the wife is a dependant. When the wife is not employed, the family is eligible for social insurance services and tax deductions. With this system, the Japanese state can depend on the housewives for care-related work, which reduces state social expenditures. Yet, the "male breadwinner" model has also entrenched gender roles by providing an optimal life course for families that discourage women participating in public life.

=== Sexism and harassment in politics ===
Given the dominance of men in Japanese politics, female politicians often face gender-based discrimination and harassment in Japan. They experience harassment from the public, both through social media and in-person interactions, and from their male colleagues. A 2021 survey revealed that 56.7% of 1,247 female local assembly members had been sexually harassed by voters or other politicians. Even though the 1997 revision of the EEOL criminalized sexual harassment in the workplace, female politicians in Japan often do not have the same support when they are harassed by male colleagues. The LDP has been reluctant to implement measures to counter harassment within the party and to promote gender equality more generally. However, vocal female politicians of the party like Seiko Noda have publicly condemned male politicians' sexist statements.

== Professional life ==
In 1947, the Labor Standards Act was enacted, providing for equal pay for equal work, which means that an employee cannot be paid differently than a male employee because she is a woman. In 1986, the Equal Employment Opportunity Law took effect, prohibiting discrimination in aspects like dismissal and retirement. The law was revised in 1997 to be more comprehensive, prohibiting discrimination in recruitment and promotion as well. Another round of revision in 2006 also prohibits job requirements that disproportionately advantage one gender over another, or indirect discrimination. However, women remain economically disadvantaged as a wage gap remains between full-time male and female workers. There also exists a wage gap between full-time and irregular workers despite the rising percentage of irregular workers among women.

During the 21st century, Japanese women are working in higher proportions than the United States's working female population. The earnings gap between men and women in Japan has narrowed over the years: in 1989, women workers earned only 60.2% of men's earnings, but by 2021 the gap had narrowed to 75.2%. For full-time workers only, women earned 77.6% of men's earnings, about 10% below the OECD average, about the same as in Israel, and about 9% higher than in South Korea. At the 2020, the largest source of the gender earnings gap is the difference in job titles, followed by the difference in tenure, and these differences arise because nearly 50% of women leave the workforce to have children and care for them. According to a survey conducted by the Ministry of Health, Labor and Welfare in 2023, 10.2% of the 7,780 companies surveyed said they had received complaints from female employees about harassment for taking leave for pregnancy, childbirth or childcare in the past three years.

Japan has a strong tradition of women being housewives after marriage. These include a family wage offered by corporations which subsidized health and housing subsidies, marriage bonuses and additional bonuses for each child; and pensions for wives who earn below certain incomes. When mothers do work, they often pick up part-time, low-paying jobs based on their children's or husband's schedule. Taking care of the family and household is seen as a predominately female role, and working women are expected to fulfill it. The obento box tradition, where mothers prepare elaborate lunches for their children to take to school, is an example of a domestic female role. Nevertheless, in recent years the number of women who work has increased: in 2022, women made up 44.9% of the labour force of Japan. Japan has an especially high proportion of women who work part-time, and a majority of those women are mothers.

A number of government and private post-war policies have contributed to a gendered division of labor. Additionally, in 1961, income for wives of working men were untaxed below $10,000; income above that amount contributed to overall household income. Corporate culture also plays a role; while many men are expected to socialize with their managers after long work days, women may find trouble balancing child-rearing roles with the demands of mandatory after-work social events.

Some economists suggest that a better support system for working mothers, such as a shorter daily work schedule, would allow more women to work, increasing Japan's economic growth. To that end, in 2003, the Japanese government set a goal to have 30% of senior government roles filled by women. In 2015, only 3.5% were; the government has since slashed the 2020 goal to 7%, and set a private industry goal to 15%.

=== Military service ===
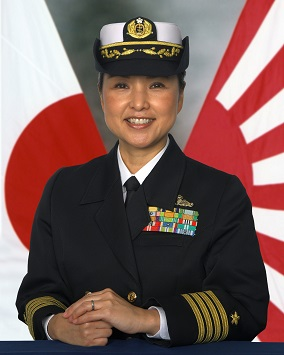
Miho Otani

As of the end of March 2025, women accounted for 9.1 percent of all uniformed personnel in the Japan Self-Defense Forces and 28.1 percent of civilian officials in the Ministry of Defense. In response to labor shortages caused by Japan's declining birthrate and aging population, the Ministry of Defense and the Self-Defense Forces have accelerated the recruitment of women. Since fiscal year 2021, women have comprised at least 17 percent of new uniformed recruits and at least 38 percent of newly hired civilian officials.

The Self-Defense Forces have gradually lifted restrictions on the assignment of women. As of 2025, all occupational fields, including fighter pilots, paratroopers, and submarine crews, have been opened to women. In 2016, Miho Otani became the first woman to command a commissioned surface combatant, and in 2019, she assumed command of the Aegis-equipped destroyer Myōkō, one of the Japan Maritime Self-Defense Force's principal surface combatants. In 2018, Misa Matsushima became the first woman fighter pilot in the Self-Defense Forces.

Even before combat roles were opened to women, they had long served in a wide range of support units. In 2001, Hikaru Saeki, a medical officer, became the first woman promoted to the rank of rear admiral. In Japan, the lowest flag rank carries two stars, represented by cherry blossom insignia, and Saeki thus became the first woman to attain a star bearing rank. In 2023, Natsue Kondo, whose career background was in finance and logistics, became the first woman promoted to the rank of vice admiral, attaining the three star level.

== Family life ==
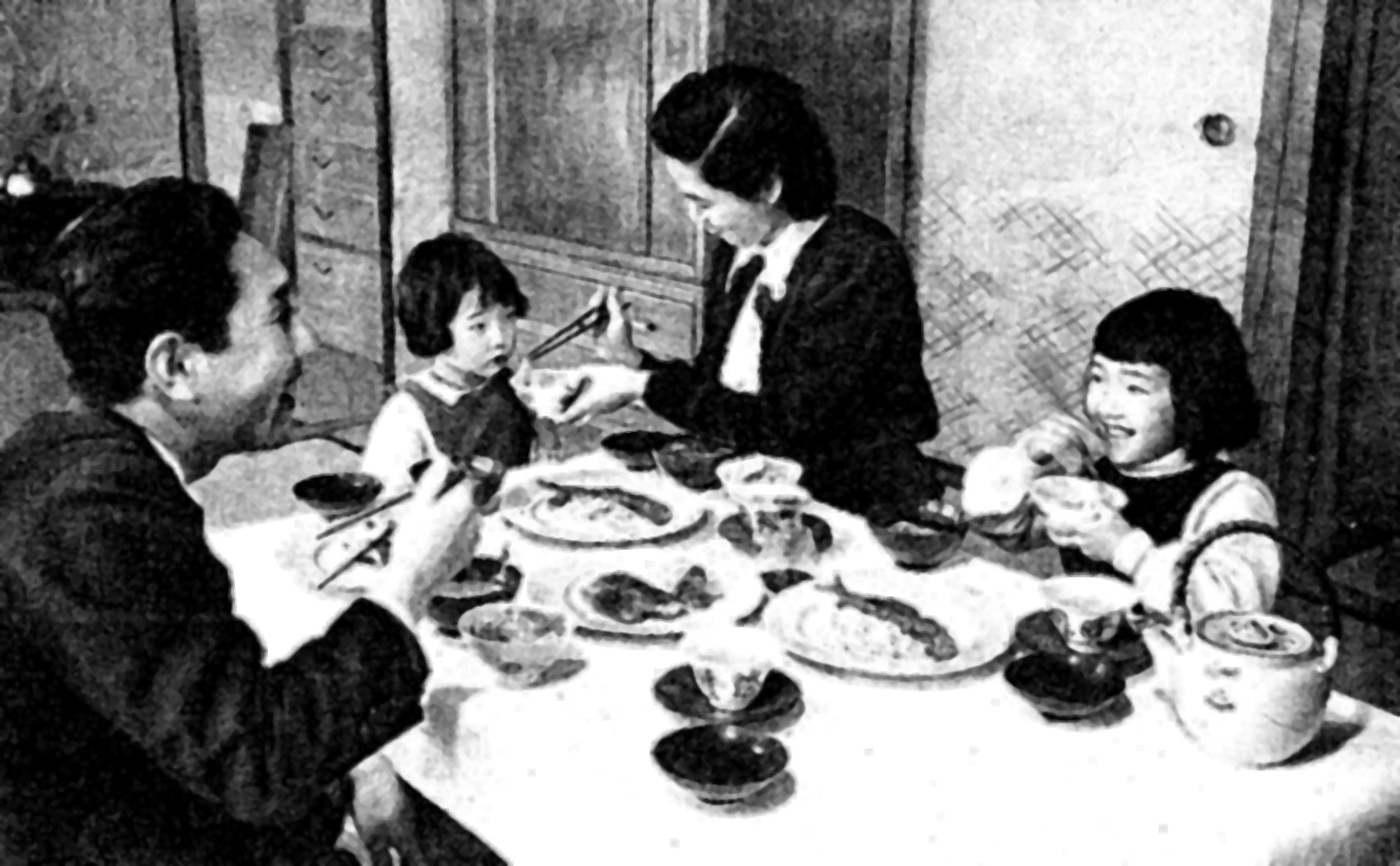
A Japanese family as presented in a magazine in the 1950s

In Japan, managing household finances is an important role for women as wives and mothers. Japanese women differ significantly from Western society in that they are responsible for most of the household chores as well as managing the household finances. Generally, the wife receives all of her husband's income and gives him some money as a monthly allowance. When a woman is the mother, she is more likely to manage the household finances, and when she and her husband work together, she is less likely to manage the household finances. According to a 2012 BBC report, women manage 74% of household finances in Japan. According to a survey by Meiji Yasuda Life Insurance released in 2018, Japanese families are generally led by the wife. In 51.6% of couples, the wife is the leader of the household, and in 12.8% of couples, the husband is the leader. In only 4% of families was the husband the leader in childcare and education.

As of 2025, Japanese women spent an average of 7 hours and 48 minutes per day on housework, childcare, and caregiving, the shortest duration recorded since the survey began, while men spent 3 hours and 29 minutes. Although a substantial gap remained, the narrowing of the disparity was accompanied by an increase of 12.1 percentage points in women’s satisfaction with the division of housework and childcare compared with the previous survey conducted two years earlier, bringing the figure to 60.1 percent. Women also tended to report higher levels of satisfaction when their husbands took parental leave.

The traditional role of women in Japan has been defined as "three submissions": young women submit to their fathers, married women submit to their husbands, and elderly women submit to their sons. Strains of this arrangement can be seen in contemporary Japan, where housewives are responsible for cooking, cleaning, and child-rearing and support their husbands so they can work without any worries about the family, as well as balancing the household's finances. Yet, as the number of dual-income households rises, women and men are sharing household chores, and research shows that this has led to increased satisfaction over households that divide labor in traditional ways.

Families, prior to and during the Meiji restoration, relied on a patriarchal lineage of succession, with disobedience to the male head of the household punishable by expulsion from the family unit. Male heads of households with only daughters would adopt male heirs to succeed them, sometimes through arranged marriage to a daughter. Heads of households were responsible for house finances, but could delegate to another family member or retainer (employee). Women in these households were typically subject to arranged marriages at the behest of the household's patriarch, with more than half of all marriages in Japan being preemptively arranged until the 1960s. Married women marked themselves by blackening their teeth and shaving their eyebrows.

After the Meiji period, the head of the household was required to approve of any marriage. Until 1908, it remained legal for husbands to murder wives for infidelity.

As late as the 1930s, arranged marriages continued, and so-called "love matches" were thought to be rare and somewhat scandalous, especially for the husband, who would be thought "effeminate".

The Post-War Constitution, however, codified women's right to choose their partners. Article 24 of Japan's Constitution states:

Marriage shall be based only on the mutual consent of both sexes and it shall be maintained through mutual cooperation with the equal rights of husband and wife as a basis. With regard to choice of spouse, property rights, inheritance, choice of domicile, divorce and other matters pertaining to marriage and the family, laws shall be enacted from the standpoint of individual dignity and the essential equality of the sexes.

This established several changes to women's roles in the family, such as the right to inherit the family home or land, and the right of women (over the age of 20) to marry without the consent of the house patriarch.

In the early Meiji period, many girls married at age 16; by the post-war period, it had risen to 23, and continued to rise. The average age for a Japanese woman's first marriage has steadily risen since 1970, from 24 to 29.3 years old in 2015.

=== Right to divorce ===
In the Tokugawa period, men could divorce their wives simply through stating their intention to do so in a letter. Wives could not legally arrange for a divorce, but options included joining convents, such as at Kamakura, where men were not permitted to go, thus assuring a permanent separation.

Under the Meiji system, however, the law limited grounds for divorce to seven events: sterility, adultery, disobedience to the parents-in-law, loquacity, larceny, jealousy, and disease. However, the law offered a protection for divorcees by guaranteeing a wife could not be sent away if she had nowhere else to go. Furthermore, the law allowed a woman to request a divorce, so long as she was accompanied by a male relative and could prove desertion or imprisonment of the husband, profligacy, or mental or physical illness.

By 1898, cruelty was added to the grounds for a woman to divorce; the law also allowed divorce through mutual agreement of the husband and wife. However, children were assumed to remain with the male head of the household. In contemporary Japan, children are more likely to live with single mothers than single fathers; in 2013, 7.4% of children were living in single-mother households; only 1.3% live with their fathers.

When divorce was granted under equal measures to both sexes under the post-war constitution, divorce rates steadily increased.

In 2015, Article 733 of Japan's Civil Code stating that women could not remarry until six months after divorce was amended to specify 100 days. The six-month ban on remarriage for women previously aimed to "avoid uncertainty regarding the identity of the legally presumed father of any child born in that time period". Under article 772, a child born 300 days after divorce is presumed to be the legal child of the previous husband. In a ruling issued on December 16, 2015, the Supreme Court of Japan stated that, in light of the new law requiring 100 days before women's remarriage, any child born after 200 days of remarriage is to be considered the legal child of the current husband, so there is no confusion over the paternity of a child born to a woman who has remarried.

The Ministry of Japan revealed the outline of an amendment for the Civil Code of Japan on February 18, 2016. This amendment shortens the women's remarriage period to 100 days and allows any woman who is not pregnant during the divorce to remarry immediately after divorce.

=== Surname change ===
A law in Japan, dating from 1896, requires a married couple to have a common surname. Although the law is gender-neutral, meaning that either spouse is allowed to change his/her name to that of the other spouse, Japanese women have traditionally adopted their husband's family name and 96% of women continue to do so as of 2015. In 2015, the Japanese Supreme Court upheld the constitutionality of the law, noting that women could use their maiden names informally, and stating that it was for the legislature to decide on whether to pass new legislation on separate spousal names. The law was challenged again in 2018, and the Supreme Court upheld it again in 2021.

=== Motherhood ===
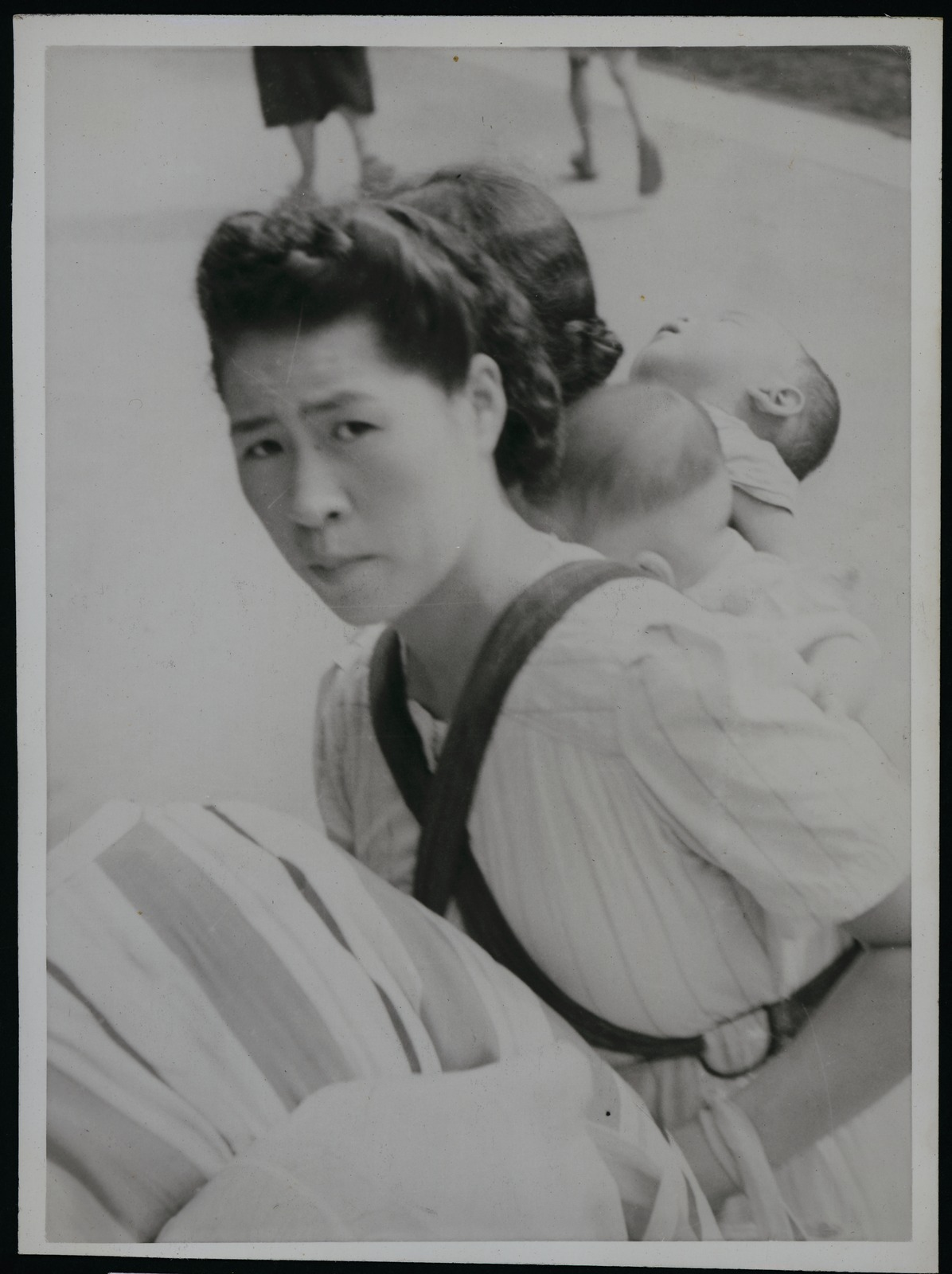
A Japanese mother with children on her back, c. 1947

While women before the Meiji period were often considered incompetent in the raising of children, the Meiji period saw motherhood as the central task of women, and allowed education of women toward this end. In Japanese society, mothers usually place a strong emphasis on their children's education and moral growth, with a special focus on nurturing values like politeness, respect and responsibility. Traditionally and historically women were typically responsible for both parenting and managing household matters within the family structure.

There is continuing debate about the role women's education plays in Japan's declining birthrate. Japan's total fertility rate is 1.4 children born per woman (2015 estimate), which is below the replacement rate of 2.1. Japanese women have their first child at an average age of 30.3 (2012 estimate).

Government policies to increase the birthrate include early education designed to develop citizens into capable parents. Some critics of these policies believe that this emphasis on birth rate is incompatible with a full recognition of women's equality in Japan.

== Education ==
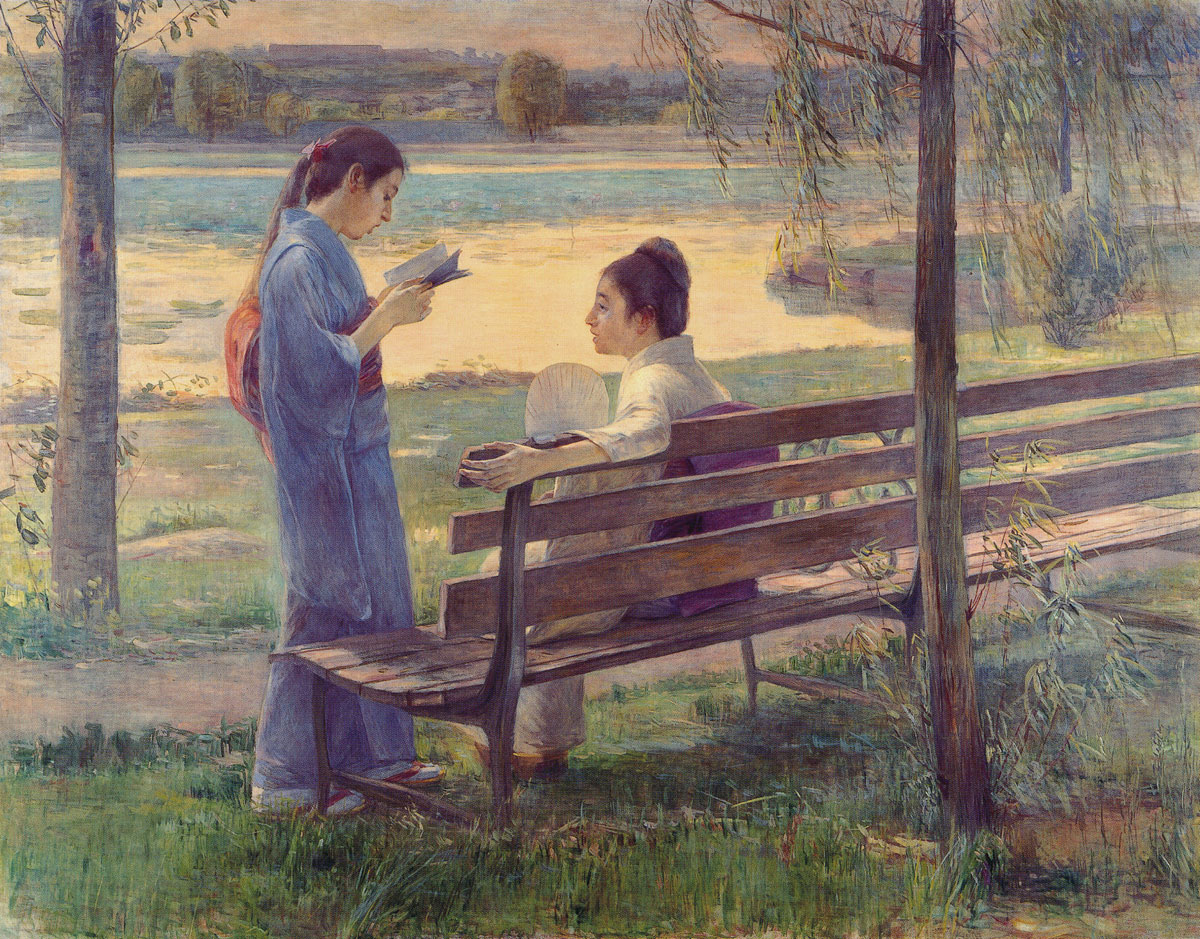
Teenage girls reading books, Summer Evening Beside the Lake (1897) by Fujishima Takeji

With the development of society, more and more girls are going to colleges to receive higher education. Today, more than half of Japanese women are college or university graduates. The proportion of female researchers in Japan is 14.6%.

Modern education of women began in earnest during the Meiji era's modernization campaign. The first schools for women began during this time, though education topics were highly gendered, with women learning arts of the samurai class, such as tea ceremonies and flower arrangement. The 1871 education code established that students should be educated "without any distinction of class or sex". Nonetheless, after 1891 students were typically segregated after third grade, and many girls did not extend their educations past middle school.

By the end of the Meiji period, there was a women's school in every prefecture in Japan, operated by a mix of government, missionary, and private interests. By 1910, very few universities accepted women. Graduation was not assured, as often women were pulled out of school to marry or to study "practical matters".

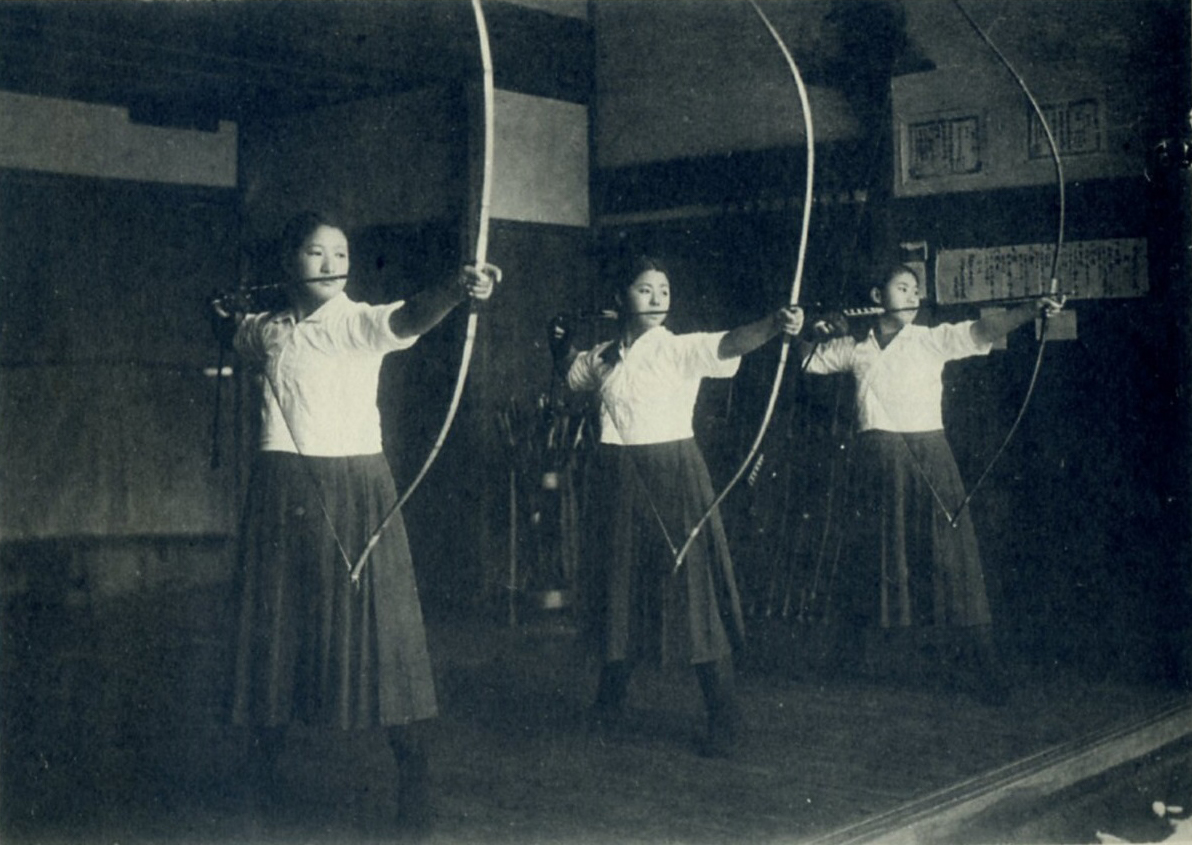
Girls' high school in early period, c. 1939

Notably, Tsuruko Haraguchi, the first woman in Japan to earn a PhD, did so in the US, as no Meiji-era institution would allow her to receive her doctorate. She and other women who studied abroad and returned to Japan, such as Yoshioka Yayoi and Tsuda Umeko, were among the first wave of women's educators who lead the way to the incorporation of women in Japanese academia.

After 1945, the Allied occupation aimed to enforce equal education between sexes; this included a recommendation in 1946 to provide compulsory co-education until the age of 16. By the end of 1947, nearly all middle schools and more than half of high schools were co-educational.

In 2012, 98.1% of female students and 97.8% of male students were able to reach senior high school. Of those, 55.6% of men and 45.8% of women continued with undergraduate studies, although 10% of these female graduates attended junior college.

== Culture ==
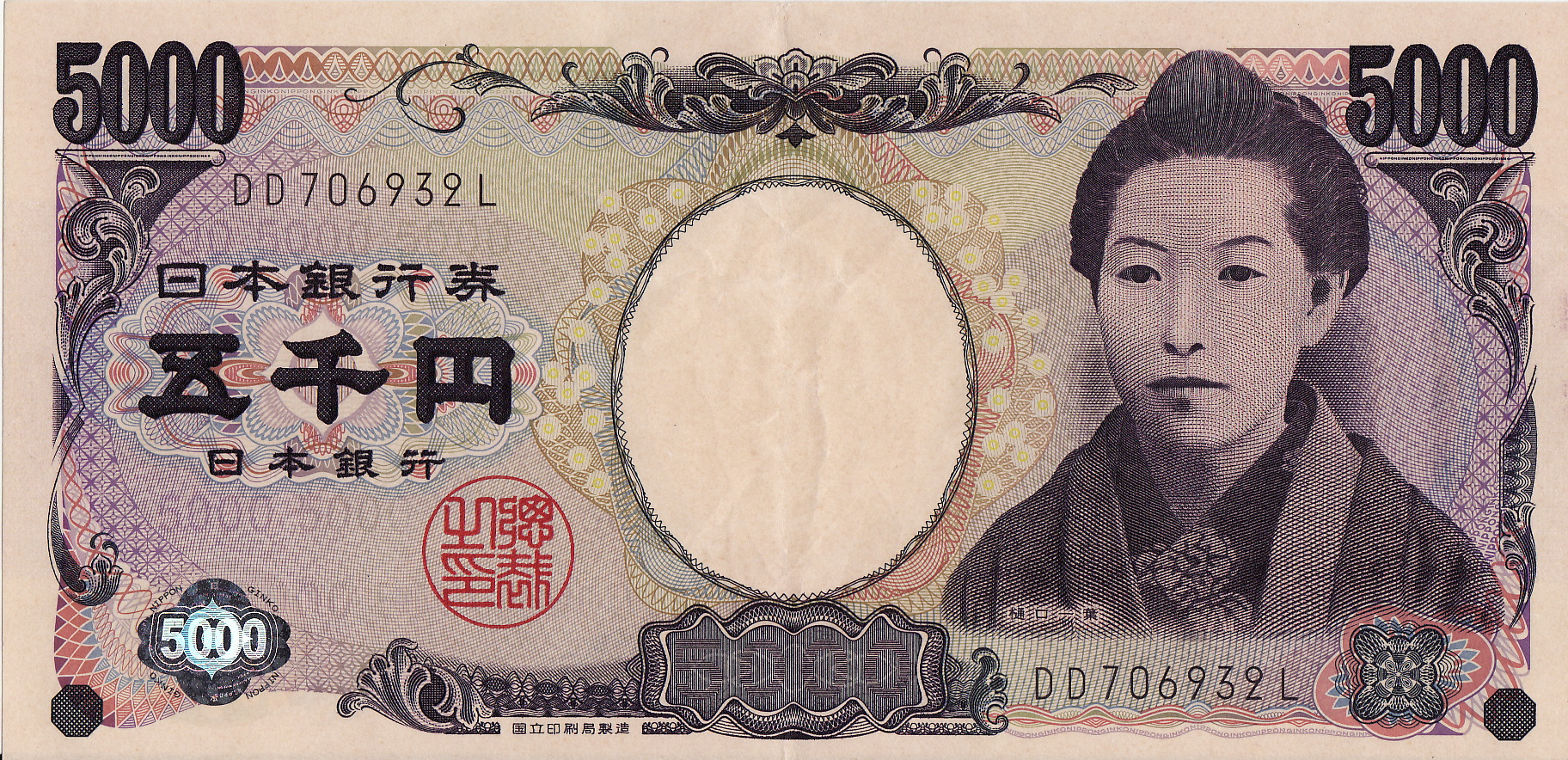
Portrait of Ichiyō Higuchi, pioneering female writer on 5000 yen banknote

Honoo (Flame), one of the representative works of Uemura Shōen, the first woman to be awarded the Order of Culture.

During the Heian period (794-1185), court culture flourished and Japanese women were active as writers. Murasaki Shikibu, who wrote The Tale of Genji, and Sei Shōnagon, who wrote The Pillow Book, are particularly famous. In the Kamakura period (1185-1333), when the samurai class seized power, the patriarchal system was respected and the activities of women writers declined.

It was not until the Meiji era (1868-1912) that women writers became highly active again. The most prominent women writers of this period were Ichiyō Higuchi and Akiko Yosano, and Higuchi's portrait was featured on the 5,000 yen bill. Yosano used female sensuality as the subject of her works and influenced the women's liberation movement in Japan. In 1891, Shimizu Shikin published Koware Yubiwa (The Broken Ring), often called Japan's first feminist novel, and in 1889, Kimura Akebono attracted attention for her portrayal of progressive women in Fujo no Kagami (A Great Example of Women). In 1911, Hiratsuka Raichō published Seitō (Bluestocking), the first literary magazine written by women, to which many women writers contributed. This magazine had a major impact on the women's liberation movement in Japan. Later, those involved in Seitō published Nyonin Geijutsu (Women's Arts).

In 1948, nihonga (Japanese style painting) painter Uemura Shōen became the first woman to be awarded the Order of Culture for breaking ground in bijin-ga (beautiful person picture) by depicting a new and different type of beauty.

According to Machiko Satonaka, from around 1975 to 2005, nearly half of professional manga artists in Japan were women. In Japan, illustration is a field in which women are well represented: In 2019, women accounted for 68.4 percent of illustrators.

As of 2026, three women in the field of culture have received the People's Honour Award: the singer Hibari Misora; Machiko Hasegawa, the creator of the manga series Sazae-san; and the actress Mitsuko Mori.

== Sports ==
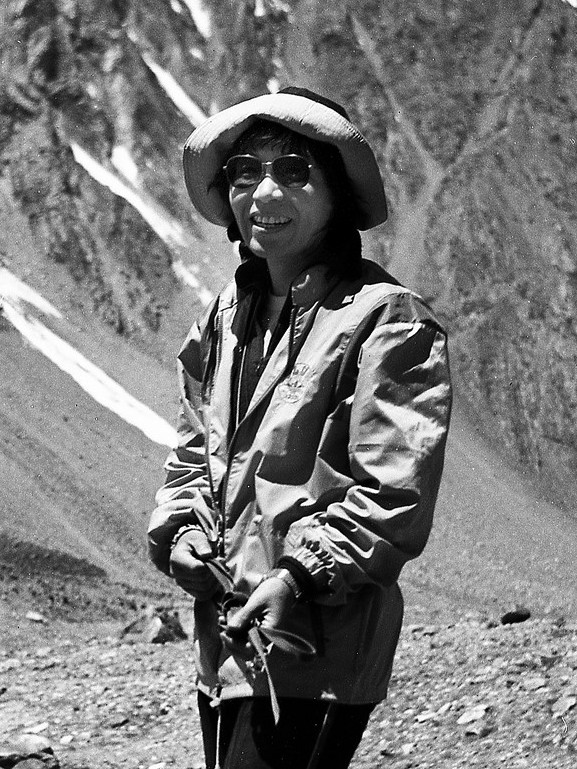
Junko Tabei

Kinue Hitomi won the silver medal in the women's 800 metres at the 1928 Summer Olympics, becoming the first Japanese woman and the first Asian woman to win an Olympic medal. Hideko Maehata later became the first Japanese and first Asian woman to win Olympic gold, capturing the women's 200 metre breaststroke event at the 1936 Summer Olympics.

In 1975, Junko Tabei became the first woman in the world to reach the summit of Mount Everest. In 1992, she also became the first woman to complete the Seven Summits by climbing the highest peaks on each of the seven continents.

As of 2026, three individuals and one team in the field of sport have received the People's Honour Award. They are Naoko Takahashi, who won the women's marathon at the 2000 Summer Olympics and became the first Japanese woman to win an Olympic gold medal in athletics; the Japan women's national football team, which won the 2011 FIFA Women's World Cup; Saori Yoshida, who achieved three consecutive Olympic gold medals and thirteen consecutive World Wrestling Championships titles in the women's 55 kilogram wrestling category and won more medals than any other wrestler in the history of freestyle wrestling; and Kaori Icho, who won four consecutive Olympic gold medals in women's wrestling and became the first woman in the world to win individual gold medals at four consecutive Olympic Games.

In 2018, Japanese bullfighting organizers lifted a ban on women entering the bullfighting ring.

A form of female sumo (女相撲, onnazumo) existed in some parts of Japan before professional sumo was established. However, women are not allowed to compete in professional sumo. They are also not allowed to enter the sumo ring (dohyō), a tradition stemming from Shinto and Buddhist beliefs that women are "impure" because of menstrual blood. Female sumo does exist on an amateur level.

According to a 2025 public opinion survey conducted by the Central Research Services, the ten sports of greatest interest among Japanese women, in terms of both participation and spectating, were, in descending order, baseball, volleyball, soccer, figure skating, table tennis, ekiden, sumo, basketball, marathon, and track and field. The most popular athlete was baseball player Shohei Ohtani, who ranked first by a wide margin with 54.5 percent. The only female athlete to make the list was figure skater Mao Asada who tied for eighth place with volleyball player Ran Takahashi.

In April of 2025, the Japan Shogi Association initiated a regulation banning players from playing in title matches for six weeks before and eight weeks after childbirth; however, this regulation was removed in December of that same year. Instead, childbirth and pregnancy became listed that year as reasons for changing the schedule of matches.

Women's professional wrestling has been a staple of Japanese sports and culture for decades, with notable promotions including Stardom and TJPW operated in the country. Wrestlers from Japan like Asuka, Kairi Sane, Iyo Sky, Riho, and Hikaru Shida have experienced international fame overseas.

Women's snowboarding and skateboarding have both seen numerous Olympic and international medalists for Japan including Liz Akama, Mari Fukada, Cocona Hiraki, Kokomo Murase, Momiji Nishiya, Mitsuki Ono, Tomoka Takeuchi, Sena Tomita, Coco Yoshizawa, and Sakura Yosozumi. Japan hosted the 1998 Winter (Nagano) and 2020 Summer (Tokyo) Olympic Games where both snowboarding and skateboarding were introduced as official IOC events, with the latter event seeing Yosozumi and Nishiya become the first female skateboarders to be Olympic gold medalists in park and street, respectively.

== Religion ==
The first female Zen master in Japan was the Japanese abbess Mugai Nyodai (born 1223 - died 1298).

In 1872, the Japanese government issued an edict (May 4, 1872, Grand Council of State Edict 98) stating, "Any remaining practices of female exclusion on shrine and temple lands shall be immediately abolished, and mountain climbing for the purpose of worship, etc., shall be permitted". However, women in Japan today do not have complete access to all such places.

In 1998 the General Assembly of the Nippon Sei Ko Kai (Anglican Church in Japan) started to ordain women.

== Health ==
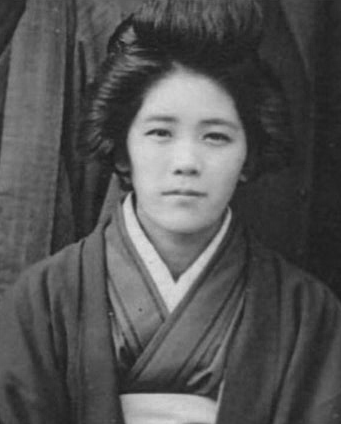
Kane Tanaka

At 87.2 years, the life expectancy of Japanese women is the longest of any sex anywhere in the world. Kane Tanaka lived for 119 years and 107 days, making her the second longest-lived verified person of all time.

Abortion in Japan is legal under some restrictions. The number per year has declined by 500,000 since 1975. Of the 200,000 abortions performed per year, however, 10% are teenage women, a number which has risen since 1975.

== Beauty ==
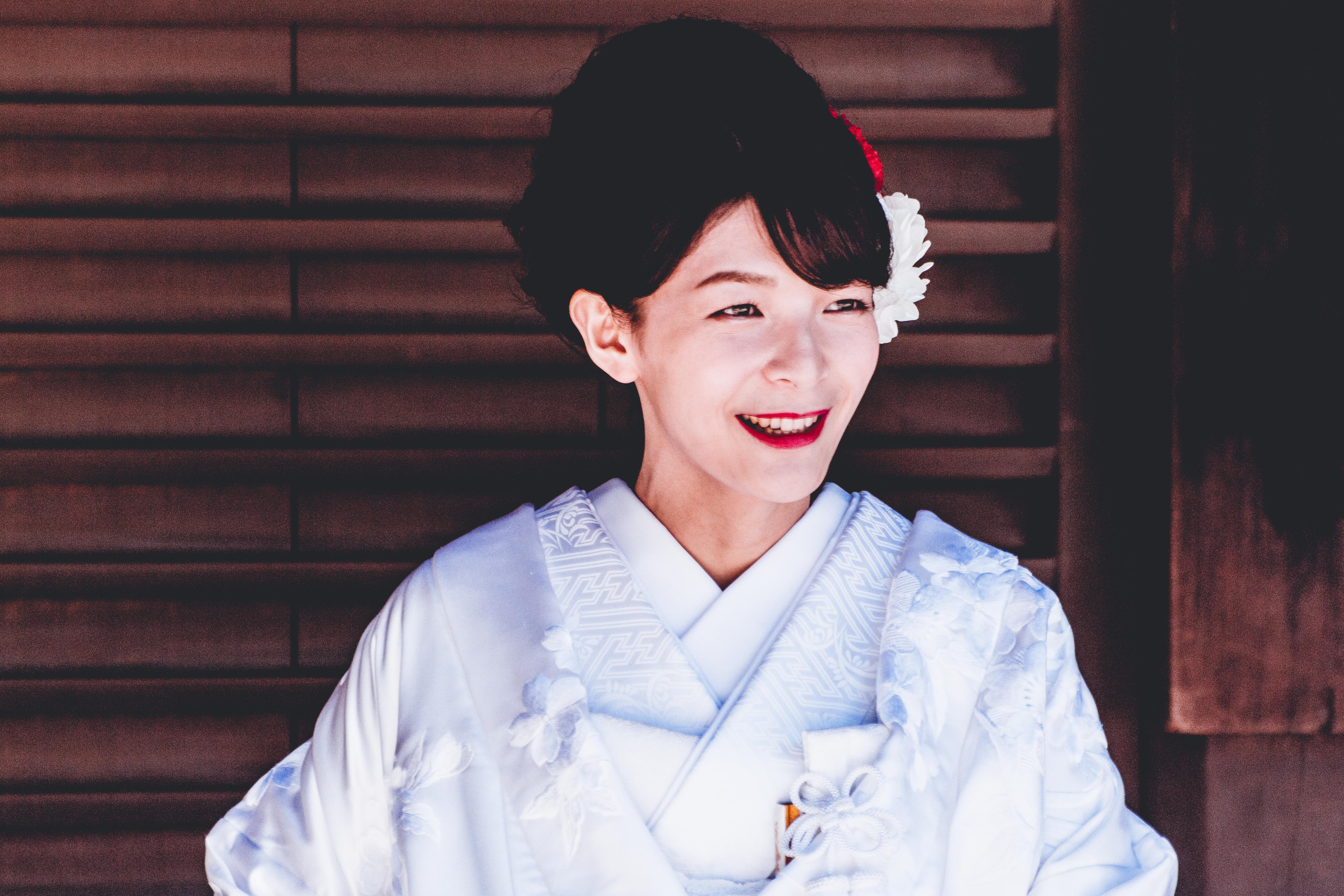
A Kimono-clad woman

The Japanese cosmetics industry is the second largest in the world, earning over $15 billion per year. The strong market for beauty products has been connected to the value placed on self-discipline and self-improvement in Japan, where the body is mastered through kata, repeated actions aspiring toward perfection, such as bowing.

In the Heian period, feminine beauty standards favored darkened teeth, some body fat, and eyebrows painted above the original (which were shaved).

Beauty corporations have had a role in creating contemporary standards of beauty in Japan since the Meiji era. For example, the Japanese cosmetics firm, Shiseido published a magazine, Hannatsubaki, with beauty advice for women emphasizing hair styles and contemporary fashion. The pre-war "modern girl" of Japan followed Western fashions as filtered through this kind of Japanese media.

Products reflect several common anxieties among Japanese women. Multiple polls suggest that women worry about "fatness, breast size, hairiness and bust size". The idealized figure of a Japanese woman is generally fragile and petite. Japanese beauty ideals favor small features and narrow faces. Big eyes are admired, especially when they have "double eyelids".

Another ideal is pale skin. Tanned skin was historically associated with the working-class, and pale skin associated with the nobility. Many women in Japan will take precaution to avoid the sun, and some lotions are sold to make the skin whiter.

By the 1970s, "cuteness" had emerged as a desirable aesthetic, which some scholars linked to a boom in comic books that emphasized young-looking girls, or Lolitas. While these characters typically included larger eyes, research suggests that it was not a traditional standard of beauty in Japan, preferred in medical research and described as "unsightly" by cosmetic researchers of the Edo era.

Clothing is another element in beauty standards for women in Japan, especially with traditional aesthetics. Again, femininity is a large factor; therefore, pinks, reds, bows, and frills are all found in their apparel. Kimonos, full-length silk robes, are worn by women on special occasions. Traditional patterns for women include many varieties of flowers found in Japan and across Asia such as cherry blossoms, lilies, chrysanthemums and camellia japonica flowers.

Some employers require their female workers to wear high heels and forbid eye glasses.

== Contraception and sexuality ==
The percentage of births to unmarried women in selected countries, 1980 and 2007. As can be seen in the figure, Japan has not followed the trend of other Western countries of children born outside of marriage to the same degree.

In Japan, the contraceptive pill was legalized in 1999, much later than in most Western countries. Its use is still low, with many couples preferring condoms. Sexuality in Japan has developed separately from mainland Asia, and Japan did not adopt the Confucian view of marriage in which chastity is highly valued. However, births outside marriage remain rare in Japan.

== Laws of protection ==
=== Domestic violence ===
In Japan, domestic disputes have traditionally been seen as a result of negligence or poor support from the female partner. A partner's outburst can therefore be a source of shame to the wife or mother of the man they are supposed to care for. Because women's abuse would be detrimental to the family of the abused, legal, medical and social intervention in domestic disputes was rare.

After a spate of research during the 1990s, Japan passed the Prevention of Spousal Violence and the Protection of Victims act in 2001. The law referred to domestic violence as "a violation of the constitutional principle of equal rights between sexes". This law established protection orders from abusive spouses and created support centers in every prefecture, but women are still reluctant to report abuse to doctors out of shame or fear that the report would be shared with the abuser. A 2001 survey showed that many health professionals were not trained to handle domestic abuse and blamed women who sought treatment.

In 2013, 100,000 women reported domestic violence to shelters. Of the 10,000 entering protective custody at the shelter, nearly half arrived with children or other family members.

=== Stalking ===
Anti-stalking laws were passed in 2000 after the media attention given to the murder of a university student who had been a stalking victim. With nearly 21,000 reports of stalking in 2013, 90.3% of the victims were women and 86.9% of the perpetrators were men. Anti-stalking laws in Japan were expanded in 2013 to include e-mail harassment, after the widely publicized 2012 murder of a young woman who had reported such harassment to police. The number of stalker-related consultations with police continued to decline from 2017 to 2022, but in 2023, the number of consultations increased for the first time in six years, to a total of 19,843.

=== Sex trafficking ===
Historically, Japanese women, who were referred to as Karayuki-san, were trafficked and forced to sexual slavery in America, Siberia, Chosen (Korea), Hong Kong, Singapore, etc. in early 20th century.

Japanese and foreign women and girls have been victims of sex trafficking in Japan. They are raped in brothels and other locations and experience physical and psychological trauma. Japanese anti-sex trafficking legislation and laws have been criticized as being lacking.

=== Sexual assault ===
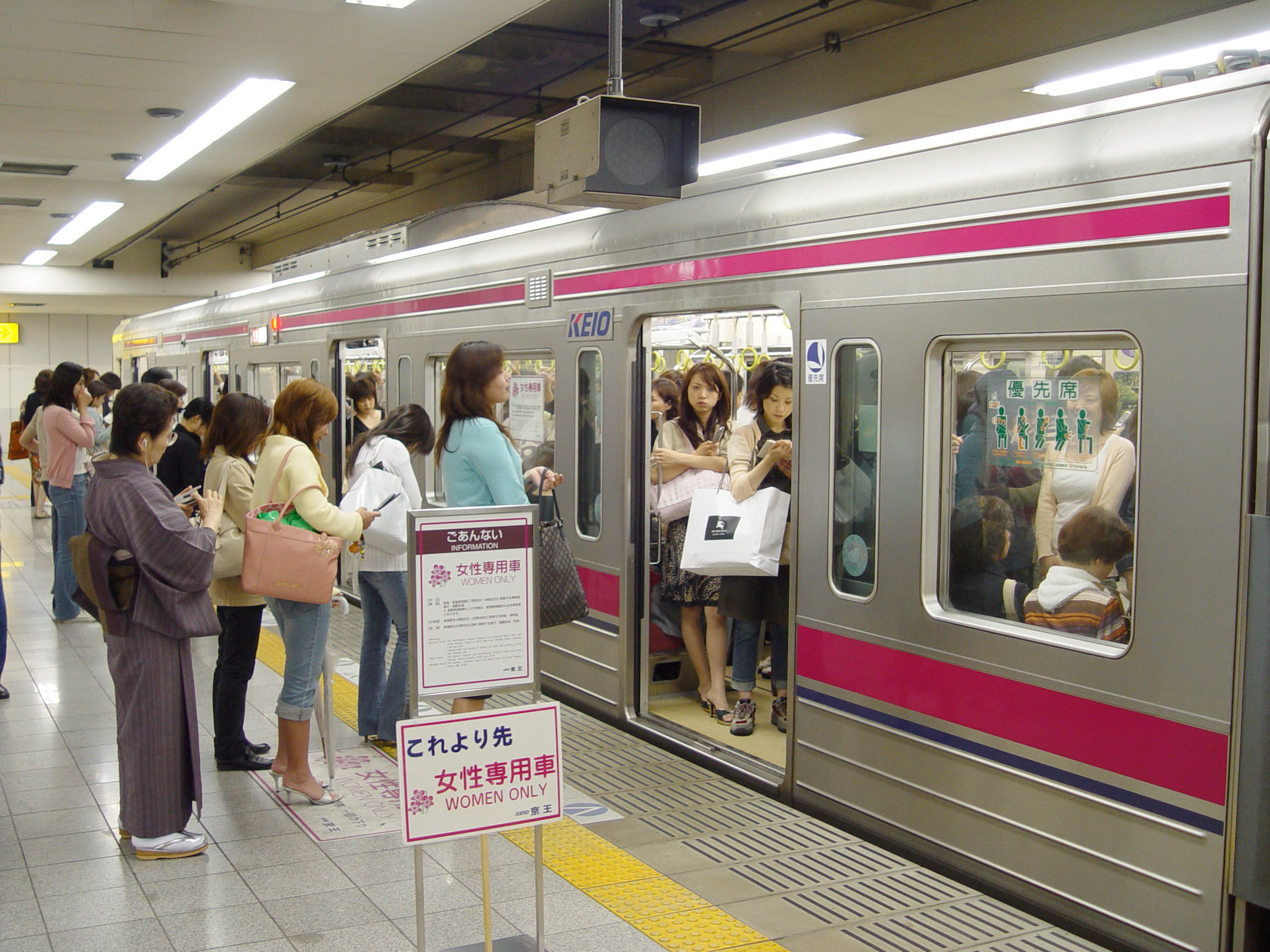
Women-only passenger cars were introduced to combat groping and sexual harassment.

Surveys show that between 28% and 70% of women have been groped on train cars. Some railway companies designate women-only passenger cars though there are no penalties for men to ride in a women-only car. Gropers can be punished with seven years or less of jail time and/or face fines of just under $500.

The use of women-only cars in Japan has been critiqued from various perspectives. Some suggest that the presence of the cars makes women who choose not to use them more vulnerable. Public comment sometimes include the argument that women-only cars are a step too far in protecting women. Some academics have argued that the cars impose the burden of social segregation to women, rather than seeking the punishment of criminals. Another critique suggests the cars send the signal that men create a dangerous environment for women, who cannot protect themselves.

== Public opinion surveys on women's social status and reported happiness ==
According to a 2024 public opinion survey on perceptions of gender equality conducted by the Cabinet Office of Japan, 61 percent of respondents stated that men are socially favored, 30 percent said that men and women are equal, and 9 percent said that women are favored.

However, international comparative surveys such as the World Values Survey and the International Social Survey Programme indicate a different pattern with respect to self reported happiness. In the majority of countries worldwide, women are more likely than men to report lower levels of happiness in their lives. In Japan, however, women have consistently reported higher levels of happiness in their lives than men, and the gender gap favoring women is often the largest observed among participating countries. Newsweek has suggested that this phenomenon may reflect differing social expectations for men and women. According to its analysis, institutional disadvantages historically faced by women, such as restrictions related to suffrage and inheritance, have largely been eliminated, and women have also become less constrained by traditional Confucian moral norms prescribing an ideal female role. By contrast, men are still strongly expected to serve as primary breadwinners within the family. As a result, it speculates that men’s levels of happiness may be lower relative to those of women.

== See also ==
- Birth control in Japan
- Class S (genre)
- Empress of Japan
- Family policy in Japan
- Feminism in Japan
- Gender Equality Bureau, Japan
- Good Wife, Wise Mother
- Gyaru
- Hinamatsuri
- Kyariaūman (career woman in Japan)
- Overview of gender inequality in Japan
- Shōjo
- Women in agriculture in Japan
- Yamato nadeshiko
- Nyonin Kinsei Women in Shinto
- Women in Asia

History:

- Kunoichi, female spies
- Onna-musha, female warriors
