= Gender inequality in Japan =

Japan's gender inequality history

Even in the modern era, gender inequality remains an issue in Japan. In the 2019 Gender Inequality Index report, it was ranked the 17th least unequal out of the participating 162 countries, ahead of Germany, the UK and the US, performing especially well on the reproductive health and higher education attainment indices. Despite this, gender inequality still exists in Japan due to the persistence of gender norms in Japanese society rooted in traditional religious values and certain Meiji-era government reforms. Gender inequality manifests in various aspects such as family, political representation, education, and employment, occurring largely due to gender roles. Inequality also lies within divorce of heterosexual couples and the marriage of same sex couples due to both a lack of protective divorce laws and the presence of restrictive marriage laws. In consequence to these traditional gender roles, self-rated health surveys show variances in reported poor health, population decline, reinforced gendered education and social expectations, and inequalities in the LGBTQ+ community.

== Historical, traditional, and modern views ==
=== Meiji government restructure of the Japanese state ===
Between 1878 and 1883, when the Meiji government restructured the state, Japanese women's political and legal rights were significantly reduced. This restructure paved the way for solidifying Japan's legal structure, but introduced new laws and terms regarding kōmin, "citizens or subjects," and kōken/ri, "public rights." Following additional laws regarding male-only succession, women were excluded from these classifications. As such, they were barred from voting and participation in politics. These restructures were influenced by France and other European countries, which were visited by hōsei kanryō, "young legislative bureaucrats," elite young men who would meld European law and theory with traditional Tokugawa samurai teachings, which were paternalistic. These laws would remain in place until WWII, with a few exceptions.

=== Family values ===
Japan's family dynamics have historically been defined by a two-person, female housewife or caregiver role and a male income-earner role, a historically common division of labor between the sexes. After Japan's involvement in World War II ended, the resulting Japanese Constitution included Article 24, "the Gender Equality Clause," which was introduced to steer the country towards gender equality. However, deeply embedded family and gender norms led to resistance among citizens, and the culture remained largely the same as of 2009.

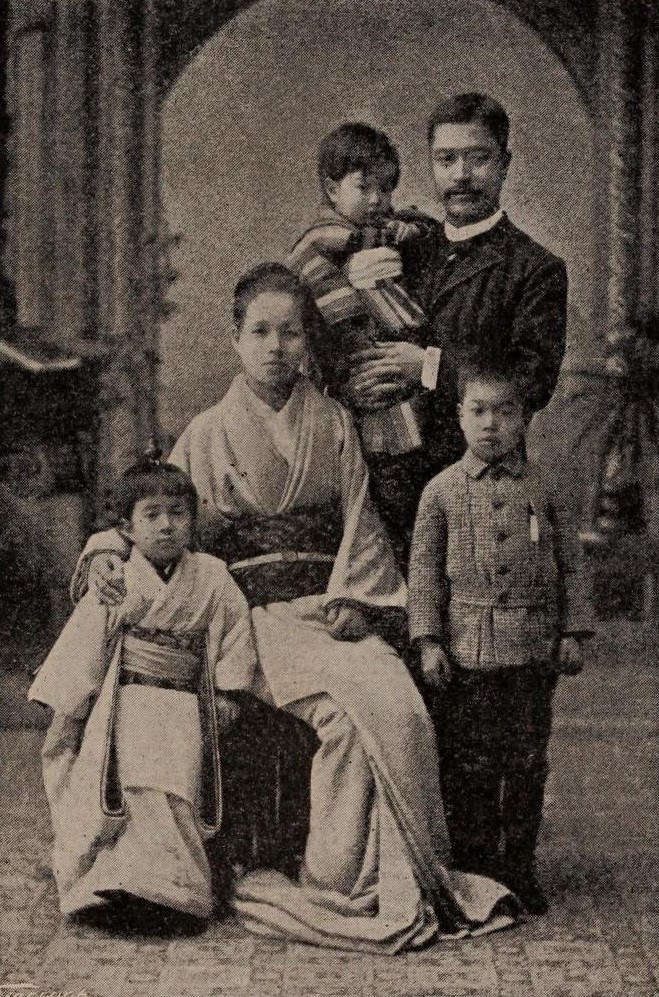
Image of a Japanese family in the 19th century taking a family photograph

Following World War II, the "professional housewife" or sengyō shufu, arose. The idea of professionalism regarding this type of domestic labor is similar to any other profession, as it requires significant knowledge, skill, and at least partial autonomy. The primary role for a professional housewife is childrearing, which remains a highly stigmatized topic for women and married couples, wherein only 2% of children are born out of wedlock, and women who do not marry or have children after marriage are met with social "hostility." In a 2013 poll, over 50% of twenty-year-old participants confirmed the traditional gendered labor division of men working outside the home and women within, which is even further enforced through tax policies regarding primary and secondary income sources.

It was not until the mid-1970s that Japanese women began to play a larger role in the paid economy. Japanese men, however, generally did not step in to play a larger role in the house. Studies have shown that there is a negative correlation between the number of hours worked by fathers in their jobs and the amount of housework (including childcare) that the father provides. After paid work, the father would come home, spending most of his time eating or in non-social interactions such as watching TV with his family. This led to the term "Japan Inc.," synonymous with males committing their life to their job while in a long-term relationship.

Another term that became popular in Japan was the "relationship-less society", describing how men's long work hours left little or no time for them to bond with their families. Japanese society came to be one of isolation within the household, since there was only enough time after work to care for oneself, excluding the rest of the family. This held especially true for families who wished to have a second child. Due to corporations and work regulation laws, men of all ages in large firms are forced to prioritize work over the rest of their life. The limited amount of help from their male spouses leaves women with the majority of household chores.

=== Religion ===
The "Feminism, Religion, and Peace Group" (フェミニズム・宗教・平和の会) was founded in 1986 and led by the late Okuda Akiko 奥田暁子 and Okano Haruko 岡野治子. It began with the publication of the journal Womanspirit. This group was patroned by women of Christian and Buddhist religions, who gathered to discuss traditional androcentric Buddhist teachings in connection with their own experiences in an effort to realign tradition and contemporary feminist theology, and "overcome traditional gender discrimination in Judeo-Christian religions."

Gender roles in Japan are deeply entwined with the East Asian country's religious and cultural history. Japan's most popular philosophy, Confucianism, enforces gendered rules relating to fashion and public behavior. For instance, from a young age, Japanese men are taught the importance of professional success, higher education, honoring the family name, and providing for the family. In the Confucian tradition, women only receive education through middle school, and are taught to focus on being respectful, learning to cook, and taking care of children. Under this framework, women are not supposed to have a paying job.

=== Divorce ===
In Japan, the process of getting a divorce is considered a personal family issue in which the Japanese government does not get extremely involved in except to provide legal papers that need to be consensually signed by both partners in the marriage. Partners have the option to get divorced through the family court system or through simple registration at their ward. Divorce in the late 70's in Japan was usually due to adultery, financial problems, and incompatibility, however divorces now are most often due to incompatibility with personalities followed by abuse and violence by the husband. In cases that involve domestic violence or abuse, most often women are left at a disadvantage, being left with limited economic opportunities post-divorce due to discrimination and unequal distributions of assets.

=== Abortion and contraception ===
Abortion is legal in Japan. However, women need their partner's permission to have an abortion. Both surgery and abortion pills are done in a hospital. Only 3% of women use contraceptives, and condoms are the mainstream method of birth control. In 2023, the morning-after pill will be available on a trial basis at some pharmacies without a prescription. Implants and injectables are not allowed in Japan. In October 2024, the United Nations Committee on the Elimination of Discrimination against Women called on the Japanese government to amend the law to end the provision requiring women to obtain their husband's consent for induced abortions.

== LGBTQ+ marriage rights and violence in law ==
Gender norms in Japan adversely affect LGBTQ+ people. Due to the perceived social importance of marriage, single men are often passed for promotions as they are seen lacking leadership and managerial skills, while women in their 30s also become stagnant, as that is the age where women typically marry and start a family. This inhibits the career advancement of LGBTQ+ individuals.

The culture of 'eroticized violence' is quite present in Japan which sexualizes and mistreats the female body and influences laws that encourages conformity and homogeneity in the legal restraints and lawmaking surrounding sexual violence. These inequalities affect individuals who do not identify with heterosexual marriage norms through ways including social and legal discrimination in the work place, education, healthcare, and housing, and legal discrimination stemming from the Japanese family registry.

== Social Stratification Mobility Survey ==
The Social Stratification and Mobility (SSM) survey was first conducted in 1955 and has been conducted every decade since. The first survey aimed to study Japan's economic foundation. A large-scale survey like the SSM has its problems: Many local issues go unnoticed and inequality stays hidden within households until a more focused survey can unveil more. However, even this survey was a major step toward national awareness around issues of gender equality.

In the fourth survey, completed in 1985, there was a significant recorded movement towards equality. Up until it, women were only counted as housewives and family business labor (help with family-owned businesses, like farm work) did not count toward measures of economic mobility. It is here that we finally start to see a shift toward a more equal culture.

== The Equal Employment Opportunity Law ==
With national surveys finally including women, the Japanese government introduced the Equal Employment Opportunity Law (EEOL). Before its enactment, women could generally only get labor-intensive jobs in poor working conditions, mostly on farms or in unsafe factories. Most other women found jobs as secretaries or assistants. Post-EEOL Japan began to see blue collar jobs fill up with machines, allowing women to have better opportunities elsewhere in society.

The Equal Employment Opportunity Law aimed to create equality within the workforce for people of all genders. However, women were still being discriminated against in every field. Despite constant discrimination, modern Japan continues to push forward with support from the EEOL (and other equality laws like the Convention on the Elimination of All Forms of Discrimination against Women (CEDAW)) toward safer and better-paying jobs for women.

== Women in politics ==
Women began to make meaningful inroads in Japanese politics beginning in the 1980s. However, according to the Inter-parliamentary Union (5, 183), female representation within Japanese politics fell from 79th out of 177 countries in 1997 to 165th out of 193 countries in 2019. This comes in spite of a call from the United Nations to increase female representation in politics and a successful election of the Democratic Party of Japan (DPJ) where more women were elected to office. However, the DPJ made no reforms for further election or the prioritization of women in office, and due to poor performance, the party dissolved in 2017. In 2014, Prime Minister Shinzo Abe placed five women into political roles within his cabinet. Of these, only three kept their positions due to scandals related to workplace sexism. Recent years have seen the rise of Mama Giin (mommy politicians), particularly at the local assembly level. The percentage of female members announced in 2024 is 10.4% in the House of Representatives and 26.8% in the House of Councilors.

In 2025, Sanae Takaichi was elected as the first female President of the Liberal Democratic Party, making her the country's first female prime minister. However, many saw Takaichi likely becoming the country's first female prime minister as a "conundrum" for gender equality given Japan's high gender inequality and Takaichi's own policies. The Associated Press wrote that Takaichi "is an ultra-conservative star of a male-dominated party that critics call an obstacle to women’s advancement" in a "country that ranks poorly internationally for gender equality". Takaichi's political rise in the LDP was called a "paradox" while some believed that her becoming prime minister would not have an impact on gender inequality given her conservative views.

== Gender Inequality Index ==
Gender Inequality Index for 2019, featuring Japan on the far right in a dark green

The Gender Inequality Index (GII) has Japan ranked as 19th out of 188 countries in 2019. The GII measures three things: reproductive health, empowerment and the labor market. For this index, where 0 represents full equality and 1 is total inequality, Japan places at 0.116.

The Gender Inequality Index confirms that Japan has room for improvement. The country still lacks female voices in parliament, compared to similar Asian countries: Japan ranks as fourth lowest within the 51 highest developed countries. In terms of women in the labor force, Japan has the sixth lowest score. However, Japan ranks fairly well when it comes to adolescent birth rate and the percentage of the female population with some secondary education. Overall, the country is ranked among the countries with the lowest GII because of its high scores in reproductive healthcare and women's education levels.

== Gender inequality in education ==
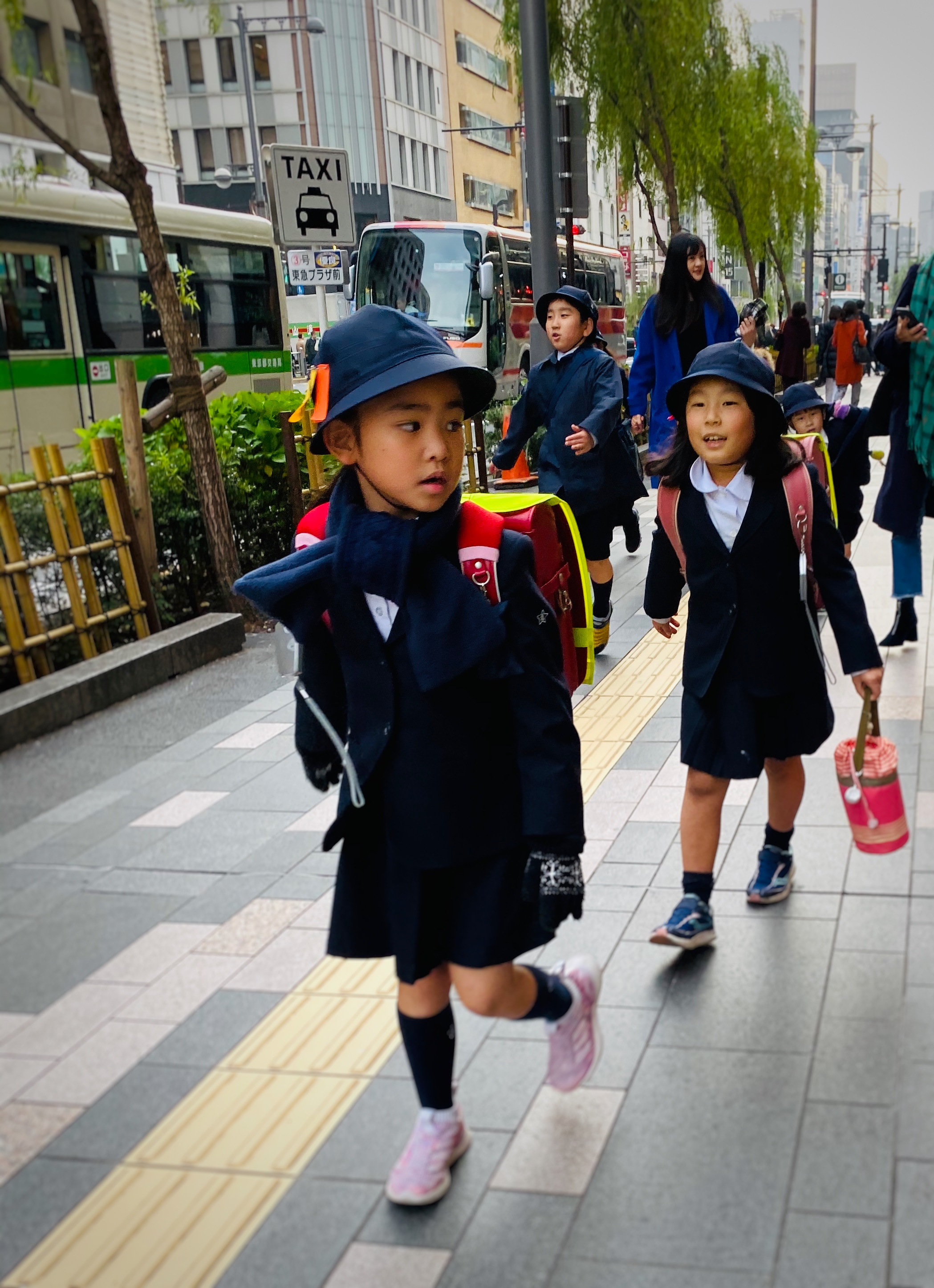
School children in Tokyo, December 2019

In Japanese society today, there is practically no gender gap in education, and gender inequality has been overall declining in Japan, however Japan has not historically been this way. When structuralized education was in early modernization, there were huge limitations for female opportunity in all education levels: elementary attendance was low, secondary education opportunities were limited, and higher education was not an option. However, things began to change slowly throughout the 19th century and continued to change through the end of WWII for equal educational opportunities. After WWII, gender equality in education along with democratization, sexual equality, and change in the employment structure were at full speed and prompted many changes towards a more equal society.

Contrarily, in 2018, it was revealed that several university medical schools, Tokyo Medical University, Juntendo University, and Kitasato University, favored male applicants by using different passing marks for men and women. In Japan, the ratios of female doctors compared to male doctors are relatively low, and the overall numbers of them are only 21.1%. This shows that Japan has a major gender gap in the medical field, and falls behind amongst all the G7 countries.

Higher education comes with different social expectations for men and women. While a college-educated man might have an advantage with marriage, the same cannot be said for women. Additionally, nearly 76% of parents expected some form of financial support from their sons, while only 6% had similar expectations from their daughters. This stems from the labor gap between men and women, as the financial return is likely to be higher for men.

== Gender gap in employment and wages ==
Gender wage gap in OECD

The gender gap in employment and wages is becoming an increasingly serious problem, with Japan being the fastest aging country in the OECD. To maintain its economy, the government must take measures to maintain productivity. While women hold 45.4 percent of Japan's bachelor degrees, they only make up 18.2 percent of the labor force, and only 2.1 percent of employers are women.

There are several theories explaining women's low workforce participation. One points to the importance of family in Japanese society. This emphasis on the male-breadwinner model persists because government tax policies and company benefits are not as beneficial for women, especially women with families. There is a government policy that guarantees healthcare and pensions for spouses who make less than 1.3 million yen, or about $11,500, thus discouraging couples from both working. Japanese companies have extensive benefits for men because they are expected to provide for their families at home. Job salaries and benefits are also heavily influenced by tenure and seniority, making it hard for women with families to advance in regular employment.

There is also a large gap in wages between men and women. In 2005, Japan had a gender wage gap of 32.8 percent, which decreased to 25.7 percent in 2017. Japan has the third highest wage gap in the OECD. The country's long work hours create an environment that reinforces the wage gap because there is a disproportional difference between how much time men and women spend on paid and unpaid work. On average, women spend 5.5 hours on unpaid housework per day, whereas men only spend one hour. Men do very little housework in Japan, and this is part of the gendered labor division. The Japanese prioritization of seniority hurts the women who want to have children first, as promotions will be awarded much later in life. The number of women in upper-level positions (managers, CEOs, and politicians, and the like) is rather low. Women only make up 3.4 percent of seats in Japanese companies' board of directors. According to scholars, to remove barriers against women, the government must introduce more women- and family-friendly policies.

Labor market segregation is associated with the gender wage gap. After World War II, the state made decisions to divide the labor pool by gender. Findings show that majority-female workplaces have 5.1% lower wages than majority-male workplaces, for all genders. This percentage only accounts for full-time workers and does not account for part-time female workers who may also be raising children.

Historically, male-dominated society was normal in general, and a part of the "Japanese culture." Originally, politicians were mainly men, and they held the power all to their hands. Therefore, there is distinctly a perception in the political workplace, but after the late 1980s, people gradually started to embrace the importance of women needed in the political aspect.

An alternative theory, the Compensating Wage Differential hypothesis, states that women are not forced into these jobs per se, but instead that they pick and choose their occupations based on the benefits package that each provide. From work availability to health compensation, women may choose to have a lower wage to have certain job benefits. A study by Wei-hsin Yu shows that there is also a connection between wage raises if you are currently working in an environment that includes a majority of women.

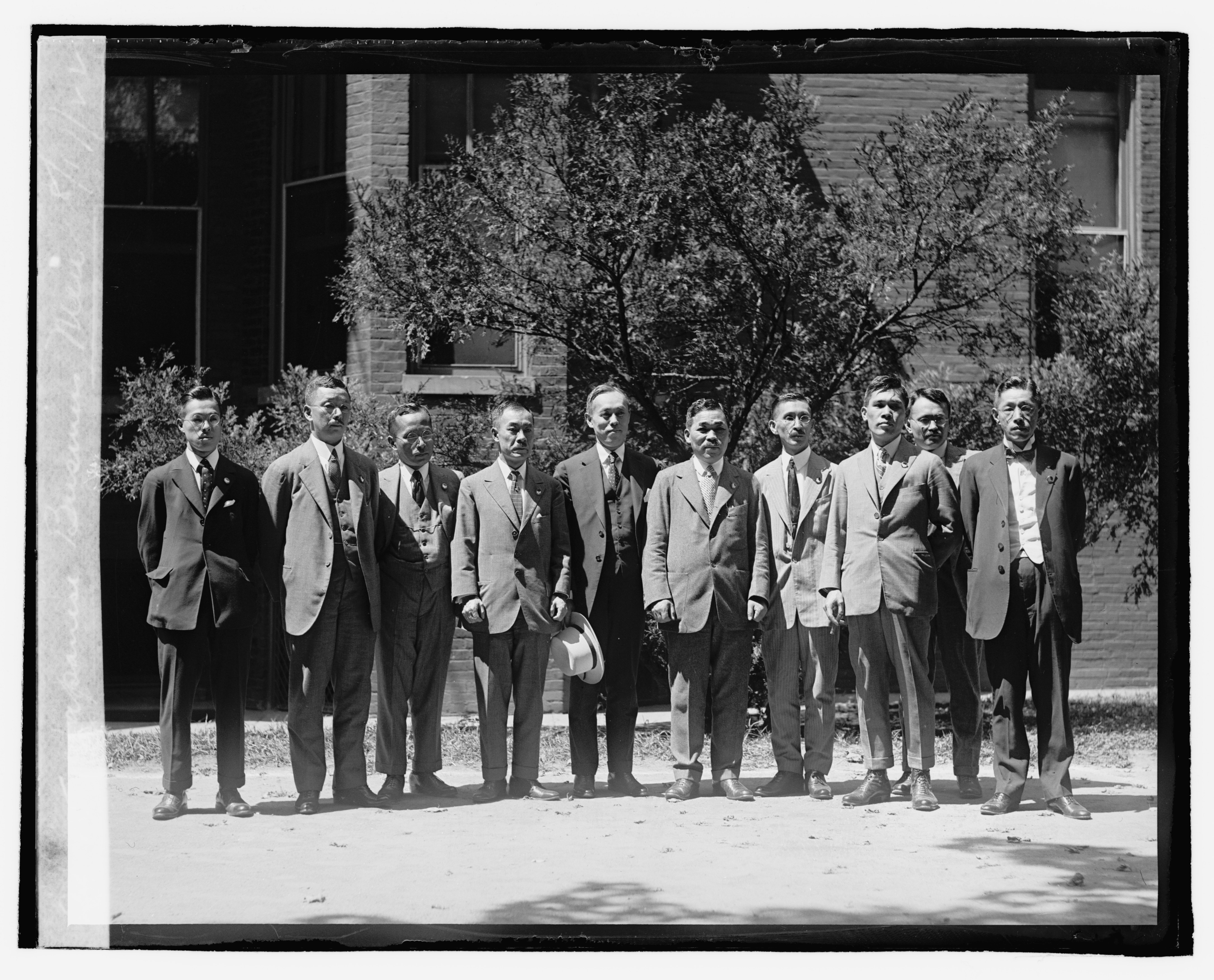
Old photo of Japanese business men gathered to take a photograph

A competing theory from Mary Brinton suggests that the government is structured around devices that disallow women to find "good jobs." A fourth key theory comes from Higuchi Keiko, which claims that changes in public policy are needed to encourage gender diversity in the workplace. Keiko argues that existing government policies disincentivize women from working. One such law pushed in the 1960s was called hitozukuri policy, or human-making policy, which burdened women with the responsibility to reproduce a new generation capable of economic success.

== Self-Rated Health surveys ==
The United Nations Development Programme correlates the Human Development Index with the Gender Empowerment measure. That is, the lower women's social status, the lower overall social health, which includes men. However, Japan and South Korea are outliers.

While there was almost no gender gap in poor SRH in Japan, men reported a higher prevalence of poor SRH in late-middle age to old age (50–70 years). There are two notable social implications that may explain the difference in rates. First, it may be a product of Japanese "masculinity" and the social norms surrounding poor health, i.e. smoking, drinking, poor diet, and delaying medical attention when needed. Secondly, many of men's social relations revolve around work, and at retirement these relationships disappear, which may impact their mental health.

== See also ==
- Gender Equality Bureau
- Genderless fashion in Japan
- Family policy in Japan
- Feminism in Japan
- Kyariaūman
- Women in Japan
