= Kyariaūman =

Japanese term for a career woman

A kyariaūman (キャリアウーマン) is a Japanese term for a career woman. The term refers to the type of Japanese woman, married or not, that pursues a career to make a living and for personal advancement rather than being a housewife without occupation outside the home. The term came into use when women were expected to marry and become housewives after a short period working as an "office lady".

The term is used in Japan to describe the counterpart to the Japanese salaryman; a career woman in Japan also works for a salary, and seeks to supplement her family's income through work or to remain independent by seeking an independent career.

== History ==
=== Early history ===
In the early history of Japan, the status of women were higher as they were thought to have the special ability to communicate with spiritual or divine beings known as kami. The Japanese sun deity, Amaterasu, was female and reflects the sacred role of women in traditional Japanese matriarchal society. The social status of women began to decline in the beginning of the Muromachi period (1336). Following the Muromachi age and well into the late 1800s, lower-class women still received equal treatment compared to men in many areas. They were granted freedom of marriage, love, and equal treatment in regards to work, as they worked under much the same conditions as men.

Women of the elite classes were bound by a newly reformed version of Shinto, with heavy influences of Confucianism. Under the Confucian ethic of "three obediences" women were expected to show subservience to their fathers as girls, to their husbands as wives, and to their children in old age. This began the traditional Japanese image of the "Good Wife, Wise Mother" in which women were supposed to remain as housewives after marriage, caring for the household, cooking, sewing, and being subservient to their husbands. This, however, only proved a problem for women in the working world during the Meiji era (1868–1912). Despite class distinctions being abolished, Confucian ethics had penetrated into the culture, robbing women of most of their equal status. Women on farmlands still maintained some level of freedom with work, tending the fields with their husbands and children. Throughout the modernization of Japan, women were denied many of their rights, including the right to work in jobs filled primarily by men, to be paid comparably, and to work in a system that rewarded talent over seniority and sex.

=== Feminism in Japan ===
Raicho Hiratsuka, the founder of the Seitō (Bluestocking) publication

During the Meiji era, Haru Hiratsuka took up the pen name Raicho Hiratsuka and founded the first all-women literary magazine called Seitō, with a number of other like minded contributors. Seitō was published in 1911 with 134 pages at the start and only 1,000 copies were printed, but the launch of the magazine began the feminist movement in Japan. Hiratsuka herself stated in her first essay, "In the beginning, woman was truly the sun. An authentic person. Now she is the moon, a wan and sickly moon, dependent on another, reflecting another's brilliance." Indicating that women had fallen from their position of power as representations of the divine and were made subservient, reflecting the grandeur of others, becoming practically invisible on their own.

In the era of Westernization, more women were becoming educated and began to demand for their legal rights. Female leaders began to emerge in various positions in limit scale. The declining workforce in the aftermath of the First World War encouraged women to march for their equal rights. Though Seitō remained active only through 1915, Hiratsuka became a powerful figure to women everywhere in Japan.

One of her most important reforms, in 1919, was the petition to revise Article 5 of the police security regulations put into law in the year 1900. This severely limited the ability for women to attend political meetings or gather political information, which, as Hiratsuka noted, put working women at a disadvantage, because being politically knowledgeable was a partial necessity to have any hope of employment in the male dominated work force.

=== Second World War ===
During the Second World War, there was a major shortage of domestic workforce as majority of the men were drafted to join the military. Women, who had been primarily relegated to office work or more likely, bound to the home, began to seek employment to supplement their husbands' military incomes. This led to a small expansion of their capabilities. The influx of working women into the manufacturing industry to aid the war effort proved invaluable to the Japanese economy.

Following World War II, men returned home to start work again, but women were reluctant to return to being housewives, as was the case elsewhere in the world. During this postwar state, Japan was in a hurry to gain economic strength to match the west and women were a vital part of the labor force. Though their roles were still limited, many favoring secretarial work as office ladies, women could work in retail, typically if their family owned stores, they could work as teachers, or in the manufacturing industry. In 1947, the Japanese Labor Standards Law gave working women special treatment, which restricted their ability to work overtime, dangerous jobs, and night jobs, but allowed leave during menstruation periods. Though harmful for women seeking equal footing with men in the job world, it protected the majority of early career women who intended to marry.

When the recession hit in the mid-70's, the government began to support women workers as a way to bolster the economy. This began the famous M-Curve, which was a graph of the working age of women. Before marriage and after their children were raised proved to be the times women sought out employment, with a dip in between the two for child rearing. This roughly formed an M when charted graphically and the M-curve became the primary reference for working ages of Japanese women to this day. Despite the apparent support of Japanese women's new found independence, part-time pay for Japanese women was only 61% of a man's wages, gradually worsening as the 70's drew on.

By the early 80's 45.8% of women aged fifteen and above were in the labor force, the women population of Japan comprising roughly 37.4% of the entire work force. During this time, unmarried women did not make up the majority of the Japanese work force. Women age 36 and above accounted for a much larger percentage. Women who were home bound during this period also used piecework at home as a way of supplementing the family's income. Though the pay for this was incredibly poor, accounting for only a bare bones 25,000 yen per month.

== Recent times ==
By the year 2000, 40.7% of the total Japanese work force were female workers, with 56.9% of those women being married, indicating the path of career woman was not just open to the single women of Japan. By the end of the 1990s, women were concentrated in light manufacturing work, such as food production, as well as tertiary industries, like retail business, restaurants, and financing companies. In Japan, the idea of a part-time worker is someone who works for a set period, with no bonuses or fringe benefits. Many employers used part-time women workers as supplementary labor with no chance of advancement and unstable job security.

Despite some legislation passed in 1985 to ensure equality, both the Equal Opportunity Law, which prohibits discrimination, and the Child-Care Leave Law, which gives parents unpaid leave to tend to children, then return to their old position or a similar one, lacked any real power to drive change. No penalties were issued for companies that ignored this, meaning, only women who take on the same burden as male employees, of working full-time, with no breaks for pregnancy or child rearing, are able to have any hope of advancement. Boards of directors, public servants, and judiciary branches of work are typically closed to any career woman not willing to work full-time and overtime regularly. The largest part of the labor force are not the full-time career women, but housewives who work part-time, supplementing the household budget. In fact, the government discourages housewives from making too much money, because if housewives make a certain amount, they lose their husband's dependent allowance.

This limits the jobs women can do while married. In many instances of the Japanese work force, women who wish to receive equal pay and chances at promotion are expected to act like their salaryman counterparts. This is indicative of one of the problems women face when seeking employment in Japan. While equal in part, they still face discrimination. Many businesses lack the flexibility to offer work which fits the irregular schedules of housewives. There have been some strides forward however. The equal employment legislation of the 1980s did prohibit discrimination in the training, benefits, retirement, and dismissal, however, not in recruitment, hiring, or promotion.

=== Lost Decades ===
Since 1991, Japan has undergone a protracted recession known popularly as the Lost Decades. After the real estate boom from 1986 to 1991, also known as the bubble economy, where a strong economy resulted in strong demand for and low unemployment, the Lost Decades resulted in drastic cutbacks among Japanese employers, causing a large increase in unemployment. Despite signs of recovery in the mid-2000s, the 2008 global economic recession has protracted these issues. Among this macroeconomic situation, large changes have been occurring within the Japanese economy that has changed the role of the working woman in Japan. Radical changes in government policies and focus has resulted in increased social care and the creation of dual-sector employment, which have affected female employment and the working housewife.

Challenges to the dominant male breadwinner model has led to changing social perspectives on the traditional role of the wife in providing familial care, although discrimination and stereotypes remain rampant. The creation of the double-track personnel management strategy in response to government affirmative action policies has contributed to the lack of women in management and gendered roles in the office.

=== Government policies ===
The Lost Decades forced a radical change in legislation as the government was now dealing with major declines in the economy and the competitiveness of Japan in the world markets. Neoliberal trade liberalization policies resulted in increasing competitive pressures on Japanese companies, forcing many to reduce labor costs. The 1998 and 2003 revision of the Labor Standard Law and the 1999 Worker Dispatching Law allowed for easier dismissal of workers and relaxed regulations regarding hiring practices, along with the aforementioned Equal Opportunity Law.

As part-time workers, commonly known as freeters, are far less expensive than the traditional full-time lifelong worker whose wages traditionally increased with age, Japanese companies drastically increased the proportion of part-time workers to full-time workers. Among young adult workers, the percentage of full-time employees dropped from 90% in 1988 to 54% for a single, high-school educated female. Females are more significantly affected by development, as males are still able to maintain a higher ratio of full-time employment. The full-time employment rate of high-school educated males was at 78% in 2008 as compared to 75% for university educated females. As part-time workers receive lower wages, less employment protection and little benefits, female workers experience marginalization.

=== Changing social perspectives ===
As decreases in job security and wages for males have negatively impacted the ability of the sole male-breadwinner family model, there is now increasing pressure for women to work outside the home in a dual-earner family model. The percentage of young women who believed that a man should work outside a home and that women should work inside dropped from 41.6% in 1997 to 27.8% in 2008, while for men the rate went from 40.7% to 34.3% respectively. Similarly, the proportion of young women who expected to work until retirement rose from 15.3% in 1987 to 24.7% in 2010, while the proportion of men who expected their wives to do so rose from 10.5% to 32.7% in the same time period. The increasing acceptance of young Japanese adults of the dual-earner model has resulted in an increase of dual-earner young households from 32.4% in 2000 to 42.8% in 2009.

Women are also delaying or avoiding marriage altogether. The mean age of first marriage rose from 24.2 in 1970 to 28.8 in 2010, while the proportion of women aged 25–29 who have not married increased from 18.1% in 1970 to 60.3% in 2010. The education levels of young women are also drastically increasing, at a rate higher than their male counterparts. 45.2% of women in 2010 progressed to university from high school, a dramatic increase from 15.2% in 1990. These changes in Japanese society have narrowed the wage gap between men and women, as wages of female 25–29 years old have reached 88% of their male counterparts in 2007, as opposed to 76% in 1981. However, a large part of this reduction in the wage gap is due to the stagnation of male wages, which was at the same levels in 2007 as in 1991.

=== Employment patterns ===
A key issue that remains is the lack of female representation in management. Of all legislators, senior officials and management, females are found in only 9% of the positions. This disparity has contributed to the larger overall gender wage gap of females earning only 66.5% of male earnings in 2002. Prevalent social opinions suggest that this disparity is due to the lack of commit of Japanese women to their jobs due to their perspectives regarding marriage, family, and children.

While the government had imposed the Equal Opportunity Law in 1986, companies responded by creating a 'double-track management system' (DPM), where a career track allows for promotions but requires transfers, and a non-career track that does not require transfers but has low chances of promotion. Previously, employers often maintained a core workforce mainly consisting of male employees which was expected to work at head office and be transferred around the world, and a peripheral workforce of female employees working at local branches with restricted career advancement.

Uptake by females of the career track is extremely low at less than 4% in all industries. Given the strong internal labor market of Japanese companies which stipulates that senior positions are only given to those in the career track and not from sources external to the company, this has contributed to the low proportion of female managers. This DPM system is also prevalent, especially among larger firms, with 51.2% of firms with more than 5,000 employees using the system.

Gendered divisions exist in the workplace and are replicated by both male and female workers. Although both genders may be allocated to the same section, males were often trained and allocated towards management jobs. As a result, female workers often were not in or chose not to be in management jobs due to lack of training, experience, and opportunity. In addition, more than half of surveyed companies indicated that they were attempting to eradicate instances of sexual harassment and discriminatory practices by males towards female workers, indicating an existing environment of a male-dominated workplace.

== "Women-friendly" ==
In the 21st century, though women still face some degrees of discrimination in the Japanese job market, there have been a number of companies that both foster women's equality and reward them on a talent based system. New fields, such as banking, journalism, insurance sales, and advertising; companies in the information industry, are very appealing to women, because they reward them based on individual ability. These companies are also keen to rotate workers out every two or three years, giving women the opportunity to explore a number of different departments without job hopping, fostering trust in the company and versatility in the women workers.

Aside from the information industry, several foreign companies have taken an interest in Japan. The companies provide Japanese women, who have some foreign language proficiency, work in challenging fields with pay comparable to their male counterparts. Women also have a better chance of promotion to managerial positions in foreign companies and are hired based on their skills, rather than potential abilities that can be mastered through on the job training, as is popular with Japanese firms. These alternatives may often lack the job security that can be found at large Japanese companies, but they reward women based on talent rather than seniority, provide better chances for promotion, and offer a greater challenge to working women.

== Stereotypes ==
Women have a mysterious power, despite not being used to their full capacity, due to their desire of marriage over lifetime employment. They do, however, often work as message carriers, or in secretarial positions that allow them to act as emotional propagandists for the company, hearing secrets of workers and internal affairs.

This stereotype was still prevalent, even in the 1980s. To many, women were only ephemeral creatures, working briefly before settling down for marriage, where their only real use was as window dressings or as a company's emotional propagandists. In a predominantly patriarchal society, women largely went unnoticed in the workforce, due to unfair stereotypes of their positions. Ethnographers also noticed this, stating that women have a great well of power, equal or greater to that of Japanese men, in terms of will, bravery, and psychological strength, despite being undervalued as members of the work force. Several stereotypes are prevalent in media and are often what Japanese working women are associated with.

=== Tea girls ===
Sometimes called ochakumi or tea fetchers, this job revolves around women who are specifically hired or requested to serve tea or coffee to their co-workers and executives, sometimes expected to arrive at the office early to tidy up, similarly to a housewife. This type of work was rooted in the early 1900s, when the office was a different place to work and women were expected to be supporters of men. This position is not only limited to women, however. Women in managerial positions can be served by lower ranked men in some cases.

=== Hostess ===
While comparable to geisha, these women make livings entertaining business men, often spending large amounts of their work time with them. Hostesses, however, can choose this path, rather than being sold into it, like a brothel girl from the Meiji era. This type of work borders on the sex industry, with women being paid to amuse men who eat and drink at night clubs, salons, taverns, etc. Though the hours are irregular, the pay is very good for women willing to work in this sector, some of whom even aspire to own their own private establishments. Due to the odd nature of this work, though, this type of employment is usually only sought by divorcees, young unmarried Japanese women, or married women in need of quick cash.

Hostesses will often play the part of a mother or housewife for male customers, caring for them, inflating their ego, and flirting with them, offering bits of flattery for tips. Depending on the size of the bar, night club, etc., there may be a large show to relax the customers; or in smaller establishments, the hostess will spend one-on-one time with her clients, gaining social ties while charging her clients for their attention. Though it can be a good source of quick money for women willing to work odd hours, normally single women with a low education, usually around the high school level, are the primary hostess candidates. They work late into the nights and sleep during the days, so these women are close to opposites of the salarymen they entertain. In the 21st century, this type of industry has drastically evolved. Pictures of kimono clad hostesses or hostesses willing to dress up in costumes for the amusement of customers have become an iconic image for tourists.

=== Office lady ===
Often nicknamed shokuba no hana or "office flower", these women suffered discrimination due to the M-Curve. Office ladies were usually hired right after high school or junior high, with university graduates discouraged from pursuing this type of career. They were kept around the office for the youth they brought to it, hence the "flower" nickname. They were charged with routine, menial tasks meant to support the male workers. This type of career offered very little chance of advancement and was specifically designed so that women would leave for marriage before their thirties. Women between the ages of twenty-four and twenty-eight would often be advised to settle down as a subtle message to quit, as those years were considered the most suitable for marriage.

== Hindrances to career women ==
=== Domestic entrapment ===
Japanese women will sometimes be forced to take jobs after marriage to supplement their husband's income; however, some women are unable to work, because of the lack of domestic support at home. Husbands seldom help with the housework, forcing women to stay home rearing children and taking care of domestic tasks. Many believe a good housewife's job is to stay at home and look after the house. Housewives may allow their husband to help in some small tasks; however, they are worried if they see their husband taking too much time to do domestic chores. Housewives believe the house is their charge and do not want their husbands accusing them of neglecting their responsibility.

Japanese women overall completed 95% of unpaid housework, while among full-time workers women still completed 60% of the housework, an unparalleled proportion among OECD countries. In 2000, 84.6% of women and 88.5% of men agreed that women should still be responsible for household jobs although it is good to have employment. In 2004, 67.4% of new mothers left their previous job for their first birth.

=== Sexual harassment ===
With a rise in feminism, more cases of sexual harassment are being reported from Japanese women in the workplace and on commutes to work. Two types of sexual harassment have gain widespread fame in the workplace and are being addressed. The first revolves around a woman being fired, or demoted due to a refusal to offer sexual favors to her superior. This is called retaliatory. The second revolves around an environment that is denigrating to female workers, including sexual comments, lewd pictures, or inappropriate actions by male co-workers in the workplace. This is called environmental. Despite these being addressed, due to ambiguities in the legal framework, these types of harassment can be hard to enforce. Women are bringing it to the public's attention through attempts to speak out against the injustice, however, many remain silent, fearing they will be fired if they speak out. This hurts their performance, undermining the idea of equality in the workplace.

Sexual harassment can be a double edged sword in the workplace. Some women reported that men who are caught sexually harassing female co-workers are laughing stocks. Based on the Japanese idea of shame, some men, especially in large corporations, avoid sexual harassment at all costs to preserve their position. Also, the opinions of men can vary greatly from department to department. Women harassed in one department can meet with no resistance after being transferred. Men's opinions of women in Japan vary greatly, primarily due to their experiences with women. Apart from their wives, mothers, and hostesses that salarymen spend time with, men live in separate spheres than women, so many are uneducated in the best ways to act.

=== Financial inequality ===
Despite improvements to health, education, and overall employment in 21st century postwar Japan, career women suffer from a large bit of gender inequality. Japan has the largest wage gap between men and women and the smallest proportion of female managers, females enrolled in higher education, and women who hold parliamentary seats among the other industrialized nations of the world. In terms of equal wages, Japan offers women even less than their male counterparts compared to its less developed neighbors. Women in China, Thailand, Malaysia, and Vietnam all make a higher percentage of wages than Japanese women. Japan lags far behind in terms of financial equality, despite other improvements over the years.

=== Divorce ===
Divorce rates have risen in Japan since the 1980s, the spread of feminism weakening the stigma that is often associated with divorce. Women in the workplace are now more capable of leading an independent life from their husbands and see divorce as an act of autonomy. Despite this, some women cannot financially afford divorce and there have been several attempts to suppress divorce rates over the years. Women without a steady income are unlikely to gain joint ownership of property and cannot acquire loans for a new home.

Women are also more likely to gain custody of the children, but have a difficult time getting the father to share in the costs of rearing them. Due to the family registration system, it is much harder for divorced women or men to remarry. In these cases, women may choose to avoid divorce for the sakes of their children, despite it being the better option. If a woman does not already have a steady income, divorce is seldom a viable option, despite younger women seeing it as the better option.

=== Seniority system ===
Following World War II, Japan was left with a shortage of skilled workers and a surplus of unskilled workers. To try to make the best of this situation, the seniority system was instituted in the Japanese workplace, which still persists today. The idea of a salaryman comes from this system. With the seniority system, workers were valued for lifetime contributions to their employers, who offered wage increases and promises of promotion depending on the number of years worked. Women were not seen as wise investments in this system, due largely in part to the M-curve which showed they primarily worked before marriage, then after their children were grown, taking a large span of time in between for child rearing. Women were relegated to part-time workers, or temporary workers who could be laid off during economic down turns.

Even with the seniority system, women were still vital to the work of many companies. In Tokyo, to attract more women, a semi-managerial track was adopted to work hand in hand with the seniority system. This track offered women a chance for advancement based on performance, rather than lifetime employment. Tests for promotion in this track could be grueling and the positions were limited due to the economic burden of paying a managerial salary. Many Japanese women had to come to terms with taking on heavier responsibilities as well, working late into the night, sometimes alone.

== People ==
=== Ichiko Ishihara ===
Ishihara Ichiko was the first Japanese woman to be appointed to an executive post; holding the position of executive director of Takashimaya department store. She was famous for her slogan, "Think like a man, act like a lady, and work like a dog." Ichiko managed to rise to the top of the department store industry by working extensive overtime hours, while reporting she had left at the designated quitting time, so the company would not have to pay her overtime. In this manner, she was able to prove her worth to the company without being an economic drain on them. She used her female perspective to boost sales in kitchenware departments; while initiating bold new ideas and change along the way.

Ichiko is one of the most prominent career women, working as hard, or harder, than the typical salaryman, while using her skills over seniority to advance. She was able to go far in the department store business because in the 1980s, it was realized that even if housewives didn't work, they were largely in charge of the family budget and marketing to them would be wiser than the "For men only" idea of business. Using a feminine perspective to appeal to female clients, while putting in the effort of working massive hours of unpaid overtime, Ichiko was able to prosper from her skill in a system based on seniority that frequently discriminated against women.

=== Toyoko Nakanishi ===
Owner and manager of the Shokado women's bookstore in Osaka, Toyoko has been a very outspoken feminist. Toyoko is the sole owner and only worker in the bookstore, but her store has become a hub of feminist activity. In the 1980s, Toyoko and another group of feminists took the time to translate the text "Our Bodies, Ourselves" into Japanese. She is a different breed of career woman, who is both active in the world of women's rights, but also manages to run a private business on her own, though she attributes much of her success to the feminists who frequent her store. She keeps Japanese feminist texts perpetually in stock for their convenience. To her knowledge, Toyoko's store is the only "women's" book store in Japan. Instead of working up the corporate ladder, Toyoko managed to strike a chord with the women of Japan and succeed as an entrepreneur.

=== Rumiko Takahashi ===
Rumiko Takahashi is among the wealthiest celebrity Japanese manga artists. She began creating manga in 1978, her greatest works finding their home in the Shōnen Sunday magazine, which remains one of the most popular distributors of manga in the country. Takahashi worked with clockwork regularity in getting her manga out, garnering numerous fans, several deals for overseas publications, and contracts for many of her most popular works to be made into anime, including Urusei Yatsura, Ranma ½, and Inuyasha. She worked as hard as many career women, however, instead of choosing to embark in the difficult and often discriminatory corporate world, Takahashi chose a different kind of work and to this day remains one of the wealthiest women in Japan.

== See also ==
- Gender inequality in Japan
- Gender Equality Bureau, Japan
- Women in Japan
- Feminism in Japan
