= Gender Equality Bureau =

Agency of the government of Japan

The Gender Equality Bureau (男女共同参画局, Danjo Kyōdō Sankakukyoku) was established in 2001 as a division of the Japanese Cabinet Office tasked with planning and coordinating the policies of the Japanese Government pertaining to gender equality. The Gender Equality Bureau conducts research on topics concerning issues of gender—compiling findings into an annual report called the "White Paper".

== History ==
In 1994, the Headquarters for the Promotion of Gender Equality was created within the Cabinet of Japan. With the 1999 implementation of the Basic Law for a Gender-Equal Society, both the Office for Gender Equality and the Council for Gender Equality were established by the Japanese Cabinet. During the governmental reforms effected January 6, 2001, the Gender Equality Bureau was established under the newly formulated Cabinet Office.

Coupled with the Gender Equality Council, the Bureau is tasked with devising and coordinating plans regarding issues of gender equality in addition to executing plans that fall outside of the jurisdiction of any other ministry. When first founded, the Gender Equality Bureau was composed of 50 people with an equal balance between male and female members.

== Reasons for creation ==
Formulated partially as a result from outside pressure by Japanese feminists, the creation of the Gender Equality Bureau was praised by the United Nations, which cited the need for systemic social changes in Japan. While Japanese women were guaranteed equality in the 1947 constitution, many argued that there was a large gap between the ideals of the law and reality. In 1979, 70% of Japanese citizens surveyed agreed with the statement "the husband should be the breadwinner, the wife should stay at home".

During the 1980s—a decade which saw Japan ratify the U.N. Convention on the Elimination of Discrimination against Women in 1985 and the proposal of Japan's first National Action Plan for combating gender inequality in 1987—one public opinion survey found that 71% of Japanese women favored separate roles for men and women. Women constituted 1.7% of government management in 1997, and 0.2% of corporate management in 1998. Facing increasing international pressure from bodies like the United Nations, Japan in the 1990s undertook a variety of efforts that culminated in the creation of the Gender Equality Bureau in 2001.

== Mission statement ==
The Gender Equality Bureau seeks to promote a "Gender-Equal Society", where the human rights of all men and women are equally respected, and both genders have equal opportunity. The Bureau states that this goal is predicated on the establishment of a social and policy framework that allows individuals to choose their lifestyle without the limitations of traditional gender views. Specifically, the Gender Equality Bureau singles out the notion that women are supposed to be homemakers and men the breadwinners, calling on all citizens of Japan to "rethink our prejudiced notions of gender-based roles, so that we may realize a society where men and women can participate together in politics, at the workplace and at home, and lead exciting and fulfilling lives".

== Measures towards gender-equality ==
=== Expansion of women's participation in policy and decision-making in all fields of society ===
The Gender Equality Bureau seeks to increase the amount of power in female hands through the promotion of "positive action", where legal means are used to amend gender disparities so that both men and women are given equal opportunity to partake in all aspects of society. The current goal the Bureau wishes to achieve is to increase the percentage of women in leadership positions to at least 30% by the year 2020 in a wide range of fields, such as academia and politics.

Proportion of women for each item	Subsection of each item	Currently	Target (Deadline)
Politics	Election candidates of members of the House of Representatives	16.7% (2009)	30% (2020)
National Government	Managers	2.2% (2009)	5% (2015)
Local Government	Local public employees for prefectural governments	21.3% (2008)	30% (2015)
Private Sector	Section manager or higher in private companies	6.5% (2009)	10% (2015)
Education and Research	University professors	16.7% (2009)	30% (2020)

=== Work–life balance for men and women ===
The Gender Equality Bureau defines a work–life balance as a society in which an individual is not limited by his/her gender in choosing a fulfilling occupation that will accommodate each stage of an individual's life. Japanese workers on average have a minimum of ten work days for vacation time per year and are given zero paid public holidays, numbers that are far below any other industrialized nation except the United States. In order to ensure that Japanese workers are free to lead a healthy and affluent life in a style of their choosing while also maintaining their economic independence, the Gender Equality Bureau in 2007 recommended a variety of policies for both the public and private sector in order to increase time-off for employees.

The Bureau has pushed private employers to offer flexible hours that can cater to a variety of lifestyles, such as offering child-care leave for men in order to promote the male's role in child-rearing. Government, per the Bureau's recommendation, is tasked with providing a policy structure that meets both male and female needs, hiring only companies that practice work–life balance for public contracts, and passing legislation that signifies the importance of both genders taking an active role in domestic work.

=== Stopping violence against women ===
Gender Equality Bureau flyer providing information about spousal abuse. Gender.go.jp

In recognition of the emphasis put on the cessation of violence against women by the United Nations, the Gender Equality Bureau has made many endeavors to eliminate the issue. In 2001, the Bureau formulated the Act on the Prevention of Spousal Violence and the Protection of Victims in an effort to curtail domestic abuse. The act strives to increase the resources available to victims of spousal abuse while also providing a legal framework for victims to petition for protection against their abusers. The Gender Equality Bureau also campaigns annually from November 12 through November 25 to raise social awareness of violence against women to coincide with the United Nations' International Day for the Elimination of Violence against Women, in part by providing preventive education materials aimed at youths.

=== International cooperation ===
The Gender Equality Bureau, in seeking to promote gender equality in Japan, has sought guidance from international bodies such as the United Nations, the Asia-Pacific Economic Cooperation, and the Association of Southeast Asian Nations. In 2010, Japan served as chair of APEC, and held the 15th Women Leaders Network meeting in Tokyo. Japan was also one of the initial executives of UN Women, which was formed in January 2011.

The Gender Equality Bureau also works with international non-governmental agencies, such as Polaris Project and ECPAT, to combat issues such as human trafficking and sexual abuse. Some observers have also noted how international studies on gender inequality, such as those conducted annually by the World Economic Forum, have acted as catalysts for movement on the gender equality front by the Japanese government.

== Publications ==
=== The White Paper ===
The White Paper is an annual report published by the Gender Equality Bureau that contains both research and policy suggestions for issues of gender inequality. The main object of study for each White Paper remains largely consistent with the measures for gender equality established by the 1999 Basic Laws for a Gender-equal Society, although each new report attempts to address obstacles to the accomplishment of these measures. The 2010 White Paper—the latest year available online—focused on the education of Japanese women, calling for their increased education of the variety of career opportunities available to them in an attempt to avoid the closing of the next generation of Japanese women's minds due to stereotyped perception of gender roles in society. The 2010 White Paper also pushes for combating the popular perception of gender equality being only concerned with women, stating that a gender-equal society would benefit both "the male worker and the housewife".

=== Other publications ===
==== "Stop the Violence" (2008) ====
The Gender Equality Bureau publishes a variety of research and pamphlets each year. In 2008, a pamphlet called "Stop the Violence" was published, containing information for victims of spousal abuse.

==== "Men and Women of Japan" (2011) ====
Since 1996, the Gender Equality Bureau published a pamphlet detailing the current status of men and women in contemporary Japan that is presently called Women and Men in Japan.

==== "Disaster Prevention and Reconstruction from the Perspective of Gender Equality" (2012) ====
In the wake of the Great East Japan earthquake on March 11, 2011, the Gender Equality Bureau published a pamphlet for aid-workers on how to properly respond to disasters areas from a gender standpoint.

== Criticisms ==
=== Representation of women in public and private sectors ===
Despite the Gender Equality Bureau's efforts to increase representation of women in the public and private sector, some point out that Japan continues to lag far behind other industrialized nations in gender equality. According to the World Economic Forum, in 2011 Japan was ranked 100th out of 135 countries with regards to "Economic Participation and Opportunity", and 80th out of 135 for educational attainment for women. For female political empowerment, Japan ranked 101st, with an equality score of 0.072, with 1.00 representing total equality. To explain this lack of traction, some point to Japan's manifestation of a "glass ceiling" that limits the advancement of women in the workplace, and a culture that sees women workers as subservient employees who are expected to quit once married. From 1998 to 2009, the percentage of female corporate directors increased from 0.2% to 1.4%, an improvement one Japanese female chairwoman called "pathetically low".

=== Work–life balance ===
Sociologist Yuko Kawanishi, in an interview, said that Japanese corporate culture has blocked the goal of a work–life balance: "The men became slaves to the company which became like a family. People got sucked into the system and women had to take care of the home, in a kind of division of labour". Others argue that the demanding hours expected of employees in general force women out of the workplace. In 2006—according to one study—almost half of all Japanese women resigned from their jobs once they became pregnant with their first child, and of these women, less than 30% would go on to continue full-time work after childbirth. Critics say that this gendered split of the workforce only perpetuates the notion that women are meant to be homemakers and men the breadwinners.

=== Violence against women ===
In response to a 2004 Trafficking in Persons Report by the U.S. State Department that put international pressure on Japan to increase actions against human trafficking, the Japanese Government in 2009 adopted the Action Plan to Combat Trafficking in Persons. This act provides the Japanese government with powers to apply criminal law to human traffickers, and allow government bodies like the Gender Equality Bureau to collaborate with foreign countries and NGOs to protect victims. The 2011 Trafficking in Persons Report states that the measures undertaken by the Japanese government are "modest, but overall inadequate" efforts to combat human trafficking.

=== International cooperation ===
Gender Equality Bureau poster against human trafficking. gender.go.jp

The United Nations has been critical of Japan's failure to annually report the country's progress on gender equality issues, and for being slow to implement policies recommended by the U.N. Committee on the Elimination of Discrimination against All Women. Additionally, international studies that focus on gender equality have shown little significant statistical progress for women in Japan.

Some sects of Japanese society have also been vocal about their opposition to some components of gender equality, in the past complaining that discussions of sexual discrimination are nothing more than an effort to apply foreign values to Japanese society. In attempting to explain similar criticisms manifest in other countries, some academics have argued that global structures of gender often butt heads with more culture-specific concepts, resulting in tension between the imposed and traditional gender and/or sexual norms.

According to one study, this tension in Japan is likely to lessen over successive generations, as holders of traditional views tend to belong to an older cohort of the population. Others argue that the tension between global and local concepts of gender will eventually resolve in the establishment of a third system that will be a unique conglomeration of traditional and global gender norms for a particular region.

=== Global gender gap ===
Japan's global ranking for female equality had risen four places from 105th in 2013 to 101st in 2015, before plummeting to an all-time low of 111th in 2016, according to the annual Global Gender Gap Report.

== See also ==
- Family policy in Japan
- Feminism in Japan
- Kyariaūman, career woman
- Overview of gender inequality in Japan
- Women in Japan
