= Women and the Economic Miracle =

1993 non-fiction book by Mary Brinton

Women and the Economic Miracle: Gender and Work in Postwar Japan is a non-fiction book by Mary Brinton, published by the University of California Press in 1993.

Brinton argues that women had supported male workers and directly provided adaptable labor, so in this sense they support the economy of Japan. Brinton also argues that Japanese practices will remain separate from those in Western countries.

James R. Lincoln of the University of California, Berkeley described the book as "In the revisionist tradition of Japan sociology begun by Robert Cole and Ronald Dore".

== Background ==
The author used surveys and the Census of Japan as sources. The survey asked participants about their work history and questions about gender discrimination. The survey was administered in 1984, and conducted in Kodaira, Sapporo, and Toyohashi. A total of 1,200 people were surveyed, including men and women.

== Contents ==
In the second chapter she compares and contrasts how the role of women in the Japanese economy versus the same in the economy of the United States. This chapter includes data used to analyze the differences and similarities.

The author explores what she calls the "human capital development system" in the third chapter.

The stratification between men and women by Japanese employers is covered in the fourth chapter. It discusses historical information such as the oyakata system.

The survey findings are in the fifth chapter. Adolf Ehrentraut of the University of Windsor stated that the findings "convincingly demonstrated and explicated" "the relationship between key institutional and individual variables".

Japanese census data is used in four of the chapters.

== Reception ==
Ehrentraut stated the book is "a valuable contribution" to its field.

Ingrid Getreuer-Kargl and Sepp Linhart of the University of Vienna argued that the book's academic thesis had merit to be analyzed. The reviewers argued that, in regards to the author's goal to change perceptions of Japanese women in the workforce, the book would ultimately be inconsequential in changing said perceptions since it would be unlikely that a journalist would read and analyze an academic volume such as this book.

Andrew Gordon of Duke University described the work as "empirically rich, theoretically driven". Gordon argued that in Brinton's analysis she "dismisses culture too blithely" and that her belief that the system will give women in Japan more employment avenues is "more hope than analysis."

Alice Lam of the University of Kent called the work "a highly thought-provoking book".

Lincoln praised the book for having "nuanced and credible ideas" with sufficient evidence supporting it. However, he argued that the content would already be known to people with a high degree of familiarity with Japan.
