= Japanese Woman =

1871 painting by Bertalan Székely

Japanese woman
- Japán nő (Hungarian)
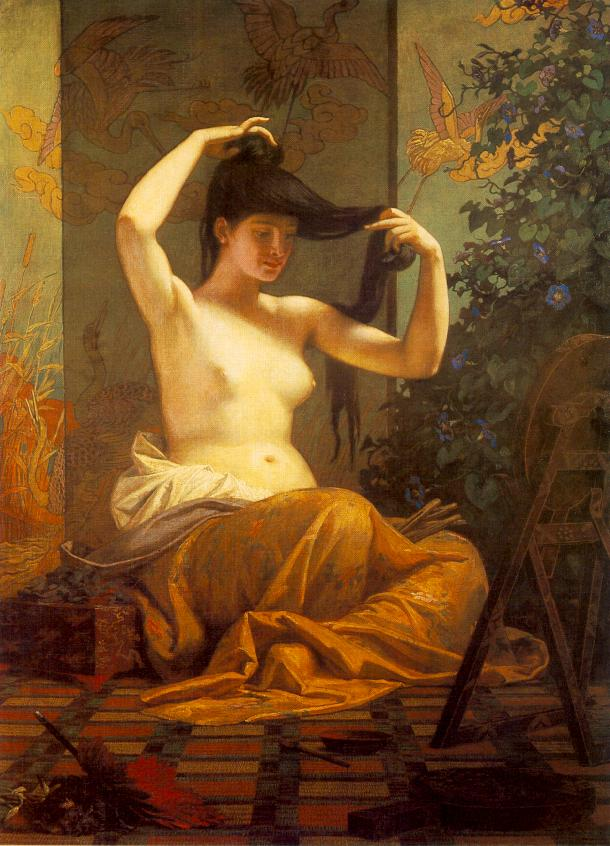
- Artist: Bertalan Székely
- Year: 1871
- Medium: oil on canvas
- Dimensions: 169.5 cm × 121.5 cm (66.7 in × 47.8 in)
- Location: Hungarian National Museum, Budapest

Japanese woman (Hungarian: Japán nő) is an 1871 painting by Hungarian artist Bertalan Székely.

== Description ==
Oil on canvas, it is 169.5 x 121.5cm and is in the collection of the Hungarian National Museum in Budapest.

== Analysis ==
Székely a significant artist in 19th century Kingdom of Hungary, also produced a remarkable work in this painting -- for the first time Hungarian art shows the impact of Japonism. Judging by her very prominent nose, the model does not seem to be Japanese, but other items in the work testify to Japanese culture and spirit and give information about them. Szekely encountered Japanese original works and objects during the East Asia exhibition at the Hungarian National Museum in 1870, and the exhibition inspired him to create this picture the following year.
