= Career woman =

Woman whose career is her main priority

A career woman is a term which describes a woman whose main goal in life is to create a career for herself. At the time that the term was first used in the 1930s American context, it was specifically used to differentiate between women who either worked in the home or worked outside the home in a low-level job as an economic necessity versus women who wanted to and were able to seek out jobs as careers. This meant jobs in professional or business occupations, with room for creativity, growth, and organizational expertise. Still women taking jobs without these attributes could still be considered 'career women' because of their goals, for example women who "wished to work not merely to support their families, but for a measure of personal economic independence, or as a byproduct of escaping from dull country life, or simply for the sociability of working with other women."

== In the United States ==
Pre-World War II, most American women worked in the home and those who worked outside the home were mainly young and unmarried, or widowed. The Census Bureau calculated that only 20 percent of women were earning a wage in the early 1900s and only 5 percent of those women were married. These numbers ignored the fact that many women's work in the home also included working in family businesses and producing goods for sale. They also ignore the differences in experience by women of different racial backgrounds. For example, "African American women were about twice as likely to participate in the labor force as were white women at the time."

By the 1930, women's participation in the labor market had increased to around 50 percent for single women and 12 percent for married women. These numbers reflect the slowly changing societal expectations and opportunities for women's work. This was partly the result of the first-wave feminism, where women came together to push for more rights for women, including the right to vote.

In the 1950s, "women with genuine career interest were described as both rare and maladjusted." While access to the option of being a 'career woman' continued to increase, the stigma remained. In the 50s and 60s though, an exception emerged. It was increasingly seen as appropriate for a married women to work if necessary to economically support the family or as long as her family and children came first. This 'new view' of career women was more acceptable because the traditional role of wife-mother remained the priority. If women demonstrated that their career came second, then it was tolerated if their career was also "a primary avenue of self-expression in the world world". Even as these changes slowly opened opportunities for women in the workplace, "the very term 'career woman' suggested pretentiousness or hard-boiled insensitivity and rejection of femininity."

Despite these various stigmas, women's participation in the workforce has continued to increase in terms of total numbers, while the nature of jobs available to women has also widened. By the early 1990s, around 74 percent of 'working-age' women (25–54 years old) were part of the labor force. Women's work in various fields had also diversified, going beyond "the traditional fields of teaching, nursing, social work, and clerical work" and into fields formally only occupied by men, such as doctors and lawyers.

=== Wage gap ===
There has been a long history of a gender pay gap, a phenomenon which continues to this day, where women with the same job titles and responsibilities as men receive less pay. The gap has narrowed over time, but in 2020 women still earned on average around 17 percent less than men and 10 percent less when comparing for nearly identical background and experience.

== In Japan ==
Kyariaūman is the Japanese term for a woman, married or not, who pursues a career to make a living and for personal advancement, rather than being a housewife without occupation outside the home. The term came into use when women were expected to marry and become housewives after a short period working as an "office lady." The term is used in Japan to describe the counterpart to the Japanese salaryman; a career woman in Japan also works for a salary, and seeks to supplement her family's income through work or to remain independent by seeking an independent career.

== Women in today's labour market ==
- Education
- Healthcare and caregiving
- Administrative and clerical roles
- Social and community services

== See also ==
- Glass ceiling
- Kyariaūman
- Gender equality
- Feminism
- Work–life balance
