= Mary Brinton =

American sociologist

Academic background
- Education: BA, Linguistics, 1975 Stanford University; MA, 1977, Japan Area Studies, MA, Sociology, 1980, PhD, Sociology, 1986, University of Washington
- Thesis: Women and the economic miracle: the maintenance of gender differences in education and employment in contemporary Japan (1986)

Academic work
- Institutions: Harvard University; Cornell University; University of Chicago

Mary C. Brinton is an American sociologist. She is the Director of the Edwin O. Reischauer Institute of Japanese Studies at Harvard University.

== Early life and education ==
Brinton completed her Bachelor of Arts degree in linguistics at Stanford University before enrolling at the University of Washington (UW) for her graduate degrees. At UW, she completed two Master's degrees in Japan Area Studies and Sociology before finishing her PhD.

== Career ==
Upon completing her PhD, Brinton became an associate professor in Sociology at the University of Chicago in 1986. In this role, she accepted an Abe Fellowship in 1994 from the Social Science Research Council for her research project The School-Work Transition: A Comparative Study of Three Industrial Societies. Following this fellowship, she co-edited a book entitled The new institutionalism in sociology and became a fellow at the Center for Advanced Study in the Behavioral Sciences at Stanford University from 1999 to 2000. Brinton then became a professor of sociology at Cornell University until 2002 when she joined Harvard University as their Reischauer Institute Professor of Sociology. As a professor at Harvard in 2006, Brinton accepted a Fulbright Scholarship to assist her project "Out of School, Out of Work? The Changing Youth Labor Market in Japan."

Following her Fulbright Scholarship, Brinton began focusing on low-birth-rate countries by interviewing young adults about their prospects and plans for parenthood. She collaborated with researchers in Spain, Japan, and Sweden to examine how attitudes towards childbirth measured across genders and how they have changed over time. During this time, Brinton published Lost in Transition: Youth, Work, and Instability in Postindustrial Japan through the Cambridge University Press in 2011 and was awarded the John Whitney Hall Book Prize from the Northeast Asian Council of the Association for Asian Studies. She subsequently accepted a Radcliffe College fellowship from 2013 to 2014 to continue her comparative project on fertility in postindustrial societies.

In July 2018, Brinton was appointed Director of the Edwin O. Reischauer Institute of Japanese Studies for a three-year term.

In 2022, she was conferred the Order of the Rising Sun, Gold Rays with Neck Ribbon by the Government of Japan, for her contributions to the field of Japanese Studies.

== Selected publications ==
The following is a list of selected publications:

- Women and the Economic Miracle: Gender and Work in Postwar Japan (1993)
- The New Institutionalism in Sociology (2001)
- Gender and Work (2007)
- Women’s Working Lives in East Asia (2010)
- Lost in Transition: Youth, Work, and Instability in Postindustrial Japan (2011)
- 縛られる日本人人口減少をもたらす「規範」を打ち破れるか
