= 2022 Ishikawa gubernatorial election =

- 13 March 2022
- Turnout: 61.82 ▲22.75
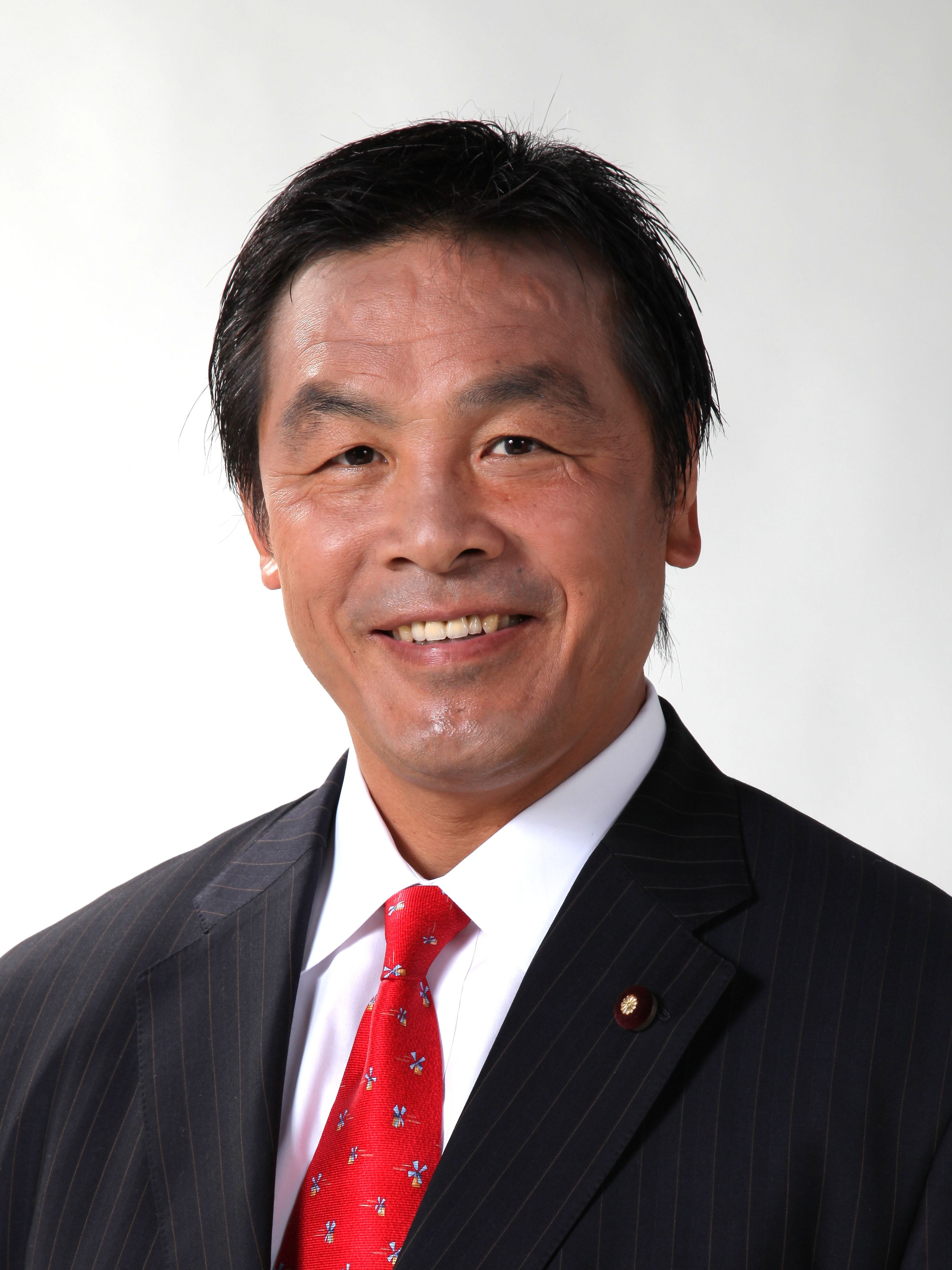

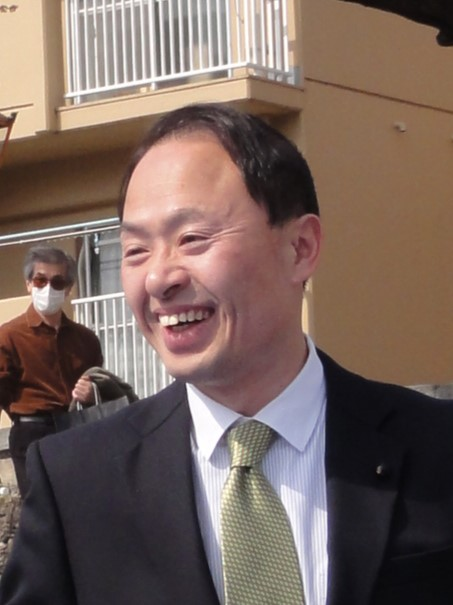

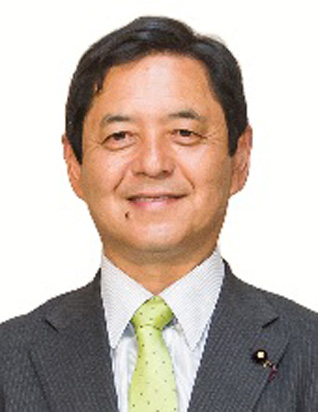
Candidate	Hiroshi Hase	Yukiyoshi Yamano	Shuji Yamada
Party	Independent	Independent	Independent
Popular vote	196,436	188,450	172,381
Percentage	34.13%	32.74%	29.95%
Supported by	LDP, Ishin		LDP, CDP, SDP
Governor before election
Masanori Tanimoto
Independent
Elected Governor
Hiroshi Hase
Independent

The 2022 Ishikawa gubernatorial election was held on 13 March 2022 to elect the next governor of Ishikawa (石川県, Ishikawa-ken), a prefecture of Japan located in the Chūbu region of Honshu island.

== Candidates ==
Masanori Tanimoto, 76, incumbent since 1994, is not seeking re-election. He supports Hiroshi Hase.

- Hiroshi Hase, 60, former high school teacher of Japanese, former Lower House member of the LDP, supported by Ishin.
- Yukiyoshi Yamano, a 59-year-old former mayor (LDP) of the Ishikawa prefectural capital of Kanazawa.
- Shuji Yamada, a 67-year-old former Upper House member of the LDP. He was backed by the Ishikawa prefectural branches of the CDP and the SDP, as well as the RENGO Ishikawa.
- Hiroko Iimori, 62, endorsed by JCP.
- Haruo Okano, 71, former company employee, fought in the election by stressing his commitment to solve environmental problems.

LDP’s prefectural chapter ended up backing both Hase and Yamada, and letting its members to vote as they like. Komeito, the LDP's junior coalition partner, also allowed its members to decide on their own how to vote.

== Results ==
Hase won the election, becoming only the third person elected to the governorship since 1963, after the decades-long tenures of Yōichi Nakanishi (1963-1994) and Masanori Tanimoto (1994-2022).

Ishikawa gubernatorial 2022
Party	Candidate	Votes	%	±%
Independent	Hiroshi Hase	196,436	34.13	n/a
Independent	Yukiyoshi Yamano	188,450	32.74	n/a
Independent	Shuji Yamada	172,381	29.95	n/a
Independent	Hiroko Iimori	15,331	2.66	▼17.40
Independent	Haruo Okano	3,011	0.52	n/a
Turnout		579.145	61,82	▲22.75
Registered electors		936,859		
Independent gain from Independent		Swing		
