= Yukiyoshi Yamano =

Japanese politician

- 山野 之義
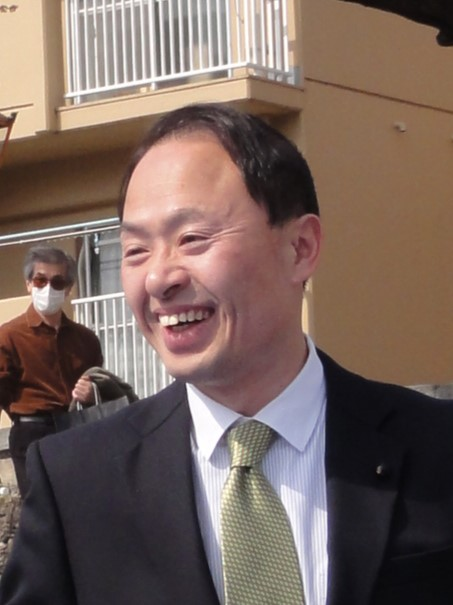
- Yamano in 2011

Governor of Ishikawa Prefecture
- Incumbent
- Assumed office 27 March 2026
- Monarch: Naruhito
- Preceded by: Hiroshi Hase

Mayor of Kanazawa
- In office 6 October 2014 – 16 February 2022
- Preceded by: Kunio Maruguchi (acting)
- Succeeded by: Takashi Murayama
- In office 10 December 2010 – 18 August 2014
- Preceded by: Tamotsu Yamade
- Succeeded by: Kunio Maruguchi (acting)

Member of the Kanazawa City Council
- In office 2 May 1995 – 9 November 2010

Personal details
- Born: 30 March 1962 (age 64) Kanazawa, Ishikawa, Japan
- Party: Independent
- Other political affiliations: LDP (until 2010)
- Education: Keio University
- Website: Yukiyoshi Yamano website

Yukiyoshi Yamano (山野 之義, Yamano Yukiyoshi; born 30 March 1962) is a Japanese politician, who serves as a governor of Ishikawa Prefecture.

== Early years ==
Yamano was born in 1962 in Kanazawa, Ishikawa Prefecture. In March 1987, he graduated from Keio University's Faculty of Literature, French Literature.

In April 1990, he joined SoftBank, where he worked until 31 August 1994.

== Political career ==
In 1995, Yamano ran for the Kanazawa City Council and was elected. As a member of the Kanazawa City Council, he belonged to LDP.

=== Mayor of Kanazawa ===
In 2010, Yamano left LDP and ran for the mayor of Kanazawa. LDP endorsed Yamano and he defeated Incumbent Tamotsu Yamade, endorsed by DPJ, PNP, Komeito and SDP.

On 18 August 2014, Yamano resigned as mayor after being criticized for promising convenience to certain companies over the opening of over-the-counter ticket offices. Yamano ran for mayor following his resignation and was re-elected after defeating LDP-endorsed candidate and DPJ-endorsed candidate by large margin. He was subsequently re-elected without a vote in the November 2014 mayoral election.

On 25 May 2015, at the Kanazawa City General Education Conference, Yamano mentioned the policy of adopting textbooks. "When the course of study was revised, there was a time when they said, 'Take care of the myth.' I hit my knee in spite of myself. Isn't it important to convey the myth of the nation to children as easily as possible?" "I have always been particular about the education of great men. I think it's okay to think about the policies that are easy to understand and focus on the characters." "Japanese is said to be the most beautiful in the five-seven-toned language. Previously, in a parliamentary question, he was asked about the Constitution. When considering the Constitution, I want them to discuss the beautiful Japanese language."

Regarding these remarks, Yukiko Yamamoto, a member of the Kanazawa City Council, asked Yamano at the Kanazawa City Council, "Do you think you have exceeded political neutrality as a mayor?"

On 1 September 2015, the Kanazawa City Board of Education announced that 24 junior high schools in Kanazawa had adopted Ikuho-sha's history textbook with mythical descriptions in it for four years from the following year. At the adoption meeting, two companies, Ikuho-sha and Teikoku-Shoin, were finally left, and the former was decided by a score of 4 to 3.

In the 2018 Kanazawa mayoral election, Yamano defeated JCP-endorsed candidate.

On 1 September 2020, the Kanazawa City Board of Education announced that it has continued to adopt Ikuho-sha's history textbooks to be used for four years from the following year at municipal junior high schools. It was an unusual decision amid a decrease in the number of local governments handling Ikuho-sha textbooks nationwide.

=== Governor of Ishikawa Prefecture ===
In 2022, Yamano resigned as a mayor and ran for governor of Ishikawa Prefecture. As a result of gubernatorial election, he lost to Hiroshi Hase by about 8,000 votes.

On 16 October 2025, Yamano announced his candidacy for the next gubernatorial election.

In the 2026 Ishikawa gubernatorial election, Yamano defeated Incumbent Hase and was elected to the governor of Ishikawa Prefecture for the first time.

== Scandal ==
=== Election campaign on Twitter ===
When he ran for mayor of Kanazawa in 2010, an official from Yamano's election team posted on Twitter calling for a vote on Yamano. Since campaigning on social media is prohibited by law, the Kanazawa City Election Commission warned the Yamano election team. Since it did not improve after that, the election committee asked Ishikawa Prefectural Police for their cooperation. However, the Ishikawa prefectural police did not file a case because it was difficult to identify the contributors and because of controversy over the lifting of the ban on election campaigns on social media. Subsequently, the revision of the law lifted the ban on election campaigns on SNS.
