= Family policy in Japan =

The percentage of births to unmarried women in selected countries, 1980 and 2007.

Family policy in the country of Japan refers to government measures that attempt to increase the national birthrate in order to address Japan's declining population. It is speculated that leading causes of Japan's declining birthrate include the institutional and social challenges Japanese women face when expected to care for children while simultaneously working the long hours expected of Japanese workers. Japanese family policy measures therefore seek to make childcare easier for new parents.

== History ==
=== Prewar policies ===
Japanese family policy in the early twentieth century was limited. Japanese industrialisation was originally localised in the textile production sector which relied heavily on the participation of women. This prompted female workers to campaign for the institution of childcare services for employees. In the 1890s, coal mines and spinning factories introduced daycare centers (kōjō takujisho) for their workers. These early daycare centers were directed towards low-income families and did not offer educational services. They were also primarily run privately by individuals or interest groups who were given government subsidies.

The Japanese government frequently introduced reforms during periods of rapid industrialisation and war, but slowed its efforts during times of peace. The Russo-Japanese War (1904-1905) caused the prevalence of daycare centers to increase to 2,200. These 2,200 centers decreased to 18 by 1912. The number of daycare centers also fluctuated in correlation with female participation in the workforce. As construction slowly replaced textiles and mining as the dominant industry, the workforce became more male-dominated and many daycare centers were closed.

The Factory Act of 1911 set minimum standards for health and safety by limiting the workday to twelve hours for women and children, as well as introducing a five-week maternity leave policy. Its revision in 1923 decreased the work day to eleven hours for women and children, added breaks for nursing women, and extended maternity leave by four weeks of prenatal leave and six weeks of postnatal leave.

The rice riots of 1917 and 1918 prompted an increase in social spending. By 1923, 65% of the Home Ministry's social projects budget was distributed to orphanages, clinics, and daycare centers.

=== Early postwar policies ===
Family policies became more progressive in the postwar era; several new policies were introduced by American officials during the U.S. occupation of Japan.

The Labor Standards Law (1947) attempted to alleviate gender discrimination by eliminating wage discrimination and ensuring equal treatment (byōdō taigū) by imposing penalties on offending employers. The law guaranteed women twelve weeks of paid (60% of their regular wage) maternity leave. This program is financed by the Japanese healthcare system. However, the law indirectly causes employers to hire less women as it bars women from working potentially hazardous or overnight jobs, and heavily limited the hours they were allowed to work overtime.

The 1947 Child Welfare Law introduced benefits such as provisions for daycare centers and mother-child housing to accommodate those widowed and orphaned during World War II. These benefits were originally provided only to those who demonstrated need, but the program was eventually extended to include all children. This expansion in coverage created problems as demand for services exceeded supply, ultimately causing issues between the Ministry of Education (which oversaw kindergartens) and the Ministry of Health and Welfare (which oversaw childcare more generally).

Revisions to the law in 1951 limited access to state-funded childcare to children who were “lacking care” (hoiku ni kakeru kodomo) and established a placement system (sochi seido) with varying fees calculated by the Ministry of Health and Welfare. Childcare centers managed by the state and non-profit groups conformed to the eight hours of care a day mandated by the Ministry of Health and Welfare, and could only accept children through the placement program. However, the eight hours of care a day provided frequently failed to meet the needs of parents with full-time jobs.

=== Late postwar era ===
Prior to the 1990s, the Japanese family policy was based on the assumption that men were the breadwinners of the family. The policy focused on achieving stable family structures which relied on the full-time employment of men. In response to economic difficulties and the declining fertility rate, changes to the policy become inevitable. The social policy has expanded to address care responsibility, child benefits, the well being of families with children, and childcare. In recent years, major concerns about the fertility rate and childcare services has arisen from the Japanese public and government. There have been successive reforms to the child benefit system based on these concerns. Japan's state-sponsored child benefit programs are not necessarily intended to reduce childhood poverty, rather the child benefit system is mainly focused on increasing the national fertility rate and economic development.

=== Child Benefit Act ===
The Child Benefit Act was implemented in 1972. At first, it was an income-tested benefit targeted to lower income groups in Japan. The Child Benefit Act began with 3000 yen as a contribution from local authorities.

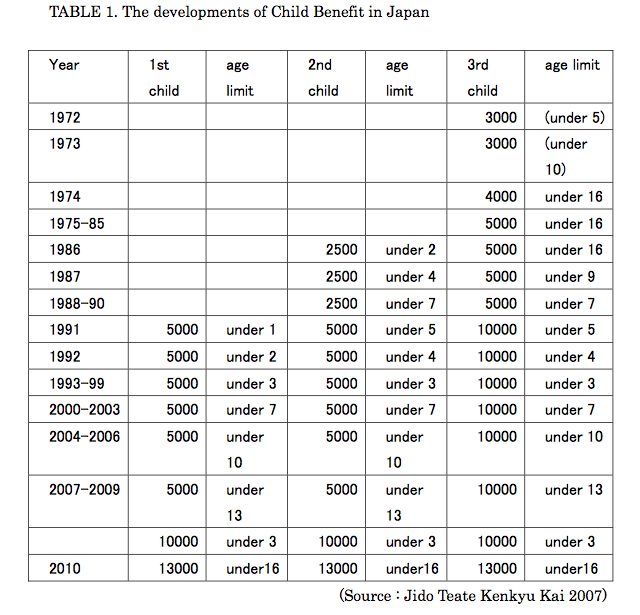
The contribution from local authorities for the Child Benefit from 1972 to 2010.

Government reconsidered its aim and based on an ideology of self-reliance and strong family ties during the oil crisis in the middle of 1970s, they started to target the children who most needed the benefit by increasing the amount of reward money.

The Child Benefit Act has two policy goals. The first goal is to provide financial security for children, and the second goal is to support the well-being and development of children.

Before 1990, the benefits were only paid to the family of the children until they turned 3 years old. There was a payment of 5,000 yen for the first and second child in the family ($50 a month for the 1st child). Since the eligibility benchmark has been raised, there has also been an increase of the amount of money paid in benefit. Since 2005, only the average earning family can claim this benefit. Families are paid up to $2,448.98 for giving birth to a child since the enactment of the act. In addition, some Japanese employers offer bonuses to their employees for having babies.

=== Gender-based division of labor ===
Labour force participation rate (15-64 age) in Japan, by sex

In Japan, caring for young and old people has traditionally been the responsibility of the family. This norm has caused work-family conflict due to its labor division. When raising a child people need access to workers’ income and benefits. Japanese Family Policy has changed its policy in response to the increasing number of working women and the low fertility rate and the work family-conflict. The policy tries to release working mothers from the anxiety and stress of child rearing and encourage childbearing by offering maternity leave, part-time jobs, and being able to work at home.

Family policies in Japan are seen to contribute to reaching equality through gender labor and societal roles. Parental and childcare policies are meant to provide higher income but result in increase in mother-service at work and lower home involvement with children. The issue that continues the lack in female employment derives from grandparental care and low fertility rates. For the “womenomics” in Japan, the participation rate of labor force has reached its highest point in 2014 than last fifteen years. It is 66.0% according to OECD. “Womenomics is the promotion of economic empowerment for women”. Work contracts encounter restrictions due to length of stay and the child reaching age one. Take-up rate is affected when parental leave policies are not taken advantage of since it lowers economic standing and reduces job continuity.

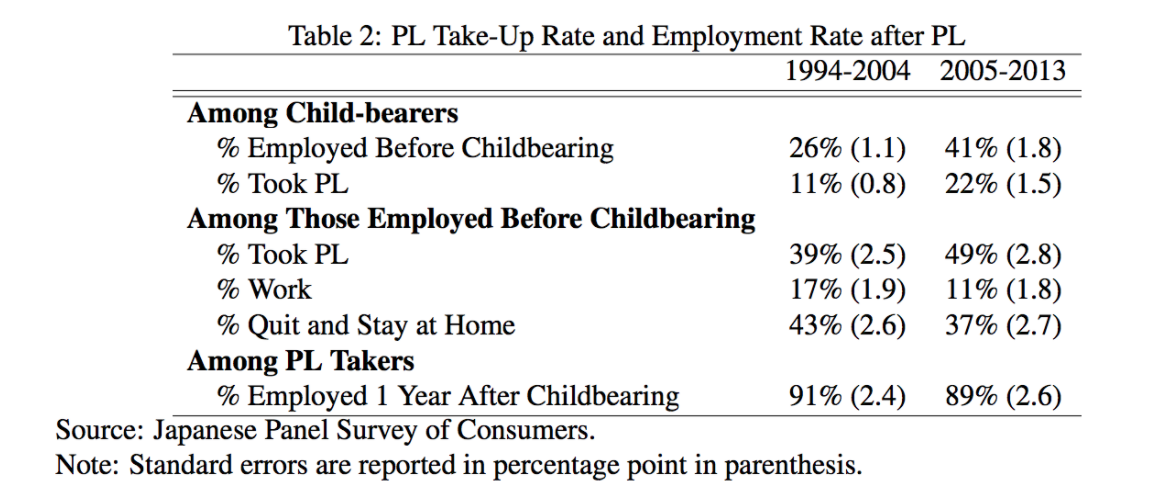
Parental Leave take-up rate and employment rate after parental leave from 1994 to 2013

Post-war labor concerns with the distribution of power amongst father and mother. “[Men form the core of the labor force and women provide social care that takes place at the family and societal levels]”. Gender segregation longitudinal studies have covered the interconnection between family, work, and reproduction repercussions. “Fathering Japan is an organization that provides seminars and events to private citizens, groups and corporations, functions as the contact point for an active community of fathers, and produces material on participatory fatherhood”.

Maternal assistance varies with tradition, religion, and women's preference. Friendly policies are meant to promote a work-life balance and provide parental satisfaction to accomplish stronger family ties. Women's spousal economic dependency on men has decreased due to the change in housewife expectations. Japan aims to put more women into the labor force as a strategy to increase the output of Japan's economic growth and improvement in women's income too.

Parental Leave/ Child Care Leave Law (1992)

In November 2001, this law was partially revised to prohibit business owners from firing, laying off, or downgrading their employees who have applied for this child care leave.

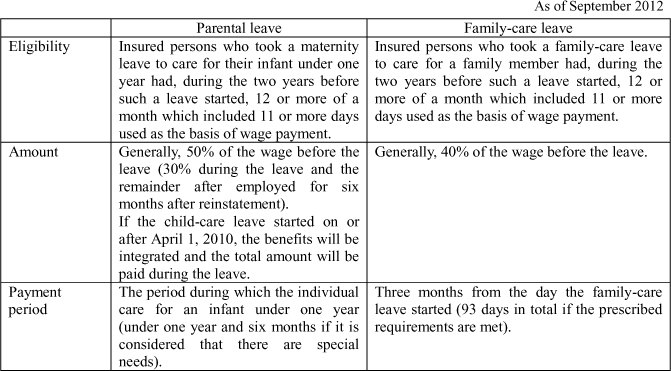
The continued employment benefits as of September 2012

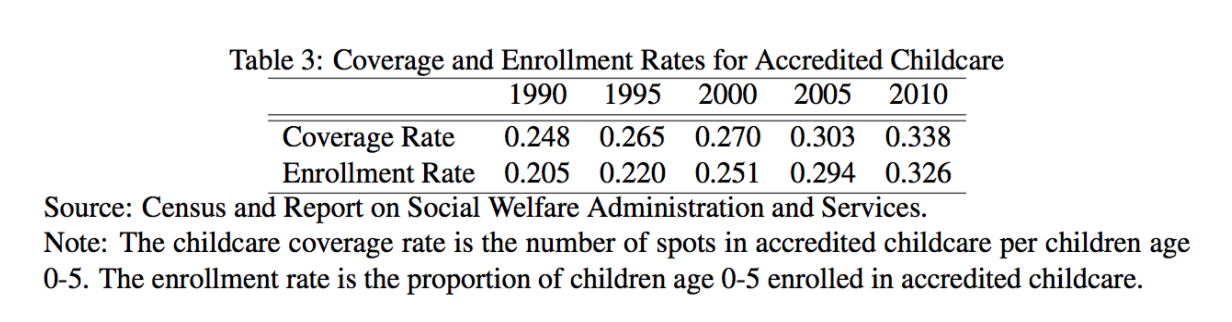
Coverage and Enrollment Rates for Accredited Childcare from 1990 to 2010

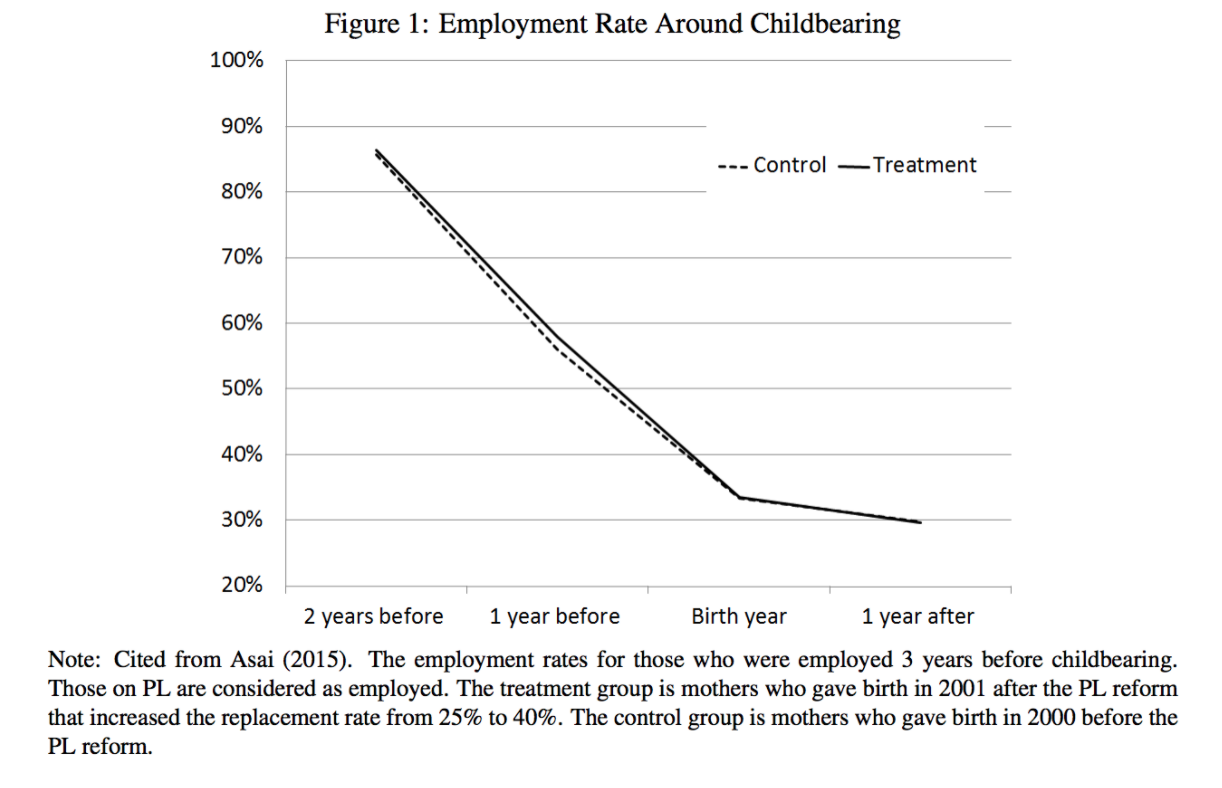
Employment Rate around Childbearing

Childcare policies contain restrictions for children under six years old (coverage) and institutional credibility (accredited and non-accredited). “Accredited childcare centers must satisfy the criteria for capacity, area, the number of teachers per pupil, etc.”. Subsidized childcare produce crowd funding with informal grandparental care, especially in a nuclear family oriented with the mother employed. Women's facilitation in the workforce is present but has not accommodated the difficulty of reduction in marriage, childbirth, and low capital.

When associated with choices between home-work responsibilities, a mother's leisure and productivity of “human capital” is in jeopardy since it falls with the aging of a child. “In response to concerns about the falling fertility rate, the Ministry of Health and Welfare launched an emergency five-year plan in 1994 to improve daycare services, which was broadened in 1995 to a ten year plan pursued in conjunction with the Labour, Construction, and Education Ministries and named the [‘Angel Plan’]”. The subsidies offer ‘administrative guidance’ in the span of 1-year leave to withhold job protection according to childbirth situation.

== See also ==
- Aging of Japan
- Demography of Japan
- Family law in Japan
- Japanese family
- Premium Passport
