= 2026 Ishikawa gubernatorial election =

- 8 March 2026
- Turnout: 54.68 （▼7.14）
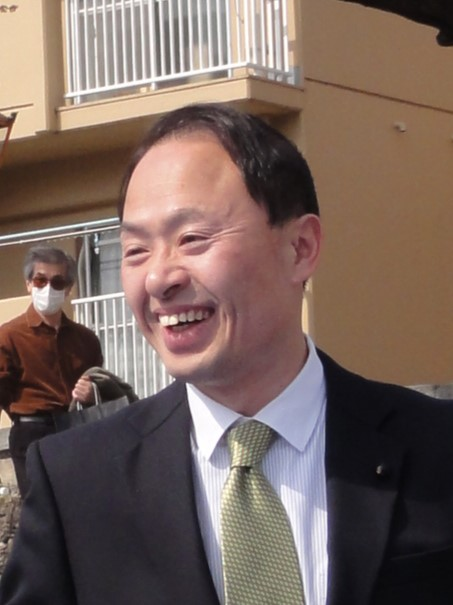

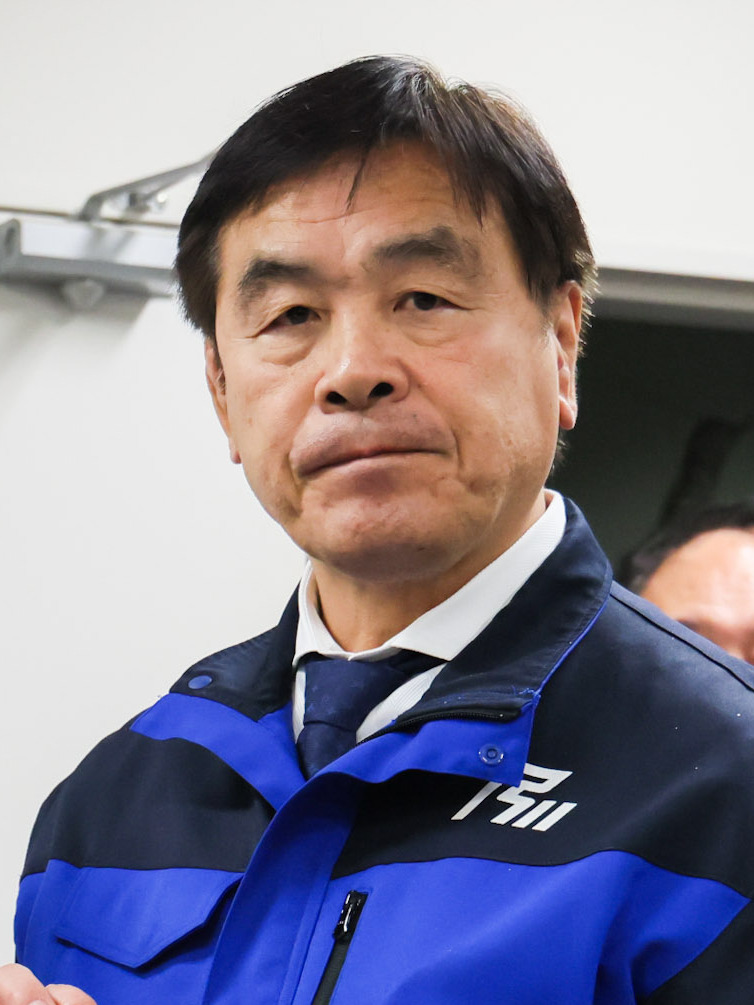
Candidate	Yukiyoshi Yamano	Hiroshi Hase
Party	Independent	Independent
Popular vote	245,674	239,564
Percentage	49.65%	48.42%
Supported by	DPP	LDP, Ishin
Governor before election
Hiroshi Hase
Independent
Elected Governor
Yukiyoshi Yamano
Independent

The 2026 Ishikawa gubernatorial election was held on 8 March 2026 to elect the next governor of Ishikawa (石川県, Ishikawa-ken), a prefecture of Japan located in the Chūbu region of Honshu island.

== Timeline ==
=== 2025 ===
- On 11 September 2025, Incumbent governor Hiroshi Hase announced his candidacy for the governor.
- On 16 October 2025, Yukiyoshi Yamano, former mayor of Kanazawa, announced his candidacy for the governor.

=== 2026 ===
- On 19 January 2026, Akira Kuroume announced his candidacy for the governor.

== Candidates ==
A total of 3 candidates registered candidacies for the election.

Name	Age	Party	Title
Yukiyoshi Yamano （山野之義）	63	Independent (Note: supported by DPP Ishikawa Prefecture federation.)	Former Mayor of Kanazawa; Former member of the Kanazawa City Council
Hiroshi Hase （馳浩）	64	Independent (Note: endorsed by LDP, Ishin.)	Incumbent Governor of Ishikawa Prefecture; Former member of the House of Representatives
Akira Kuroume （黒梅明）	78	Independent (Note: endorsed by JCP.)	Former Social worker

== Party's reaction ==
- LDP, Ishin endorsed Incumbent Hase. CDP and SDP Ishikawa Prefecture federation did not announce endorsement officially but supported Hase. PM Sanae Takaichi came to Kanazawa to attend the rally of Hase.
- DPP Ishikawa Prefecture federation supported Yamano officially.
- JCP endorsed Kuroume.
- Komeito and Sanseito did not endorse any candidates and decided to vote independently. However, a part of Komeito supported Hase. In Sanseito, Yuichiro Kawa, a member of the House of Representatives, supported Yamano, but Hirobumi Araki, a member of the Ishikawa Prfectural Assembly and former secretary to Hase, supported Hase.

== Results ==
Percentage of each candidate votes
1. Yukiyoshi Yamano (49.6%)
2. Hiroshi Hase (48.4%)
3. Akira Kuroume (1.93%)

Yamano defeated Incumbent Hase after a close race.

Ishikawa gubernatorial 2026
Party	Candidate	Votes	%	±%
Independent	Yukiyoshi Yamano	245,674	49.65	
Independent	Hiroshi Hase	239,564	48.42	
Independent	Akira Kuroume	9,540	1.93	n/a
Turnout		494,778	54.68	▼7.14
Registered electors		909,547		
Independent gain from Independent		Swing		

Results by Municipality
Municipalities	Yukiyoshi Yamano		Hiroshi Hase		Akira Kuroume	
Municipalities	Votes	%	Votes	%	Votes	%
Total	245,674	49.65%	239,564	48.42%	9,540	1.93%
Kanazawa	109,854	57.80%	75,876	39.92%	4,319	2.27%
Nanao	8,400	38.78%	12,983	59.94%	278	1.28%
Komatsu	18,849	41.80%	25,395	56.31%	851	1.89%
Wajima	3,722	34.17%	6,951	63.82%	219	2.01%
Suzu	2,184	33.26%	4,303	65.53%	79	1.20%
Kaga	12,083	45.28%	14,028	52.57%	572	2.14%
Hakui	4,758	44.23%	5,823	54.14%	175	1.63%
Kahoku	7,803	45.52%	9,130	53.26%	209	1.22%
Hakusan	26,345	50.95%	24,395	47.18%	965	1.87%
Nomi	10,806	45.63%	12,346	52.14%	529	2.23%
Nonoichi	11,105	52.83%	9,528	45.32%	389	1.85%
Kawakita	1,653	45.66%	1,904	52.60%	63	1.74%
Tsubata	8,019	46.66%	8,941	52.02%	227	1.32%
Uchinada	5,477	46.61%	6,054	51.52%	220	1.87%
Shika	3,511	35.80%	6,204	63.25%	93	0.95%
Hōdatsushimizu	2,927	45.37%	3,446	53.41%	79	1.22%
Nakanoto	3,644	43.88%	4,550	54.79%	110	1.33%
Anamizu	1,539	37.90%	2,474	60.94%	47	1.16%
Noto	2,995	35.89%	5,233	62.72%	116	1.39%
