= Japan Tent =

International exchange event in Japan

Japan Tent is an international exchange event held in Ishikawa Prefecture, Japan, every August. 300 foreign students studying in Japan are invited to Ishikawa for a homestay program there.

== History ==
The first Japan Tent event was held in 1988. By 2012, over 8,400 foreign students from 160 countries and regions have participated. In 2012, 300 people from 70 countries and regions participated, selected from approximately 1,000 applicants.

== Typical schedule ==
- Day 1 (Thursday): Arrive in Kanazawa, the capital of Ishikawa Prefecture for orientation and welcome ceremony before moving to countryside of Ishikawa. Homestay for three nights.
- Day 2-3 (Fri & Sat): International exchange programs in individual towns.
- Day 4 (Sunday): Back to Kanazawa. Meet another host family. Homestay for three more nights around Kanazawa.
- Day 5-6 (Mon & Tue): International exchange program in Kanazawa.
- Day 7 (Wednesday): Farewell ceremony.

== Typical activities ==
- Japanese tea ceremony
- Cooking Japanese cuisine
- Wagashi (Japanese confectionery) making
- Zazen experience
- Visiting miso and soy sauce factory
- Tasting and comparing sake
