= Kaga dialect =

Japanese Hokuriku dialect

- 加賀弁・加賀方言
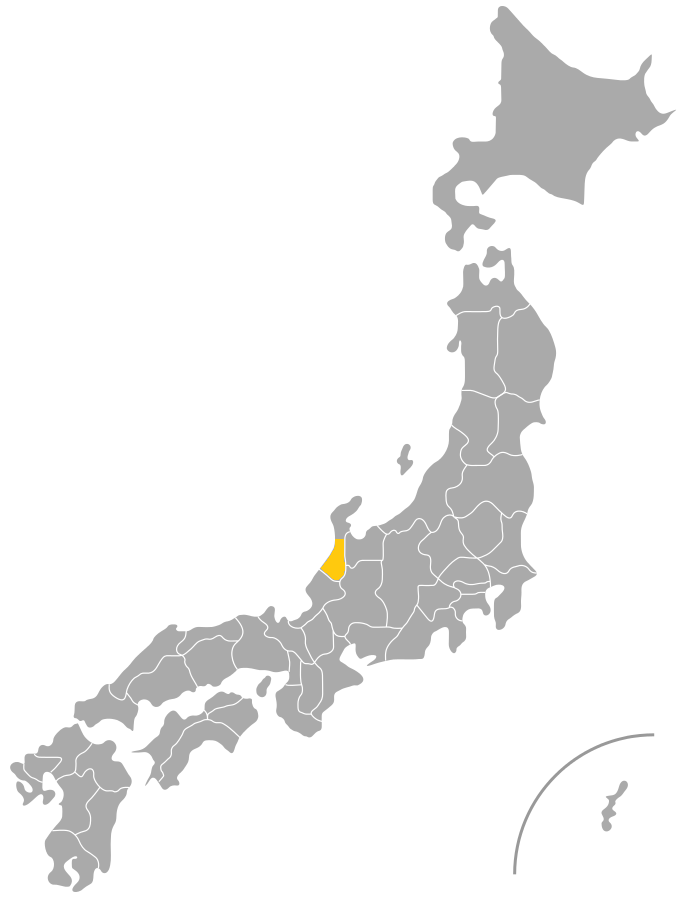
- Kaga dialect area
- Native to: Japan
- Region: Kaga, Ishikawa
- Language family: Japonic: Japanese; Western; Hokuriku; Kaga dialect
- Dialects: ◇ Komatsu (Central); ◇ Daishōji (South); ◇ Kanazawa (North)*

Language codes
- ISO 639-3: –

The Kaga dialect (Japanese: 加賀弁 kaga ben) is a dialect of Japanese spoken in the southern half of Ishikawa Prefecture in central Japan.

== Regional variation ==
The Kaga dialect is broadly divided into three regional dialects, which include:

1. The North Kaga dialect, centred around Kanazawa. Also known as the Kanazawa dialect and sometimes treated separately to the wider Kaga dialect. It may also be known as Kanazawa kotoba (金沢言葉 Literally 'Kanazawa language'), but this term in particular refers predominantly to the phrases used in customer service that have developed in the hanamachi district of its old town.
2. The Central Kaga (or Komatsu) dialect centred around Komatsu. Includes the vernacular of the former village of Shiramine, Hakusan, known as the Shiramine, or Jige dialect. The Shiramine dialect is a language island that differs considerably from other Kaga dialects.
3. The South Kaga (or Daishōji) dialect centred around Kaga City.

== Phonology ==
=== General features ===
- Single-mora nouns become lengthened, like me (目 eye) → mē (めぇ) and te (手 hand) → tē (てぇ).
  - In areas such as Komatsu, two-mora first-class nouns are lengthened. For example: hashi (橋 bridge) → hāshi (はあし), ashi (足 foot) → āshi (あぁし).
- In Shiramine, a /tu/ sound can be heard.
- Except when beginning a word, g-starting mora become nasalised.
- At the end of words or in breaks in conversation, an ‘undulating’ intonation (indicated by bold (rising) and underline (falling)) appears. It is a characteristic phenomena of Hokuriku dialects, and is known as kantō (間投 "interjection", not to be confused with the Kantō region) or yusuri ("shaking") intonation. Even among the younger generation, whose Japanese is increasingly standardised, this intonation is common. Below are some examples:
  - sore de (それで and then) → honde (ほんで) → hondeee (ほんでぇえ)
  - ~da kedo (〜だけど but) → ~ya kedo ( 〜やけど but) → yakedooo (やけどぉお) .
  - ano ne (あのね hey, so...) → anoon-nē (あのぉんねぇ)
  - etto ne (えっとね (filler word used to indicate one is thinking)) → ettoon-nē (えっとぉんねぇ).
- The demonstrative stem so- (そ-) sometimes becomes ho- (ほ-).
  - Sō da (そうだ that’s right ) → sō ya (そーや) ・ hō ya (ほーや).
  - Soshite (そして and ) → hoshite (ほして), etc.
- Among the older generation, there remains a distinction between ka (か) and kwa (くゎ), such as between kaji (家事 household task) and kwaji (火事 fire).

=== Pitch accent ===
According to Haruhiko Kindaichi, the pitch accent of Kaga dialects is considered to be intermediate between the Kyoto and Tokyo standards. Two-mora nouns like ka-ze (風 wind) are pronounced flat in both the Tokyo and Kyoto standards, but have a characteristic so-called kakō (下降) standard tone in Shiramine. When independent of any particles, the first mora is pronounced somewhat higher and the second mora falls slightly (indicated by 〇〇 in the table below). When a particle is attached, the second mora is higher and gently falls from the third mora onwards. Second- and third-class two-mora nouns like ya-ma (山 mountain) are front-mora stressed and fourth- and fifth-class two-mora nouns like ka-sa (笠 conical hat) are unaccented. In plain area, however, pitch accent changes depending on the type of vowel used. For example, in Daishoji, Kaga City, among first-, second- and third-class two-mora nouns, those with a close vowel (i, u) as their second mora are front-mora stressed and those with an open vowel (a, e, o) are final-mora stressed. Conversely, among those born in Showa Era Kanazawa, first-, second- and third-class two-mora nouns with a voiced consonant and close vowel (e.g. i-nu 犬 dog) as their second mora are front-mora stressed and those with a consonant and open vowel (e.g. i-ke 池 pond) as their second mora are final-mora stressed. Among the generation born between (mainly) the Meiji Era and the mid-Taisho era, however, first-class nouns are all final-mora stressed, differentiating them from second- and third-class nouns. In Kanazawa, fourth- and fifth-class nouns are unaccented. This pitch accent system is also found in the former town of Imajō in Fukui Prefecture.

Two-mora noun pitch accent in Kaga dialects
	Word	Shiramine	Daishōji	Kanazawa (old)	Kanazawa (new)
First class nouns	mizu (水 water)	〇〇	〇〇	〇〇	〇〇
First class nouns	taki (滝 waterfall)	〇〇	〇〇	〇〇	〇〇
First class nouns	kaze (風 wind)	〇〇	〇〇	〇〇	〇〇
Second and third class nouns	inu (犬 dog)	〇〇	〇〇	〇〇	〇〇
Second and third class nouns	yuki (雪 snow)	〇〇	〇〇	〇〇	〇〇
Second and third class nouns	yama (山 mountain)	〇〇	〇〇	〇〇	〇〇
Fourth and fifth class nouns	ame (雨 rain)	〇〇	〇〇	〇〇	〇〇

== Expressions and grammar ==
=== Kanazawa dialect ===
- Men often attach ya (や) and women ne (ね) to the end of words.
- The casual interrogative no (の) becomes ga (が), a trait found throughout Ishikawa and Niigata and is also shared with the Tosa dialect. For example:
  - sonna no ga ii no ka? (そんなのがいいのか is that really okay?) → honna ga ga ii ga ke? (ほんなががいいがけ).

==== ~masshi (〜まっし) ====
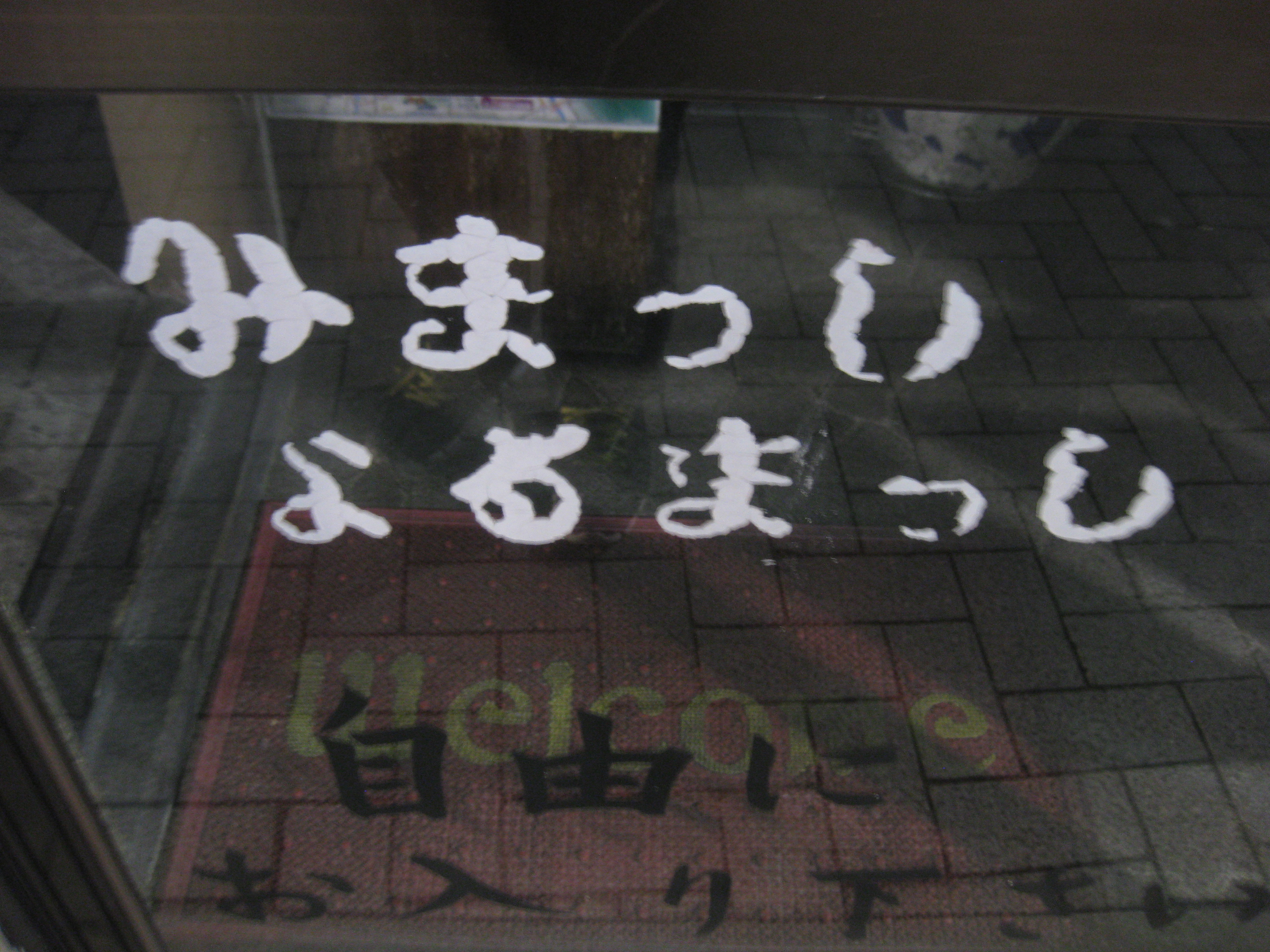
Shop with a sign reading 'mimasshi yorumasshi' (みまっし よるまっし 'please look, please look in')

The soft imperative -masshi (〜まっし) can be used in place of -nasai (〜なさい do ~ ). This is considered an iconic Kanazawa dialect expression. It is a euphonically-changed form of the respect particle -masaru (まさる)'s imperative form, -masare (まされ). Although -masaru is now only heard among the older generation, -masshi continues to be comparatively well used even among the younger generation due to possessing a specific degree of 'softness' not found in other imperative forms in standard Japanese. Save for to the attributive form, -masshi formerly connected directly onto the dictionary form of Godan verbs (Example: ganbaru-masshi (頑張るまっし do your best)). After World War II, however, this was influenced by the way -nasai connected to the -masu stem in standard Japanese, so that -masshi also came to connect to Godan verbs in the style of [-masu stem + masshi] (Example: ganbari-masshi (頑張りまっし)). Due to this generational change, some older speakers consider expressions like ganbari-masshi to be improper. The ending of -masshi can sometime change like in -masshi (i) ne (しまっし（い）ね) or -masshima (しまっしま), with the latter having a stronger nuance.

==== Informal imperatives ====
-ne (〜ね), -nema (〜ねま), -(stem form), -ima (〜いま) and -iya (〜 いや) are used in informal imperative expressions. For example:

- okinasai (起きなさい wake up) → okimasshi (起きまっし), okine (起きね), okinema (起きねま), oki (起き), okiima (起きーま) or okiiya (起きーや).

In the case of ~shine, this means that the second portion of the dialectal equivalent of hayaku shinasai (早くしなさいね hurry up and do it), hayo shine (はよしね), becomes a homophone with the second part of the vulgar hayaku shine (早く死ね literally: 'hurry up and die' ). In reality, however, the shine sound is avoided and hayo senkai ne (はよせんかいね) is more commonly said.

==== Ga yo (がや) and ga ne (がね) ====
Equivalent to da yo (だよ) and no da (のだ), respectively. Among those middle-aged and younger, the informal gan'ya (がんや), gan (がん) and gē (げー) are also spoken, with a further derivative of gē, gen (げん), being widely used among predominantly the younger generation. Gen is also widely used outside of Kanazawa in areas such as Komatsu. Gan and gen sometimes merge with the sound preceding them. For example:

- Suru-gan (するがん I’m going to do it) → suran (すらん), suru-gen (するげん also I’m going to do it) → suren (すれん).
- Iku-gan (行くがん I’m going to go) → ikan (行かん), iku-gen (行くげん also I’m going to go) → iken (行けん).
- Tabeta-gen (食べたげん I ate it (explanatory)) → tabeten (食べてん)
- Suki-na-gen (好きなげん I like it (explanatory)) → suki-nen (好きねん), etc.

==== Jii (じー) and Wē (うぇー) ====
Kanazawa-unique sentence-ending particles that express emphasis. Jii expresses feelings of unexpectedness or surprise, whilst wē expresses feelings of pride. Although jii is still used among young people, wē's slightly negative nuance has led to its decline. Jii is considered to be a modified form of ze (ぜ) whilst wē is thought to be a corruption of wai (わい) or e (え). For example:

- ii nekutai shiteru nē (いいネクタイしてるねえ you’ve got a nice tie ) → ii nekutai shitoru jii (いいネクタイしとるじー).
- ii nekutai shiteru desho (いいネクタイしてるでしょ my tie’s nice, right?) → ii nekutai shitoru wē (いいネクタイしとるうぇー).

==== Ke (け) ====
Interrogative sentence-ending particle equivalent to kai (かい) in standard Japanese. Compared to ka (か), it displays greater intimacy and kindness, and is widely used by both sexes. Ke often experiences sokuon like in shitokke (しとっけ) (= -shite iru kai? (~しているかい？ are you doing ~ ?) and shite kurekke? (してくれっけ？) (= ~shite kureru kai? (〜してくれるかい？ can you help me do ~?). In parts of the Kinki Region such as Kyoto and Osaka, ke is regarded as a rude, masculine expression, which can lead to misunderstandings between people from Kanazawa and these areas during conversation.

==== Asobase (あそばせ) ====
When interacting with customers in hanamachi districts, so-called ‘asobase language' like in o-agari-asobase (お上がりあそばせ please come in )) or irashite-oide-asobase (いらしておいであそばせ) is widely used. Asobase is a phrase borrowed from the imperial court language of Kyoto and is a renowned expression of the traditional Kanazawa kotoba.

=== Shiramine dialect ===
==== Gira (ぎら) ====
First-person pronoun (I ) used by men in Shiramine. When written in Kanji it becomes 儀等. Recently it has experienced euphony and is often pronounced as gyā (ぎゃー). As with the Fukui dialect, in Kuwajima District, it is said as ura (うら). Its plural forms are girara (ぎらら we) and urara (うらら also we), respectively.

==== Wae (わえ) ====
Second person pronoun (you) used by men in Shiramine. Its e (え) is actually an intermediate sound between i and e. Its plural form is warra (わっら you (guys)).

==== Asai kuwasshaimashita ka yo (あさいくわっしゃいましたかよ) ====
Equivalent to ohayo gozaimasu (おはようございます good morning). The asai (あさい) is a corruption of asameshi (朝飯 breakfast). The expression literally translates to asa-gohan wo o-tabe ni narimashita ka? (朝ごはんをお食べになりましたか? have you eaten breakfast?).

==== Bange de-gozaimasu (ばんげでございます) ====
Equivalent to konbanwa (こんばんは good evening). It literally means ban-gohan (no jikan) de-gozaimasu (晩御飯（の時間）でございます it’s time for dinner).

==== Yoshitai (よしたい) ====
Arigatō (ありがとう thank you). Corruption of yoku shita ne (良くしたね you did well, didn’t you?). Other variants include yoshitai yo (よしたいよ) and yōsasshatta (ようさっしゃった).

==== Hanja (はんじゃ) ====
Equivalent to so shiyō (しよう). Is typically said repeatedly (Hanja hanja (はんじゃはんじゃ)).

==== Shanja (しゃんじゃ) ====
Equivalent to sono toori da (その通りだ that's right) . Sō da kedo (そうだけど yes, but...) is shanja keto (しゃんじゃけっと) and sō da kara (そうだから that’s why...) is shanja-sakai (しゃんじゃさかい).

==== -nyā (-にゃぁ) ====
Equivalent to ~ne (～ね sentence-ending particle used to denote agreement and/or add a softer, friendly tone). For example, ano nya- (あのにゃぁ～ hey, so...). It is a distinctive Shiramine dialect feature and it has led to it sometimes being called the ‘nyā-nyā dialect' in Japanese.

==== -choru (-ちょる) ====
-Shite iru (-している is doing - ). Natte iru (なっている is / has become) becomes nacchoru (なっちょる) in Shiramine.

==== -me (-め) ====
Attaches to animal names. Is not used in Kumajima District. Inu (いぬ dog) = iri-me (いりめ), neko (ねこ cat) = nyoko-me (にょこめ), hebi (へび snake) = hen-me (へんめ), kaeru (かえる frog) = betto-me (べっとめ), etc.

== Vocabulary ==
=== Shiramine dialect ===
English	Standard Japanese	Shiramine dialect
Goodbye	sayōnara (さようなら)	noino (のいの)
Let's do that	sō shiyō (そうしよう)	hanja (はんじゃ)*
Could you do ~ for me?	~kurenai ka (~くれないか)	~kurenko (～くれんこ)
Icicle	tsurara (つらら)	gamadare (がまだれ)
Potato	jagaimo (ジァガイモ)	kattsuki (かっつき)
Your family	anata no kazoku (あなたの家族)	angya no shū (あんぎゃの衆)
Cold (to the touch)	tsumetai (冷たい)	petai (ぺたい)
Beautiful	kirei-na (きれいな)	kekkō-na (けっこうな) / utskushii (うつくしい)
