= Hiroshi Hase =

Japanese politician and professional wrestler

- 馳 浩
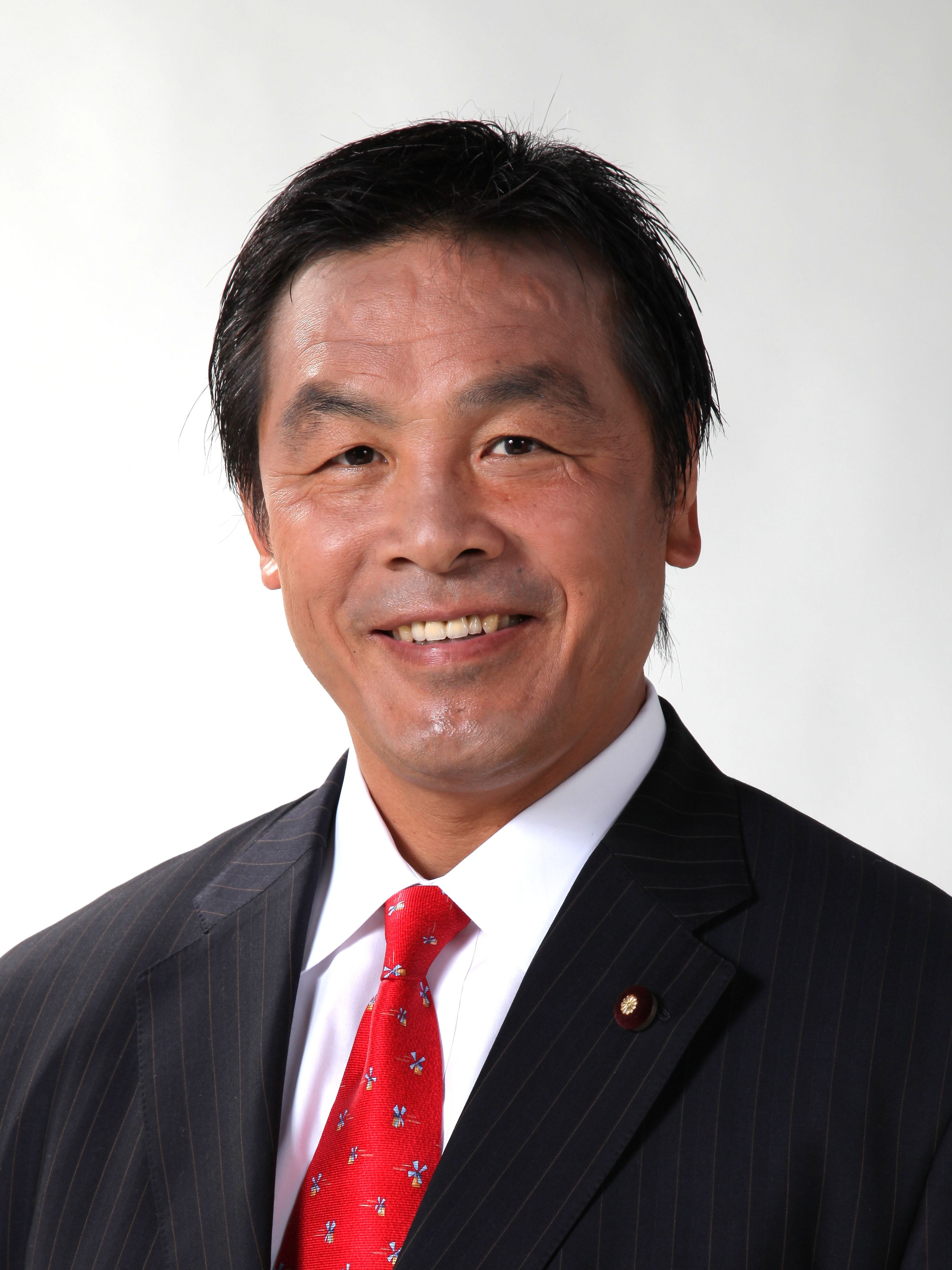
- Official portrait, 2010

Governor of Ishikawa Prefecture
- In office 27 March 2022 – 26 March 2026
- Monarch: Naruhito
- Preceded by: Masanori Tanimoto
- Succeeded by: Yukiyoshi Yamano

Minister of Education, Culture, Sports, Science and Technology
- In office 7 October 2015 – 3 August 2016
- Prime Minister: Shinzō Abe
- Preceded by: Hakubun Shimomura
- Succeeded by: Hirokazu Matsuno

Member of the House of Representatives; from Hokuriku-Shin'etsu
- In office 25 June 2000 – 14 October 2021
- Preceded by: Ken Okuda
- Succeeded by: Takuo Komori
- Constituency: See list: Ishikawa 1st (2000–2003); PR block (2003–2005); Ishikawa 1st (2005–2009); PR block (2009–2012); Ishikawa 1st (2012–2021)

Member of the House of Councillors
- In office 23 July 1995 – 12 May 2000
- Preceded by: Takashi Awamori
- Succeeded by: Tetsuo Kutsukake
- Constituency: Ishikawa at-large

Personal details
- Born: 5 May 1961 (age 65) Oyabe, Toyama, Japan
- Party: Liberal Democratic
- Spouse: Kyoko Takami (m. 1994)
- Education: Senshu University
- Website: http://hase-hiroshi.org/
- Professional wrestling career
- Ring name(s): Hiro Hase; Hiroshi Hase; Viet Cong Express #1
- Billed height: 1.83 m (6 ft 0 in)
- Billed weight: 105 kg (231 lb)
- Billed from: Ho Chi Minh City, North Vietnam (as Viet Cong Express #1)
- Trained by: Riki Choshu; Stu Hart; Tokyo Joe
- Debut: 28 February 1986

Hiroshi Hase (馳 浩, Hase Hiroshi; born 5 May 1961) is a Japanese politician and semi-retired professional wrestler who served as the governor of Ishikawa Prefecture from 2022 to 2026. As a professional wrestler, Hase primarily worked for New Japan Pro-Wrestling (NJPW), and also for All Japan Pro Wrestling (AJPW) and Stampede Wrestling. During his affiliation with AJPW, he also served as the chairman for the Pacific Wrestling Federation (PWF), which is the governing body for all championships in the promotion. Among his numerous title wins, Hase held the WCW International World Heavyweight Championship once, making him a one-time world champion.

From October 2015 until August 2016, Hase served as the Minister of Education, Culture, Sports, Science and Technology under Prime Minister Shinzō Abe and his LDP party. Prior to his appointment in the Cabinet, he also served as a member of the House of Representatives of the National Diet, representing the 1st district of Ishikawa Prefecture.

== Early life ==
Hase graduated from Senshu University in March 1984. He then became a teacher of classic Japanese literature in a high school in Ishikawa Prefecture, before pursuing a professional wrestling career in 1985.

Hase also became an amateur wrestler, representing Japan at the 1984 Summer Olympics in Los Angeles. He placed ninth in the Greco-Roman wrestling tournament.

== Professional wrestling career ==
=== Early years (1986–1987) ===
Originally trained by Riki Choshu, Hase began his pro wrestling career in February 1986, training at Carlos Colón's World Wrestling Council-affiliated training facility in Puerto Rico. Later that year, Hase went to Calgary, Alberta, Canada, where he was trained by Stu Hart and Katsuji Adachi. He would wrestle in Stampede Wrestling under a mask in a heel tag team known as the Viet Cong Express with Fumihiro Niikura, with whom he held the Stampede International Tag Team Championship. By 1987, he turned face and started to wrestle under his name and unmasked in Stampede Wrestling. By the end of 1987, Hase would return to Japan.

=== New Japan Pro-Wrestling (1987–1996) ===
When he returned to Japan, Hase wrestled for NJPW's junior heavyweight division, winning the IWGP Junior Heavyweight Championship twice. He defeated Kuniaki Kobayashi on 27 December 1987, and held it until 27 May 1988, losing the title to Owen Hart. His second reign began by defeating Shiro Koshinaka on 16 March 1989, and held it until 25 May 1989, losing it to Jushin Liger. In June 1989, Hase and Takayuki Iizuka went to the Soviet Union to be trained in sambo, where he learned one of his signature moves, the uranage. He would also become one of the only wrestlers, Japanese or American, to successfully graduate from the junior heavyweight to heavyweight class.

In the 1990s, Hase had many memorable encounters with famous Japanese talents first in New Japan, and later All Japan. In June 1990, Hase had a near-death experience in the ring, after being knocked out by a backdrop from Tatsutoshi Goto. Hase would form a successful tag team with Kensuke Sasaki in March 1990, winning the IWGP Tag Team Championship twice. On 1 November 1990, Hase and Sasaki defeated Masahiro Chono and Keiji Muto to win the title and held on to the titles until 26 December 1990, losing them to Super Strong Machine and Hiro Saito. Their second reign came by regaining them from Machine and Saito on 6 March 1991, but lost the titles on 21 March 1991, to the Steiner Brothers. Hase was involved in a classic 14 December 1992, encounter with The Great Muta, in which the "Muta Scale" was created, due to the incredible amount of blood shed by Muta, which was payback for Muta bloodying Hase on 14 September 1990.

Hase and Muto were also regular tag team partners; they won the IWGP Tag Team Championship twice. Their first reign began on 5 November 1991, defeating Rick Steiner and Scott Norton in a decision match. They would hold on to the belts until 1 March 1992, losing them to Big Van Vader and Bam Bam Bigelow. Hase and Muto won the Super Grade Tag League in November 1993, defeating The Jurassic Powers in the final. On 16 March 1994, Hase defeated Rick Rude to win the WCW International World Heavyweight Championship, and he re-lost the title to Rude on 24 March 1994. Hase and Muto won their second Super Grade Tag League in October 1994. On 25 November 1994, Hase and Muto defeated The Hellraisers to win their second IWGP Tag Team title. They would hold on to the titles until May 1995, as they vacated the titles after Muto won the IWGP Heavyweight Championship.

While still IWGP Tag Team Champion, Hase travelled to North Korea to participate in Collision in Korea in April 1995. At the two-night event, he defeated Chris Benoit on the first night then teamed up with his old tag team partner Sasaki against the Steiner Brothers on the second night.

The following year he announced his retirement from New Japan, only to jump to the rival All Japan Pro Wrestling. His last singles bout as a NJPW wrestler was against Kensuke Sasaki on 4 January 1996. He wrestled one more match for NJPW on 26 July 1996, teaming with Sasaki, losing to Riki Choshu and Yuji Nagata.

=== All Japan Pro-Wrestling (1997–2006) ===
After a brief hiatus, he made his return to pro wrestling in All Japan Pro Wrestling (AJPW) in January 1997. In All Japan, Hase did not contend for any top titles despite his name recognition, as he made politics his full-time job.

In 2000, he founded the multi-promotional Bad Ass Translate Trading stable with Keiji Muto, Taiyō Kea and Jinsei Shinzaki; Hase and Muto reformed their team to battle Jun Akiyama and Yuji Nagata on 8 October, the rising stars of their respective promotions (NOAH and NJPW), and were defeated in a ceremonial passing of the torch match that highlighted the advancement of professional wrestling in Japan.

When Muto (along with Satoshi Kojima and Kendo Ka Shin) jumped to All Japan the following year, Hase was seen as having influenced them (if not Muto at least) in their decision. Antonio Inoki, who had once preceded Hase to the Japanese Diet, blasted Hase and suggested that he resign his position in the Diet, but nothing came out of this.

Hase's final match for 11 years occurred on 27 August 2006. He tagged with Katsuhiko Nakajima and Satoshi Kojima to face Taru, Suwama and "brother" Yasshi of the Voodoo Murderers. The match was originally supposed to have Kensuke Sasaki in it to team with Hase and Kojima, but he was replaced with Nakajima following an eye injury. Sasaki was still a presence in the match, working ringside to keep Voodoo Murders' heelish antics at bay and entering the ring at one point. Hase pinned Yasshi with a Northern Light Suplex for the victory, ending his in-ring career after 20 years. A week later, he was elected into the Wrestling Observer Newsletter Hall of Fame.

=== Retirement ===
On 10 July 2007, Hase took over the duty of the Pacific Wrestling Federation chairman, after Stan Hansen (who held the position since 2000) voluntarily resigned from the position. On 17 March 2013, Hase announced that he was stepping down as chairman for the PWF after nearly six years. His last day as PWF chairman was 21 June 2013.

=== Return to wrestling (2017–present) ===
On 26 July 2017, Hase returned to the ring at a Pro Wrestling Masters event, produced by Keiji Muto. Wrestling his first match in 11 years, Hase teamed with Riki Choshu and Tatsumi Fujinami to defeat The Great Muta, The Great Kabuki and TNT in a six-man tag team match. On 5 August 2018, Hiroshi Hase was revealed as the special partner of Riki Choshu and Jun Akiyama on an All Japan show, victorious against Naoya Nomura, Yoshitatsu and Kazma Sakamoto. On 21 August, as he teamed up with Taiyō Kea, Shinjiro Otani, and Jinsei Shinzaki for a special one-night BATT reunion on Muto's Pro Wrestling Masters; defeating the Heisei Ishingun team of Akira, Akitoshi Saito, Shiro Koshinaka and Masashi Aoyagi. Since then, Hase has made two one-off appearances for Pro Wrestling NOAH, most recently on 1 January 2023, teaming up with Kazuyuki Fujita, Nosawa Rongai and Kendo Kashin in a winning effort against Masakatsu Funaki, Katsuhiko Nakajima, Manabu Soya and Hajime Ohara.

== Political career ==
In July 1995, Hase was elected into the Japanese House of Councillors, the upper house of the National Diet, as an independent candidate representing the Ishikawa Prefecture. This made him the second professional wrestler-turned-politician to be elected in a parliamentary seat, the first being Antonio Inoki.

In 2000, he was elected as a member of the House of Representatives, representing Ishikawa Prefecture. From 2005 to 2006, he also served as the Senior Vice Minister of Education, Culture, Sports, Science and Technology.

As a lawmaker, Hase has primarily focused on issues involving education, welfare, sports, and environment. He is a defender of the Hague Convention and supports legislation intended to ensure visitation rights between children and their parents separated through divorce or other marital disputes in Japan.

On 7 October 2015, Prime Minister Shinzō Abe announced Hase as part of his cabinet, naming him the Minister of Education, Culture, Sports, Science and Technology. He replaced Hakubun Shimomura, who stepped down from the post after being accused of mishandling the main stadium project for the 2020 Summer Olympics in Tokyo. He also led a multiparty caucus intended to examine discrimination against the LGBT community in Japan, a move that was also intended to prepare the country for the Olympics.

In April 2020, Hase was accused of "patronizing, sexist behavior and harassment" at the Tsubomi Cafe in Shibuya, Tokyo. In the report, it was outlined that, along with fellow constituents of the Liberal Democratic Party, Hase had been using aggressive behavior towards female staff members, many of which had been abused prior to employment with the cafe. The association aligned with the cafe, Colabo, stated that Hase "touched [a woman's] waist with both his hands when she was working to set up a tent". On his website, Hase denied an allegation made by the organization of sexual assault, but apologized for his behavior.

[...] I am moving back and forth in a narrow space, such as unloading materials from the bus and setting up tents using that material. Whether or not I put my hand on her waist while saying, “Go for a bit,” is completely unconscious. However, if that is the case, [I am] very sorry and [I] sincerely apologize. [...] It is very difficult for the government to support and support such young girls, which is out of reach of the government, and it also helps prevent sexual violence and sexual crime. Some of the supporting members of NPOs were women who were involved, so it is necessary for them to support the support activities that they can do.

On 13 March 2022, Hase was elected as the Governor of Ishikawa Prefecture in a crowded race.

In the 2026 Ishikawa gubernatorial election, Hase lost to Yukiyoshi Yamano, former mayor of Kanazawa, after a close race and lost re-election.

== Personal life ==
In 1994, Hase married Kyoko Takami, the daughter of writer Jun Takami.

== Championships and accomplishments ==
- New Japan Pro-Wrestling

- IWGP Junior Heavyweight Championship (2 times)
- IWGP Tag Team Championship (4 times) – with Kensuke Sasaki (2), and Keiji Muto (2)
- Super Grade Tag League (1993, 1994) – with Keiji Muto
- Tag Team Best Bout (2001) with Keiji Muto vs. Jun Akiyama and Yuji Nagata on 8 October

- Nikkan Sports
  - Match of the Year (2001) – with Keiji Muto vs. Jun Akiyama and Yuji Nagata on 8 October
- Pro Wrestling Illustrated
  - PWI ranked him #80 of the top 500 singles wrestlers of the "PWI Years" in 2003
  - PWI ranked him #22 of the Top 100 Tag Teams of the "PWI Years" with The Great Muta in 2003
  - PWI ranked him #27 of the Top 100 Tag Teams of the "PWI Years" with Kensuke Sasaki in 2003
- Stampede Wrestling
  - Stampede International Tag Team Championship (1 time) – with Fumihiro Niikura
  - Stampede Wrestling Hall of Fame (Class of 1995)
- Tokyo Sports
  - Rookie of the Year (1988)
  - Technique Award (1991)
- World Championship Wrestling
  - WCW International World Heavyweight Championship (1 time)
- Wrestling Observer Newsletter
  - Match of the Year (1991) with Kensuke Sasaki vs. Rick and Scott Steiner at the WCW/New Japan Supershow, 21 March Tokyo, Japan
  - Best Technical Wrestler (1993)
  - Wrestling Observer Newsletter Hall of Fame (Class of 2006)

^{1}The championship was won in Tokyo, Japan as part of an interpromotional card between New Japan Pro-Wrestling and World Championship Wrestling.

Political offices
Preceded by Hakubun Shimomura	Minister of Education, Culture, Sports, Science and Technology; 2015–2016	Succeeded by Hirokazu Matsuno
Preceded by Masanori Tanimoto	Governor of Ishikawa Prefecture; 2022–2026	Succeeded by Yukiyoshi Yamano
