= Family law in Japan =

The main family law of Japan is Part IV of Civil Code (民法, Minpō). The Family Register Act (戸籍法, Kosekihō) contains provisions relating to the family register (戸籍, Koseki) and notifications to the public office.

== Background ==
The ie (家) or "household" was the basic unit of Japanese law, from the founding of the Meiji Civil Code in 1896, until the end of World War II: most civil and criminal matters were considered to involve families rather than individuals. The ie was considered to consist of grandparents, their son and his wife and their children, although even in 1920, 54% of Japanese households already were nuclear families.

This system was formally abolished with the 1947 revision of Japanese family law under the influence of the allied occupation authorities, and Japanese society began a transition to a more Americanized nuclear family system. However, the number of nuclear families only slightly increased until 1980, when it reached 63%, and the Confucian principles underlying the "ie" concept only gradually faded and are still informally followed to some degree by many Japanese people today.

== Marriage ==
Marriage of Japan's formality takes the form of civil marriage. A marriage is effected by filing notification of it. A wedding ceremony performed by a religious or fraternal body is not a necessary element for a legal marriage.

According to Articles 731–737 of the Civil Code,

- A man before attaining 18 years of age, a woman before attaining 16 years of age, may not marry. (Article 731)
- A minor shall obtain the consent of at least one parent to marry. (Article 737)
- Bigamy is prohibited. (Article 732)
- [declared unconstitutional in 2016 by the Supreme Court: A woman may not remarry within six months of the day of dissolution or cancellation of the previous marriage, except the case in which she both gets pregnant before the day and gives birth to the child. #1 (Article 733)]
- Lineal relatives by blood, collateral relatives within the third degree of kinship by blood #2, may not marry, except between an adopted child and their collateral relatives by blood through adoption. #3 (Article 734)
- Lineal relatives by affinity may not marry. #3 (Article 735)
- An adoptive parent or a lineal ascendant of an adoptive parent may not marry with an adopted child, their spouse, their lineal descendant, or a spouse of their lineal descendant. #3 (Article 736)
1. It is considered that this remarriage prohibition is to avoid confusion as to the identification of the child's father.
2. between one and one's sibling, uncle, aunt, nephew, niece by blood.
3. It may be a case in which this prohibition shall apply after the termination of a family relationship between the two parties.

If one or both in the couple is a Japanese national, the marriage is recorded in a family register with one concerned Japanese at its head.

It is a rule in principle that the two shall have the family name in common following their marriage. However, if one of them is a non-Japanese, this rule does not apply. They can use one of the spouse's names as their family name or keep their names after marriage. If a Japanese spouse changes their family name to their spouse's, the name change must be filed within six months of the marriage. A foreigner does not have an individual entry in a family register; however, they may be recorded in it as a spouse.

== Children ==
=== Paternity ===
A child born to a married woman is assumed to be the child of her husband, although her husband may file in family court to disavow paternity if the paternity of the child is questioned. If a child is born to an unmarried woman, or if paternity is disavowed by the mother's husband, the father may later claim paternity through family court proceedings, or the child may file in family court to force his or her father to be recognized as the father.

Children are given the family name of their parents at the time of birth. If the father is unknown at the time of the child's birth, the child is given the family name of the mother, but may have his or her name changed to the father's family name after the father recognizes paternity.

=== Adoption ===
Child adoption in Japan is relatively uncommon, mainly due to lack of government support and legal trouble encountered from the child's birth parents. In Japan, even if a parent is legally unfit to see their child, the parent is still the child's legal guardian and their consent is required for everyday decisions, such as the child's education or field trips that may pose safety concerns. This is an issue even for parents looking to adopt because a child adopted over the age of six will still be registered in their birth parent's koseki, as written in Article 817-2 of the Japanese Civil Code. As a result, if parents want a special adoption, where the child is registered under the new parent's koseki, the child has to be under the age of 6.

There are two main places to apply to for adoption. The first is a religious adoption agency. These private agencies are allowed to charge a fee for the adoption process, as opposed to the process being free through the government.

The other is the local Child Guidance Center, which is a government agency. In 2010, United Nations Convention on the Rights of the Child noted that the CGC staff did not seem to be properly trained to work in child services and did not seem to be promoting adoption. In 2016, the Child Welfare Act was revised to explicitly state that the CGCs were responsible for the adoption process. Furthermore, when adopting through government agencies, prospective parents must be Japanese married couples.

=== Surrogacy and reproductive technology ===
==== Surrogacy ====
Although there is no law banning birth by surrogacy in Japan, there is a strong stigma against it. "Japan's first surrogate birth was announced in 2001 and led to the Health Ministry calling for an immediate ban. Although this was blocked, the Society of Obstetrics and Gynecology successfully managed to prohibit [its members from conducting] surrogate births in 2003, citing the mental and physical burden to the surrogate mother and the fear that surrogacy could confuse familial relationships."

As a result, Japanese couples tend to seek surrogate mothers abroad. However, "current law in Japan states that the mother of a child is the one who gives birth to the baby," and that children must be registered in the koseki (family registry) to be a Japanese citizen. Since the surrogate is not Japanese and the father is not the surrogate's legal husband, the legal status of children born via surrogates may end up in question. A famous case of this issue is that of the Japanese actress, Aki Mukai, who had twin sons through an American surrogate mother in 2003. The boys only had American citizenship, which resulted in a series of court cases that ultimately culminated in the Supreme Court concluding that surrogacy was ethically wrong and Mukai had to adopt her sons to be considered their mother.

In 2005, a Tokyo-based sperm bank called Excellence began offering surrogate mothers and assisted conception services in South Korea to Japanese couples. At the time, it was the only Japanese company known to provide such a service, according to Excellence's head Yuji Sasaki.

In 2006, a doctor enabled a 61-year-old woman to carry the child of her daughter who was unable to give birth herself after cancer treatment. "The procedure was performed at the Suwa Maternity Clinic by Yahiro Netsu, a long standing supporter of surrogacy procedures. In a statement issued to the press, it said: 'The clinic hopes that Japan will hold forward-looking discussions on surrogate births and that it will take place in Japan without abuses.'" In light of this procedure, "then-Prime Minister Shinzo Abe told reporters that the issue of surrogacy is 'very difficult' and Sanae Takaichi, state minister for gender, equality and population has said that 'the discussion is highly welcome, but it is extremely difficult to judge whether surrogate birth can be encouraged.'"

In 2008, Manyi Yamada was born using donated eggs, the sperm of a Japanese man Ikufumi Yamada, and an Indian surrogate mother. Yamada and his Japanese wife divorced before Manyi's birth and the latter withdrew her consent to adopt Manyi, which left Yamada's application as a single father unlikely to be accepted. An Indian child welfare charity Satya petitioned unsuccessfully to gain custody of Manyi, claiming that "'they have violated Indian laws by not signing a surrogacy agreement and taking custody of a child abandoned by its mother.' The Japanese Justice Minister, Okiharu Yasuoka, indicated to reporters that he would consider granting Manyi a visa but that the legality of the birth was something that would need to be addressed in the near future. 'Whether to permit surrogate pregnancy is a matter to be discussed by respective institutions...The ministry will study the possibilities under the law out of consideration for the child's future.'" Ultimately, the Indian Supreme Court granted custody of Manyi to her grandmother Emiko Yamada.

"The son of a wealthy IT entrepreneur, Mitsutoki Shigeta attracted controversy in 2014 after Thai officials raided his flat in Bangkok on suspicion of human trafficking and found at least nine babies, nannies and a pregnant woman." He was quoted as saying 'The best thing I can do for the world is to leave many children,' and as hoping to father between 100 and 1,000 babies. "The case, which became known as the 'baby factory' scandal in the press, cast a spotlight on Thailand's surrogacy industry and the Thai government shortly afterwards introduced a ban on foreigners from paying for surrogacy in the country." A year later, the Thai "Women and Child Welfare Protection Bureau, which is currently taking care of the children, has confirmed that six of the surrogate mothers, three of whom gave birth to twins, are seeking custody," their lawsuit alleging that the bureau is failing to adequately care for the children. By 2018, however, the women had forfeited their rights to the children and the Thai court had awarded paternity rights to "the Japanese businessman"—mostly likely Shigeta—who had fathered them. An additional six babies had also by that point been identified as having been fathered by Shigeta, bringing the total identified so far to 17. A 2018 CNN report revealed that Shigeta has two additional children born to surrogates in India.

==== IVF and artificial insemination ====
Rumors that Empress Masako of Japan had undergone IVF treatments were reported by the UK's The Independent in 2001.

In 2001, a woman used the frozen sperm of her husband who had died two years previously from leukemia. "Originally, when the child's mother tried to register the birth, the local government refused to allow it, on the grounds that the father had died more than 300 days before the birth date and the normal length of human gestation is about 270 days. Under the Japanese Civil Code, a child is not recognized as having been born in wedlock if it is born more than 300 days after the end of a marital relationship." The mother filed a lawsuit to have her son legally recognized as the child of his father, saying that it was her husband's will that they have children and that her son will otherwise face discrimination for being illegitimate. "In November 2003, the first court ruled against the mother on the grounds of 'common sense' saying it was impossible to recognize the father-child relationship in such a case, and that there was little social awareness for acknowledging a deceased man as a child's father, even if his sperm was used. However, in July 2004, the Takamatsu High Court overturned the lower court's ruling. Now, following an appeal, the Supreme Court has overturned the High Court decision, saying that this was not a parent-child relationship that the Civil Code had envisaged. 'No parent-child relationship in a legal sense can be recognized, given the father died before she got pregnant and there is no possibility of the baby being dependent or receiving inheritance', said Justice Ryoji Nakagawa, who heard the appeal."

In 2004, Seiko Noda, a member of parliament for the Liberal Democratic Party, published a book entitled 'Watashi Wa Umitai' (I Want To Give Birth) detailing her unsuccessful treatments and the social stigma that accompanies infertile women in Japan. Seven years later, she sought an American egg donor and made headlines for giving birth at age 50.

In 2015, the ethics committee of the Japanese Institution for Standardising Assisted Reproductive Technology approved the country's first donations of eggs from women unrelated to the recipients. (Before then, 24 babies had been born through egg donation in Japan, but all the donors were either relatives or friends of the recipients.) One study noted that "any children born as a result of the egg donation must be notified of this fact before they enter elementary school. When they reach the age of 15, they may find out the identity of the donors, if they choose to. Children born in Japan as a result of a sperm donation are currently unable to learn the identity of the donor."

In 2019, a married couple wanted to expand their family but discovered that the husband had a hereditary genetic condition. However, "preimplantation genetic diagnosis, where embryos are created via IVF and then tested for the genetic condition, is strictly regulated in Japan and difficult to access." At that time there were also no regulated sperm banks in Japan, the first, the Mirai Life Research Institute (みらい生命研究所) in Saitama Prefecture's Koshigaya City, not being established until July 2021. "Demand for Japanese sperm outstrips supply and only 12 clinics in Japan perform artificial insemination--“non-spousal artificial insemination by donor (AID),” known in Japanese as jinko jyusei (人工授精)—with donor sperm." Furthermore, official sperm donation in Japan is limited to legally married couples or hoteki fufu (法的夫婦); "single women (officially called “elective single mothers” or sentakuteki shinguru maza (選択的シングルマザー)), same-sex couples, and de facto married couples of female-to-male (FTM) trans persons who do not meet the conditions for gender reassignment in the family register are currently excluded from receiving sperm donation." Therefore Japanese couples have to choose between "importing sperm from international sperm banks, which is expensive, or making informal arrangements with private donors outside clinic settings." The latter arrangement is what the wife entered with a man whom she later claimed lied about his identity and credentials. Her subsequent lawsuit for emotional distress and fraud—and decision to place their child up for adoption after its birth—would make headlines.

"Since 2005 so-called “right to know origin” laws were established in Japan to enable children born via AID to be able to identify the original donor...A side effect of this law is that it has become very difficult to attract potential sperm donors who desire to remain anonymous." The lack of donors caused a surge in a so-called "black market" of mail orders made via social networking and 140+ websites, "many nothing more than hook-up scams masquerading as official medical resources."

The first legislation regarding donor conception in Japan was only issued by the Diet on 4 December 2020. This legislation, created in response to the aforementioned 2019 case, "recognized partners in heterosexual couples as the legal parents of any donor-conceived child and further strengthened Article 772 of the Civil Code, which states; 'A child conceived by a wife during marriage shall be presumed to be a child of her husband.'" The Diet is set to next consider "whether to expand the scope of the law to include more than just legal couples."

Then-candidate for Prime Minister Yoshihide Suga, in a 2020 candidacy speech, announced plans to make fertility treatments more widely available by including it on insurance coverage.

== Divorce ==
There are four types of divorce in Japan:

- Divorce by agreement (Kyōgi Rikon), based on mutual agreement.
- Divorce by mediation in a family court (Chōtei Rikon), completed by applying for mediation by the family court (for cases in which divorce by mutual agreement cannot be reached).
- Divorce by decision of the family court (Shinpan Rikon), which is divorce completed by family court decision when divorce cannot be established by mediation.
- Divorce by judgment of a district court (Saiban Rikon). If divorce cannot be established by the family court, then application is made to the district court for a decision (application for arbitration is a prerequisite). Once the case is decided, the court will issue a certified copy and certificate of settlement, to be attached to the Divorce Registration.

"Neither marriage registration nor divorce have to occur in person. One person can submit the documentation with a seal bearing the other's name resulting in a certain number of fraudulent registrations every year."

Foreign citizens must show evidence that they are able to be divorced in their country of nationality and that the procedures used in Japan are compatible with those of their home country.

=== Disputes over child custody and nationality ===
Joint custody of children ends upon divorce. In a divorce by agreement, the husband and wife must determine which parent will have custody of each child. In other types of divorce, custody is determined by the mediator or judge, with a strong preference toward custody by the mother (especially with regard to children born after the divorce).

Joint custody was legally recognized in Japan for the first time in a law enacted in 2024, which takes effect in 2026.

== See also ==
- International child abduction in Japan
- Family policy in Japan
- Recognition of same-sex unions in Japan
