= Premium Passport =

Premium Passport is a support system for large families in Ishikawa prefecture, Japan. The program began in January 2006.

== Overview ==
Families with three or more children under the age of 18 in Ishikawa prefecture can receive special discount cards, called Premium Passport or PRE-PASS, for shopping. The prefectural government issues the card which offers discounts at supermarkets, restaurants, clothing stores and other retailers. The cards had been received by 16,208 of the 16,363 households that were eligible at September 2009.

Shops of participating companies are recognized with a sticker distributed from the prefectural government. The companies can display the sticker at their shops or in their advertisements. The prefectural government lists the companies in newspaper advertisements and public bulletins. 1,023 companies and 1,976 shops had participated at September 2009.

== Purpose ==
Ishikawa Prefecture Governor Masanori Tanimoto explained the program was part of a strategy to encourage larger families in a nation with a falling birthrate, and corporate cooperation was necessary to put the brakes on the decline in the number of children. The prefectural government expected to encourage companies to support employees who were raising children by offering ample maternity or child-rearing leave, among other steps.
