= Masanori Tanimoto =

Japanese politician (born 1945)

- 谷本 正憲

Governor of Ishikawa Prefecture
- In office March 27, 1994 – March 28, 2022
- Preceded by: Yōichi Nakanishi
- Succeeded by: Hiroshi Hase

Vice Governor of Ishikawa Prefecture
- In office December 28, 1991 – March 27, 1994
- Governor: Yōichi Nakanishi

Personal details
- Born: April 16, 1945 (age 81) Nishiwaki, Hyōgo, Japan
- Education: Kyoto University
- Awards: Grand Cordon of the Order of the Rising Sun

Masanori Tanimoto (Japanese: 谷本 正憲, Hepburn: Tanimoto Masanori; born April 16, 1945) is a Japanese politician who was the governor of Ishikawa Prefecture between 1994 and 2022, serving seven terms in total.

== Early life and political career ==
Tanimoto was born in April 16, 1945. He graduated from Kyoto University Faculty of Law in March 1968 and joined the Ministry of Home Affairs (now part of the Ministry of Internal Affairs and Communications) in April. He later became the director of the Shimane Prefectural General Affairs Department, Finance Division on August 1, 1975. He became deputy mayor of Miyazaki City on October 10, 1982. He became the director of the Ibaraki Prefecture Environment Bureau on April 1, 1986, and the department head of Ibaraki Prefecture General Affairs on April 1, 1988. He became the vice governor of Ishikawa Prefecture on December 28, 1991, under Yōichi Nakanishi.

== Governor of Ishikawa Prefecture (1994–2022) ==
He was elected as the governor of Ishikawa on March 27, 1994 following the death of Nakanishi. He was reelected for the seventh and final time, which is the most of any then-incumbent governor in Japan, in 2018, after defeating Ogura Emi.

On November 17, 2021, he announced that he will not run for an eighth term in the 2022 Ishikawa gubernatorial election. He served as the governor of Ishikawa Prefecture of 28 years, the third longest length of service for a governor and along with Nakanishi, were the only governors of Ishikawa for 59 years.

== Post-governorship ==
On November 3, 2023, he was awarded the Grand Cordon of the Order of the Rising Sun. A monument was erected in his honor on November 5 at the Kanazawa Port.

== Personal life ==
Tanimoto is married to Motoko Tanimoto.

== See also ==
- Premium passport

Preceded by Yōichi Nakanishi	Governor of Ishikawa Prefecture; 1994–2022	Succeeded by Hiroshi Hase
