= Teikoku-Shoin =

Teikoku-shoin Co., Ltd.
- Founded: 1926; 100 years ago
- Country of origin: Japan
- Headquarters location: Chiyoda, Tokyo
- Publication types: Textbooks, Map
- Official website: www.teikokushoin.co.jp

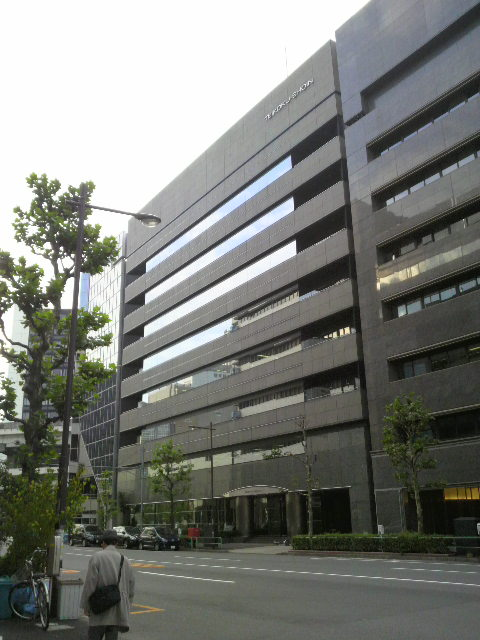
headquarter

Teikoku-Shoin (帝国書院, Teikoku Shoin) is a Japanese textbook and map publisher company based in Chiyoda, Tokyo. Since before the Second World War, the company has holding a high share of the market for geography textbooks and atlases. Teikoku-Shoin was found in 1917 by Susabio Moriya.
