= Yōichi Nakanishi =

Japanese politician (1917–1994)

- 中西 陽一

Governor of Ishikawa Prefecture
- In office 20 February 1963 – 2 February 1994
- Monarchs: Hirohito; Akihito
- Preceded by: Jūjitsu Taya
- Succeeded by: Masanori Tanimoto

Personal details
- Born: 23 September 1917 Kyoto, Japan
- Died: 2 February 1994 (aged 76) Kanazawa, Ishikawa, Japan
- Party: Liberal Democratic
- Education: Kyoto Imperial University
- Awards: Grand Cordon of the Order of the Rising Sun (1994)

Military service
- Allegiance: Empire of Japan
- Branch/service: Imperial Japanese Army
- Years of service: 1942–1945

Yōichi Nakanishi (Japanese: 中西陽一, Hepburn: Nakanishi Yōichi; 23 September 1917 – 2 February 1994) was a Japanese politician who served as Governor of Ishikawa Prefecture from 1963 until his death in 1994. He holds the records for the most terms served and longest-serving governor in Japan. He was a graduate of Kyoto University and a member of the Liberal Democratic Party. Prior to being elected as a governor, he was a member of the Imperial Japanese Army during the Pacific War.

== Biography ==
He was born on 23 September 1917 in Kyoto. He graduated from Kyoto Imperial University, Faculty of Law in 1942. He briefly worked for the Home Ministry in 1942 before being conscripted into the Imperial Japanese Army. During his military service during the Pacific War, he belonged to a unit of the Epidemic Prevention and Water Purification Department - Northern China that was involved in human experimentation. After the war, he became the head of the Education Division of Oita Prefecture, then the head of the Labor Policy Division of Kyoto Prefecture, and head of the General Affairs Department of Ishikawa Prefecture in 1955. He later became vice governor of Ishikawa Prefecture. He decided to run for the 1963 Ishikawa governatorial election, and was endorsed by the Liberal Democratic Party. He was elected as Governor of Ishikawa Prefecture on 10 February 1963.

He began his tenure on 20 February 1963. In 1991, he was elected for the eighth time, which is the most in Japan. He also broke the record for longest-serving governor in Japan in July 1991. He died on 2 February 1994. He served as the governor of Ishikawa for 30 years and 11 months. He was succeeded by Masanori Tanimoto, who served for 28 years, being elected for seven terms.

He was awarded the Grand Cordon of the Order of the Rising Sun after his death in February 1994.

Preceded by Jūjitsu Taka	Governor of Ishikawa Prefecture; 1963–1994	Succeeded by Masanori Tanimoto
