= Ishikawa Prefecture =

Prefecture of Japan

Ishikawa Prefecture 石川県
- Prefecture

Japanese transcription(s)
  - Japanese: 石川県
  - Rōmaji: Ishikawa-ken
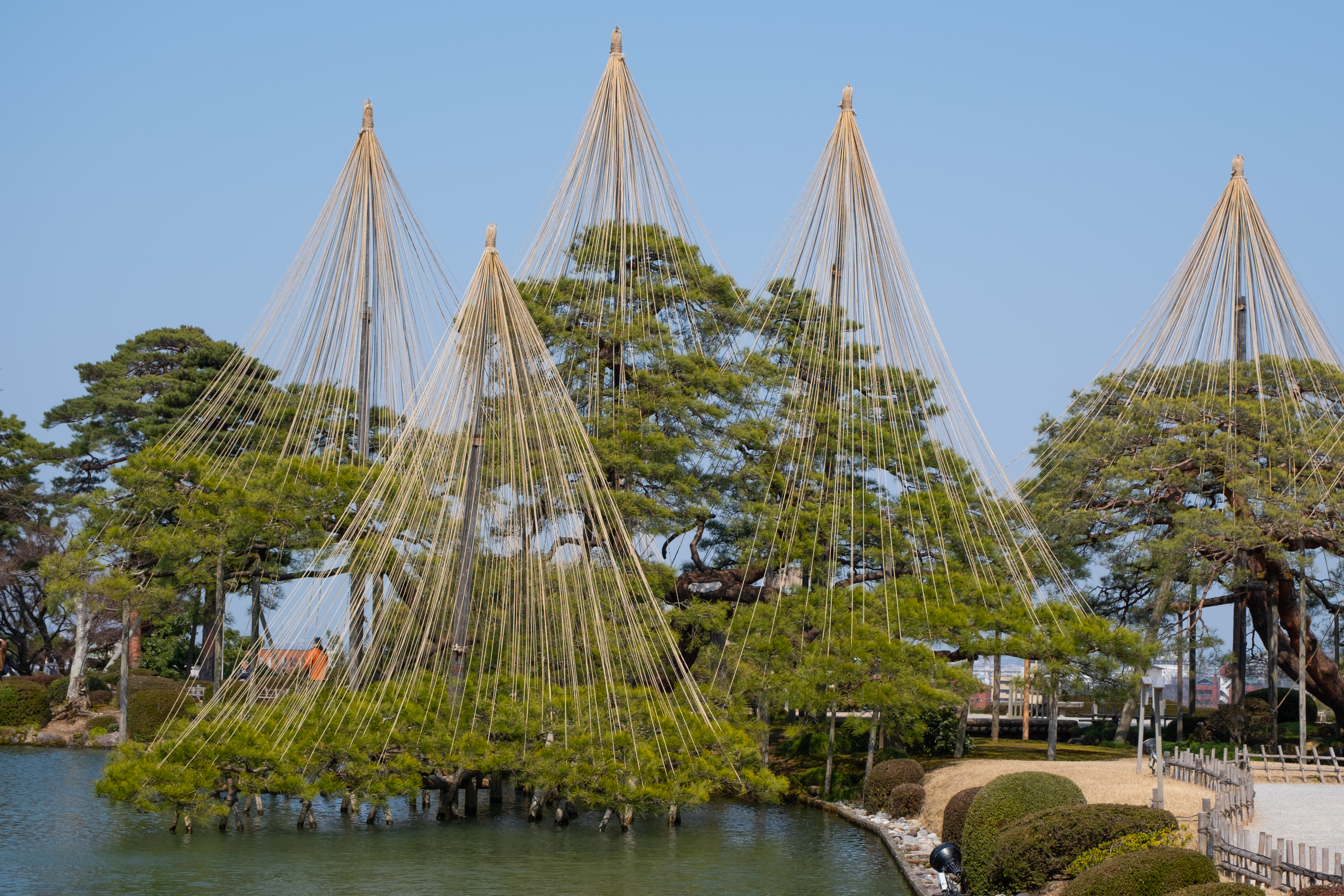
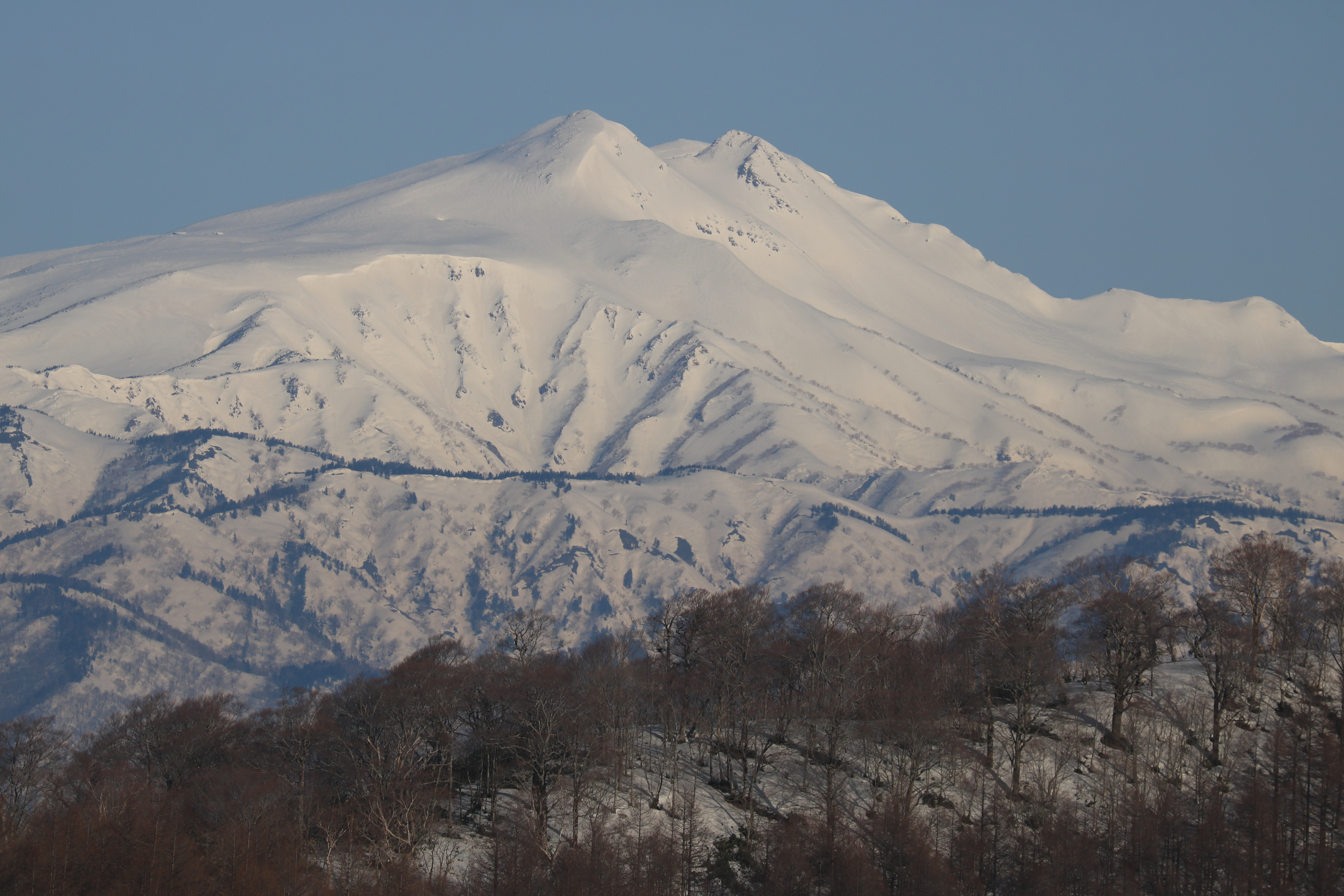
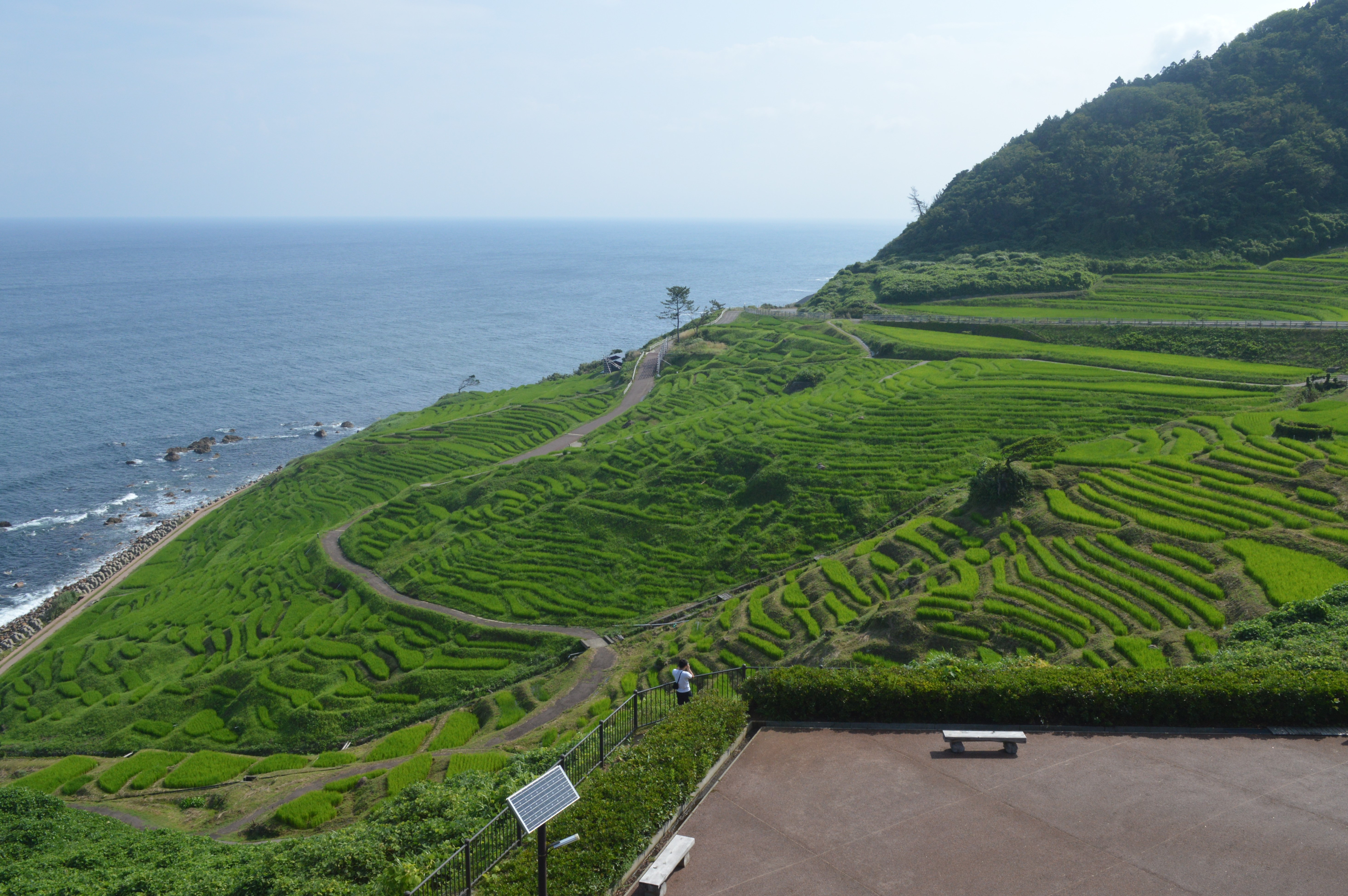
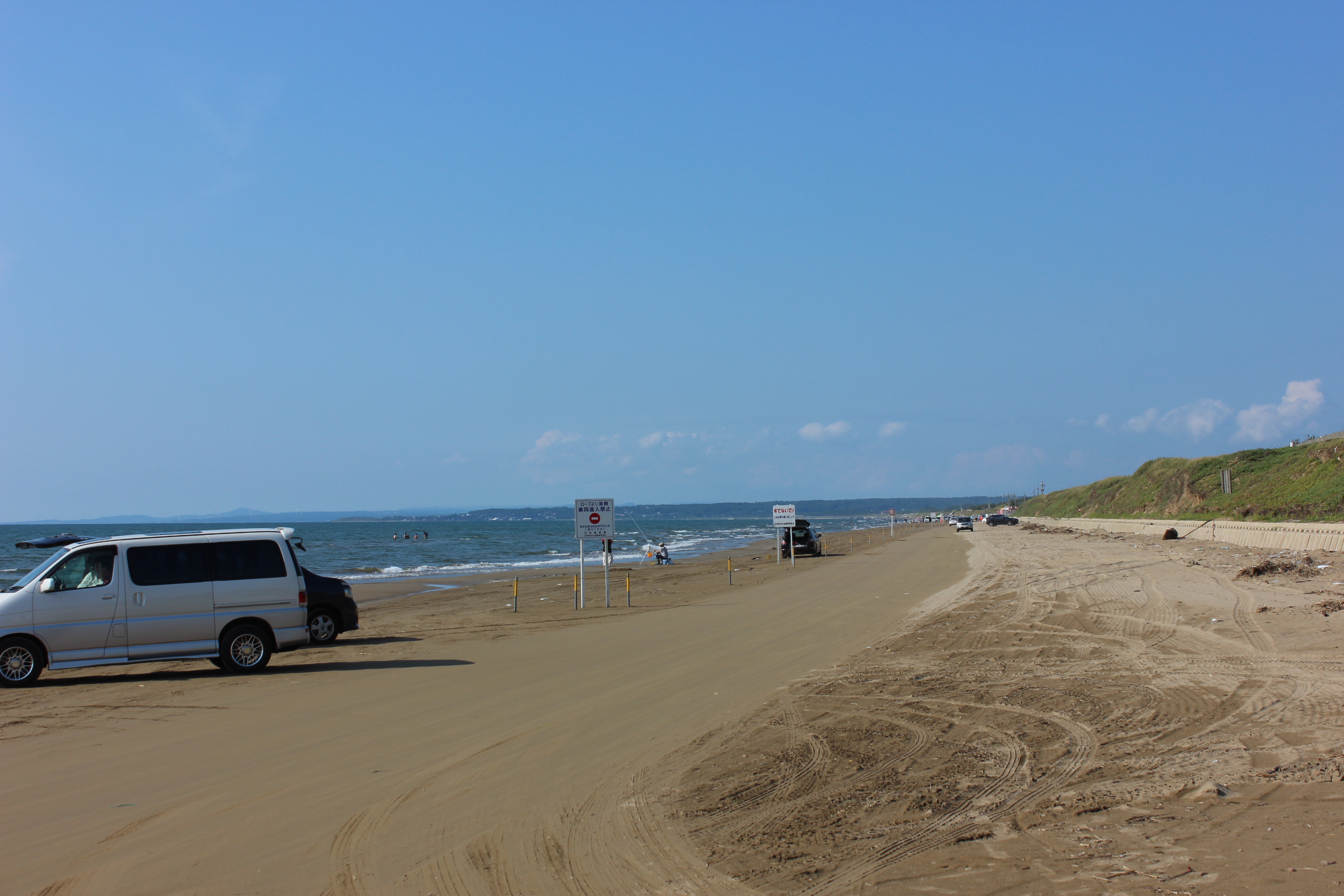
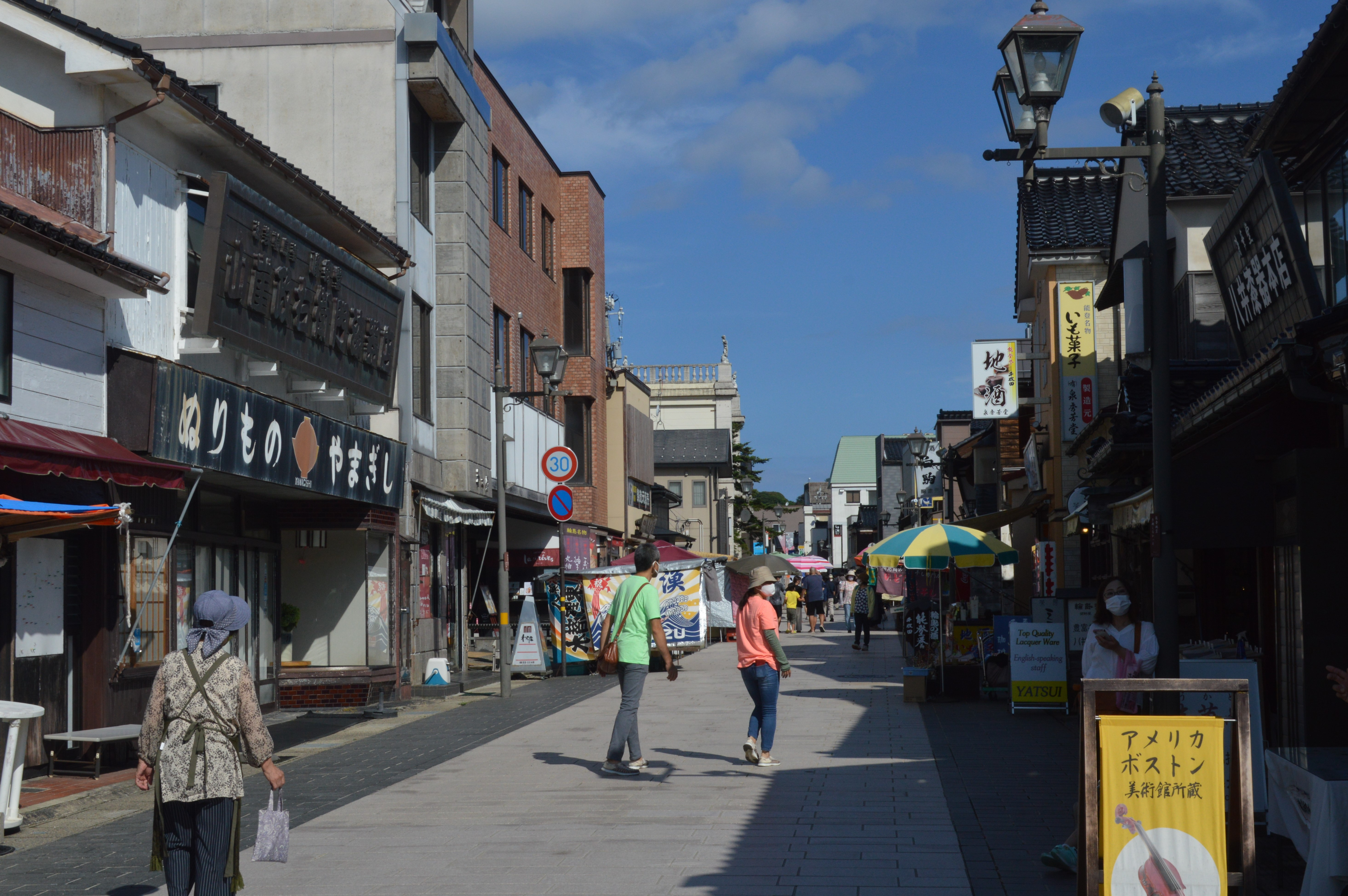
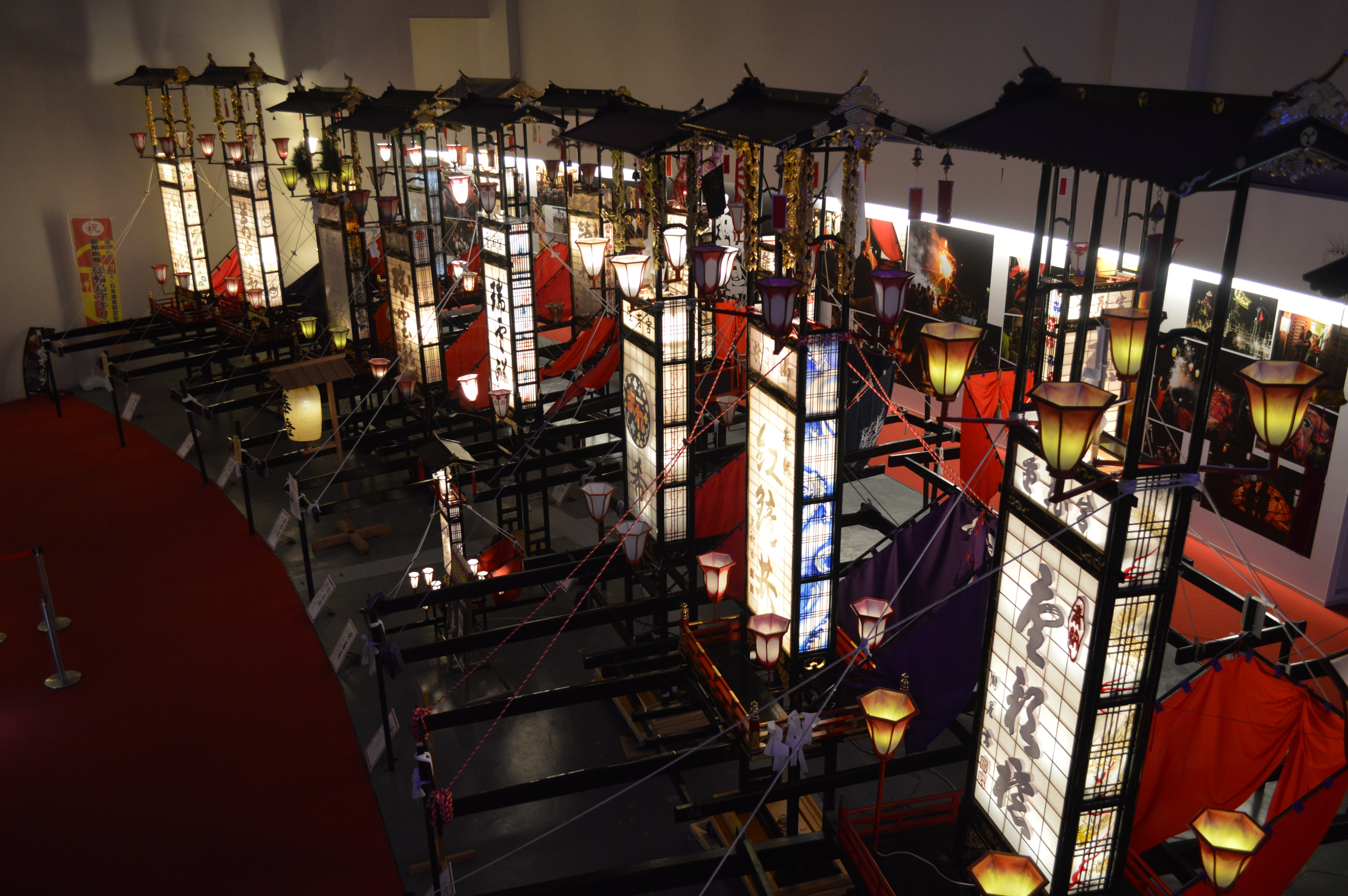
- Before winter season of Kenrokuen, Kanazawa View of Mount Haku, from Meiho ski resort Shiroyone rice terrace in Wajima Chiri beach driveway in Hakui Morning street market in Wajima Noto traditional Kiriko Standstalls in Wajima Kiriko Art Museum

- Flag Symbol
- Anthem: Ishikawa Kenmin no Uta
- Coordinates: 36°35′42″N 136°37′30″E
- Country: Japan
- Region: Chūbu; Hokuriku
- Island: Honshu
- Capital: Kanazawa
- Subdivisions: Districts: 5, Municipalities: 19

Government
  - Governor: Yukiyoshi Yamano

Area
  - Total: 4,190.94 km^{2} (1,618.13 sq mi)
  - Rank: 34th

Population (October 1, 2020)
  - Total: 1,133,294
  - Rank: 34th
  - Density: 270.73/km^{2} (701.2/sq mi)
  - Dialects: Kaga・Noto

GDP
  - Total: JP¥ 4,717 billion US$ 34.8 billion (2022)
- ISO 3166 code: JP-17
- Symbols of Japan
- Bird: Golden eagle (Aquila chrysaetos)
- Flower: Black lily (Fritillaria camtschatcensis)
- Tree: Hiba (Thujopsis dolabrata)

Ishikawa Prefecture (石川県, Ishikawa-ken; Japanese pronunciation: [ì.ɕi̥.kä́.β̞ä́(.kè̞ɴ̀)]) is a prefecture of Japan located in the Chūbu region of Honshu island. Ishikawa Prefecture has a population of 1,096,721 (1 January 2025) and has a geographic area of 4,191 km^{2} (1618 sq mi). Ishikawa Prefecture borders Toyama Prefecture to the east, Gifu Prefecture to the southeast, and Fukui Prefecture to the south.

Kanazawa is the capital and largest city of Ishikawa Prefecture, with other major cities including Hakusan, Komatsu, and Kaga. Ishikawa is located on the Sea of Japan coast and features most of the Noto Peninsula which forms Toyama Bay, one of the largest bays in Japan. Ishikawa Prefecture is part of the historic Hokuriku region and formerly an important populated center that contained some of the wealthiest han (domains) of the Japanese feudal era. Ishikawa Prefecture is home to Kanazawa Castle, Kenroku-en one of the Three Great Gardens of Japan, Nyotaimori ("body sushi"), and Kutani ware.

== History ==
Ishikawa was formed in 1872 from the merger of Kaga Province and the smaller Noto Province, with the seat of the government being located in Mikawa. The political center of Ishikawa was moved to Kanazawa in 1873.

=== The Kioizaka Incident ===
The newly formed Ishikawa Prefecture came to be regarded with caution by the national government following the Kioizaka Incident in 1878, in which 6 shizoku (士族), dissatisfied by the Meiji government's "maladministration, suppression of civil rights, and misuse of government property", assassinated Japanese statesman Ōkubo Toshimichi. Concerned about the possibility of a Hokuriku bloc forming in support of the Freedom and People's Rights Movement, and thus wanting to weaken the influence of the former Kaga lords, the national government made the decision to divide the prefecture. This took place in two stages, beginning in 1881, when Fukui Prefecture was formed, and ending in 1883 with the formation of Toyama Prefecture.

=== 2024 earthquake ===
On 1 January 2024, a 7.5 magnitude earthquake struck Ishikawa Prefecture, specifically the Noto Peninsula. In Ishikawa, a total of 508 people were killed and 2 people are currently reported missing as a result of the earthquake. Overall it is estimated that 1,200 people were injured across different prefectures.

In September 2024, severe rainfall in the prefecture led to deadly floods and landslides, causing at least six deaths and widespread damage. Thousands were evacuated as rivers overflowed, while recovery from a prior earthquake complicated relief efforts. Emergency warnings remain in place.

== Geography ==
Ishikawa is on the Sea of Japan coast. The northern part of the prefecture consists of the narrow Noto Peninsula, while the southern part is wider and consists mostly of mountains with the prefecture's chief city, Kanazawa, located in the coastal plain. The prefecture also has some islands, including Notojima, Mitsukejima, Hegurajima.

As of 1 April 2012, 13% of the total land area of the prefecture was designated as Natural Parks, namely the Hakusan National Park; Echizen-Kaga Kaigan and Noto Hantō Quasi-national parks; and five prefectural natural parks.

=== Municipalities ===
==== Cities ====
Eleven cities are located in Ishikawa Prefecture:

Name		Area (km^{2})	Population	Map
Rōmaji	Kanji	Area (km^{2})	Population	Map
Hakui	羽咋市	81.85	22,052	
Hakusan	白山市	754.93	113,715	
Kaga	加賀市	305.87	67,793	
Kahoku	かほく市	64.44	35,188	
Kanazawa (capital)	金沢市	468.64	466,029	
Komatsu	小松市	371.05	108,509	
Nanao	七尾市	318.32	49,660	
Nomi	能美市	84.14	50,132	
Nonoichi	野々市市	13.56	54,112	
Suzu	珠洲市	247.20	12,929	
Wajima	輪島市	426.32	24,608	

==== Towns ====
These are the towns in each district:

Name		Area (km^{2})	Population	District	Map
Rōmaji	Kanji	Area (km^{2})	Population	District	Map
Anamizu	穴水町	183.21	7,782	Hōsu District	
Hōdatsushimizu	宝達志水町	111.52	13,418	Hakui District	
Kawakita	川北町	14.64	6,282	Nomi District	
Nakanoto	中能登町	89.45	18,278	Kashima District	
Noto	能登町	273.27	15,687	Hōsu District	
Shika	志賀町	246.76	20,845	Hakui District	
Tsubata	津幡町	110.59	37,694	Kahoku District	
Uchinada	内灘町	20.33	26,811	Kahoku District	

Municipalities in Ishikawa Prefecture City Town

== Economy ==
Ishikawa's industry is dominated by the textile industry, particularly artificial fabrics, and the machine industry, particularly construction machinery.

== Demographics ==
Ishikawa prefecture population pyramid in 2020

Historical population
Year	Pop.	±% p.a.
1920	747,360	—
1925	750,854	+0.09%
1930	756,835	+0.16%
1935	768,416	+0.30%
1940	757,676	−0.28%
1945	887,510	+3.21%
1950	957,279	+1.53%
1955	966,187	+0.19%
1960	973,418	+0.15%
1965	980,499	+0.15%
1970	1,002,420	+0.44%
1975	1,069,872	+1.31%
1980	1,119,304	+0.91%
1985	1,152,325	+0.58%
1990	1,164,628	+0.21%
1995	1,180,068	+0.26%
2000	1,180,977	+0.02%
2005	1,174,026	−0.12%
2010	1,169,788	−0.07%
2015	1,154,008	−0.27%
2020	1,132,526	−0.38%
Source: Censuses

Ishikawa Prefecture has an area of 4,190.94 km^{2} and, as of 1 April 2011, it has a population of 1,166,643 persons.

Data	Unit	Statistics
Area	km^{2}	4,186.09
Population	Persons	1,166,643
Population density	Persons per km^{2}	278.72
Number of households	Households	441,980
Income per person	Thousand yen	2,707
Power consumed	Kwh per household	6,446
Number of doctors	Physicians per 100,000 people	249

== List of governors of Ishikawa Prefecture ==
- Wakio Shibano (柴野和喜夫) (12 April 1947 to 23 February 1955)
- Jūjitsu Taya (田谷充実) (24 February 1955 to 19 February 1963)
- Yōichi Nakanishi (中西陽一) (23 February 1963 to 2 February 1994)
- Masanori Tanimoto (谷本正憲) (29 March 1994 to 27 March 2022)
- Hiroshi Hase (馳浩) (28 March 2022 to 26 March 2026)
- Yukiyoshi Yamano (山野之義) (27 March 2026 to present)

== Culture ==
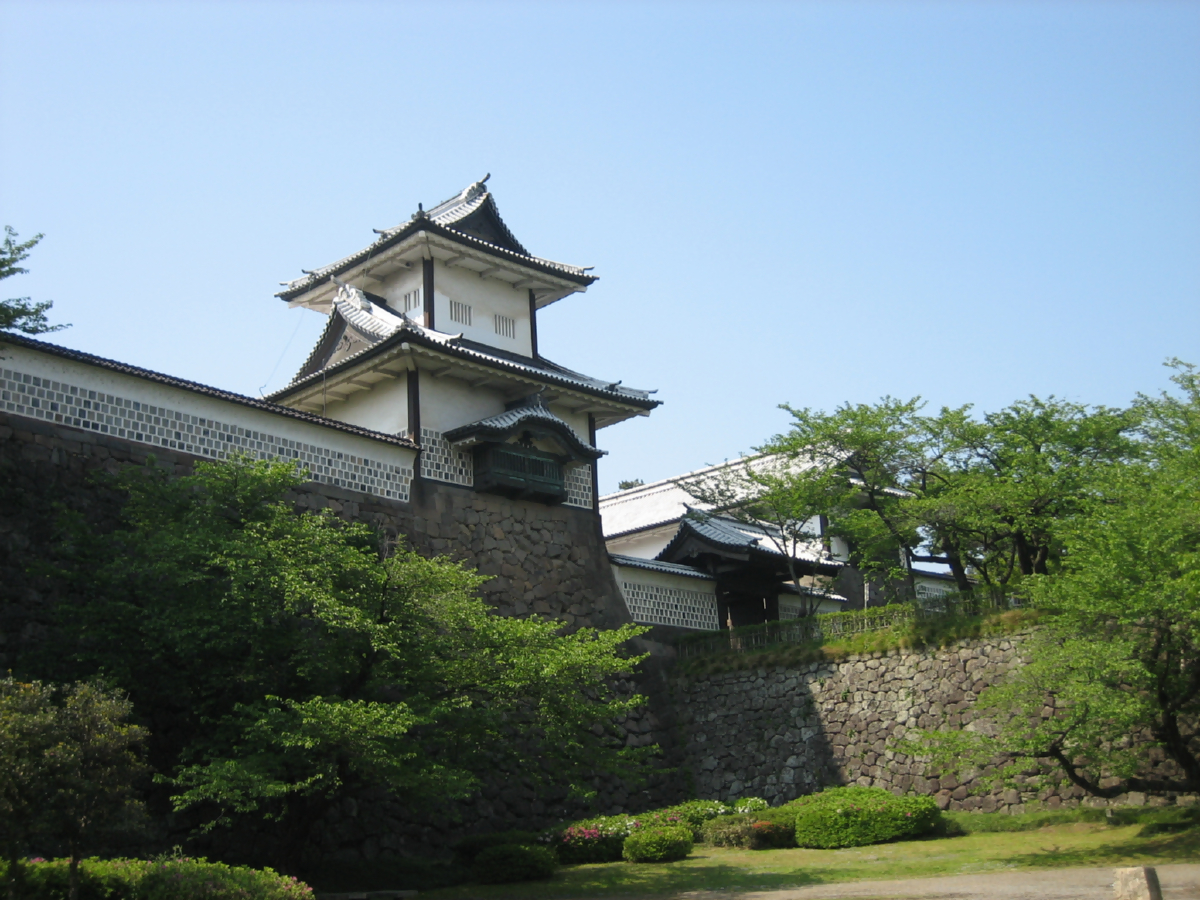
Kanazawa Castle

The area is noted for arts and crafts and other cultural traditions:

- The art of Noh was introduced to the area during the rule of the fifth Maeda lord Tsunanori and was refined into the style of Kaga hosho.
- The tea ceremony was introduced in 1666 when Maeda Toshitsune invited Senbiki Soshitsu of Urasenke to Kanazawa.
- Kutani ware (Kutani yaki) is a bright colored glaze like Chinese porcelain.
- Ohi teaware (Ōhi yaki) is a pottery with a style unique to Kanazawa.
- Nyotaimori or naked sushi is said to have originated in Ishikawa Prefecture.
- Kaga silk (Kaga yūzen) is made with complicated silk print technique with an intentional rough look (wabi-sabi).
- Kanazawa lacquerware (Kanazawa shikki) is high quality lacquerware traditionally decorated with gold dust.
- Kanazawa gold leaf (Kanazawa haku) is produced with a technique of beating gold into wafer-thin sheets.
- Kaga mizuhiki is ribbon-like decoration made from glued Japanese paper (washi).
- Kaga inlay crafts (Kaga zōgan) are made with a combination of thin flat and thread metal inlays.
- Gojinjo Daiko is a Japanese drum, a Wajima city cultural heritage (since 1961) as well as an Ishikawa Prefecture intangible cultural heritage (since 1963).
- Abare Festival is reputed the most 'fierce' festivals of Noto, Ishikawa.
- Japan Tent, an international exchange event.

== Tourism ==
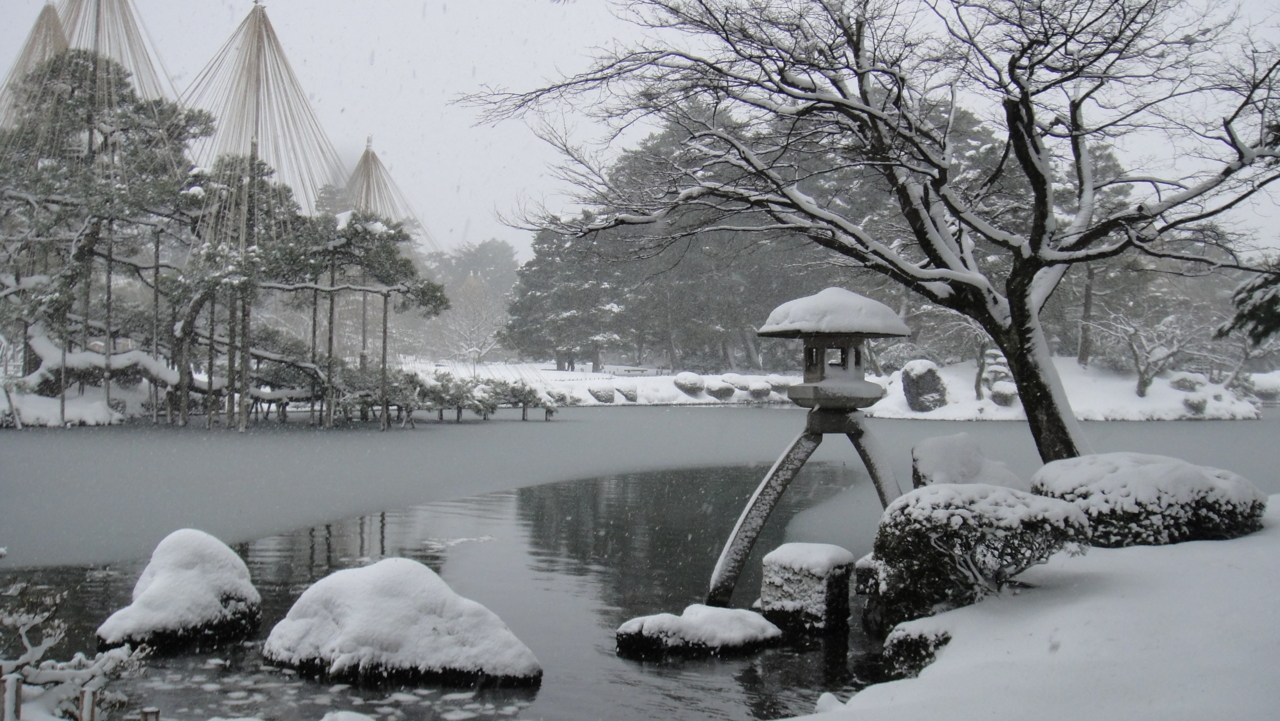
Winter in Kenrokuen

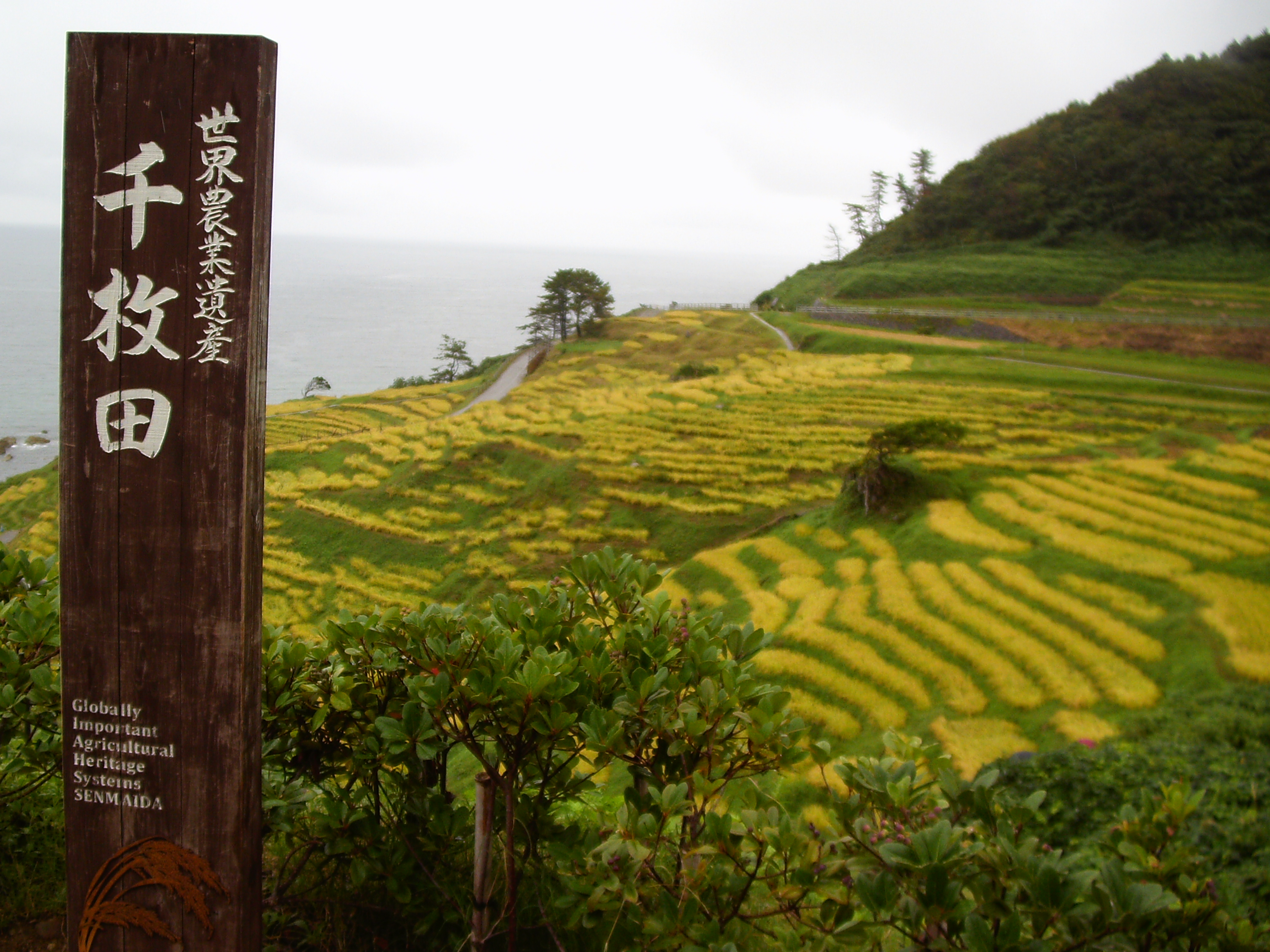
Shirayone Senmaida, designated as a World Agricultural Heritage site in Wajima

The most popular destination in Ishikawa is Kanazawa. Tourists can get to Ishikawa by plane via either the Komatsu or Noto airports. Popular sites include:

- 1000 Rice Fields
- 21st Century Museum of Contemporary Art, Kanazawa
- Notojima Aquarium
- Chirihama Driveway
- Higashi-chaya district in Kanazawa
- Ishikawa Prefectural Museum of Art
- Kaga hot-springs district
- Wakura Onsen
- Kanazawa Castle
- Kenroku-en
- Mount Haku
- Shibayama Lagoon
- Wajima Morning Market

== Prefectural symbols ==
- Fritillaria camschatcensis (flower)
- Golden eagle (bird)
- Thujopsis dolabrata (tree)

== Notable people ==
- Enhō Akira, a professional Sumo wrestler at the Jūryō division.
- Minami Hamabe, an actress.
- Kodai Iida, a professional footballer for OKC Energy FC.
- Kyōka Izumi, author of novels, short stories, and kabuki plays, from Kanazawa.
- Takeshi Kaga, an actor in Japan who is probably best known internationally for his portrayal of Chairman Kaga in the Japanese television show Iron Chef produced by Fuji TV, is from Ishikawa.
- Hideki Matsui, a former Yomiuri Giants and New York Yankees, was born and raised in Neagari Town (now Nomi City), Ishikawa. He gained fame as a baseball player while attending high school in Kanazawa.
- Noa Nakada, an actress
- Daisuke Nakata, a trampolinist who has competed in the Olympics in the past, is from Ishikawa.
- Kitaro Nishida, philosopher, founder of the Kyoto School of philosophy, from Kahoku.
- Murō Saisei, poet and novelist in modern Japanese literature from Kanazawa.
- Daisuke Satō, a board game designer, novelist, and manga writer. His Highschool of the Dead anime/manga series is known for being left unfinished due to his unfortunate death in 2017.
- D. T. Suzuki, Buddhist philosopher and popularizer of Buddhism in the West was born in Kanazawa.
- Yusuke Suzuki, (no relation to D. T. Suzuki) born in 1988, is a racewalker born in Nomi, Ishikawa prefecture.
- Yoshirō Taniguchi, modernist architect and father of architect Yoshio Taniguchi, who designed the D.T. Suzuki Museum in Kanazawa.
- Shūsei Tokuda, author from Kanazawa. (Izumi, Muro, and Tokuda are known as the Three Famous Literary Persons in Ishikawa)

== Universities ==
Ishikawa has a number of universities:

- Kanazawa University
- Hokuriku University
- Ishikawa Prefectural Nursing University
- Japan Advanced Institute of Science and Technology
- Kanazawa College of Art
- International College of Technology, Kanazawa
- Ishikawa Prefectural University
- Kanazawa Gakuin University
- Kanazawa Institute of Technology
- Kanazawa Medical University
- Kanazawa Seiryo University
- Kinjo University
- Hokuriku Gakuin University
- Komatsu University
- Hokuriku Gakuin University

== Transport ==
=== Rail ===
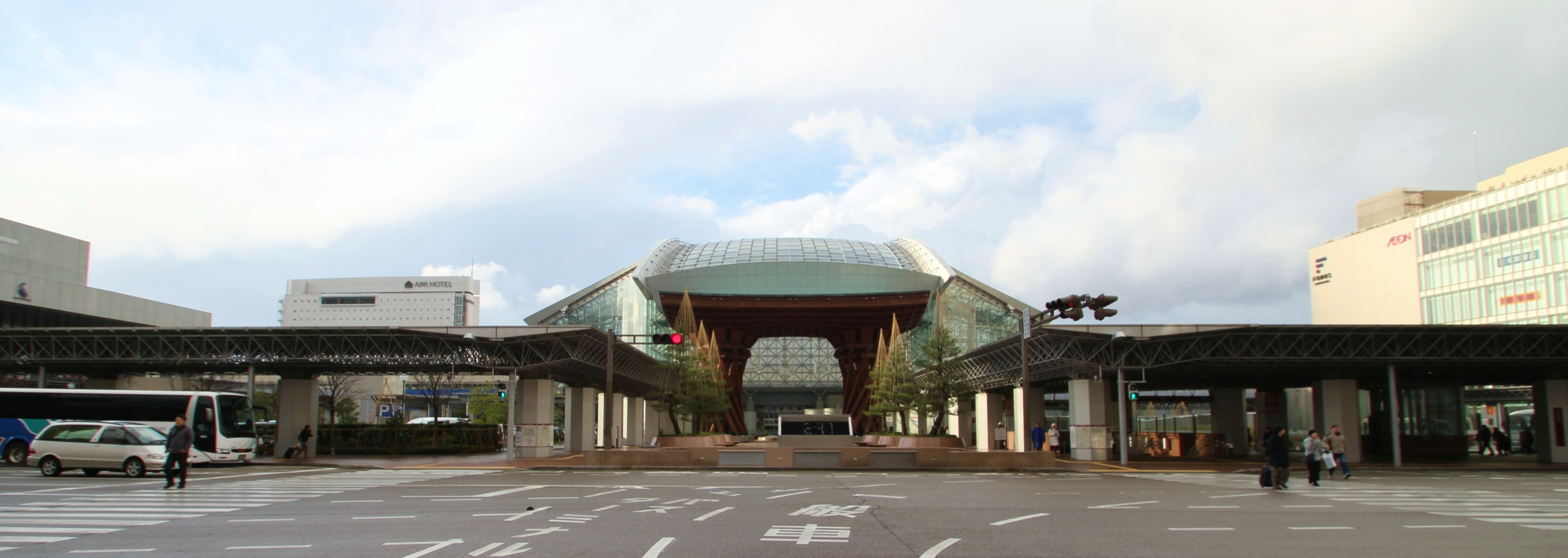
Kanazawa Station

- JR West
  - Hokuriku Shinkansen
  - Nanao Line
- Hokuriku Railway (Hokutetsu)
  - Asanokawa Line
  - Ishikawa Line
- Noto Railway Nanao Line
- IR Ishikawa Railway Line
- Ainokaze Toyama Railway Line
- Hapi-Line Fukui Line

=== Road ===
==== Expressways and toll roads ====
- Hakusan Super Forest Road
- Hokuriku Expressway
- Nōetsu Expressway
- Noto Toll Road

==== National highways ====
- National Route 8
- National Route 157 (Kanazawa – Hakusan – Katsuyama – Motosu – Gifu)
- National Route 159
- National Route 160
- National Route 249
- National Route 304
- National Route 305
- National Route 359
- National Route 360 (Toyama – Hida – Shirakawa – Komatsu)
- National Route 364
- National Route 365
- National Route 415
- National Route 416
- National Route 470 (Wajima – Himi – Takaoka – Oyabe – Tonami)
- National Route 471

=== Ports ===
- Kanazawa Port (International container hub port)
- Nanao Port

=== Airports ===
- Komatsu Airport
- Noto Airport

== Regional policies ==
- Premium Passport

== Politics ==
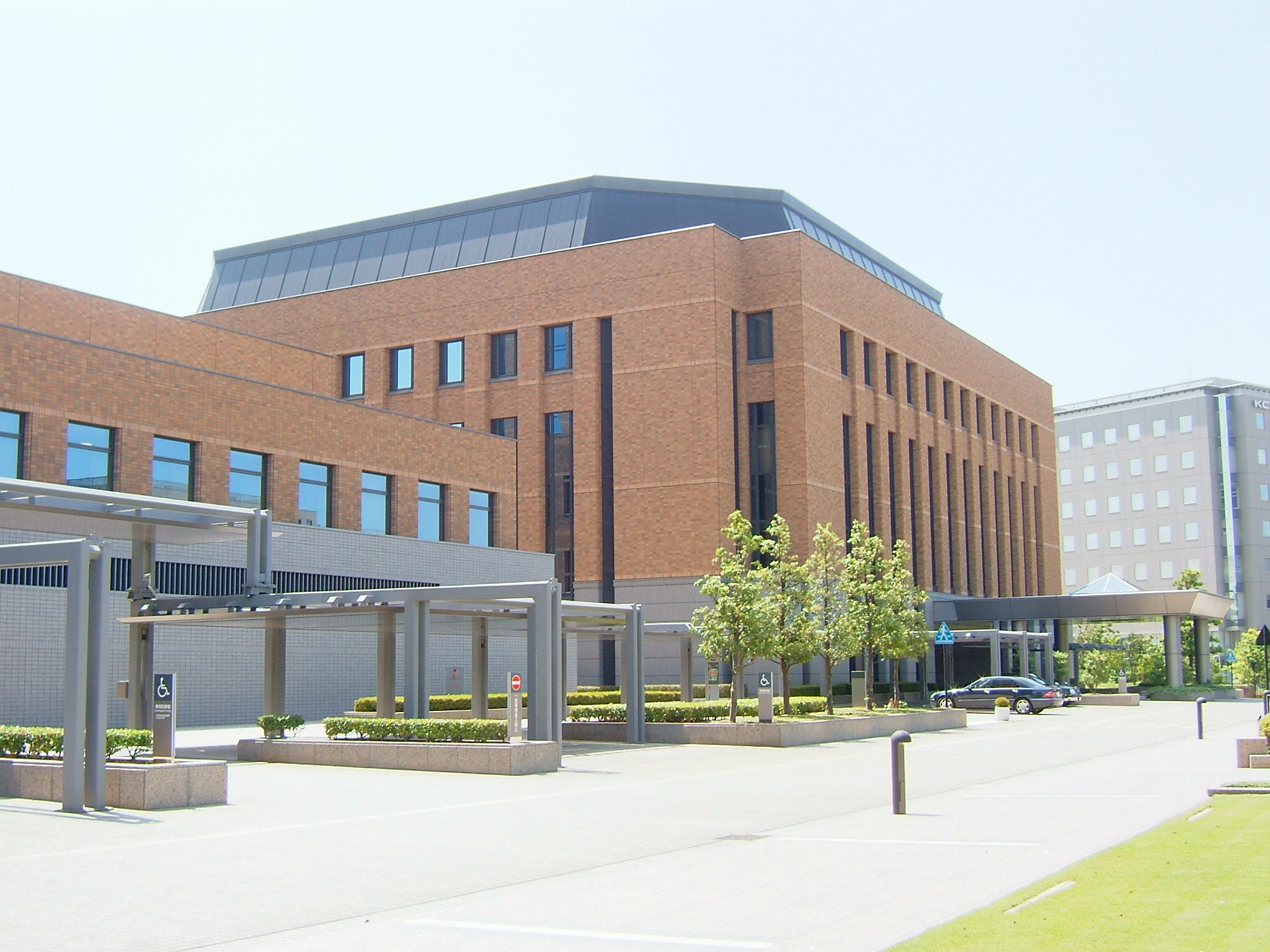
The prefectural assembly building in the prefectural government building complex in Kanazawa

The current governor of Ishikawa is Hiroshi Hase who was first elected in 2022. He defeated six time incumbent Masanori Tanimoto. Prior to his defeat, Tanimoto was one of two governors who were in their sixth term nationwide, the other being Masaru Hashimoto of Ibaraki. Hase is only the fifth governor of Ishikawa since 1947 when prefectural governors became elected offices, as Tanimoto had held the governorship for twenty eight years, first coming to office in 1994, succeeding Yōichi Nakanishi, who had served from 1963 until his death in 1994.

The Ishikawa Prefectural Assembly has 43 members and is elected in unified local elections (last round: 2011) in 15 SNTV electoral districts – six single-member, five two-member, one three-member, two four-member districts and the Kanazawa City district that elects 16 members. As of February 26, 2014, the LDP prefectural assembly caucus has 25 members and no other group has more than four members.

In the National Diet, Ishikawa is represented by three directly elected members of the House of Representatives and two (one per election) of the House of Councillors. Additional members from the prefecture may be elected in the proportional representation segments of both houses: the Hokuriku-Shin'etsu proportional representation block in the lower house, the proportional election to the upper house is nationwide. After the Diet elections of 2010, 2012 and 2013, the five directly elected members from Ishikawa districts are all Liberal Democrats, namely:

- in the House of Representatives
  - for the 1st district that covers Kanazawa City: Hiroshi Hase, LDP, 5th term,
  - for the 2nd district that consists of Southern parts of Ishikawa and had been the district of former LDP president Yoshirō Mori until 2012: Hajime Sasaki, LDP, 1st term,
  - for the 3rd district in the North: Shigeo Kitamura, LDP, 3rd term,
- in the House of Councillors
  - in the class of 2010 (term ends 2016): Naoki Okada, LDP, 2nd term, and
  - in the class of 2013 (term ends 2019): Shūji Yamada, LDP, 1st term who was able to defeat Democratic incumbent and former defense minister Yasuo Ichikawa by a huge margin in 2013.

== See also ==
- 2024 Noto earthquake
